= Podolsk =

Podolsk Подольск
- City
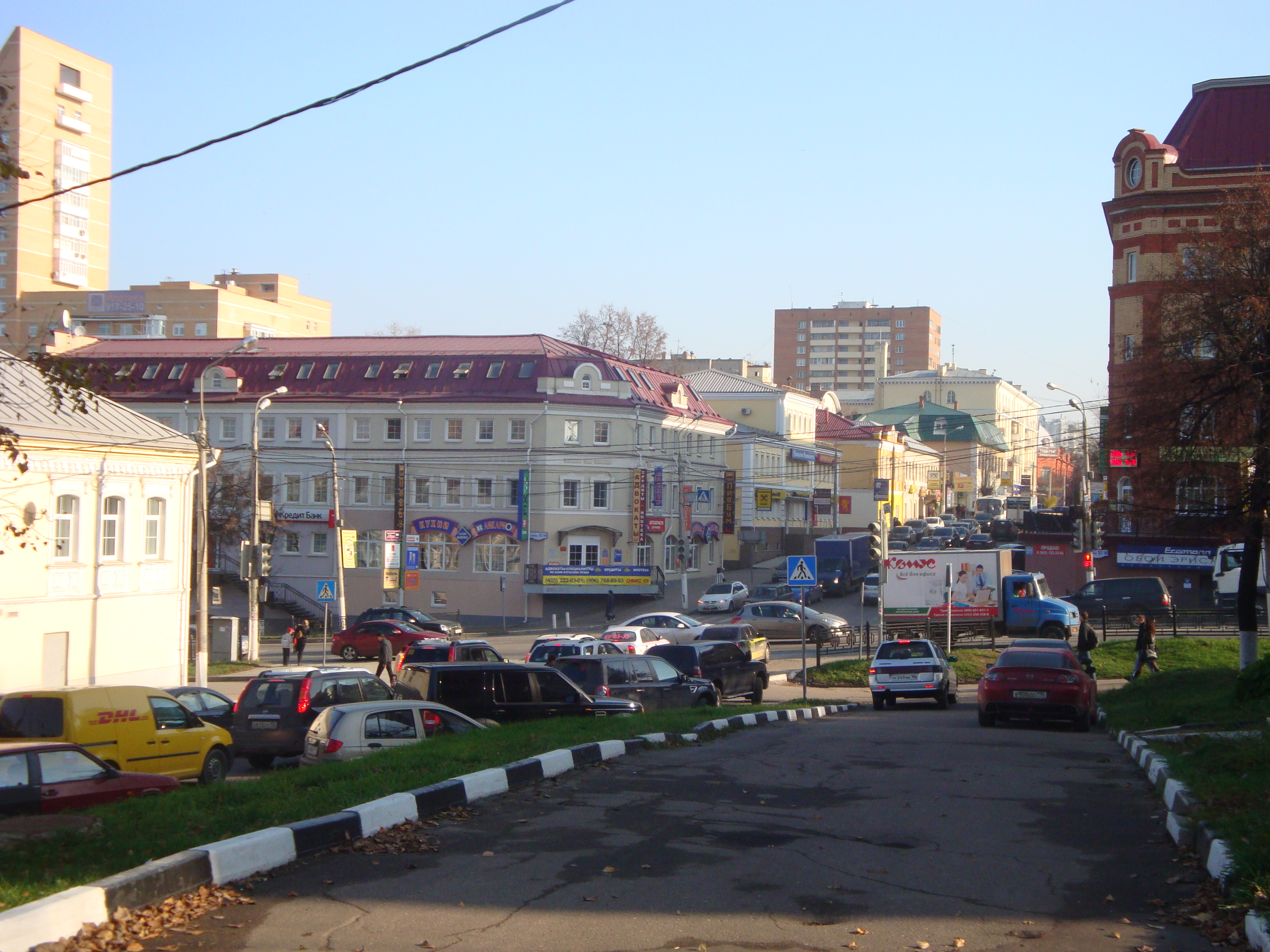
- Center of Podolsk

- Flag Coat of arms
- Interactive map of Podolsk
- Location of Podolsk Podolsk (Moscow Oblast)
- Coordinates: 55°25′52″N 37°32′44″E
- Country: Russia
- Federal subject: Moscow Oblast
- Founded: 1627
- City status since: 1781

Government
  - Head: Dmitry Zharikov

Area
  - Total: 40.39 km^{2} (15.59 sq mi)
- Elevation: 160 m (520 ft)

Population (2010 Census)
  - Total: 187,961
  - Estimate (2025): 313,414 (+66.7%)
  - Rank: 97th in 2010
  - Density: 4,654/km^{2} (12,050/sq mi)

Administrative status
  - Capital of: Podolsk City Under Oblast Jurisdiction

Municipal status
  - Urban okrug: Podolsk Urban Okrug
- Time zone: UTC+3 (MSK)
- Postal code: 142100—142134
- Dialing code: +7 4967
- OKTMO ID: 46760000001
- Website: подольск-администрация.рф

Podolsk (Russian: Подольск, IPA: [pɐˈdolʲsk]) is an industrial city, center of Podolsk Urban Okrug, Moscow Oblast, Russia, located on the Pakhra River (a tributary of the Moskva River). Its population is 314,934 (2021 census).

== Geography ==
Podolsk is located on the Moskvoretsko-Oka plain, in the center of the East European Plain, on the banks of the Pakhra River (a right tributary of the Moskva River). The city is located south of the capital, 36 km from its center and 15 km from the MKAD, on the highway and the Kursk direction of the Moscow Railway. It covers an area of 4,039 hectares. Most of Podolsk is located on the right bank of the Pakhra River and west of the railway line.

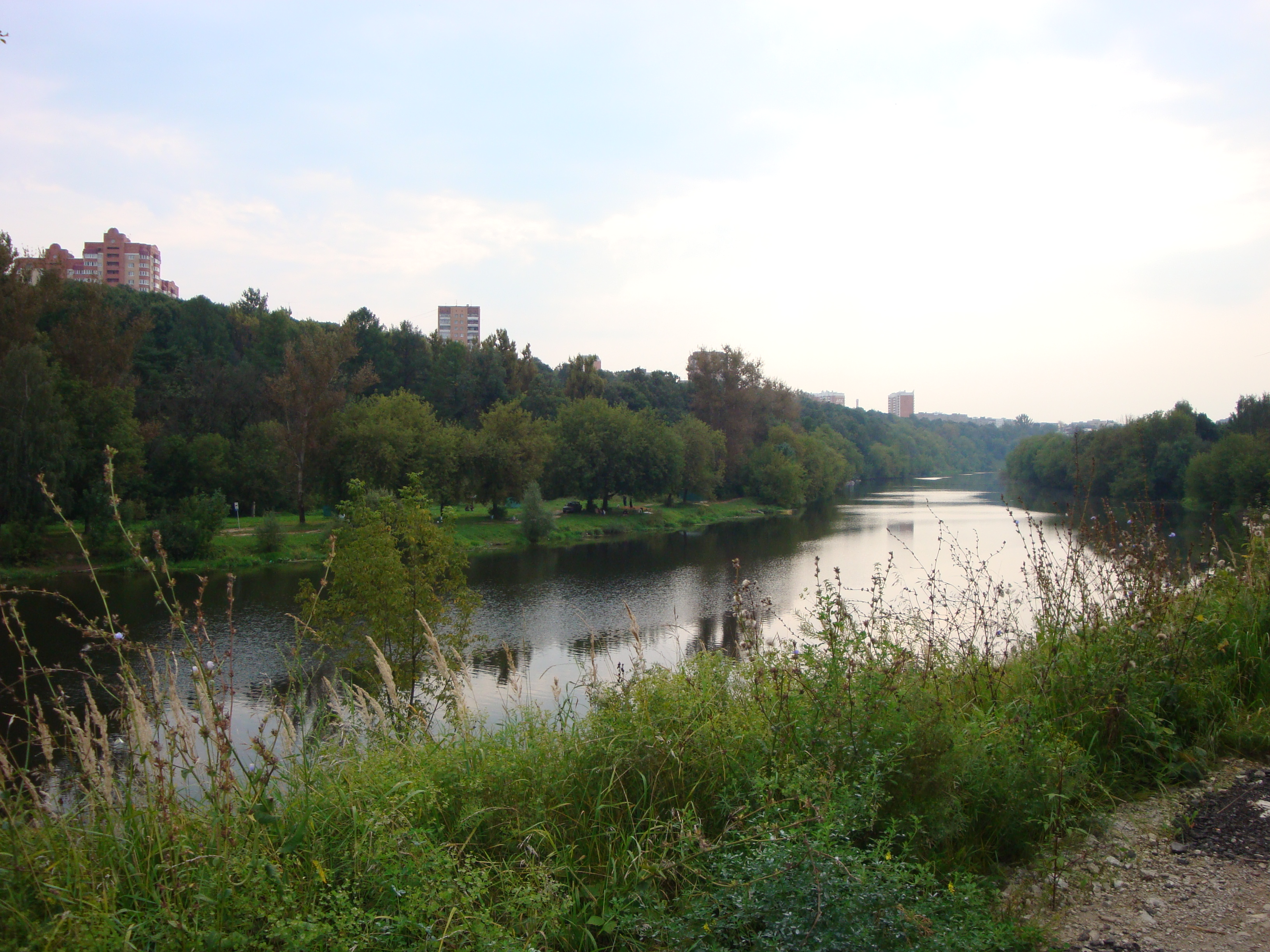
The Pakhra River in Podolsk

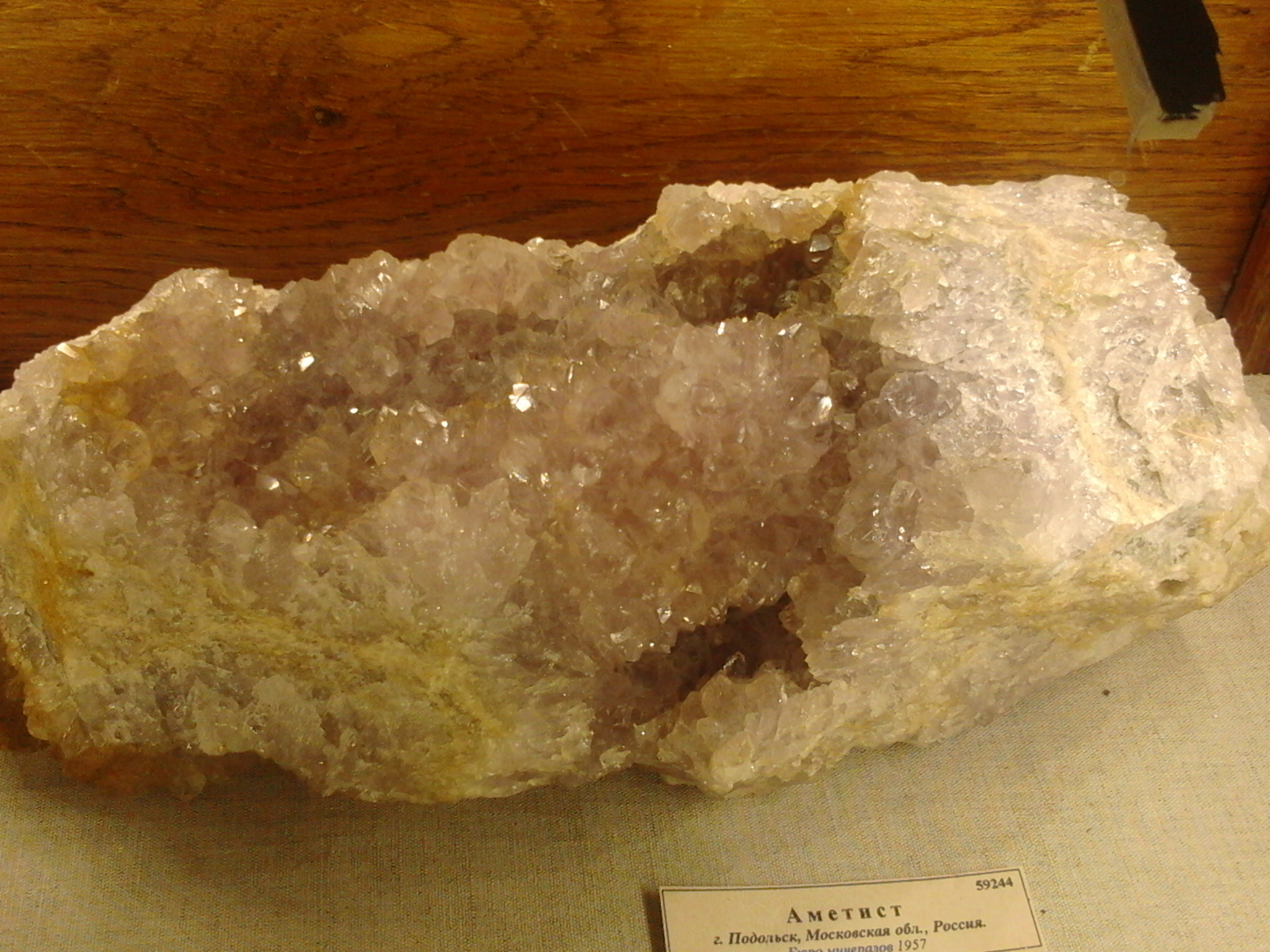
The mineral amethyst, discovered in the city of Podolsk in 1957

In the north it borders with the city of Moscow, namely with the settlements of Voskresenskoye and Ryazanovskoye of the Novomoskovsky administrative district.The geological structure of the territory on which Podolsk is located is similar to that of the East European Plain: it is flat, but at the same time not flat, with a height difference. The city is located on the territory of the Moskvoretsko-Oka physico-geographical province of the mixed forest subzone, with a predominance of landscapes of moraine and glacial plains. The soils are alluvial, grey and woody. On the territory of the city there are deposits of dolomitized limestone, which received the name "Podolsk marble" for its fine-grained texture and beautiful white color. However, its development is currently not underway.

=== Climate ===
Snow in Podolsk

The climate is temperate continental with relatively cold winters (early November — late March) and warm, humid summers (mid—May – early September). The frequent passage of cyclones from the Atlantic and sometimes from the Mediterranean causes an increase in clouds. The average temperatures are: January — about −9.4 °C, July — +18.4 °C. The average frost-free period is about 130 days. The average annual precipitation is 668 mm, with fluctuations in some years from 390 to 850 mm. Maximum precipitation (390 mm) falls in summer, minimum (160 mm) in winter.

The city of Podolsk, like the entire Moscow Region, is located in the time zone designated by the international standard as the Moscow Time Zone (MSK). The offset relative to UTC is +3:00. The meridian 37°30' EAST passes through the city, separating the 2nd and 3rd geographical time zones, therefore, in the west of the city, the applied time differs by one hour from the standard time. UTC+2, and in the east it coincides with the standard time. UTC+3

In general, Podolsk is characterized by a low level of atmospheric air pollution. According to the conducted analyses, the level of its pollution in the city, as a rule, ranges from high to low. At the same time, the indicators depend on the time of year and weather conditions. However, at the beginning of the 21st century, the situation is deteriorating: the main air pollutants are numerous industrial enterprises and road transport, the total number of which increases by 10–15 thousand cars annually. The maximum load on the air environment falls on the northeast and east of the city (that is, on the industrial zone), as well as on the Central District.

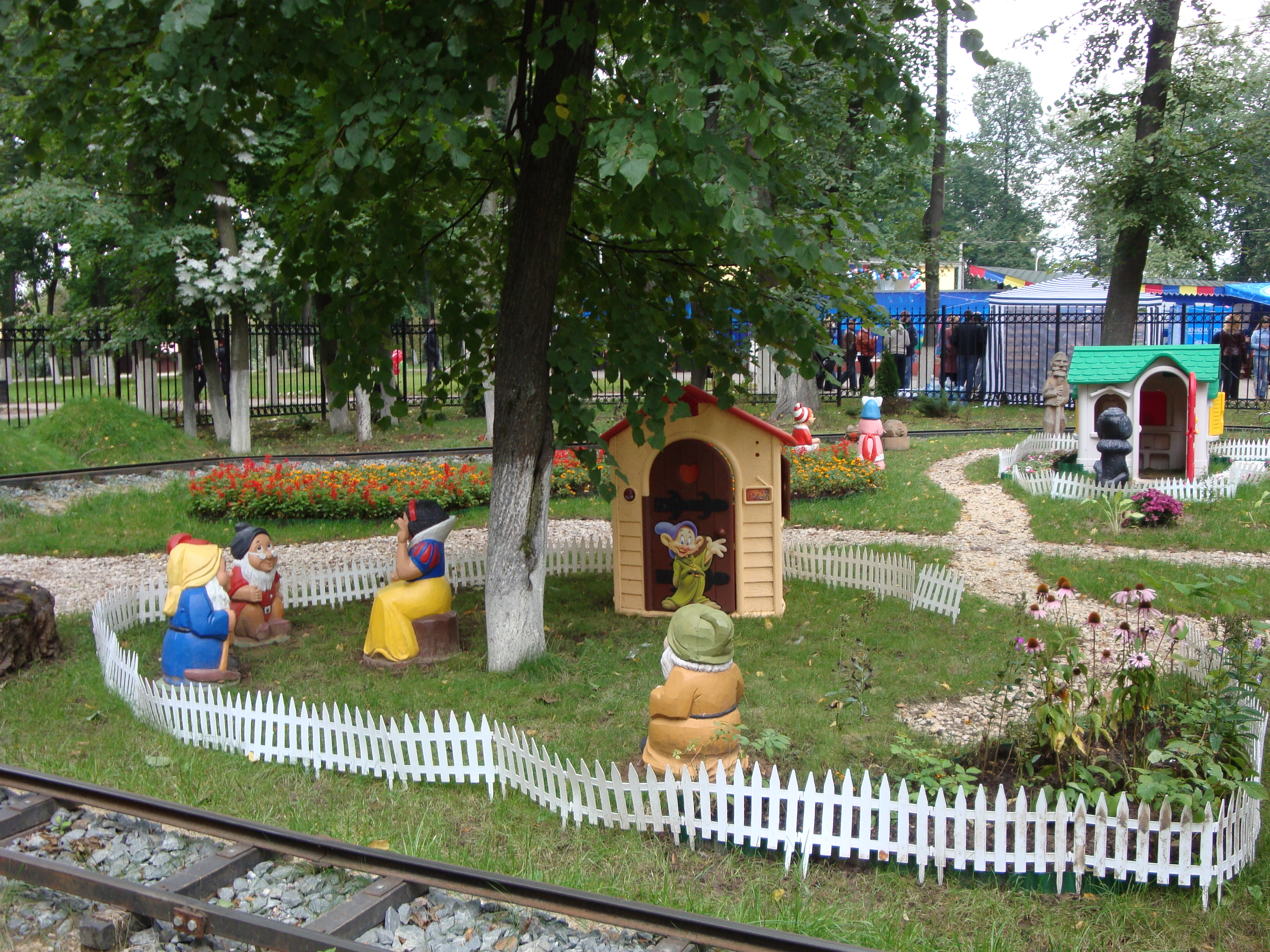
V. Talalikhin City Park of Culture and Recreation

Podolsk has a significant number of park areas. In the Park district of Podolsk there is the V. Talalikhin City Park of Culture and Recreation, on the territory of which there are attractions (including a Ferris wheel), playgrounds, cafes, a Green Bandstand (the first rock festival in the USSR was held there in September 1987). In recent years, it has been renovated with landscaping. In addition, there are numerous squares and forest parks in the city: Catherine Square near school No. 3, Victory Square, Podolsk Cadets Square, Pushkin Square, Generations Square in the city center, the square along Komsomolskaya and Bolshaya Zelenovskaya streets, Dubki, Yelochki, Berezki forest parks and others. The territory of Podolsk is bordered by extensive woodlands.

Historical population
Year	Pop.	±%
1897	3,800	—
1926	19,700	+418.4%
1939	72,409	+267.6%
1959	129,429	+78.7%
1970	168,706	+30.3%
1979	201,769	+19.6%
1989	209,178	+3.7%
2002	180,963	−13.5%
2010	187,961	+3.9%
2021	314,934	+67.6%
Source: Census data

== History ==
=== Early history ===
As a result of archaeological excavations on the territory of the city and the district conducted in 1994–1997, bone and silicon objects dating back to the 7th millennium BC, that is, to the Mesolithic era (VII—V millennia BC), were found. The first settlement, a site of primitive people, was found in Dubrovitsy, at the confluence of the Desna and Pakhra rivers. In turn, on the territory of the Podillya Museum-Reserve in the city there is the only multi-layered archaeological monument in the Moscow region with traces of human activity, starting from the Mesolithic era and including the Neolithic, Bronze Age, Early Iron Age, and Ancient Russian times.

In the Iron Age (VIII—V centuries BC), the territory of modern Podolsk was inhabited by representatives of the Finno-Ugric (including the Merya tribe) and Baltic tribes. During excavations on the left bank of the Pakhra, clay and the first iron products were found, which date back to this era. The discovered fragments of pottery were made at that time without the use of a potter's wheel and fired on a bonfire. Among the settlements of the Iron Age, the Finno-Ugric settlement of Grasshoppers stands out, which occupied a promontory flowing into Petritsa, a tributary of Urine. The remains of a house, hearths, ceramic products, Dyakov-type weights were found here. The Finno-Ugric influence was reflected, among other things, in the local toponymy: it was the Finno-Ugric Peoples who gave the name to the Pakhra River.

In the 9th—10th centuries, Slavic tribes settled on the territory of the Podolsk region, which began to coexist with local Finno-Ugrians. The findings of archaeological research on the territory of the city (rings, pendants, ceramic products made of gray and white clay, made on a potter's wheel) prove that in the X—XIV centuries the Slavic tribes of Vyatichi lived in this area. As in the case of the Finno-Ugrians, the Slavic presence was reflected in the names of local geographical objects: the Slavs named the rivers Desna (translated from other-Rus. — "right", which indicates the movement of the Slavs from the mouth of the Pakhra to its sources) and Mocha.

The question of the political affiliation of the territory of modern Podolsk in the XI—XII centuries remains controversial. According to the conclusions of the 19th-century Russian historian P. V. Golubovsky, based on a study of the charters and charters of Prince Rostislav Mstislavich of Smolensk, the territory in the basin of the Pakhra River belonged to the Principality of Smolensk in the 12th century. However, this conclusion, drawn on the basis of the identification of the churchyard of Dobryatin in the charter and the village of Dobratina on the outskirts of Podolsk, is not shared by all historians. The main counterargument is the fact that the village (the center of the princely patrimony) Dobratino arose only in the second half of the 14th century and owes its name to the Dobratinskaya borti, on the territory of which it originated (at that time, on the territory of the modern V. Talalikhin PKiO, the surroundings of Rabochaya Street, the Zalineiny Industrial district and its environs, there were onboard princely forests, and onboard beekeeping was the most important trade of local residents).

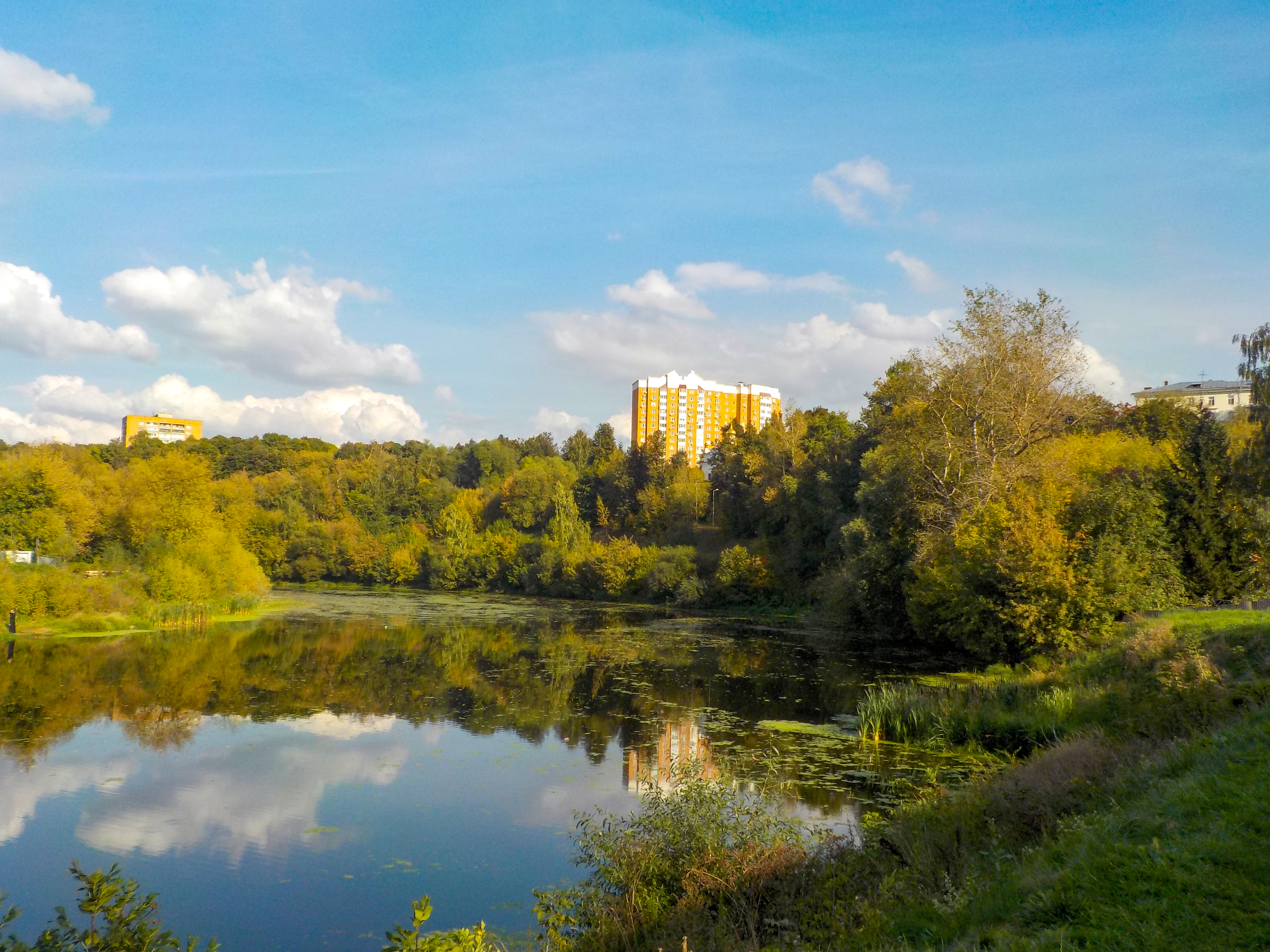
The bend of the Pakhra, where the village of Podol and the churchyard were located

In the 12th century, information about Vyatka cities also appeared in Russian chronicles, primarily Moscow's Peremyshl, located on the Moche River (founded by Yuri Dolgoruky in 1152) near modern Podolsk. By the 17th century, the role of Przemysl had declined, and at that time it was no longer called a city in the scribal books, but a settlement. By the 70s of the 14th century, the eastern part of the Smolensk Principality, along with the territory of modern Podolsk, was ceded to the Moscow Principality, and in 1559 the village of Dobratino with villages and churchyards (80 villages, 2 churchyards and 24 wastelands) was granted to the Danilov Monastery. The Charter of 1559 issued by Tsar Ivan the Terrible is the first historical document that contains information about settlements that existed at that time on the territory of modern Podolsk. Among them, the historical predecessor of the city of Podolsk, the village of Podol, was mentioned.

The exact time of the origin of this village is unknown due to the fact that no archaeological excavations have yet been carried out at the sites of the deposition of the most ancient cultural layers associated with the Hem. However, it can be assumed that this happened at the turn of the XV—XVI centuries or even earlier. It is only known that until the end of the 18th century, the village was located 50–80 m upstream of the Pakhra River from the modern automobile bridge in the center of Podolsk and, according to a Charter of 1559, courtyards from the village called "other Strelnikovo" were "demolished" into it. In addition, from this document it can be concluded that three elements have become an integral part of the future village of Podol: the village of Podol, the churchyard "on the river on the Pakhra, and in it the Church of the Resurrection of Christ," as well as the Yamskoy camp.

In general, the emergence and further development of the Hemline was a reflection of the trend in the formation of a radial settlement structure along the tracts.: Podol was formed on a steep bend of the Pakhra River, which was used as a waterway, and a highway passed through the settlement that connected Moscow with the western and southern principalities of Russia. At the same time, the construction of the low left bank of the Pakhra was initially carried out, and only then — the right bank.

=== The village of Podol ===
During the Time of Troubles, the village of Podol became the scene of active hostilities. Although documentary evidence about this period remains scarce, one of the documents-reports of 1606 speaks about the battle on the Pakhra of government troops with the rebel army of Ivan Bolotnikov: "there was a battle with thieves on the Pakhra ... and thieves were beaten." According to the surviving information, a month after the battle, in November 1606, the priest of the village of Podol, Elisey, and the peasant of the Danilov monastery's patrimony, Danil Mitrofanov, were among the prisoners in the Discharge Order. The first written mention of the village of Podol dates back to 1606.

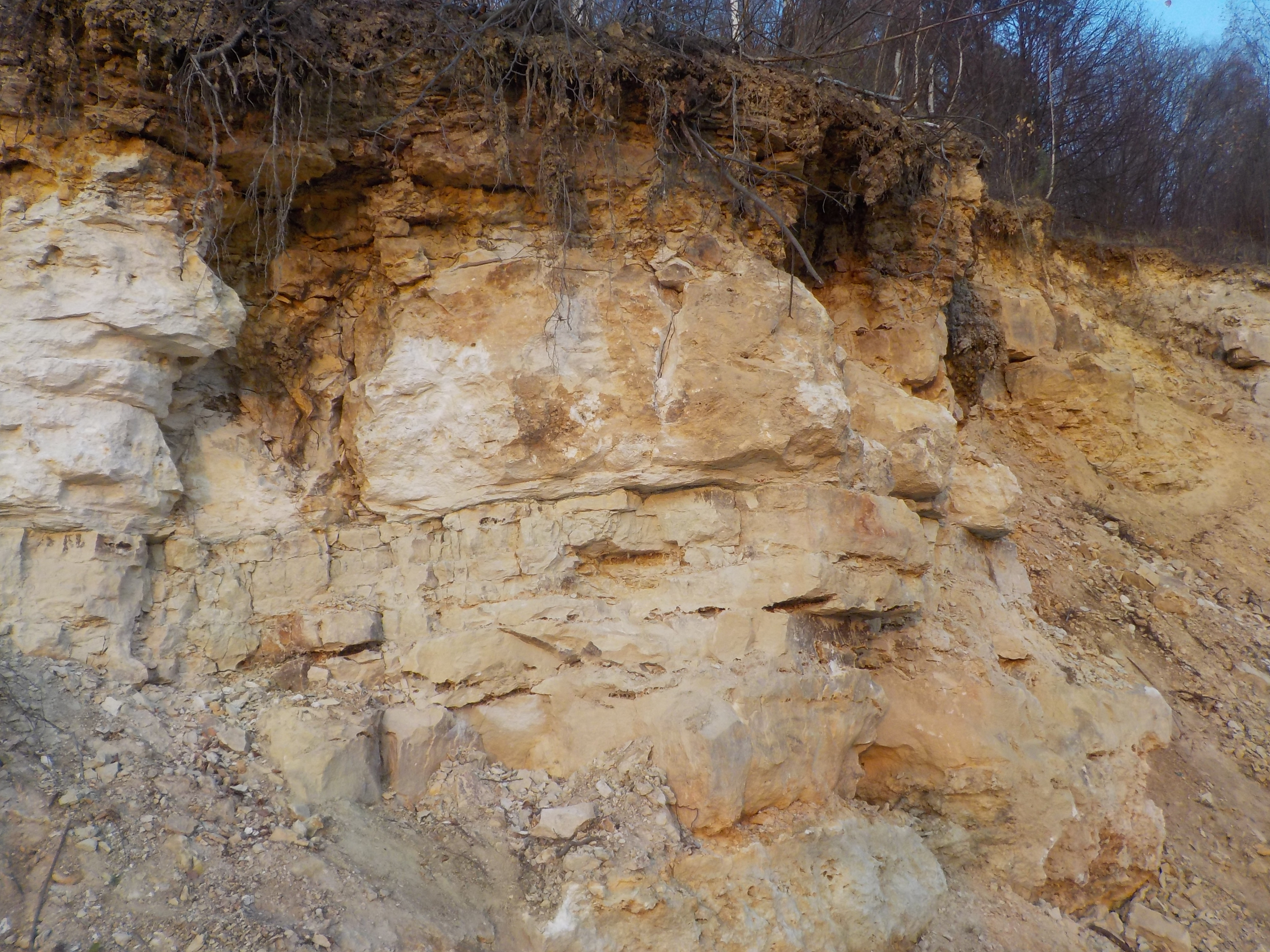
Podolsk limestone

According to the scribal books of 1626–1628, the village of Podol was already the largest settlement of the Danilov monastery patrimony on the Pakhra, surpassing the village of Dobratino, which was the center of the monastery patrimony, by more than twice the size of the arable land. Due to the fact that the size of the arable land of the village of Podol was ten times larger than the size of the arable land of an ordinary village, there is reason to assume that the main land complex of Podol was formed before the 50s of the XVI century and was characterized by exceptional stability of the planning structure. In the middle of the 16th century, the village of Podol consisted of a single street (Bolshaya Serpukhovskaya Road), built up on both sides with peasant yards, which was crossed by the Pakhra River approximately in the middle. In turn, the church and the churchyard occupied a position outside the village structure and were located on a high bank east of Podol (in addition to the church, up to three Popovsky and Bobylsky courtyards were also located here). As the village of Podol grew, its administrative merger with the pogost took place, and thus the village was formed. Further growth and development of Podol, which was part of the Molotsk camp of the Moscow district, They were directly connected to the Serpukhovskaya road that passed through the settlement. Thus, Podol was originally formed as a village by the road. In addition to grain farming and gardening, the inhabitants were engaged in the cart industry (they transported carts, sleds, carriages through the Pakhra), had inns with taverns, mined butte, white stone and "Podolsk marble". Food was mainly exported to Moscow, and manufactured goods were exported from Moscow.

In subsequent years, the road to Serpukhov, in connection with the confrontation with the Crimean Khanate, acquired even greater military and strategic importance for Russia and became an "embassy". At the same time, the role of the village of Podol as a transit point and an inn increased. On March 30, 1687, at the height of the Crimean campaigns, it was ordered to "establish mail from Moscow to Akhtyrsk and to Kolomak in 17 places. And put a horse guard and four archers on the walls of the stable, and give them two horses for each person to race..." The first postal camp was established in Moscow at the Zhitny Dvor, the second — on the Pakhra, in the village of Podol (the camp was called "Pakhra Tulskaya"). In 1696, after the start of the construction of the Russian fleet at the Voronezh shipyards, a postal line was once again organized between Moscow and Voronezh, and the camp was again organized in the village of Podol. The village retained the role of a transshipment point in the middle of the XVIII century. So, in 1743–1744, in connection with the journey of Empress Elizabeth Petrovna to Kiev, it was planned to build a travel palace in Podil. However, it was later decided to limit the construction of a glacier and a mossy barn in the village.

The advantageous position of the village contributed to the active growth of Podol: from 1678 to 1704, the number of peasant and Bobyl households increased 1.8 times (from 43 to 78), and from 1626–1628 to 1766, the size of the village increased 4 times. At the same time, the population of Podol was exceptionally stable, and the population grew mainly due to natural growth rather than migration.

In 1764, the ferry across the Pakhra was replaced by a floating bridge. In the same year, the monastery lands were secularized: the village became an economic one, that is, it came under the control of the State College of Economy (1764–1781). As a result, the villagers were classified as economic peasants, which made their lives much easier compared to serfs (the taxes they paid to the state were lower).

In the 18th century, the first stone structures appeared in Podil, primarily the church. As you know, the Church of the Resurrection of the XVI—XVII centuries was a wooden structure and belonged to the simplest type of temple, which was based on a log house with a gable roof. In 1722, a fire broke out in it, so in 1728, Abbot Gerasim and his brethren, the rector of the monastery of St. Daniel of Moscow, appealed to the Synodal Government Order with a request to allow the construction of a white stone church on the old site of the church. Nevertheless, its construction was delayed for more than 40 years. By the 1780s, there was only one other stone building in the village, a malt house on the left bank of the Pakhra River near the bridge.

=== The development of the city before the beginning of the 20th century ===
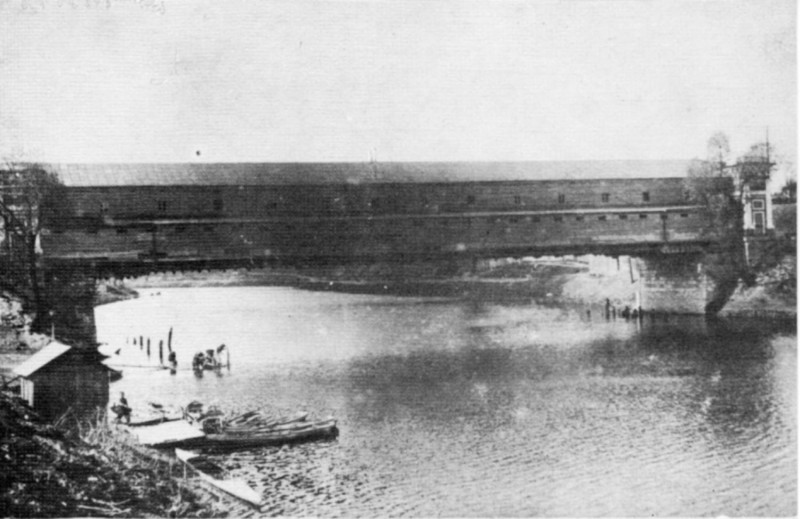
Wooden bridge over the Pakhra River. The beginning of the XX century

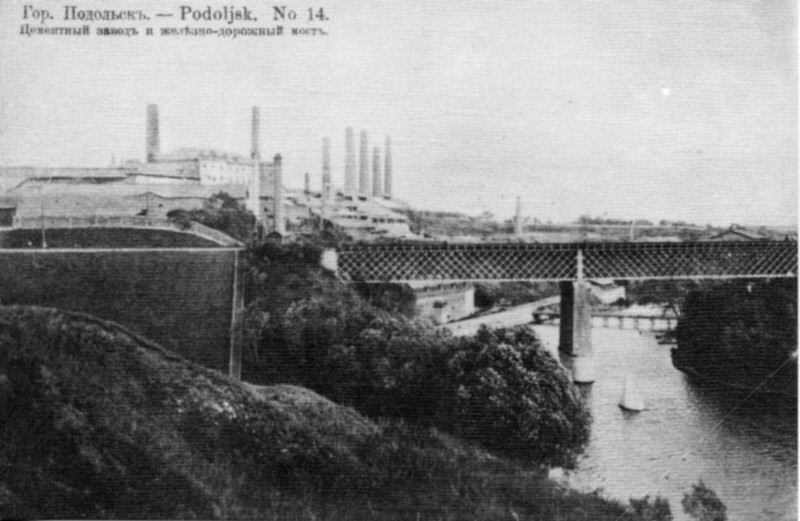
Podolsk, the Tsemzavod (1875) and the railway bridge. The beginning of the XX century

By decree of Empress Catherine II, on October 5 (October 16), 1781, the village of Podol was transformed into a city (already under the name Podol-Pekhra), which became the center of the Podolsk district of the Moscow province. The local peasants were enrolled in the merchant class and philistinism. By that time, there were 108 households and 856 townspeople in the city. The main occupation of the inhabitants was the extraction of rubble and white stone, from which, for example, the famous Church of the Sign of the Blessed Virgin Mary in Dubrovitsy was built. On December 20 (December 31), 1781, the city was awarded a coat of arms: "Two golden tools used by stonemasons in a blue field; as a sign that the inhabitants are enriched by this trade." On October 7, 1782, the Podolsk nobles elected Chamberlain A. S. Vasilchikov as chairman of the nobility (later they were Prince P. M. Volkonsky and chamber junker A.M. Katkov)

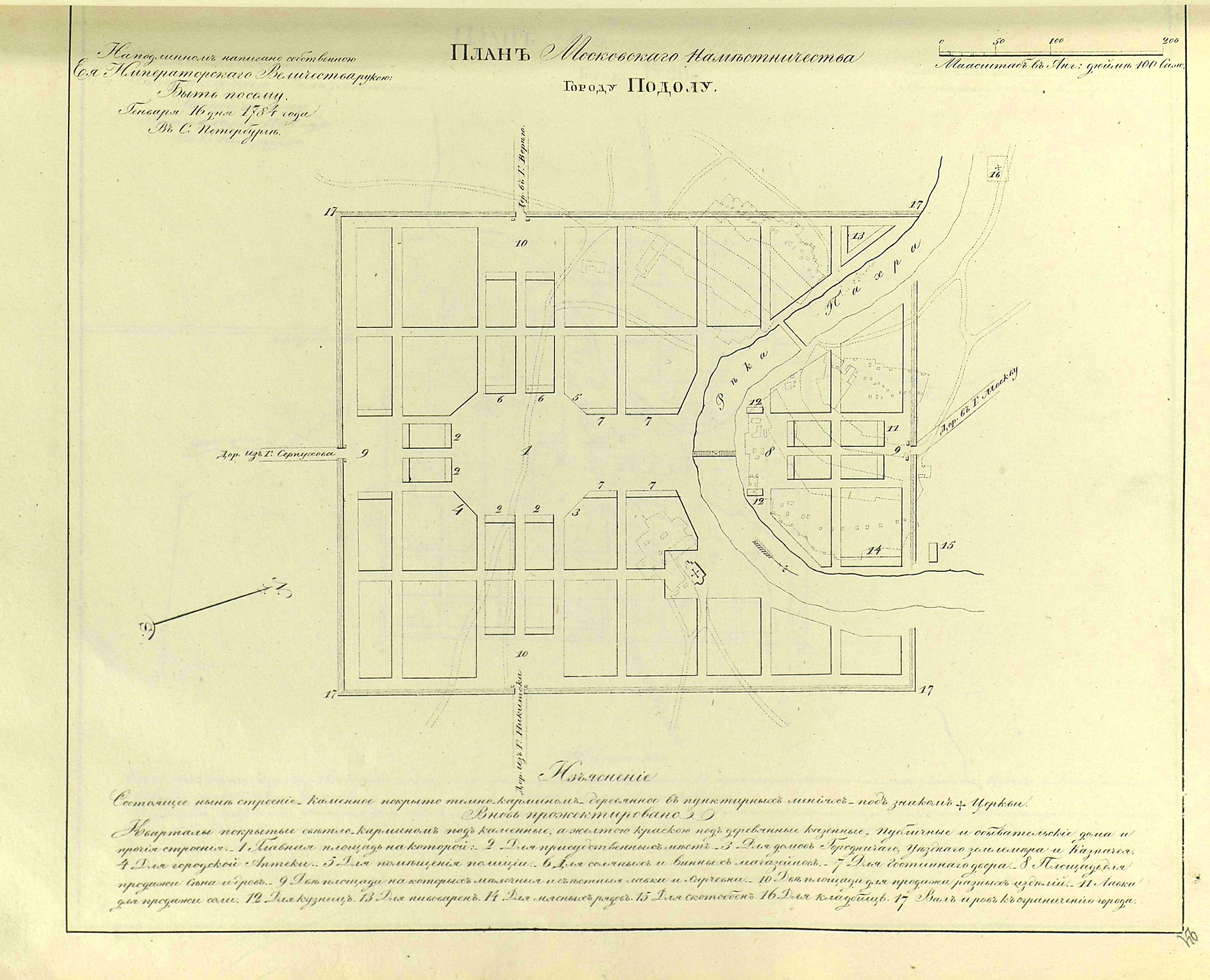
The "projected" plan of the city of Podolsk in 1784 from the "Complete Collection of Laws of the Russian Empire. A book of drawings and drawings. City plans"

On January 16, 1784, Catherine II approved a "projected" regular rectangular building plan for the city with a longitudinal and transverse grid of streets, developed in St. Petersburg by the "commission of buildings" (the plan was signed by architect Ivan Lem). The city was divided into 20 blocks. The nineteenth was called "petty—bourgeois," the seventeenth was called "noble," and the eighteenth was called "merchant." Nevertheless, despite the fact that the initial master plan was a professional work, the architect was not familiar with the terrain in the vicinity of Podil, which was characterized by a large number of ravines and slopes. Therefore, at the initiative of Moscow Governor Lopukhin, adjustments were made to it: "the structure should be moved to the left by 150 fathoms, where the city is more level." The implementation of the master plan fixed a peculiar situation in the city, when the buildings of the former village of Podol remained unchanged, and new structures (primarily government buildings) were built behind the village (in fact, in the field), including offices, the Traveling Palace of Catherine II, and the national school. In modern Podolsk, traces of the old layout have been preserved on the right bank of the Pakhra River, along the central planning axis of the Moscow road.

In general, despite the rise in status, Podol-Pekhra retained the character of a roadside village, rather than a city of merchants and industrial capital, until the second half of the 19th century. However, the new status led to the formation of administrative authorities and a new, more educated class. The spread of education was facilitated by the construction of the national school, one of the first government buildings in the city, built after the decree of Catherine II.

In 1796, by decree of Emperor Paul I, Podolsk became a minor city, and the postal camp was transferred to the village of Molodi. The post office was opened only in 1801, and in 1802, by decree of Alexander I, Podolsk again became the center of the county.

On September 6–7, 1812, during the Patriotic War, the Russian army of Field Marshal Kutuzov was in Podolsk, on the territory of the modern Kutuzovo microdistrict, and after a while the city was occupied for a short time by French troops, who inflicted significant damage on it. In memory of the victory in the Patriotic War of 1812, in the period from 1819 to 1832, the Trinity Cathedral was erected in Podolsk (now located in the city center, opposite the Recreation Center. By Karl Marx).

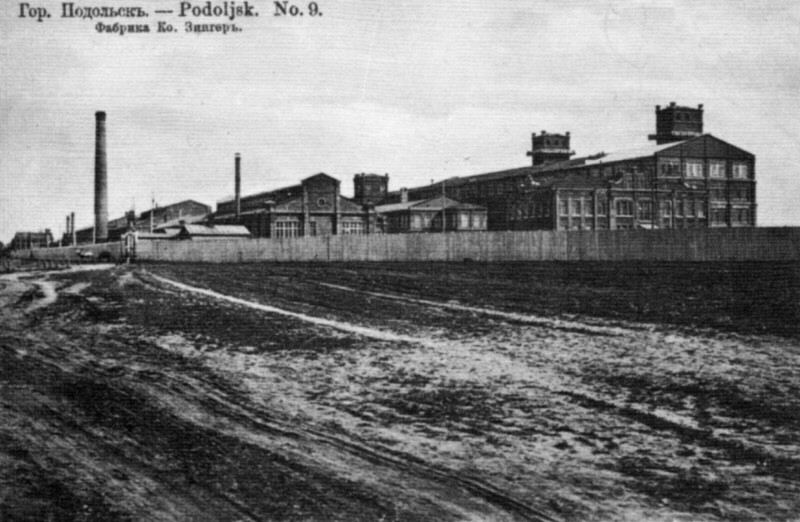
The Singer factory at the beginning of the 20th century

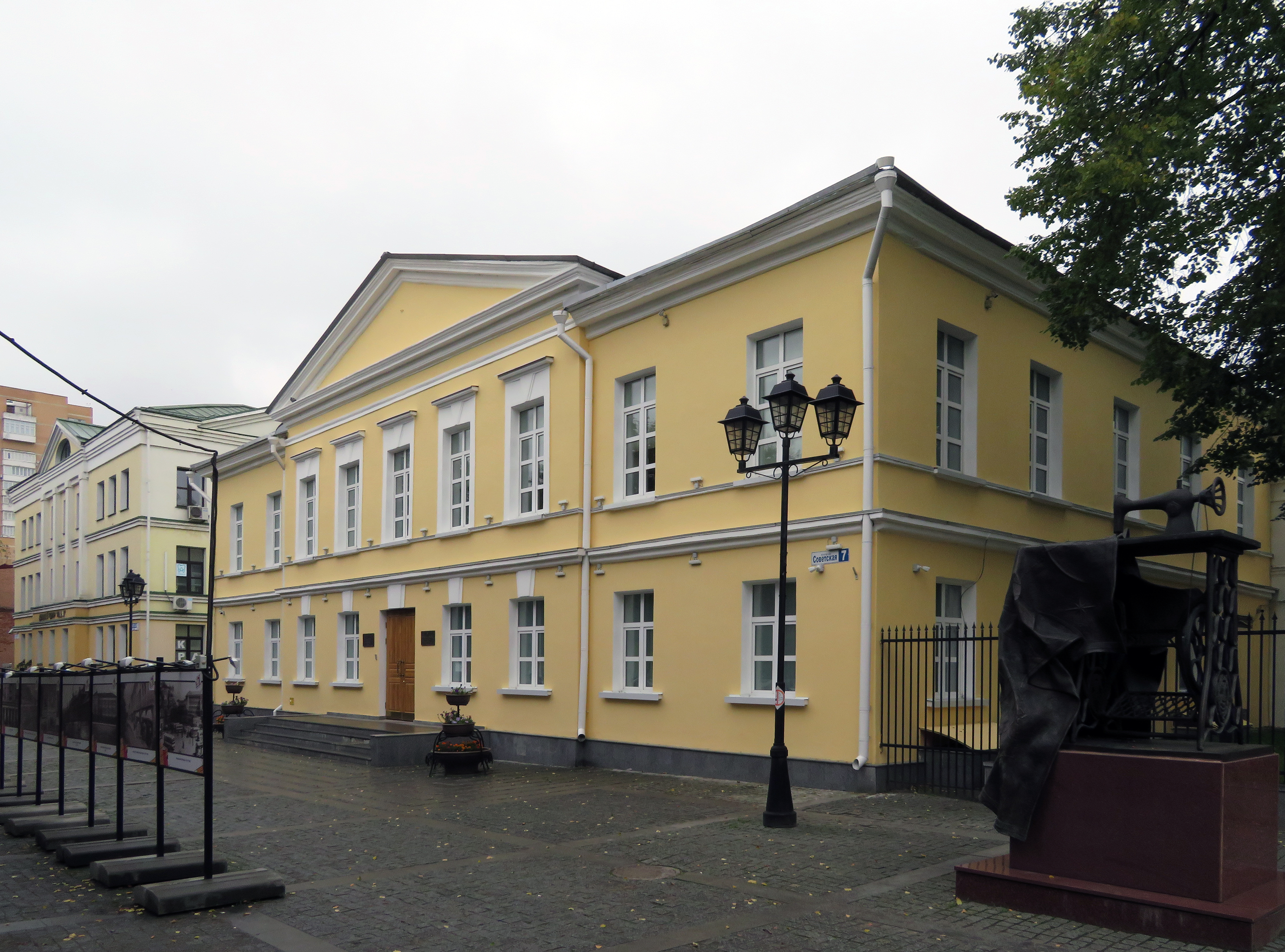
The Museum of Local Lore (in the building of the former Offices) and the monument to the Singer sewing machine)

It was after the Napoleonic invasion that the spatial structure of the historical city center finally took shape in Podolsk. For example, shopping malls were built on the territory adjacent to the cathedral. The heyday of stone architecture, as well as public life, dates back to the time of the governor-General in Moscow, Count A. A. Zakrevsky, who had an estate near Podolsk — the village of Ivanovskoye (currently located within the city). In 1894–1896, the municipal garden (the modern V. Talalikhin Garden Park) became publicly accessible. The first artificial plantings began to appear here in the middle of the 19th century: in 1849, by order of A. A. Zakrevsky, the first tree, a silver poplar, was planted in the garden.

The development of the city was facilitated by the Warsaw (Brest-Litovsk) highway, which was built in 1844–1847. An important event was the construction of a bridge over the Pakhra River. Initially, the bridge was floating. In winter, it was disassembled (loads were moved on ice), and during high water, a ferry was used. In 1844–1845, the development of a single-span bridge began, and in 1862, the Russian Minister of War, D. A. Milyutin, spoke about the need to build a permanent bridge. In 1864, a wooden bridge was built across the Pakhra, but it stood for about a year, after which it collapsed. The new bridge was rebuilt by military engineers using the system of the American engineer Gau, thanks to which it stood for 60 years. By the middle of the 19th century, the area of the city was already 106 hectares. In 1866, the Moscow-Kursk Railway came to Podolsk, which gave an impetus to the development of local industry.

The trading capital acquired in the inns led to the appearance of private factories in the city. The most famous of them in the first half of the 19th century were the Wax and Tannery (originated in 1843), the Brewery and Malt Factories (originated in 1849). In the first half of the century Podolsk remained, for the most part, a city of merchants and burghers, therefore trade continued to play a key role. But in the second half of the 19th century Podolsk became a city of industrial capital, and the rapid development of industry began.

In 1871, in order to build a cement factory and a brick factory near Podolsk, the Gubonin, Porokhovshchikov & Co. company was established, founded by two Moscow entrepreneurs and philanthropists: P. I. Gubonin, the owner of quarries on the right bank of the Pakhra River in the Dobryatinsky parish of the Podolsk District, and A. A. Porokhovshchikov, an architect and builder. In 1875, after the completion of the construction of factories on the purchased AA. Based on a 36-hectare plot of land in the village of Vypolzovo (modern Vypolzovo district), the company was transformed into the Moscow Joint-Stock Company for the Production of Cement and Other Building Materials and Trade in Them (by this time P. I. Gubonin had retired from the company) In the same year, the first products of JSC were received: Portland cement, Romanesque cement, lime, baked brick. Despite the loss-making nature of the plants in the early years of their existence, by the end of the 19th century, the state of affairs in the Joint-Stock Company had improved significantly, and the production of building materials at the plants had increased 17-fold. By the same time, cement had become the main product of the plants: by 1913, 95% of all cargo shipped from Podolsk was this building material. At one time, Podolsk cement was used in the construction of the stands on Moscow's Red Square, the building of the Historical Museum and the Moscow City Duma.

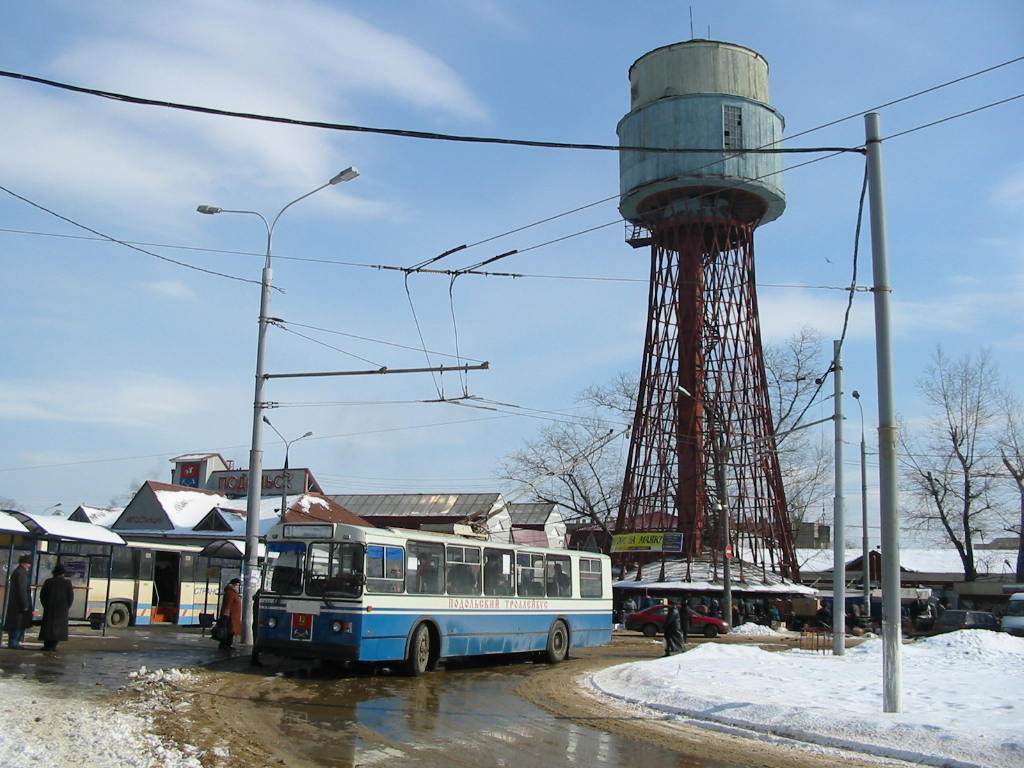
Vladimir Shukhov Water Tower (demolished in 2003)

In 1900, the American company Singer, which was engaged in the assembly of sewing machines, also acquired a plot of land in Podolsk, starting construction of its first factory in Russia. The Singer company itself appeared on the Russian market back in the 1860s. However, before the construction of the Podolsk plant, all products were imported from abroad, which significantly increased the cost of sewing machines. It was the desire to avoid product price increases that largely pushed Singer to build its plant in Russia. Production of the first products (household sewing machines) it was established in Podolsk already in 1902. The factory's production growth continued until the 1917 revolution. By 1917, there were 37 production buildings on its territory and over 5,000 people worked. In 1915, one of the Singer's buildings was leased to the Zemgor military plant, which was evacuated from the Baltic States and produced military shells. In the same year, the construction of a cable factory by the Moscow Association of Copper Rolling and Cable Factories began, but it was not completed due to the revolution.

Along with the growth of industrial production in the city, demographic growth was also noted, while Podolsk experienced the highest levels of population growth among the cities of the Moscow province. The increase in the city's population and its density, in turn, contributed to the development of the social sphere (healthcare and education). The first official information about the organization of the Podolsk county hospital (since 1868 — the Zemstvo hospital) dates back to 1866. However, its small capacity (it was located in a small two-story brick building on Moskovskaya Street and had only 42 beds), as well as the cholera epidemic in Podolsk in 1871, prompted the Zemstvo Government to actively build hospitals in the city. In 1880, five years after the foundation stone was laid, the building of the new Zemstvo hospital was opened, and in 1882, a new hospital with five independent departments, including obstetric beds. In 1887, the first women's gymnasium appeared in the city, and in 1895, the Kozlov Vocational School. With the construction of the Singer plant and the further development of industrial production in Podolsk, a number of important facilities (mainly stone objects) were built: the building of the City Duma and the bank (1901), the women's gymnasium (1903), the building of the Red Rows (1910), the Society of Consumers of the Singer plant (1911merchant Tolkushev opened the Khudozhestvenny cinema, built the first electric station (1914), put into operation a water supply system and built a water tower system by engineer and architect V. G. Shukhov (1917).

In 1900, the Construction Department of the Moscow Provincial Government developed and approved the "Plan of Podolsk with the pasture lands belonging to it...", which increased the area of the city by about 3 times due to the expansion of the city limits in the southern, south-eastern and south-western directions.

=== The years of revolution and the establishment of Soviet power ===
Despite significant successes in economic life, the situation in the socio-political sphere of city life in the late 1910s was difficult, as it was everywhere in the country. The reorientation of the economy towards the production of military products, increased working hours, food supply disruptions and other factors led to increased workers' discontent. Bolshevik propaganda began in the city through health insurance funds, drama clubs, and cooperatives. On the night of February 28, 1917, the first news of the overthrow of the monarchy appeared in Podolsk, and the next day rallies were held (about 7 thousand people) in support of the workers of Petrograd and Moscow.

At the same time, the Podolsk Council of Workers' Deputies was formed in the city, consisting of 150 people. The Bolshevik N. G. Chizhov was elected Chairman of the Executive Committee of the Council. Mensheviks, Socialist Revolutionaries, and anarchists were also elected to the Council. On March 1, with the support of soldiers, the police was disbanded and the people's militia was created, and control over the telegraph was established. On the same day, the Council was renamed the Podolsk Council of Workers' and Soldiers' Deputies. On March 22, an 8-hour working day was introduced at the city's enterprises, and factory committees were formed. Due to the fact that the Provisional Government refused to finance the activities of the Soviets, self-taxation was introduced: Podolsk workers contributed from 0.5 to 2% to the Council fund.

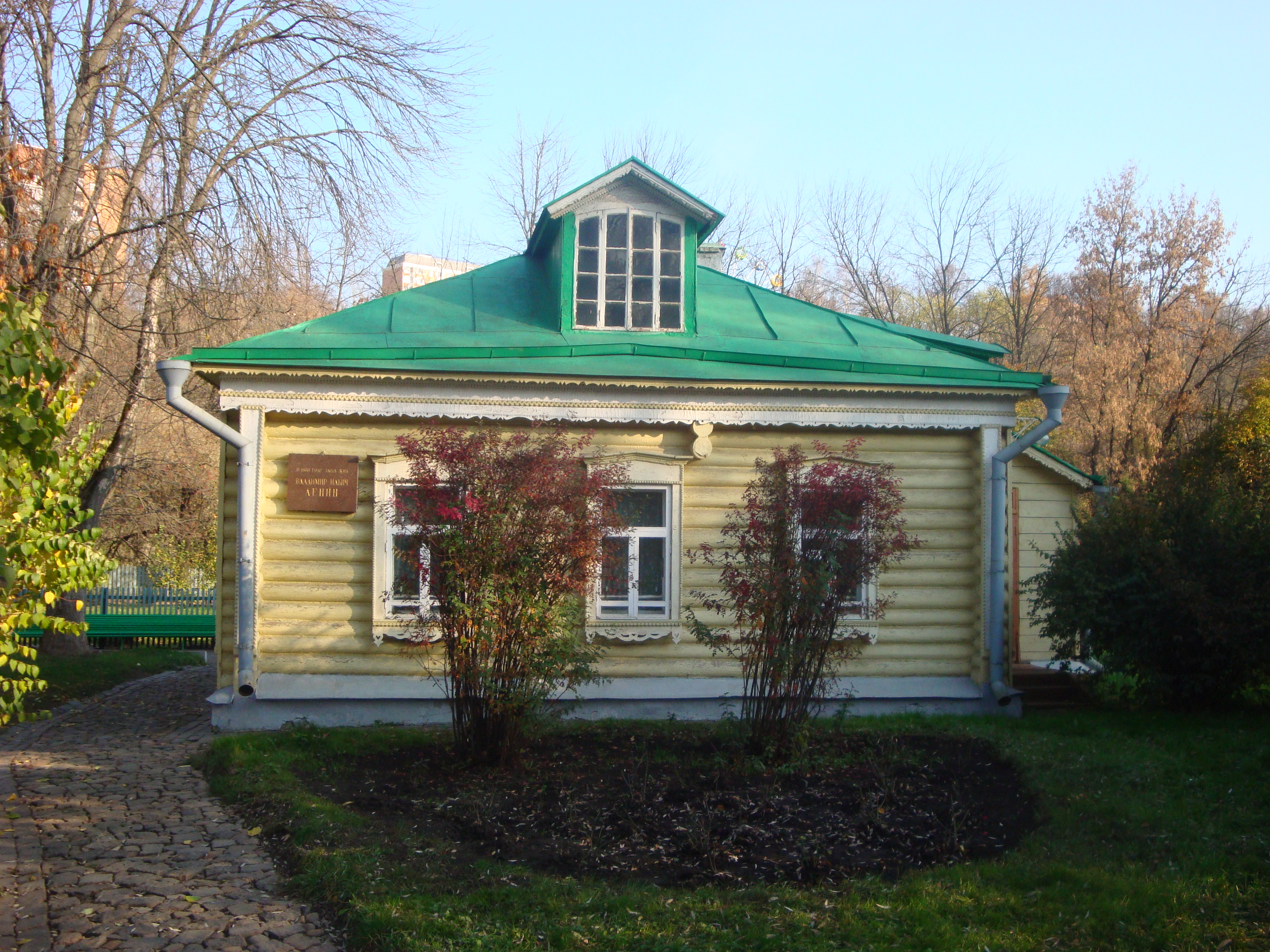
Memorial House-Museum of V. I. Lenin on the territory of the Historical and Memorial Museum-Reserve "Podillya"

At the same time, an organ of the Provisional Government was formed in Podolsk — the district committee of public organizations headed by Tikhomirov.

At the same time, there was a gradual strengthening of the Bolshevik position and an increase in their supporters. On March 3, a meeting was held on the establishment of the district committee of the RSDLP. In mid-March, the second party meeting was held in Podolsk, according to the decisions of which the Podolsk District Committee of the RSDLP was formed. At the same time, a course was taken to deepen the revolution and transform it from a bourgeois-democratic to a socialist one. On July 11 (24), the first issue of the Izvestia of the Podolsk Council of Workers' and Soldiers' Deputies (modern Podolsk Worker) was published, which became an important component of Bolshevik propaganda.

In general, July was marked by an increase in the revolutionary sentiments of the working class. In the struggle against socialist sentiments, a large part of the bourgeoisie of the Moscow region was forced to close their enterprises. However, this was not possible in Podolsk.: The Podolsk Council of Workers' and Soldiers' Deputies, which held a joint meeting on July 8, 1917, adopted a resolution "On the proposed closure of factories in Podolsk County," which included a number of anti-crisis measures, including the creation of a labor exchange. At the same time, relations between the Bolsheviks and the Mensheviks of Podolsk intensified, and all this time they adhered to passive behavior. The final separation between them occurred on July 7, when the Podolsk Mensheviks supported the shooting of a peaceful demonstration in Petrograd.

In September 1917, elections to the county zemstvo were held in Podolsk. The Bolsheviks won 15 out of 42 seats in the county zemstvo, and three out of four seats in the city.

Gradually, the authority and power of the Soviets grew, as did the Bolsheviks, who controlled the activities of the body. This, in turn, aggravated relations with the opponents of the revolution. For example, the civil district commissar Kruglikov threatened to arrest the Bolshevik faction in the county zemstvo and disarm the Bolsheviks. On the night of October 25, Podolsk Bolshevik Ewald, who was a delegate to the Second All-Russian Congress of Soviets of Workers' and Soldiers' Deputies, telegraphed the beginning of the socialist revolution. On October 25, a meeting of the Podolsk Council of Workers' and Soldiers' Deputies was held, at which it was announced the overthrow of the Provisional Bourgeois Government and the transfer of all power to the Soviets. The revolutionary committee of Podolsk was immediately elected, which developed a plan to seize power in the city, which was carried out without resistance on the same day. The situation was significantly complicated by the fact that the Provisional Government remained in power in Moscow. However, the revolutionary committee decided not to respond to the ultimatums, and stopped all attempts by former government officials to regain power in the city. On October 29, all industrial enterprises were shut down in Podolsk, and a detachment of volunteers was sent to Moscow to participate in the fighting. After the establishment of Soviet power in Moscow, it was finally consolidated in Podolsk.

=== The Soviet period ===
The first years after the overthrow of the monarchical government in Russia were quite difficult for Podolsk: there was a decrease in industrial production, unemployment increased, and the food and transport crises remained unresolved. Accounting and control over local production in Podolsk was carried out by the Podolsk District Committee of the party through Soviet organs. At the same time, the construction of a socialist economy began, which was reflected, first of all, in the nationalization of enterprises. So, in 1917, the Singer company leased its factory in the city to the Provisional Government, and in November 1918 it was nationalized by the Soviet government, which led to the suspension of main production. The first Soviet sewing machines began to be produced at the factory only in 1924. The cement and shell factories were also nationalized.

The outbreak of the Civil War forced the Soviet government to resume military production. Since many military factories in Russia were occupied by the White Guards, it was decided to build a new cartridge factory in Podolsk. He occupied part of the Zemgor shell factory. Since the autumn of 1919, it began to produce shell casings and redesign foreign cartridges. On May 2, 1919, the Podolsk Steam Locomotive Repair Plant (the future Ordzhonikidze Plant) was opened in Podolsk, which was deployed on the territory of cable and copper rolling plants.

During the years of the Civil War, there was a significant decrease in the city's population: in 1920, only about 12 thousand people lived in it. But after the end of the war and the beginning of industrial growth in the mid-1920s, Podolsk began to grow rapidly again: in 1926, the population amounted to 19.8 thousand people (this even led to overpopulation of the city due to dilapidated housing and increased unemployment). During these years, the industrial potential of the city was restored, many enterprises were re—launched, the production of textile equipment was established, and in 1923, the construction of residential buildings resumed. In 1926, the first bus was launched in Podolsk, and in 1927, Podolsk radio began broadcasting.

During the first five-year plans, further industrial growth was noted in the city. In 1931, the Podolsk Steam Locomotive Repair Plant was transformed into an electrical Cracking Plant (the first Soviet cracking apparatus for the oil industry was manufactured in record time). The capacity of the machine-building plant and the volume of production of sewing machines were increased, which were now completely assembled from domestic parts; in 1932, the largest foundry in Europe was introduced at the plant, and from July 1934 to 1939, it produced PMZ-A-750 motorcycles designed by P. V. Mozharov. The first batch was accepted by the People's Commissar of Heavy Industry Sergo Ordzhonikidze. Just before the war, the PMZ undertook to master the production of an exact replica of the Wanderer, a German motorcycle. And they even managed to produce a small batch of such machines, called Strela, before the plant was transferred to the production of defense products. In 1935, the Podolsk Battery Plant was opened in the city, which became the first in the USSR in terms of production of starter batteries since its foundation. Other large enterprises were built (a bakery, a fruit water factory, a meat processing plant, a foundry and a rolling mill, and others).

The development of industry led to an increase in the city's population: in 1926, 19.7 thousand people lived in Podolsk, then in 1939 — 72 thousand. Due to the shortage of land, on April 30, 1930, by the decision of the Presidium of the All-Russian Central Executive Committee, the villages of Vypolzovo, Dobratino, Ivanovskoye, Shepchinki and the village of the cement plant were included in the city limits, and in 1936 — Belyaevo, Salkovo, Fetishevo and forests of local importance. On June 11, 1936, the village of Kutuzovo and the work settlement of the former Kutuzovo farm, as well as the Kutuzovskaya Dacha forest of local importance, were annexed to Podolsk. At the same time, the Northern and Southern settlements of the plant were built up. Ordzhonikidze. In the mid-1930s, Mosoblproekt developed a plan for Bolshoy Podolsk, which provided for the division of the city into residential and industrial zones. During these years, new residential areas were built, housing and communal services were modernized. Special attention was paid to the transport component. In 1932, instead of a wooden bridge over the Pakhra, a concrete one was built, and on July 30, 1939, regular movement of Podolsk—Moscow electric trains began. A number of social facilities were also opened: the House of Culture named after Lepse (1930), the children's park of culture and recreation (1938), the educational and consulting center of the All-Union Correspondence Polytechnic Institute for employees of the city's enterprises (1935) was organized. With the outbreak of World War II, Podolsk, as Moskovskaya Pravda wrote in 1941, turned "into a fortress city that closed one of the far southern approaches to Moscow." Already in July 1941, a battalion of the people's militia was formed from the inhabitants of the city, which later joined the division of the People's militia of the Kirovsky district of Moscow, and in October a workers' regiment from the workers of the Kalinin factory went to the front. On October 5, 1941, the cadets of the Podolsk Infantry School were alerted and defended Maloyaroslavets for several days during fierce fighting. Despite the death of most of the personnel, the cadets, along with units of the 43rd Army, managed to hold off the onslaught of German troops and, thus, gain time to pull up reserves to Moscow and organize defense on the outskirts of the capital. As a result, the direction to Moscow via Podolsk along the Warsaw highway was closed to the enemy. On October 12, 1941, by order of the State Defense Committee, the city was included in the main defensive line of the Moscow defense zone. Although Podolsk was not bombed much in general, several German air raids were carried out, which tried to hit two targets: the bridge over the Pakhra River and the bank building on Strelka (now Lenin Square). As a result of the first raid on October 16, one of the bombs fell on the city military commissariat, as well as houses No. 14 and 27 on Fedorova Street, on October 20, a bomb destroyed house No. 15 on February Street. On October 27, 1941, a military pilot, deputy squadron commander of the 177th Fighter Aviation Regiment stationed at the airfield in Dubrovitsy, Hero of the Soviet Union, who shot down 6 aircraft and was one of the first to use a night ram, Viktor Vasilyevich Talalikhin, was killed in an air battle near Podolsk.

On September 11, 1943, the Central Women's Sniper Training School was transferred to Podolsk from the Amerovo summer camp, which operated for 27 months. In addition, 30 hospitals were deployed in the city and Podolsk district. In total, during the years of the Great Patriotic War, 40 thousand people were sent to the front by the Podolsk and Krasnopakhorsky military enlistment offices.

Thus, during the war years, the life of Podolsk was entirely subordinated to the goal of protecting the country from invaders. Podolsk industrial enterprises provided significant assistance to the front, which during the Great Patriotic War transferred all capacities from the production of civilian products to production for the defense industry: they manufactured ammunition, repaired tanks and other military equipment. Ordzhonikidze Machine-Building Plant produced armored hulls for T-40 tanks and Il-2 attack aircraft. By November 1941, the plant was completely evacuated from Podolsk. In its place, a numbered plant for the production of anti-tank hedgehogs, shovels, armored steam locomotives was deployed, and in 1942, the Krasny Kotelshchik plant, evacuated from Taganrog, continued boiler production in the city. On January 1, 1942, the famous Podolsk Worker armored train was handed over to the soldiers of the 43rd Army by workers of the Ordzhonikidze Machine-Building Plant.

After the end of the war, the city's enterprises were transferred to the production of peaceful products, which initially caused a sharp reduction in production (by 3 times in 1946 compared to the war period), despite the introduction of new enterprises — the Luch and GIREDMET experimental plants, the Gidropress Design Bureau plant. But already in 1948, industrial indicators exceeded the pre-war level. The mechanization of production was carried out, a movement for the rejection of subsidies unfolded, and a new impetus was given to the Stakhanov movement. The rapid development of industry in Podolsk made it possible to more than double the city budget in the first post-war five-year plan. In turn, the growth of capital investments in the urban economy contributed to the restoration and further development of urban infrastructure. Already in 1948, Podolsk took first place in the RSFSR cities improvement competition. In 1949–1950, the construction of the Pakhra dam was completed. The volume of construction also increased: new residential areas have appeared in Kutuzovo, Gulevo, on Krasnaya Gorka, in the southwestern part of Podolsk.

In the 1950s, the industrial development of Podolsk continued. A number of new plants were launched: construction machinery, building materials, and chemical and metallurgical (1954), and a round enamel pipe plant (1956). In the early 1950s, the general plan of the city was revised and clarified. According to him, the construction of residential buildings was mainly concentrated in the southwestern part of Podolsk, and in the eastern part it was prohibited. On June 10–11, 1957, mass riots took place in the city, caused by the murder of a detained driver by police officers. Despite the fact that the authorities qualified the performances as hooligan actions of a group of drunk citizens, about 3 thousand people participated in them. In 1959, 129 thousand people already lived in the city.

Over the following years, industrial enterprises in Podolsk achieved significant success, which had a positive impact on the development of the city as a whole and the quality of life of its population. In the 1960s, Podolsk was awarded the commemorative banner of the MK CPSU, the Moscow City Council, the Moscow City Council and the MK Komsomol, and on January 18, 1971, for the successes achieved by the city's workers in industrial production, the Order of the Red Banner of Labor. In 1962, the executive Committee of the Moscow City Council approved a new general plan for Podolsk: it provided for development based on progressive urban planning techniques, the construction of large neighborhoods with a population of 6–10 thousand people. The Novo-Syrovo work settlement was also included in the city. In 1979, the population of Podolsk was 201.7 thousand people, thus, it became the first among the cities of the Moscow region to cross the 200-thousandth milestone.

=== The modern period ===
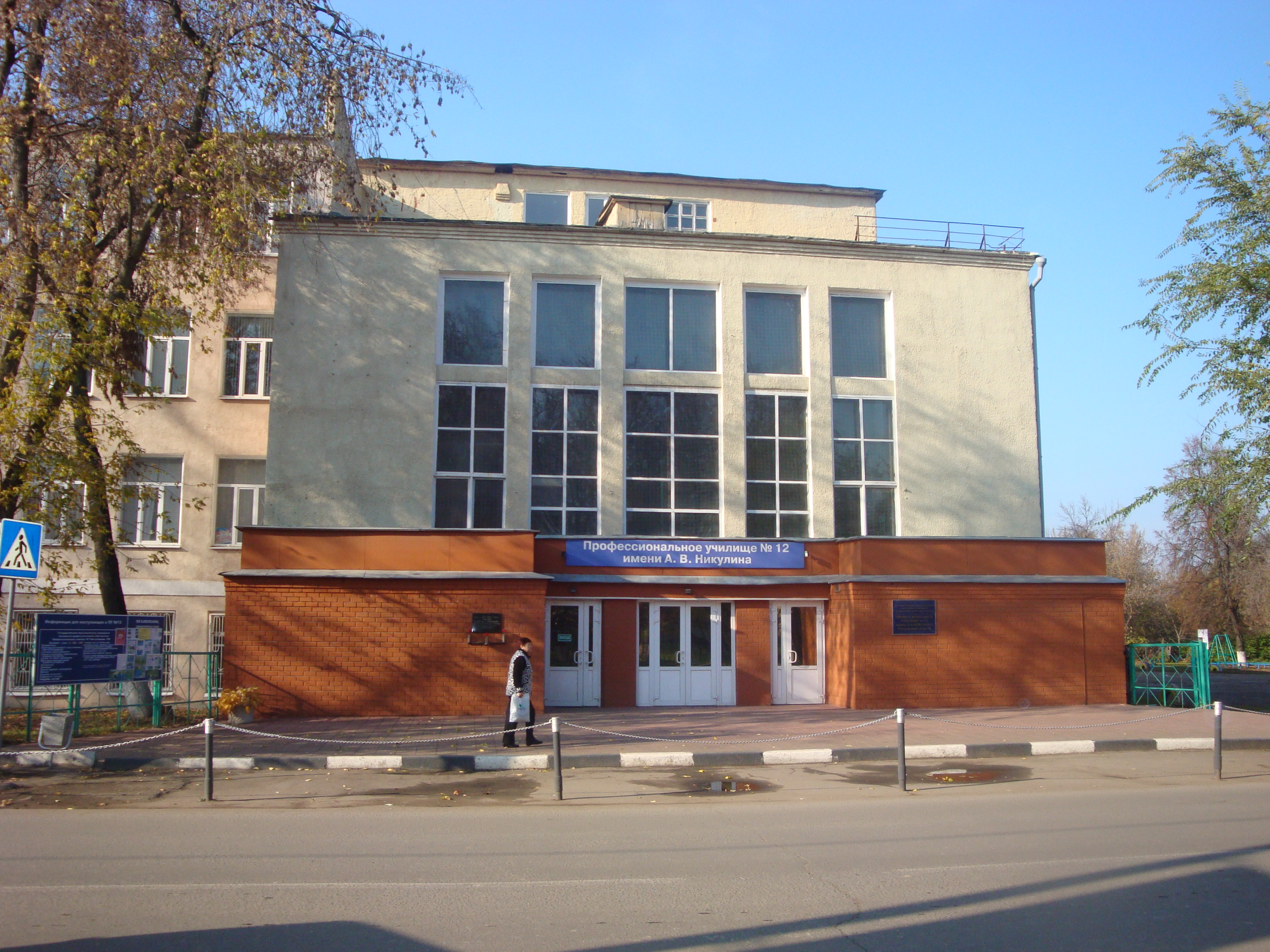
Vocational School No. 12 named after A.V.Nikulin in Podolsk

At the beginning of the 21st century, Podolsk was one of the largest industrial centers in the Moscow Region, with more than a dozen large industrial enterprises operating in various industries. In addition, Podolsk is one of the centers of high-tech science: it houses a large number of scientific enterprises of national importance and mainly related to nuclear engineering and nuclear research.

Despite serious difficulties in economic and social life shortly after the collapse of the USSR, Podolsk continued to develop in a progressive direction. In 1996, the first national elections of the head of the city were held, in which Alexander Vasilyevich Nikulin, who had served as chairman of the executive committee of the Podolsk City Council since 1990, won a convincing victory. In the period from 1996 to 1999, a number of important social facilities were opened in Podolsk: the Youth Palace (1996), the only blood gravity and pediatric gastroenterology departments in the Moscow region (1997), an ambulance station (1999), a Veterans' Home (1999), a blood transfusion station, and a drug treatment center. The center. Landscaping and road construction work also continued: in addition to the reconstruction of a number of streets (primarily Kirov and Kurskaya Streets) in 1998–1999, the Pakhra Bridge was commissioned in record time, replacing the old one. In 1993, the city's on-air television appeared in Podolsk.

In 1999, at the regular elections of the mayor, A. V. Nikulin was again elected to this position. On May 1, 2001, trolleybus traffic was opened in the city (currently five city routes are operating in Podolsk). On March 12, 2003, A. V. Nikulin prematurely resigned due to health reasons. From March 12 to May 26, 2003, Nikolai Igorevich Pestov was acting mayor of Podolsk.

In May 2003, Alexander Serafimovich Fokin became the new head of Podolsk. In 2004, Podolsk was granted the status of an urban district.

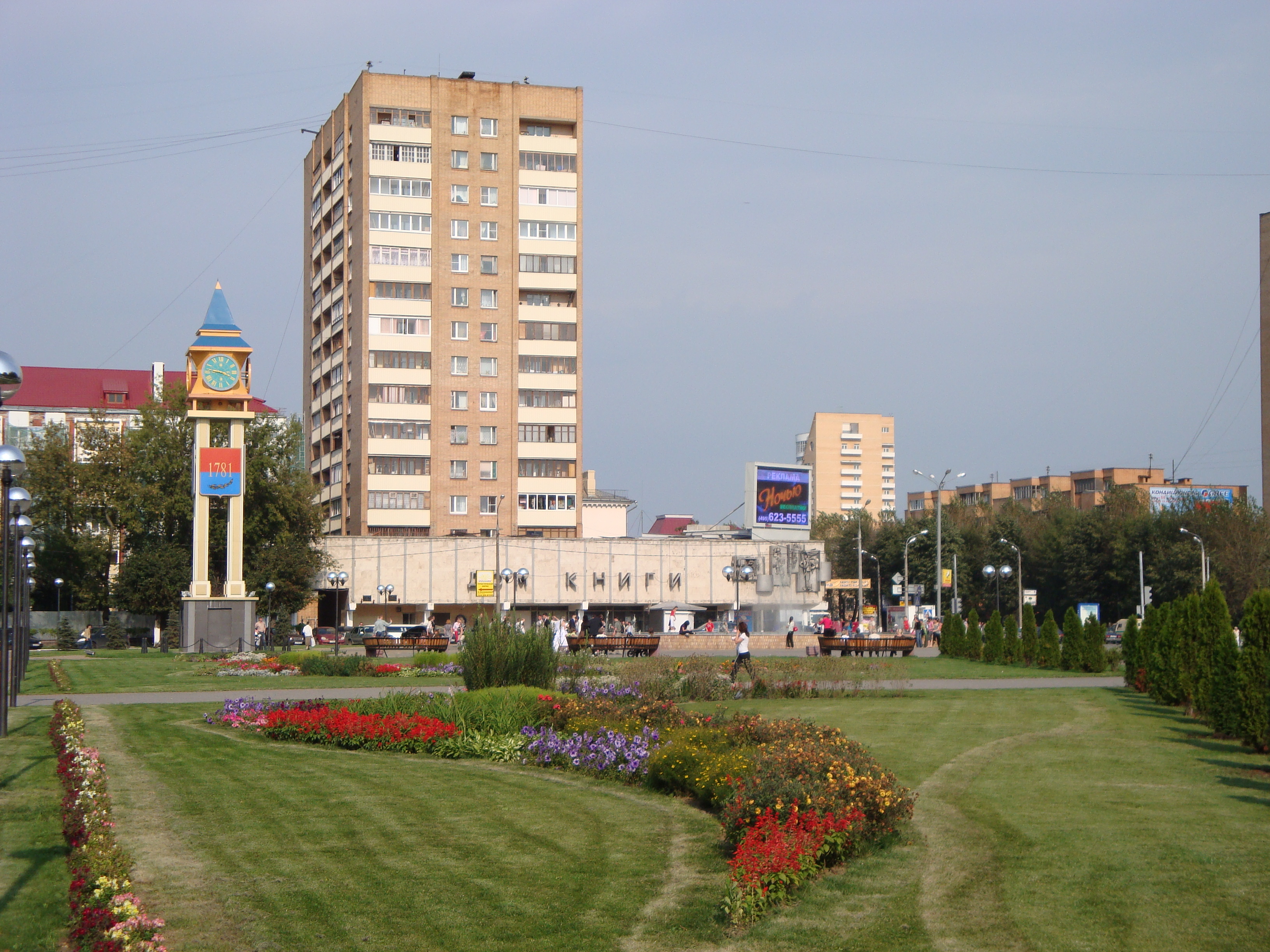
The Square of Generations. In the background is the House of Books

In 2005, the city became the center of a major scandal.: On April 22, the mayor of Podolsk was officially charged with organizing the murder of his main rival in the election campaign for the post of head of administration, First Deputy head of the Podolsk city Administration, Peter Zabrodin, who was shot by unknown assailants in a Volga company car near his own cottage in the village of Salkovo (Podolsk district (Moscow the region)). The Prosecutor of the Moscow Region, Ivan Sidoruk, charged Fokin with crimes under articles 30 (part 3) and 105 (Part 2) — attempted murder of three persons committed by an organized group, premeditated murder of two persons committed by an organized group, as well as article 222 (part 3) — illegal acquisition, possession, carrying, transfer, transportation of firearms and ammunition. On November 9, 2005, A. S. Fokin was found hanged in the ward of the prison hospital in the Matrosskaya Tishina detention center.

In December 2005, Nikolai Igorevich Pestov was appointed acting mayor of Podolsk. On March 12, 2006, he was elected mayor of the city (won 83.03% of the vote. In the period from 2006 to 2011, numerous landscaping measures were carried out in Podolsk: in 2006, the Generations Square was organized near Lenin Square, in which the city clock was installed; in 2008, the monument to Catherine II, who granted Podolsk the status of a city, was unveiled in the renovated Catherine Square. In addition, the House of Culture was renovated."October" with the reconstruction of the adjacent square, where a light and music fountain was installed; On the 65th anniversary of the Great Victory, on May 6, 2010, the renovated Glory Square (formerly the 50th Anniversary of October Square) was opened with a new composition "Home Front Workers" and a monument to internationalist soldiers. An important event in the life of the city was the opening on October 3, 2009, on City Day, of the overpass located on the 45th km of the Moscow-Serpukhov railway section / 11th km of the highway "Approach to Podolsk", in the area of the Kutuzovskaya platform. Due to the construction of an overpass over 500 m long (the total length of the motorway is 1200 m), the low—capacity railway crossing that existed here was eliminated.

In 2006, together with the State Unitary Enterprise MO NIiPI Urban Planning, the development of a new General Plan for Podolsk began, which has not been revised since 1975. Due to the active construction in the city and the expansion of the city district in early 2010 at the expense of the territories where the military district of the Ministry of Defense of the Russian Federation is located, the specialists faced the task of a comprehensive assessment of the existing buildings and the development of proposals for the integrated development of Podolsk, which would make the city comfortable to live in and at the same time create conditions for development of industrial potential. In October 2011, the General Plan was approved by the Government of the Moscow Region.

On March 13, 2011, regular elections for the Head of the city district were held in Podolsk, which were won by the former head of the city, N. I. Pestov, with 84.84% of the vote. Podolsk took the second place in 2012. in the ranking of the best cities in Russia according to the magazine "Secret of the Firm" (Kommersant publishing house).

In early 2015, a working group was formed on the issue of merging the city districts of Podolsk, Klimovsk and Podolsk municipal district into a single Podolsk city district. The commission includes representatives of all three transformed municipalities. A sociological survey conducted from April 11 to April 14 showed that by the time the public hearings on the merger began, more than 50% of the general population supported this initiative (although, for example, residents of the village of Lviv were rather negative). On June 1, 2015, the enlarged Podolsk city district was formed, including, in addition to Podolsk, 75 more settlements. At the same time, the territory of the city of Podolsk was also adjusted later: on July 3, 2015, the urban-type settlement of Lviv became part of Podolsk. On July 13, 2015, the city of regional subordination Klimovsk was abolished, becoming part of Podolsk.

On February 9, the mayor of the city, Nikolai Igorevich Pestov, decided to resign at his own request. On March 9, 2022, at a meeting of the city Council of Deputies, Dmitry Vyacheslavovich Zharikov, who had previously been acting head, was elected head.

On September 11, 2023, by Decree of the President of the Russian Federation, the city was awarded the honorary title of "City of Labor Valor".

== Flag and coat of arms of the city ==
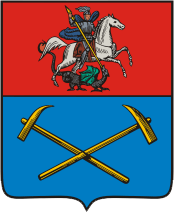
Coat of arms (1781 version)

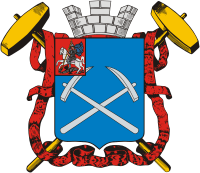
Coat of arms (1883 version)

Coat of arms since 2004

The current flag of Podolsk was approved on June 30, 2006 by decision No. 11/22 of the Podolsk City Council of Deputies. It is listed in the State Heraldic Register of the Russian Federation under No. 2641. The authors of the flag are Konstantin Mochenov (the idea of the flag), Kirill Peredonenko (justification of the symbolism), Galina Rusanova (artist and computer designer). The flag was designed taking into account the coat of arms created on the basis of the historical coat of arms of the district city of Podolsk, Moscow province, approved on March 16, 1883. The flag of the Podolsk city district is a rectangular panel with a width-to-length ratio of 2:3, divided into two parts: the smaller, red one, located in the upper part of the panel, occupies 1/5 of the length and the larger, blue one, bearing the image of two gold picks placed crosswise. The current coat of arms of Podolsk was approved on December 24, 2004 by Decision No. 30/17 of the City Council of Deputies (2nd convocation) and re-registered on June 30, 2006. The coat of arms is based on the historical coat of arms, which was approved on December 20, 1781. In lazarev (blue, blue) Shield with two golden pickaxes placed crosswise. The coat of arms of the Moscow Region is displayed in the free part. The coat of arms is listed in the State Heraldic Register under No. 1801. The coat of arms can be reproduced in two equally valid versions.: without a free part; with a free part — a quadrangle adjacent from the inside to the upper edge of the coat of arms of the municipal formation "Podolsk city district of the Moscow region" with the figures of the coat of arms of the Moscow region reproduced in it. The coat of arms of Podolsk can also be executed in a solemn image using external decorations in the form of a ribbon of the Order of the Red Banner of Labor, received by the Podolsk city district on January 18, 1971, according to a Decree of the Presidium of the Supreme Soviet of the USSR, and a status crown in the form of a pentadent, defining the status of the city — "urban district".

The objects and colors on the coat of arms and flag of Podolsk symbolize the following:

Pickaxes represent the industrial orientation and historical activity of the city's residents.

Gold is a symbol of strength, strength, justice and confidence in the future.

Azure (blue, light blue) is a symbol of honor, sincerity, and virtue.

Red is a symbol of belonging to the Moscow region and affirming the triumph of labor, courage, and the power of life.

== Administrative and municipal status ==
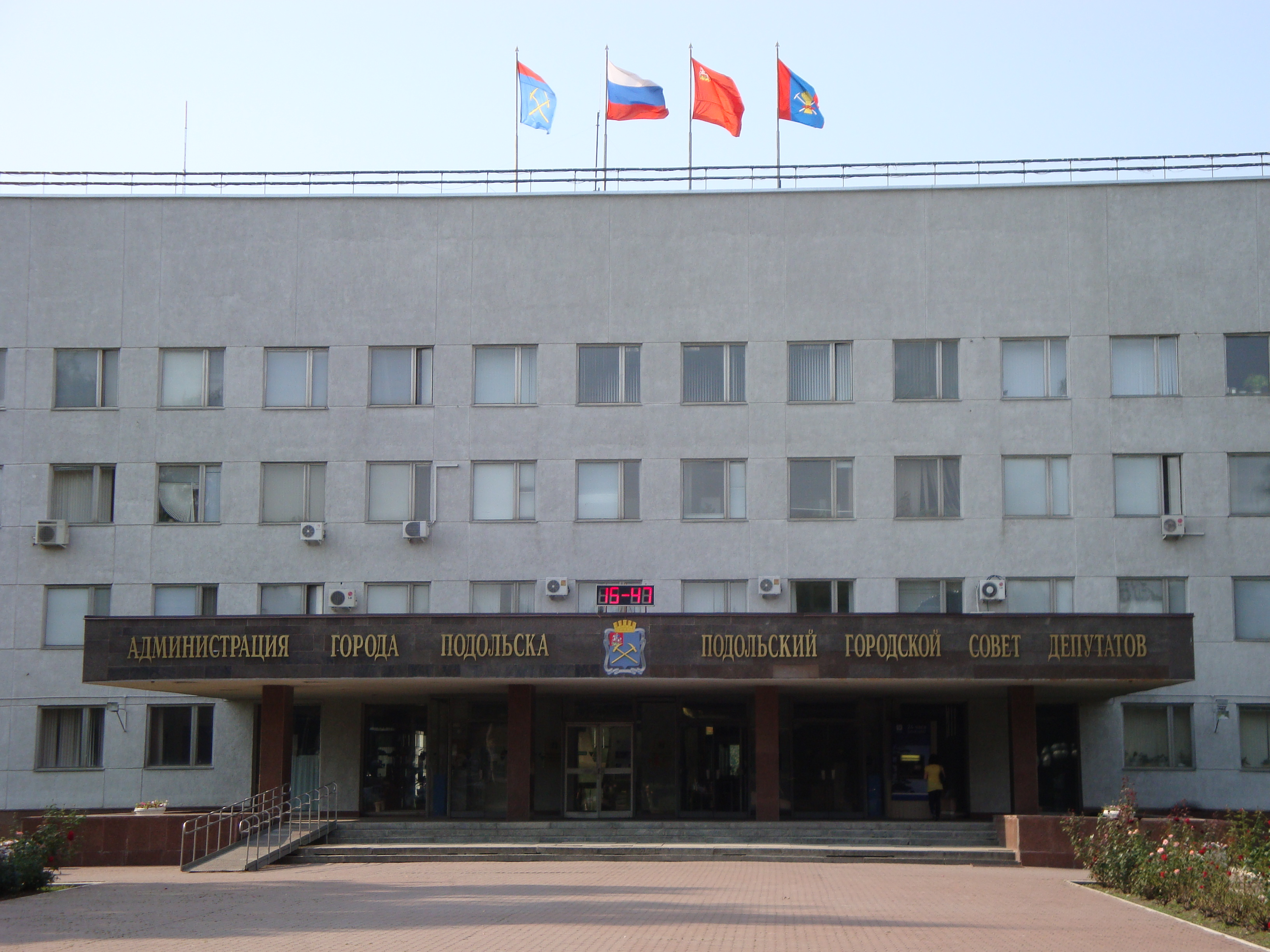
Administration and Council of Deputies of Podolsk

The main regulatory legal act of the city of Podolsk, which establishes the system of local self-government, the legal, economic and financial foundations of local self-government and guarantees for its implementation on the territory of the city, is the Charter of the municipal formation Podolsk City District of the Moscow Region, adopted by the decision of the Podolsk City Council of Deputies of the Moscow region on March 14, 2007.

The structure of local self—government bodies of Podolsk consists of: the representative body of the city – the Council of Deputies of the city district, the Head of the city district, the Administration of the city district, the Control Body of the city district, which have their own powers to resolve issues of local importance. The local self-government bodies of the city of Podolsk are not included in the system of state authorities.

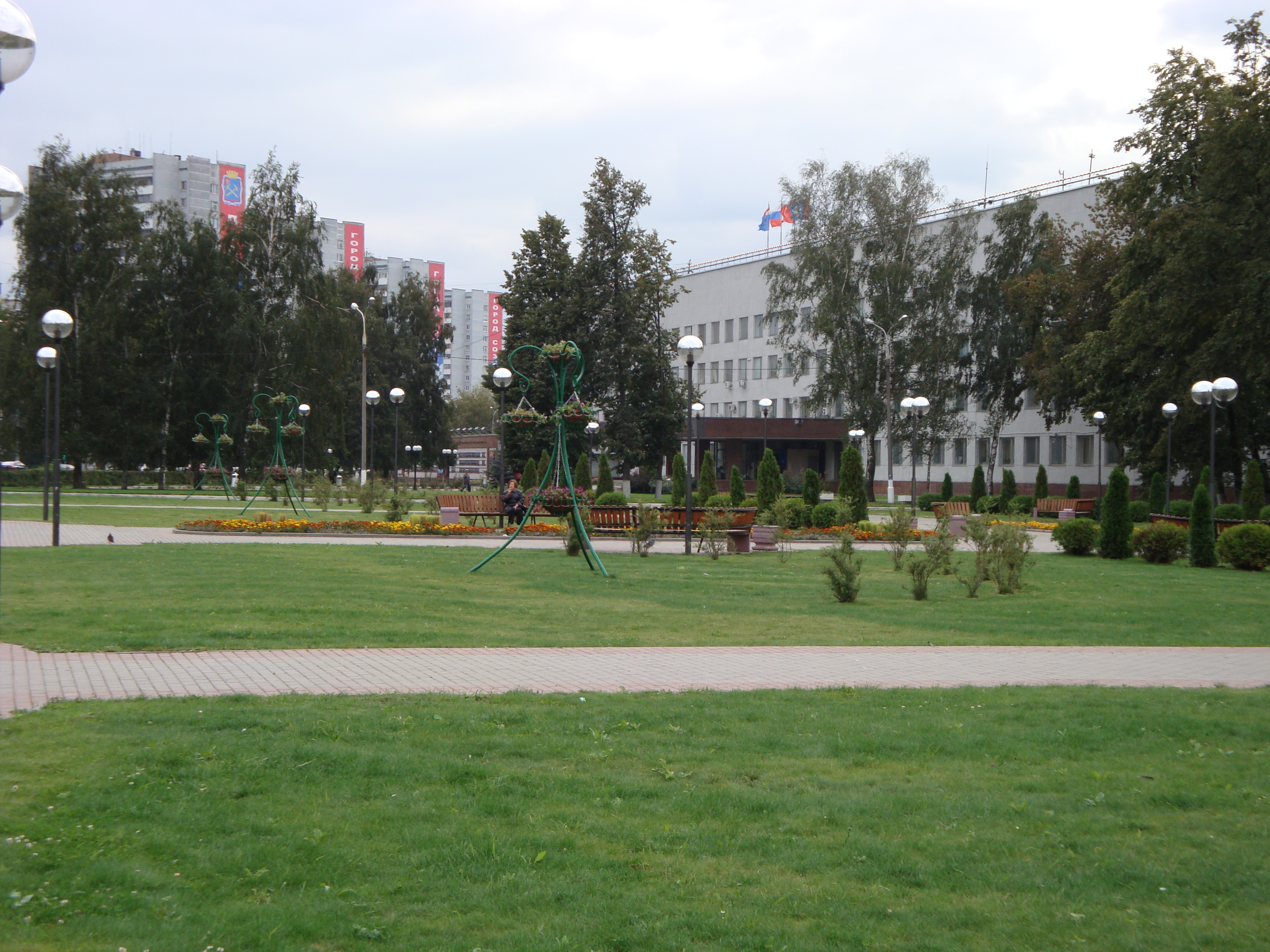
In the square in front of the Administration building

The Podolsk City Council of Deputies is a representative body of local self—government, consisting of 25 deputies elected in single-mandate districts by secret ballot on the basis of universal, equal and direct suffrage for a period of 5 years.Deputies are elected according to the majority system in 25 single-member districts. A citizen of the Russian Federation who has the right to vote in accordance with federal law, as well as a citizen of a foreign state permanently residing in the territory of the city of Podolsk on the basis of an international treaty of the Russian Federation, may be elected a deputy of the City Council of Deputies in accordance with the procedure established by law. Deputies exercise their powers, as a rule, on a non-permanent basis. No more than 10% of the deputies of the established number of the City Council of Deputies can work on a permanent basis. Chairman of the City Council of Deputies (currently Dmitry Nikolaevich Mashkov)) and the deputy chairman of the City Council of Deputies (Gennady Nikolaevich Khryachkov) are elected from among the deputies in accordance with the procedure established by the Regulations of the City Council of Deputies, and work on a permanent basis.The head of the city is the highest official of the city of Podolsk., to be elected by citizens residing in the territory of the city and having the right to vote, on the basis of universal, equal and direct suffrage by secret ballot for a period of 5 years. On December 1, 2023, Grigory Igorevich Artamonov was unanimously elected the new head of the city by the Council of Deputies. The head of the city is controlled and accountable to the population and the City Council of Deputies.

The city administration is a legal entity and performs executive and administrative functions. She is accountable to the City Council of Deputies on issues of its competence and to State bodies on issues related to the powers of these bodies. The city administration is formed by the Head of the city in accordance with the structure of the City Administration approved by the City Council of Deputies.

The control body of the city of Podolsk is formed for the purpose of monitoring the execution of the local budget, compliance with the established procedure for preparing and reviewing the draft local budget, the report on its execution, as well as for monitoring compliance with the established procedure for managing and disposing of property owned by the municipality. The Control body is formed by the City Council of Deputies and exercises its powers in accordance with the Regulations on the Control Body.

== Transport ==
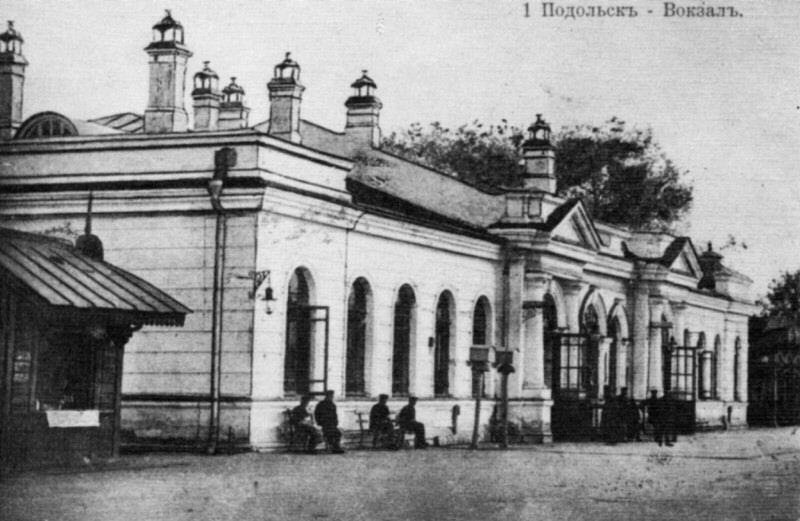
Podolsk railway station, 1889

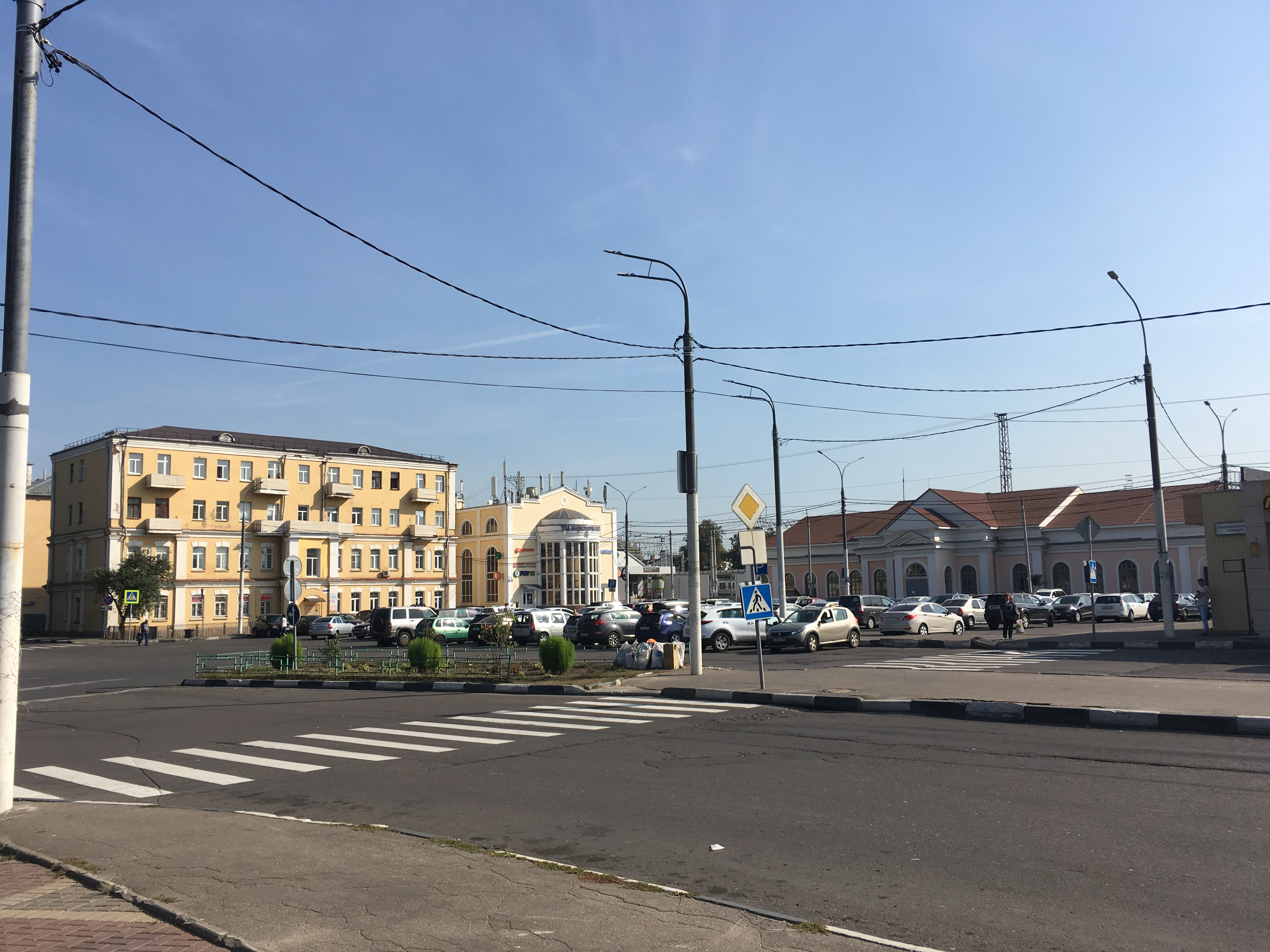
Podolsk Railway station square, 2018

The city of Podolsk was connected by railway to Moscow in 1865 in connection with the construction of the Moscow-Kursk Railway, which was finally completed in 1871. The stone city railway station, which was originally planned to be built two kilometers from the city near the village of Shepchinki (currently one of the subdistricts of Podolsk), was built only in 1889 by engineer E. Ya. Skornyakov (before that it was wooden). The advent of the railway had a huge impact on the development and economy of the city: horse-drawn traffic was reduced, a highway was laid from the station to the city itself, and the development of industry was given an impetus.

Currently, the Moscow—Kharkov—Sevastopol railway passes through Podolsk, and the Silikatnaya platform, Podolsk station, and Kutuzovskaya platform are located on the territory of Podolsk. All suburban electric trains stop at Podolsk station, for some it is the final one. There is a direct connection via Moscow to Riga and Smolensk (Byelorussian) destinations.

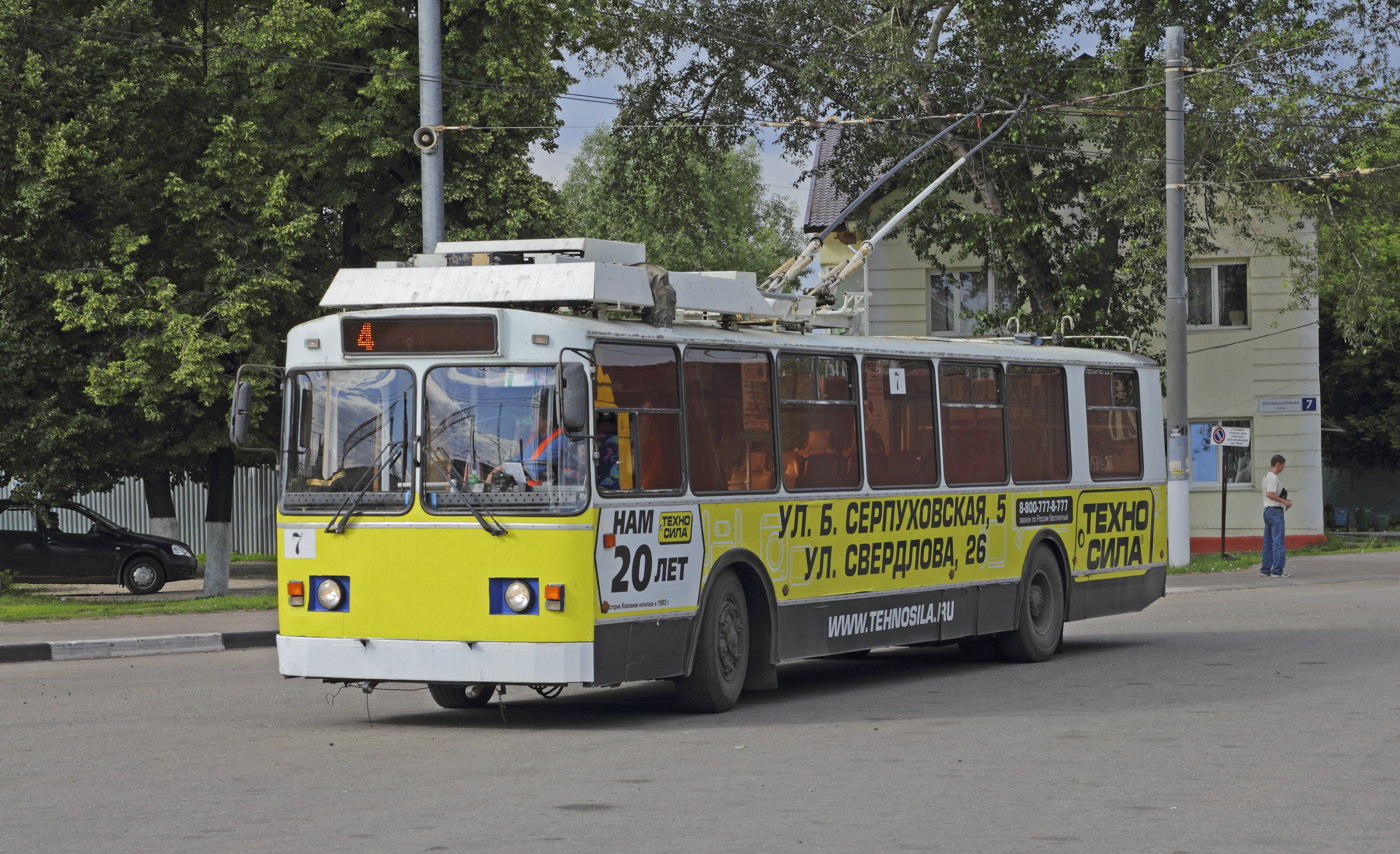
Trolleybus ZiU-682 in Podolsk, Moscow Oblast

The journey from Podolsk station to Tsaritsyno MCD-2 station (the nearest station connected to the metro) takes 25–30 minutes. Long-distance trains do not stop in Podolsk.

There is a bus station at the railway station on Privokzalnaya Square, from which suburban buses and minibuses depart to Moscow to the Lesoparkovaya metro station (No. 407), passengers also disembark at the Annino and Dmitry Donskoy Boulevard metro stations (No. 516). In addition, there are routes that directly connect individual neighborhoods of the city with Moscow. (№ 406, 413, 435, 446, 462, 520, 1004). Buses also depart from the bus station to other cities of the Moscow region (Domodedovo, Klimovsk, Vidnoye, Chekhov, etc.) and Moscow (Troitsk, Shcherbinka), to towns and villages of the Podolsk district.

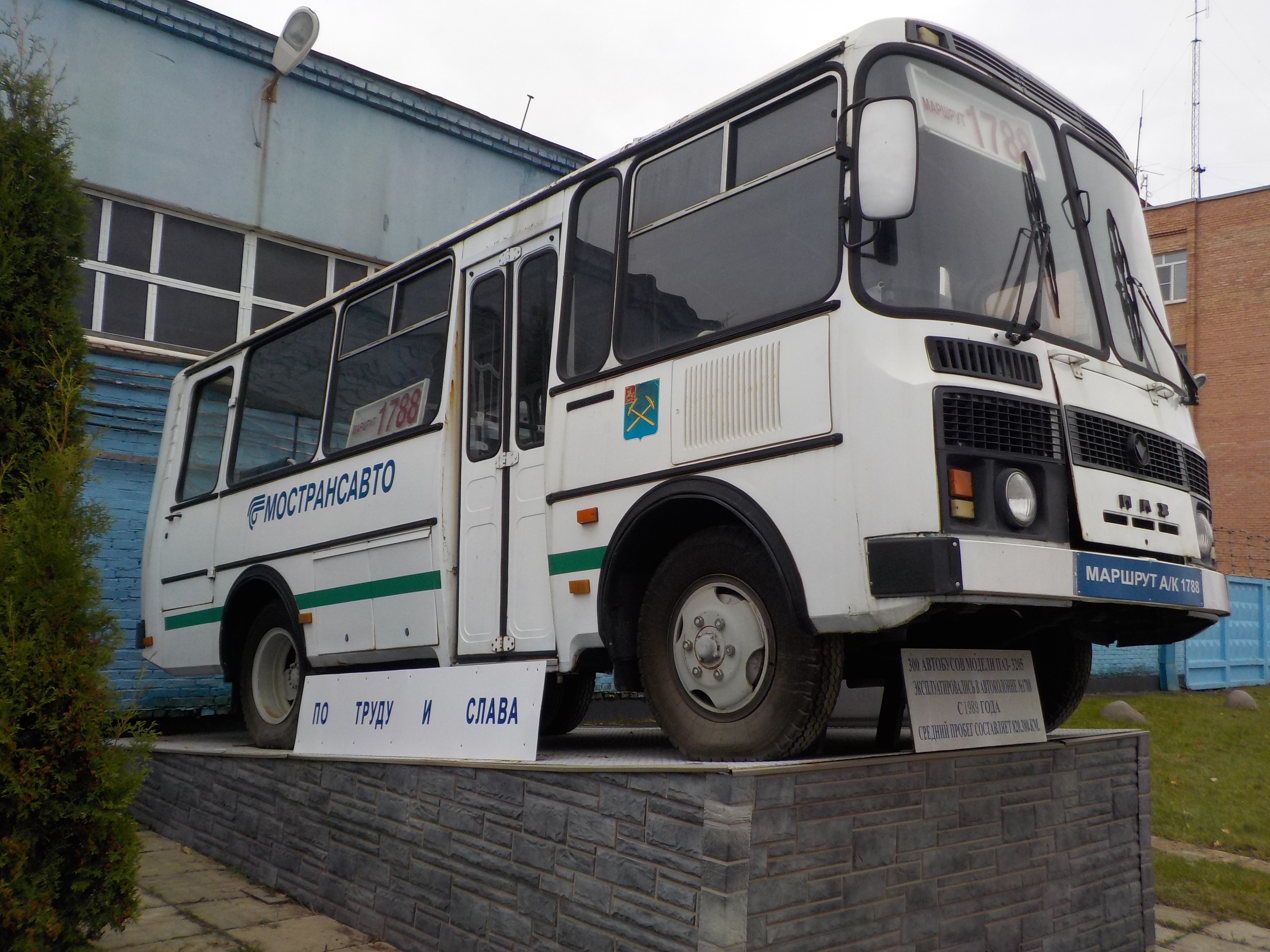
Bus PAZ, installed on a/k 1788, model PAZ-3205

The M2 Crimea federal highway runs 1 km east of Podolsk, the Varshavskoye Highway passes through the city, and the old Simferopol Highway also originates here. Podolsk has bus and trolleybus services, 5 trolleybus routes (traffic was opened on May 1, 2001 on the section from Podolsk station to the Jubilee microdistrict) and several dozen bus routes. Podolsk is one of the few cities in Russia where trolleybus lines are currently being built. In 2008, 13.3 million people were transported by trolleybuses of the Municipal Unitary Enterprise Podolsk Trolleybus, including 6.9 million preferential passengers. The main carriers in the city are the branch of the State Unitary Enterprise MO "Mostransavto" "MAP No. 5 Podolsk" (former. Convoy No. 1788), Municipal Unitary Enterprise Podolsk Trolleybus, LLC Avtomigtrans. In total, over 30 million people were transported in 2008, including 11.8 million privileged passengers. The length of the urban route network was 1,137.9 km. Bus routes No. 1004, c924, c996 and MC3 are also operated by the State Unitary Enterprise Mosgortrans.

In November 2013, at the initiative of convoy No. 1788, a monument to the PAZ bus was erected in the city, and the PAZ-3205 model was immortalized on the pedestal.

== Culture ==
=== Temples and churches ===
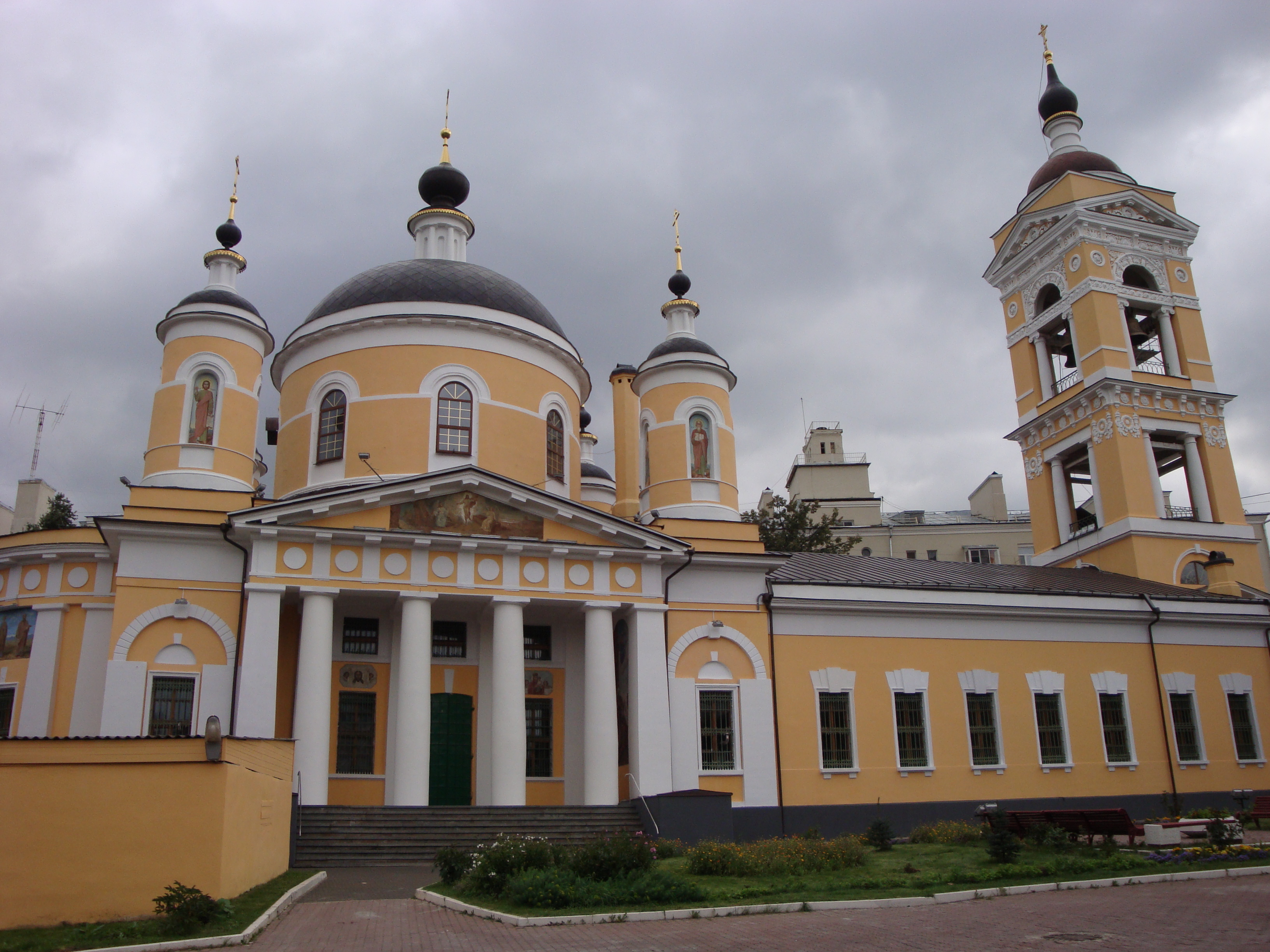
Trinity Cathedral in Podolsk

There are several Orthodox churches in the city, among which are the Cathedral of the Holy Trinity (also popularly known as Holy Trinity Cathedral or Trinity Cathedral) and the Church of the Resurrection of the Living (Renovation of the Church of the Resurrection of Christ in Jerusalem).

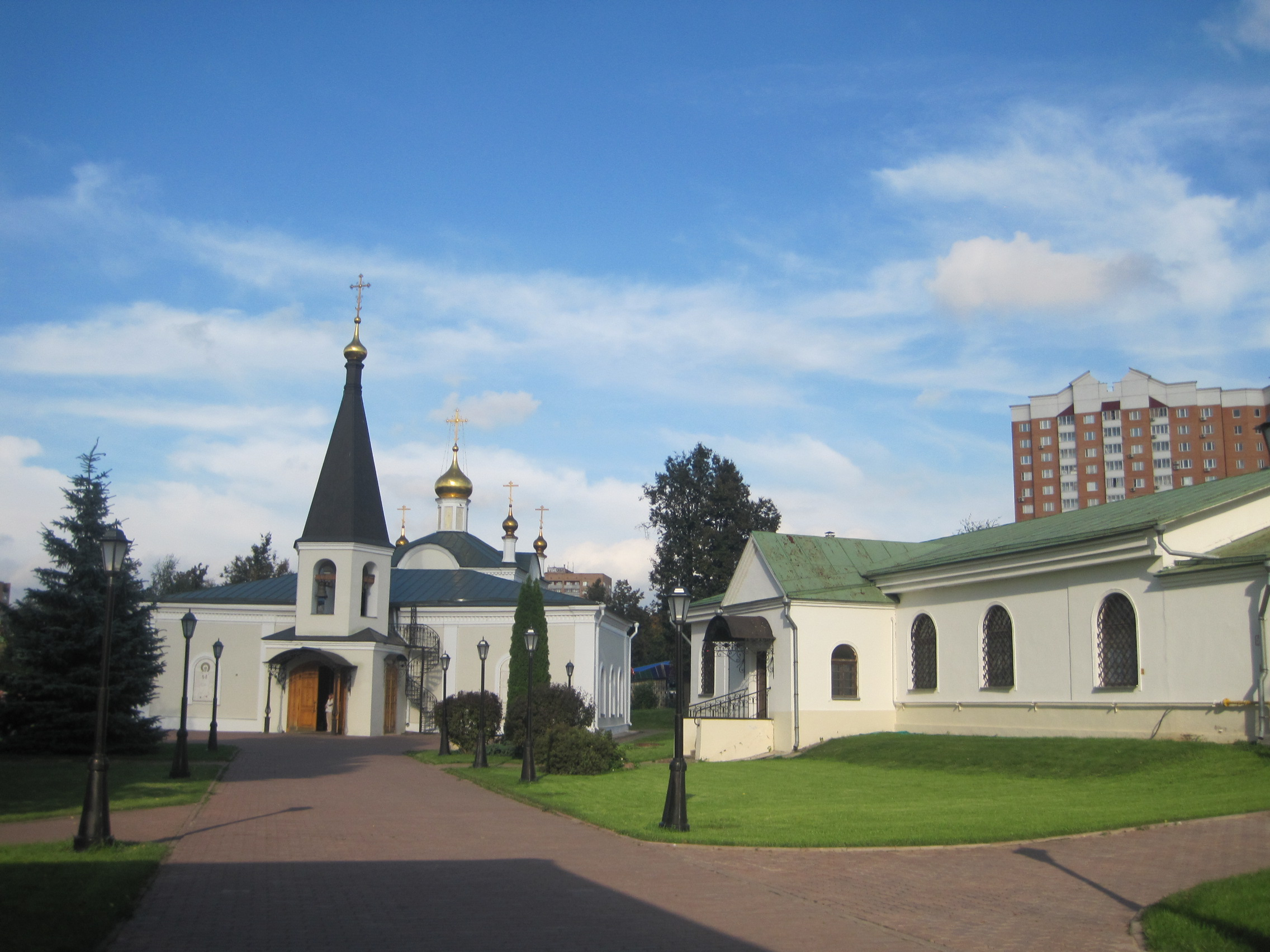
Church of the Resurrection of the Living in Podolsk

The most famous of them is the Trinity Cathedral, built in 1819–1832 in honor of the victory in the Patriotic War of 1812. and it is a five-domed Empire-style cathedral with a three-nave refectory and a three-tiered bell tower. Among the temples of the southern Moscow region, the Trinity Cathedral is the only one with a five-domed completion.. The architect of the cathedral is Osip Ivanovich Bove, famous for the reconstruction of Moscow after the fire of 1812. The Trinity Cathedral was created as a compositional center of urban development, so a high hill above the Pakhra River was chosen for its construction. The Trinity Cathedral has its own shrines: it is the Jerusalem Icon of the Mother of God, revered by Christians for allegedly ridding the city of cholera in 1866, two relics with fragments of the relics of 140 saints, the icon of the New Martyrs of Podolsk.. During the Soviet era, the Trinity Cathedral was the only active city cathedral in the Moscow region..

One of the oldest churches in Podolsk is the Church of the Resurrection of the Living (or simply the Resurrection Church) on Krasnaya Street, which is mentioned in the scribal books of 1627–1628, when the village of Podol, which was the patrimony of the Moscow Danilov Monastery, was located on the territory of the modern city.. The first church was wooden, which caused a fire in 1722. In 1728, an appeal for the construction of a stone church was sent to the Synodal State Order. But after receiving permission, the construction of the temple was delayed for 40 years. At the end of the 18th century, the Resurrection Church became the cathedral church of the city, and the cathedral rector became the dean of the churches of the Podolsk district of the Moscow diocese. However, after the construction of the Trinity Cathedral, the temple became the city cemetery church. In the middle of the 19th century, the church was renovated, and an independent parish was restored. But with the establishment of Soviet power, church property was confiscated, and in March 1929, the Resurrection Church was closed. There were even plans to redevelop the Orthodox church as a museum of local lore with the installation of a revolutionary department in the main altar of the church. Subsequently, the church was significantly destroyed (including the bell tower), and it was turned into a workshop for the manufacture of tombstones. An industrial college was built in the adjacent cemetery, where those who died from the cholera epidemic of 1848 were buried and closed in 1924, as well as sports and playgrounds. Subsequently, the church was used for other economic purposes. The first Divine Liturgy took place only in 1995. In the period from 1995 to 1999, the Resurrection Church was actually revived.

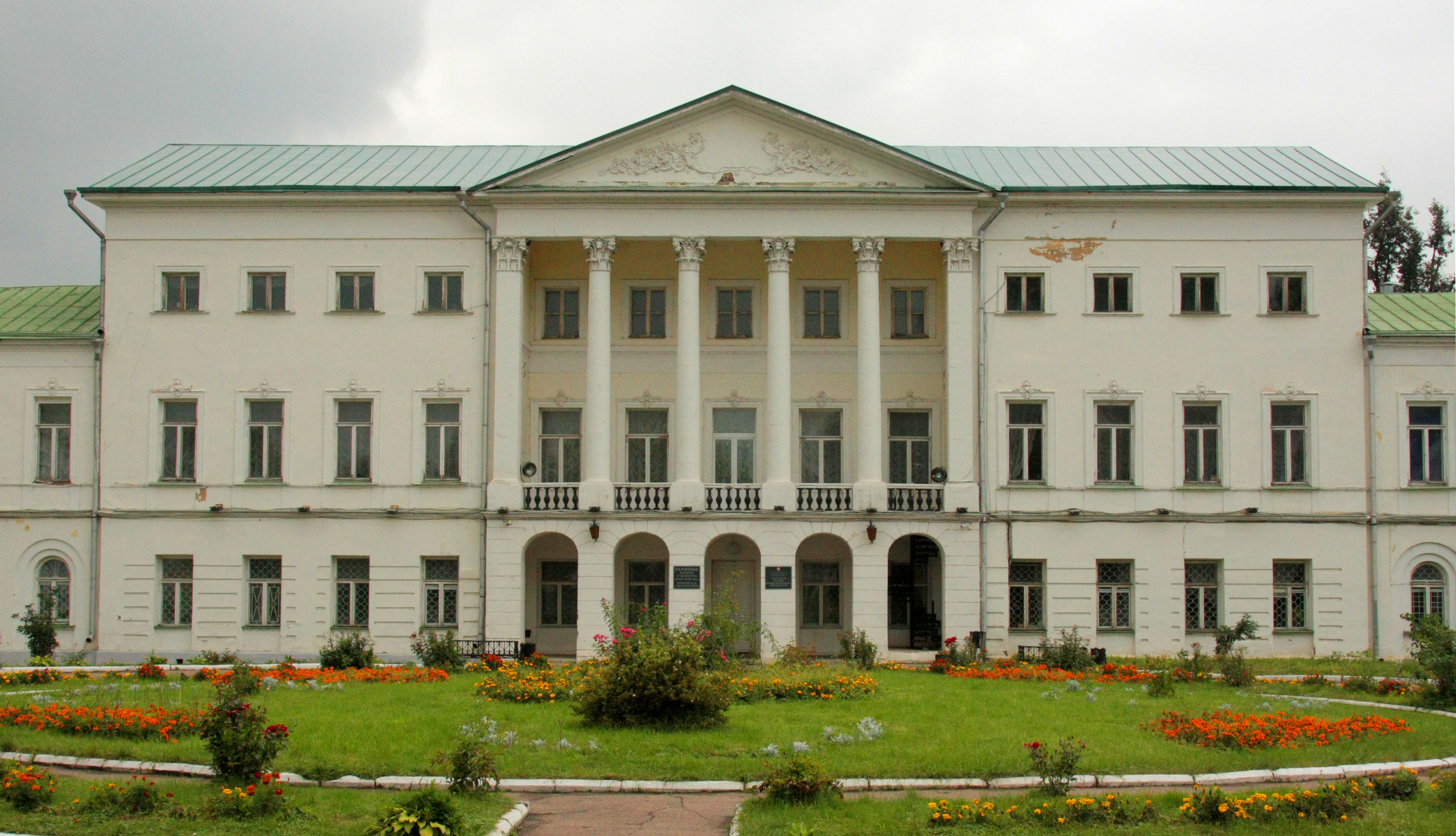
Ivanovskoye Estate (Moscow region, Podolsk, Volodarsky settlement (Ivanovskoye village, 1 Park Street)

=== Farmsteads ===
Ivanovskoe One of the famous sights of the city is the former Ivanovskoye estate, which currently houses the Museum of Local Lore and the Museum of Professional Education of Russia. Ivanovskoye was first mentioned as a patrimonial possession in the scribal books of 1627. At the end of the 17th century, the estate belonged to Ivan Ivanovich Golovin and his heirs, Field Marshal Mikhail Fedotovich Kamensky in the second half of the 18th century. At the end of the XVIII century, Ivanovskoye passed into the possession of the senator, the great-uncle of Leo Nikolaevich Tolstoy, Count Fyodor Andreevich Tolstoy. It was by his order that the manor's art complex was created. The compositional axis of the estate runs along the driveway, through the center of the manor palace and further along the terraces to the Pakhra River. There is a three—storey building in the center of the ensemble. The wing housings are extended along the Groin, the side wings are extended forward. There is a park pavilion not far from the main entrance. A two-story theater building was built in line with the main house, away from which there was a utility yard.. After the death of Fyodor Tolstoy, the estate passed to the Count, Governor-General of Finland (1823), and Moscow (1848–1859). To Arseniy Andreevich Zakrevsky, who carried out the reconstruction of Ivanovsky: passages connecting the central part of the building with the wings were built, a church was located in the eastern wing, and a fence with stone gates was installed.. Subsequently, Ivanovskoye was owned by Countess Agrafena Fedorovna Zakrevskaya, Countess Sofia Vasilyevna Keller and the Bakhrushin family, who donated the estate to the Moscow City Government in 1916 for the establishment of a medical and educational institution for orphaned children.

==== Pleshcheyevo ====
The lands on which the former Pleshcheyevo estate is currently located have been known since the 14th century, when they belonged to the Chernigov Prince Fyodor Byakont. His youngest son, Alexander, a former boyar of Dmitry Donskoy, was nicknamed Pleshchey for his broad-shouldered figure, becoming the ancestor of the famous Pleshcheyev family (hence the name of the estate). In the 17th century, these lands passed to the boyars of Morozov, and later to Vasily Petrovich Pospelov (after him, the peasants named the estate Pleshcheyevo Pospelov or Pospelkov). Since the second half of the 17th century, Pleshcheyevo-Pospelovo belonged to the state councilor Alexander Ivanovich Perepechin. At the beginning of the 19th century, Pleshcheyevo passed to Prince Alexander Alexandrovich Cherkassky, who in 1820 commissioned the architect Yevgraf Dmitrievich Tyurin to design his estate. As a result, a brick main house in the classical style and the first floor of the human wing were built (the second floor was later erected by architect Dmitry Andreevich Koritsky). Subsequently, the estate was owned by the Lazarov family, and then by von Meck. At their invitation, the Russian composer Pyotr Ilyich Tchaikovsky visited Pleshcheyevo in 1884 and 1885., who wrote the "Concert Fantasy" here. In 1908, the owners transferred the estate to a cement factory. In 1919, the estate housed a children's labor colony, since 1925 — a tuberculosis dispensary, during the Great Patriotic War — Podolsk women's sniper school.

The house Museum of V. I. Lenin is also noteworthy. The Ulyanov family lived in Podolsk for some time, and Lenin visited the city more than once.

=== Urban sculptures ===
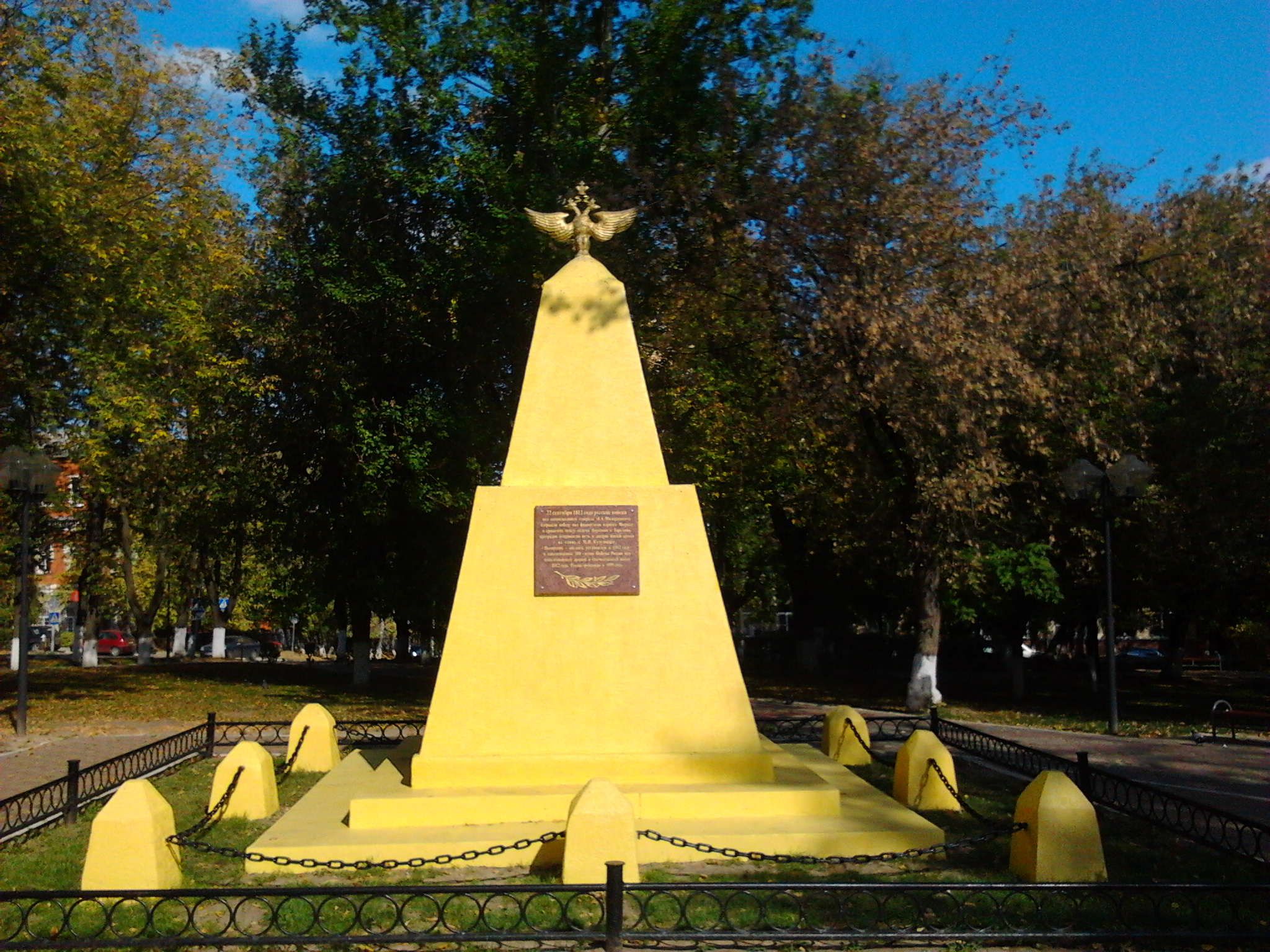
Monument in Podolsk dedicated to the Tarutino maneuver of 1812

There are many monuments, memorials, and plaques in the city. The most famous of them are:

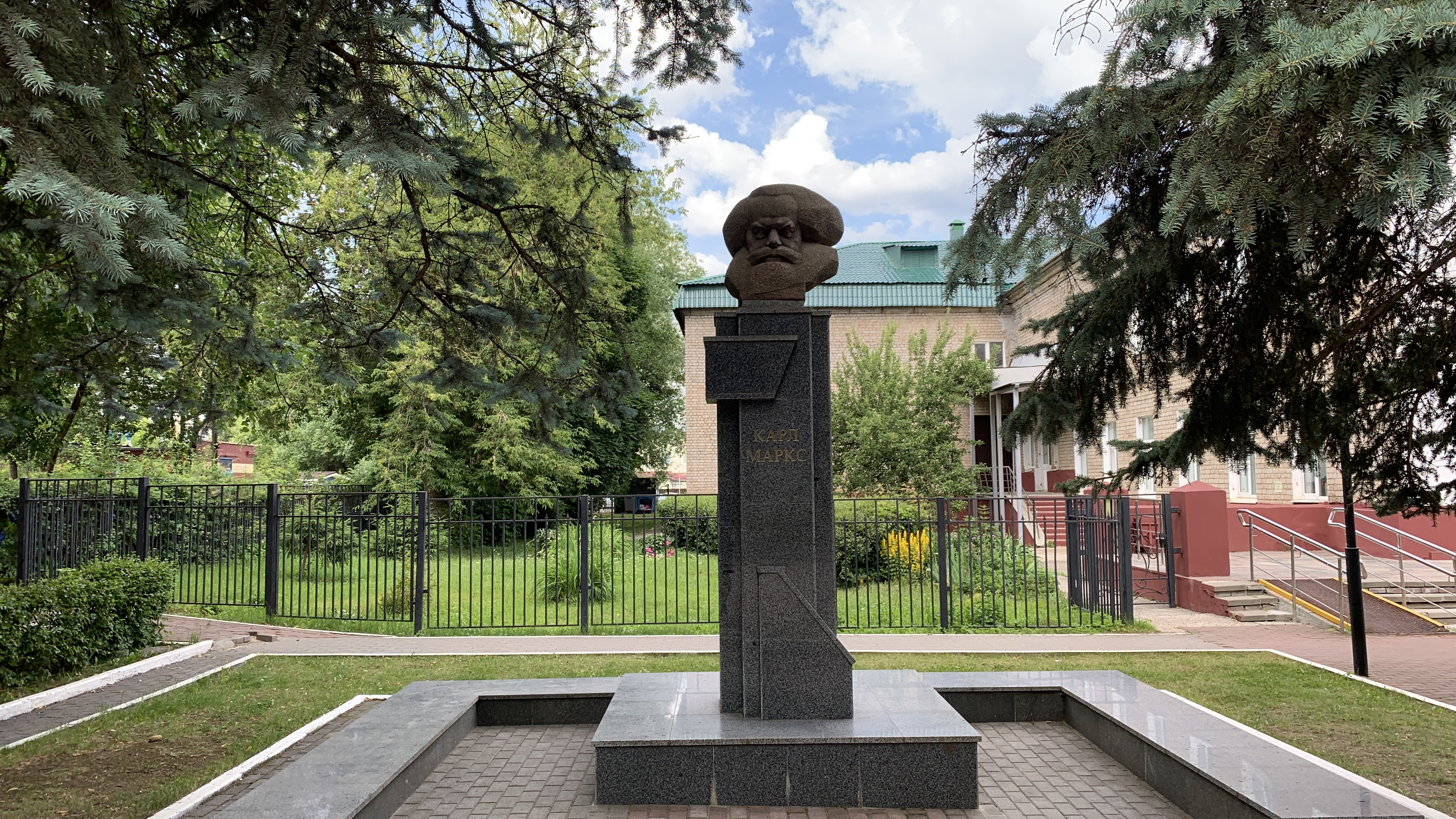
- Monument to Karl Marx (Podolsk)
  Monument to Lenin. The sculptor is Z. I. Azgur, the architect is L. P. Zemskov. It was installed on the central square of the city, named in his honor, on October 29, 1958, on the site of a two-story wooden hotel, popularly called the "Peasant's House." The leader of the October Socialist Revolution visited the city in July 1900. Earlier, in May 1898, the Ulyanov family settled in Podolsk. Letters from Lenin, who was in exile in Siberia at the time, were sent to the city with instructions to publish his works and to connect with the revolutionary underground. During the days spent in Podolsk, Lenin thought through the difficult issues of transporting the first all-Russian illegal Marxist newspaper from abroad to Russia, planned illegal appearances and addresses (all that ensured the publication of Iskra).
- Monument to the cadets of the Podolsk military schools, who, together with units of the 43rd Army, held back the onslaught of the Nazi troops and helped to gain time to pull up reserves to Moscow. During the Battle for Moscow, Podolsk cadets destroyed about 5,000 German soldiers and officers, 100 tanks and armored personnel carriers. The monument was unveiled on May 7, 1975 at the intersection of Kirov Street, Park Street and Archive Passage. The construction of the monument was entrusted to the S. Ordzhonikidze Machine-building Plant.
- Architectural and sculptural ensemble on the Square of Glory (formerly the Square of the 50th Anniversary of October), dedicated to the Great Patriotic War of 1941–1945. The authors are Yu. Lyubimov and L. Zemskov. It was installed in November 1971. On a large concrete slab are carved Soviet soldiers rushing into battle with grenades and machine guns, as well as the words: "To the heroes of Podolsk, who defended their Homeland, honor and freedom with their lives." In 2010, the ensemble was reconstructed: to the right of the slab with the carved Soviet soldiers and the stele, a memorial complex was opened to the military and labor exploits of Podolsk residents during the Great Patriotic War. The eternal Flame was placed in front of the reconstructed stele. In addition, the complex includes a monument to fellow countrymen who died while performing international duty in Afghanistan and combat missions in Chechnya (sculptor — Honored Artist of Russia A. A. Rozhnikov, architect M. V. Tikhomirov). At the same time, after the appeal of the Council of Veterans of War, Labor, the Armed Forces and law enforcement agencies to the city administration, it was decided to name the square the Square of Glory.
- Monument-obelisk to Miloradovich's grenadiers who fell on Podolsk land in 1812. It was consecrated and opened on October 1, 1912, to mark the 100th anniversary of the Patriotic War of 1812. The initiators of the monument's creation were the Podolsk City Administration and the Zemstvo. Authors: sculptor Chernyshev (cast zinc eagle production), engineer Grigoriev (construction supervision). It is located on Cathedral Square in front of the Trinity Cathedral between Bolshaya Zelenovskaya, Fevralskaya and Revolyutsionny Prospekt streets. It is a tall four-sided pyramid crowned with the Alexander Eagle. The rectangular pedestal is framed by eight pyramidal pedestals connected by a massive chain. There is a plaque on the monument: "September 22, 1812. Russian Russians under the command of General Miloradovich, fighting all day between S. Voronov and Tarutin with Murat's corps, blocked the French way to the camp of the Russian army led by Kutuzov." During the Soviet era, it was converted into a monument to Karl Marx, but in 1995 it was restored.
- Monument to Viktor Vasilyevich Talalikhin. The sculptor is Z. I. Azgur, the architect is L. P. Zemskov. It was opened on May 9, 1960 with funds earned by Komsomol members. It is located in the Central City Park named after V. V. Talalikhin. The monument is a bust of the hero on a granite pedestal. On the pedestal there is an inscription "To Victor Talilikhin" and a metal plaque with his biography and a description of the feat. Monument to Mikhail Illarionovich Kutuzov. The sculptor is Udalova S. M., the architects are Lyubarskaya O. G., Kudrina S. V. It was opened in 1995. In 2012, in honor of the 200th anniversary of the Patriotic War of 1812, the monument was renovated: the foundation of the stele was redone, portraits of Russian commanders who participated in the events of 1812 were added to the composition. It is located in the Kutuzovo microdistrict at the intersection of Sosnovaya and Borodinskaya streets. It is a 22-meter-high composition, on top of which is a stainless steel sculpture of Archangel Michael.
- Monument to Catherine II. The sculptor is A. A. Rozhnikov, the architect is M. V. Tikhomirov. It was opened on September 14, 2008. It is located in Catherine Square near the Railway Station Square. The monument depicts the Empress at the time of signing the Decree of October 5, 1781, which reads: "... we most graciously command that the city be renamed the economic village of Podol»
- Monument to Alexander Sergeyevich Pushkin. Author: Victor Mikhailovich Mikhailov. It was opened on June 6, 1999 and was installed to mark the 200th anniversary of the poet's birth. It is located in the park to the right of the Podolsk Administration building (other places for installation were also proposed: the Ivanovskoye estate, the square in front of the Lepse Recreation Center, the square square near the old city committee). The monument is a bust of the poet made of red-brown granite, which stands on a column of black granite. The poet's hands are positioned close to Kiprensky's portrait, with his right hand resting on his shoulder and his left hand on his bust. There is an inscription on the pedestal: "My friend, let us dedicate our beautiful impulses to the motherland".
- The bronze sculpture "Justice". The author is D. V. Kukkolos. It was installed on December 23, 2005 on the territory of the new Podolsk City Court building. The Podolsk goddess of justice has classic attributes (scales, a sword, a blindfold), and also holds in her right hand a shield with the image of the coat of arms of Russia.
- Bust of Alexander Vasilyevich Nikulin, Honorary Citizen of the Moscow Region, Honorary Citizen of the city of Podolsk, the first popularly elected Head of the city of Podolsk (1992–2003). It was installed on October 6, 2012 in the park located at 34/29 Revolutsionny Prospekt. The sculptor is A. Pliev, the architect is M. Korolev.
- Monument to Alexei Arsentievich Dolgoy, Hero of Socialist Labor, General Director of the S. Ordzhonikidze Podolsk Machine—Building Plant (1960–1974). He initiated the creation of vocational school No. 27, the first indoor swimming pool in the city. With his active participation, a monument to Podolsk cadets was erected in Podolsk and the palace in the Ivanovskoye estate was restored. The monument was erected on October 6, 2012 in the park located at 7 Parkovaya St.
- Monument to Leo Nikolaevich Tolstoy, who passed through Podolsk to Yasnaya Polyana three times. It was installed on October 6, 2013 on Kirov Street in front of the Sberbank of Russia and Promsberbank buildings (later the monument's installation site was named Leo Tolstoy Boulevard). It was erected on the 185th anniversary of the writer. There is an inscription on the pedestal: "A person is like a fraction, the numerator is what he is, and the denominator is what he thinks of himself. The larger the denominator, the smaller the fraction." The sculptor is A. A. Rozhnikov.
- Sculptural composition of the saints, Orthodox patrons of the family "Peter and Fevronia". It was installed in the square of the Newlyweds opposite the city registry office in the fall of 2013 — on the eve of the 232nd anniversary of Podolsk. The sculptor is S. V. Rezepov, who donated the composition to the city.
- Sculpture composition "Goldfish". It was installed on the Khudozhestvenskaya Embankment in the fall of 2013, on the eve of the 232nd anniversary of Podolsk. The sculptor is S. V. Rezepov, who donated the composition to the city.
- The monument to Podolsk residents, liquidators of man—made disasters, was erected on September 3, 2004. The author of the sculpture is Viktor Mikhailov.
- The monument to Mikhail Lermontov on Silicate was opened on October 5, 2014 on the territory of school No. 33. The author is Sergey Rezepov. The sculpture is made in bronze.
- Monument to M. Y. Lermontov in the Central Park named after Talalikhina — Opened on September 12, 2015 on the territory of the Central Park named after Talalikhina. The author of the sculpture is Ivan Korzhev.
- Monument to Vasily Vasilyevich Stekolnikov— Hero of Socialist Labor, Director of OKB Gidropress. It was opened on December 21, 2016 in the park on Stekolnikov Street.
- Monument to Evgeny Yefimovich Karelov, film director and screenwriter. It was opened on November 5, 2016 on Leningradskaya Street. The sculptor is Alexander Rozhnikov.
- Monument to Vasily Polenov, a famous Russian artist. It was opened in October 2017 in Dubrava Park in Klimovsk microdistrict. The bronze sculptural composition, which represents the figure of the artist in front of a through-the-wall baguette frame on an easel in the company of a small cat and dog, was made by Honored Artist of the Russian Federation, sculptor Alexander Rozhnikov and architect Mikhail Tikhomirov.

=== Cultural institutions ===
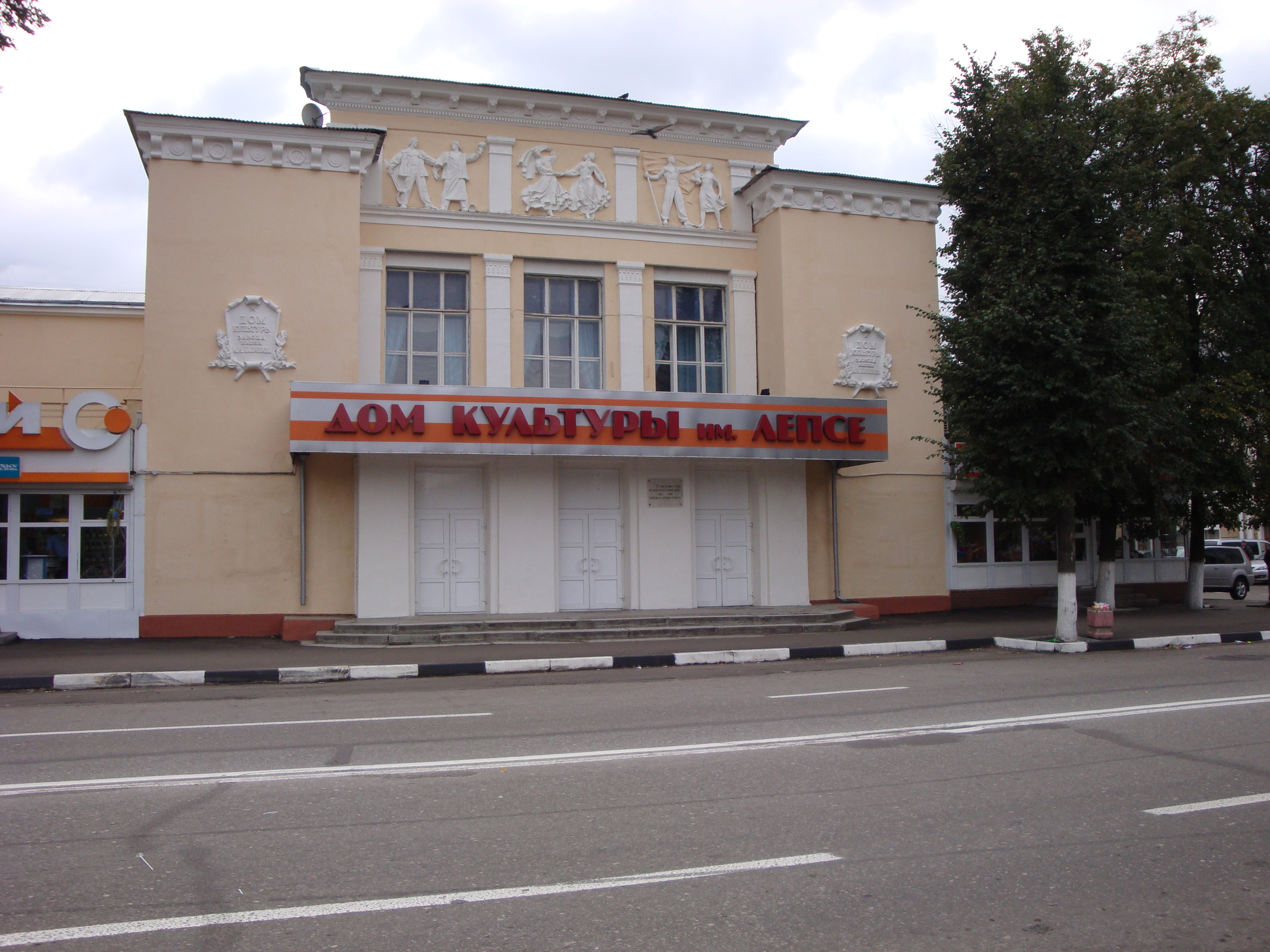
Recreation Center named after Lepse (originally the Kalinin Factory Club) in Podolsk

The city has a museum of local lore, the Podillya Historical and Memorial Reserve, the Museum of Vocational Education of Russia, an exhibition hall, and 9 cultural centers (the largest are the Recreation Center named after Lepse, Recreation center "October", Recreation Center named after Karl Marx), a cinema and concert hall in the city administration building.

The Podolsk Museum of Local Lore was opened on June 11, 1971. The exposition of the Museum of Local Lore, dedicated to the history of the city of Podolsk, is located in the former Main Building of the offices, which was part of the ensemble of administrative buildings. This ensemble is the only thing that has been preserved in Podolsk from the era of Emperor Nicholas I. The offices, designated on the city plan for 1849 as the "prison castle", occupied the territory in the form of a rectangle. The main two-storey building (Sovetskaya Square, 7) faced the Main Square of the city.

The exhibition area is 150 m2, the average number of visitors per year is 35.5 thousand people. The museum also has an archive, a scientific library and an expert group. In December 2017, a Tourist Information Center (TIC) was established on the basis of the Museum of Local Lore, where you can get information about excursions, city festivals and holidays, and the work of cultural institutions.

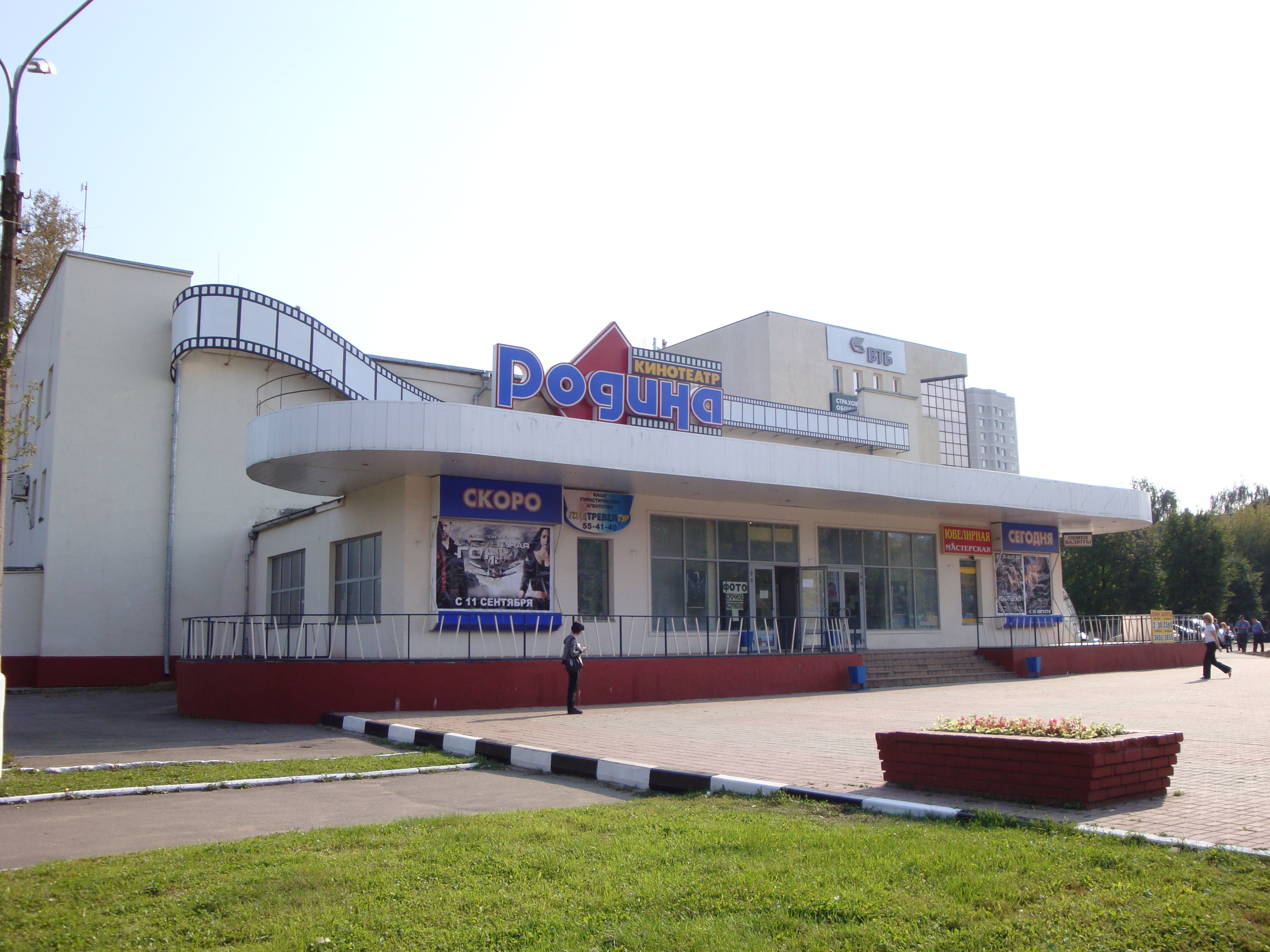
Rodina Cinema, closed in 2012

Of particular interest is the Historical and Memorial Museum-Reserve "Podillya", opened on November 7, 1937 and located in the house of teacher V. P. Kedrova, where Lenin's relatives lived in 1900. The museum is based on the Lenin House Museum, in addition, the permanent exhibition is also devoted to the history, culture and everyday life of Podolsk of the XIX-XX centuries. The exposition and exhibition area is 300 m2, the park area is 13.1 hectares, and the average number of visitors per year is 1,700 people. The museum has a scientific library which is part of an extensive library system, which includes 16 libraries. The most important of them are the central city Library, located on Sverdlov Street and has 13 branches, and the Central City Children's Library, located on Revolyutsionny Prospekt. In recent years, major repairs have been carried out in many of them, computerized workstations for readers have been organized, and a local network is being created to organize a single information space. In 2007, more than 40,000 readers used the services of municipal libraries, and the total library stock amounted to more than 500,000 copies of books. In 1886, the first Braille book in Russian was published in Podolsk.

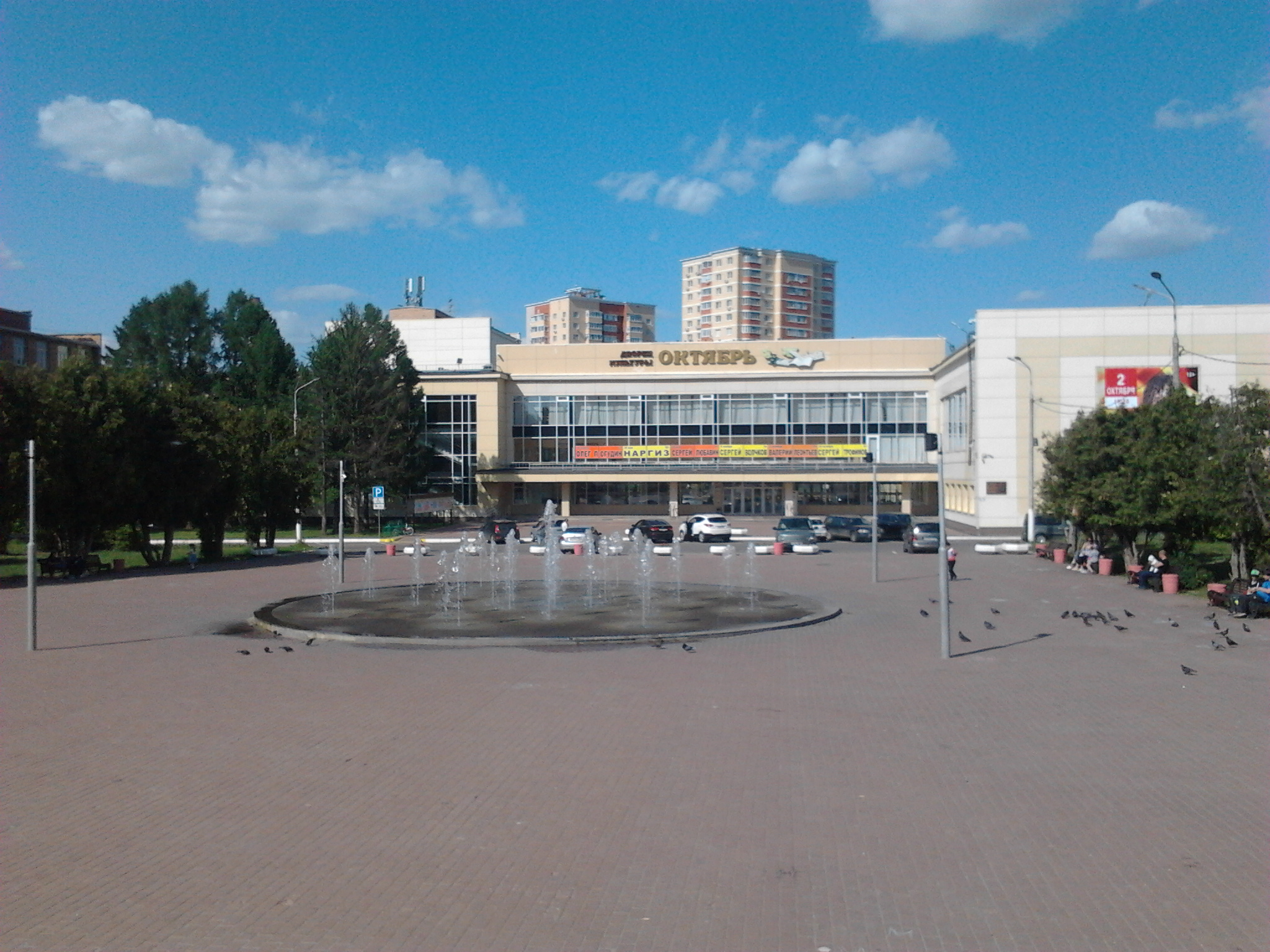
October Palace of Culture

Since June 27, 1977, the Podolsk Exhibition Hall has been operating in the city, which simultaneously houses at least four expositions. The permanent exhibition is dedicated to the Great Patriotic War. The exposition and exhibition area is 1,100 m2, the average number of visitors per year is 22,667 people. A social and cultural center with a city art gallery is located on the territory of the former fruit water factory. The largest cultural institution in Podolsk is the October Palace of Culture, built in 1975. The decision to build it was made by the leadership of the Podolsk Electromechanical Plant back in the 1960s, as the former workers' club did not have sufficient space to accommodate all amateur art groups. In 1998, the Recreation center became a municipal cultural institution. Currently, there is a theater and concert hall for 850 people in October, a large sports hall, a dance hall, a choreography class, concerts, performances, and celebrations are regularly held. The creative team includes the folklore ensemble Istoki, the folk dance ensemble Pulse of Time, the musical studio Rainbow, the ballet studio of the Children's Theater Center Blue Bird and others. Meetings of the 50mm city photo club are regularly held.

In 2008, the Podolsk Drama Theater was established on the basis of leading theater groups. There are also cinemas in the city.: Karo Film, which became the first multiplex cinema in the Moscow region in 2003 and a multiplex cinema Silver Cinema.

The Central Archive of the Ministry of Defense of the Russian Federation is located in Podolsk.

=== Podolsk in philately ===
During the time of the Russian Empire, a zemstvo post office operated on the territory of Podolsk County, which issued 11 types of postage stamps from 1871 to 1895. The pattern of all the stamps was similar and contained an image of crisscrossing picks, the main element of the historical coat of arms of the county town.

In the Soviet Union and modern Russia, not a single special postage stamp dedicated to this city was issued.

However, in 1970, a commemorative series of ten stamps and one postal block "100th anniversary of the birth of V. I. Lenin" was published, the authors of which were the artists I. Martynov and N. Cherkasov (CFA [Stamp JSC] No. 3879-3889). The entire edition of the ten-stamp series was published in small sheets of eight identical stamps, framed with laurel leaves, and 16 coupons depicting memorable places associated with Lenin's life and work.

On one of the stamp sheets (CFA [Marka JSC] No. 3880) there is a coupon with an image of a house in Podolsk (later the Lenin House Museum), where the Ulyanov family lived and where Lenin stayed in 1900.

The USSR Ministry of Communications also issued five art-marked envelopes with Podolsk subjects, and the Lenin House Museum was represented on three of them.:

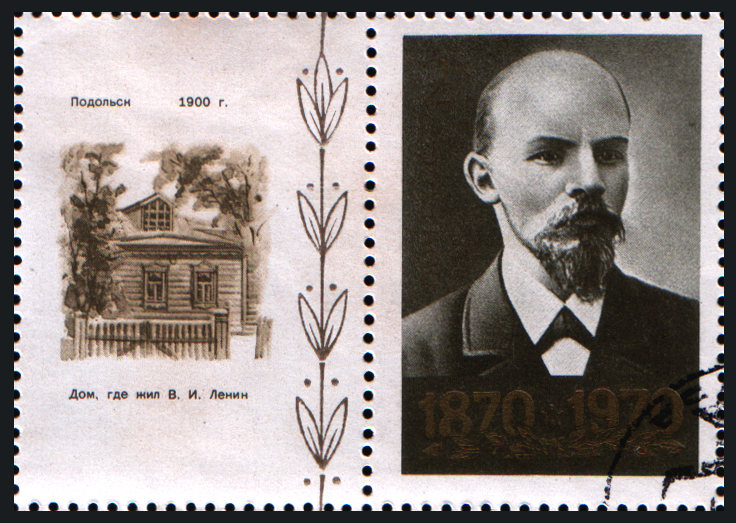
A 1970 USSR stamp with a portrait of a young Lenin and a coupon depicting the house in Podolsk where Lenin lived in 1900

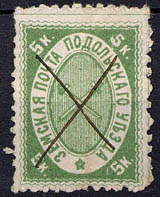
Podolsk Zemstvo stamp, 1878, 5 kopecks, pen cancelled.

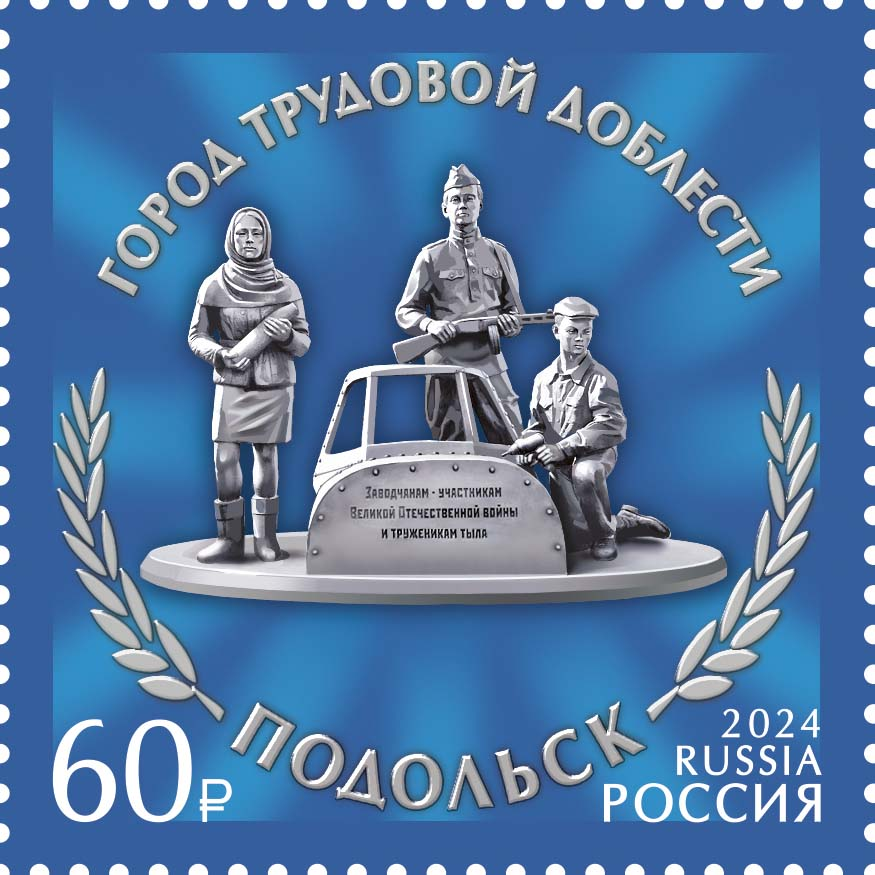
Monument to factory workers who participated in the Great Patriotic War and home front workers

== Sport ==
Sports facilities are located in the city — the Vityaz Ice Sports Palace, the Trud Stadium, the Sport-Service palace, the sports clubs Oktyabr and Cosmos. Equestrian complexes "Favorit" and "Prestige".

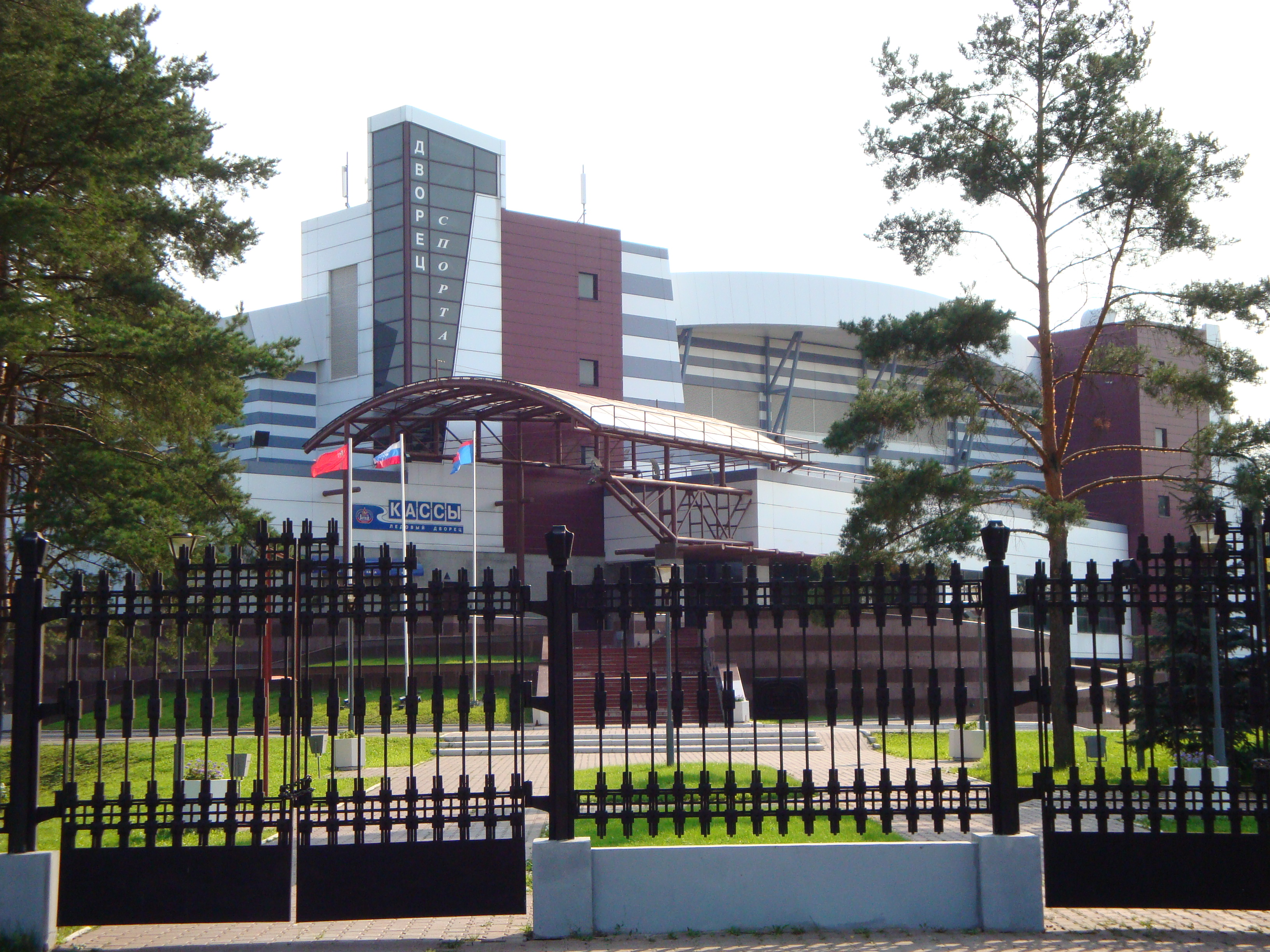
Vityaz Ice Sports Palace

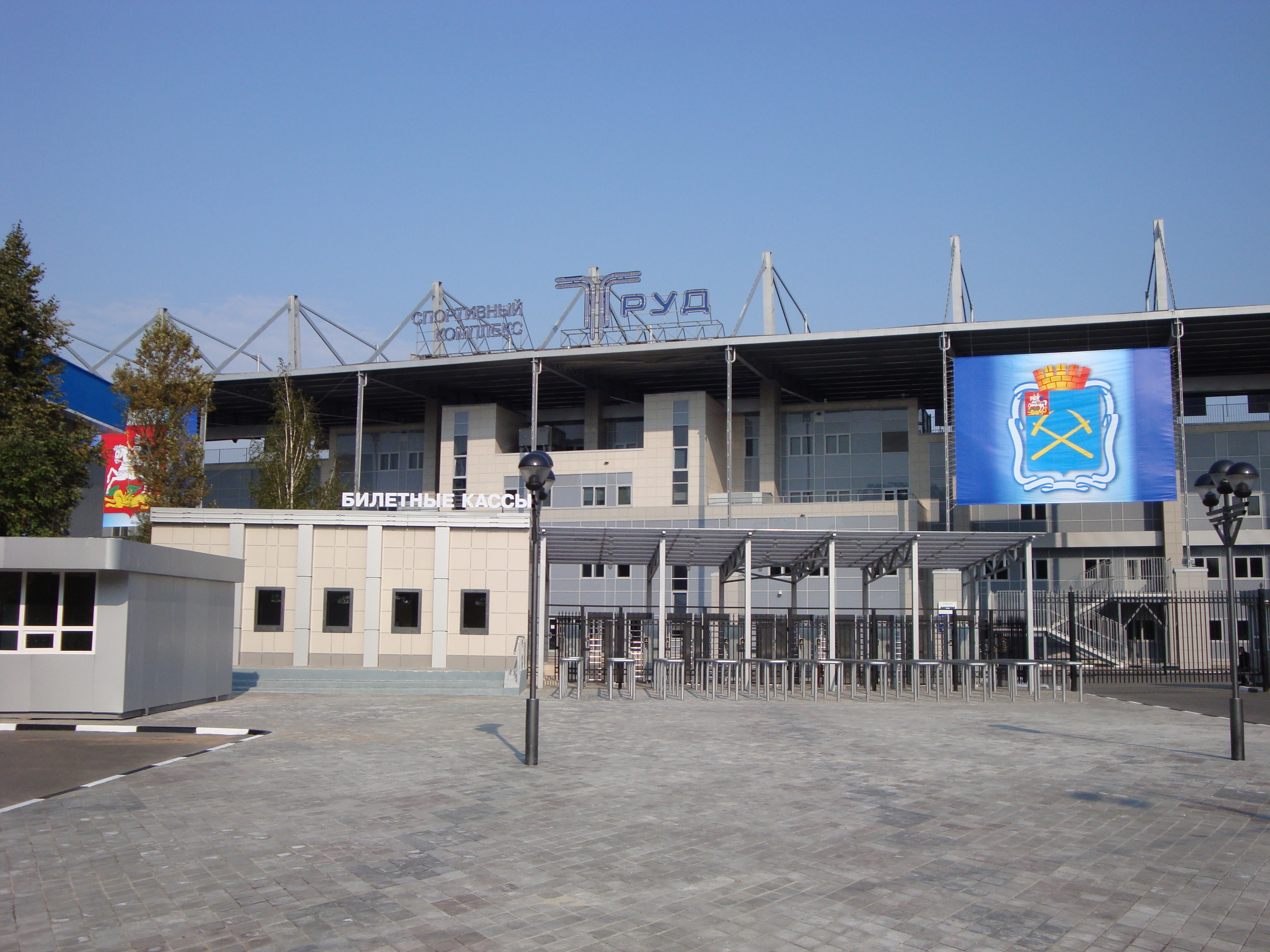
Trud Stadium in Podolsk (Moscow region)

The most famous sports grandstand in the city is the Vityaz Ice Palace, built in 2000 and designed for 5,500 people. The main building of the complex includes an arena with artificial ice, a restaurant, a cafe-bar for journalists, and 5 fast-service cafes. An indoor tennis court is adjacent to the main building. In addition to sports events, the complex hosts various concerts, mass events, and filming of TV shows. For this purpose, the ice rink will be transformed into a concert stage and orchestra seats (the capacity of the stalls and stands is 6800 people). Initially, the Vityaz Ice Palace was the home arena for the hockey team of the same name competing in the Russian championship. However, in 2003 she moved to the city of Chekhov. From 2008 to 2009, the Ice Palace was the home arena of the Lynx hockey Club, founded in 2008 and playing in the Major League. From December 9 to December 11, 2011, the first international sledge hockey tournament in the history of the Russian Paralympic movement was held at the training center of the Ice Palace. Before the start of the 2013/2014 season, the Ice Palace once again became the home arena of the Vityaz hockey club.

On September 13, 2008, after reconstruction, the Trud Stadium was opened, which is a two-tribune complex for 13,000 spectators with a football field and running tracks. The old stadium, with a capacity of 22,500 spectators, was the largest in the Moscow region. In addition, it was the only one in the Moscow region where the Olympic Flame of 1980 "spent the night": in the summer of that year, the torch relay was held in the city. The city has long preserved the rarest old Soviet lampposts-floor lamps with Olympic rings. The latter were dismantled in the 2000s during the reconstruction of the Alley of Rescuers and the park on Stekolnikov St. There are six gyms located under the two stands of the new stadium. Under the eastern one — for martial arts, choreography and general physical training. There is a game room, a shaping room and a cardio room under the west stand. A hotel with 84 seats is also located under one of the stands. Trud Stadium is the home arena for Vityaz Football Club, which competes in the Russian Amateur Championship (the club also competed in the First and Second Divisions). Podolsk was also represented in the LFL and the Second Division by the Avangard football club.

In addition to the Trud Stadium, the city also has smaller Zenit and Planeta stadiums. Zenit Stadium, which has been in existence since the 1930s, is located in the Park district and is the oldest stadium in Podolsk and one of the oldest stadiums in the Moscow region. In the late 1950s and early 1960s, it hosted matches of the USSR football championship with the participation of the Moscow teams Torpedo and Spartak. Currently, the new stadium field, opened in 2006, hosts football classes at the Vityaz Youth Sports School, as well as football matches of the championships and championships of the city of Podolsk. The capacity of the stands is 250 seats. The Planet Stadium has been in existence since 1947 and was previously the factory stadium of the Plant. Orzhonikidze. It has two all—season, heated fields with artificial turf (one of them is full—size, the other is for mini-football) The number of spectator seats in the stands is 3050.

In 2007, a tennis academy was opened to train athletes for lawn tennis. The Academy is located next to the Vityaz Ice Palace and includes 4 indoor and 5 outdoor courts, a gym and a hotel complex. In October 2007, the Academy hosted the Moscow Region Governor's Cup in Tennis.

Modern bases have been built in the city to train the Russian ski team. Athletes are being trained in table tennis, boxing, judo, Greco-Roman wrestling, hockey, and volleyball.

== Twin towns – sister cities ==
Podolsk is twinned with:

- Amstetten, Austria
- Bălți, Moldova
- Bar, Montenegro
- Barysaw, Belarus
- Kladno, Czech Republic
- Hengyang, China
- Kavarna, Bulgaria
- (Georgia (country)) Marneuli, Georgia
- Ohrid, North Macedonia
- Saint-Ouen-sur-Seine, France
- Shumen, Bulgaria
- Trier-Saarburg, Germany
- Vanadzor, Armenia
- Warmian-Masurian Voivodeship, Poland

== Notable people ==
- Andrey Balanov (born 1976), amateur boxer
- Arkady Boytsov (1923–2000), pilot
- Maxim Eprev (born 1988), professional ice hockey player
- Anatoli Izmailov (1978–2011), professional footballer
- Lev Korolyov (1926–2016), computer scientist
- Viktor Kruglov (born 1955), football player
- Eugenie Leontovich (1900–1993), actress
- Sergey Makarov (born 1973), track and field athlete
- Nikolai Potapov (born 1990), professional boxer
- Roman Safiullin (born 1997), professional tennis player
- Darya Sagalova (born 1985), film and stage actress, choreographer
- Andrey Smolyakov (born 1958), actor

== Sources ==
- Московская областная Дума. Закон №11/2013-ОЗ от 31 января 2013 г. «Об административно-территориальном устройстве Московской области», в ред. Закона №249/2019-ОЗ от 29 ноября 2019 г. «О внесении изменений в Закон Московской области "Об административно-территориальном устройстве Московской области"». Вступил в силу на следующий день после официального опубликования (13 января 2013 г.). Опубликован: "Ежедневные Новости. Подмосковье", №24, 12 февраля 2013 г. (Moscow Oblast Duma. Law #11/2013-OZ of January 31, 2013 On the Administrative-Territorial Structure of Moscow Oblast, as amended by the Law #249/2019-OZ of November 29, 2019 On amending the Law of Moscow Oblast "On the Administrative-Territorial Structure of Moscow Oblast". Effective as of the day following the day of the official publication (January 13, 2013).).
- Московская областная Дума. Закон №81/2015-ОЗ от 22 мая 2015 г. «О преобразовании городского округа Подольск, городского округа Климовск, городского поселения Львовский Подольского муниципального района, сельского поселения Дубровицкое Подольского муниципального района, сельского поселения Лаговского Подольского муниципального района и сельского поселения Стрелковское Подольского муниципального района, о статусе и установлении границы вновь образованного муниципального образования». Вступил в силу через 10 дней после официального опубликования, за исключением статьи 4, вступающей в силу через один месяц после вступления в силу Закона в случае отсутствия инициативы жителей городского округа Подольск о проведении местного референдума по вопросу определения структуры органов местного самоуправления городского округа Подольск. Опубликован: "Ежедневные Новости. Подмосковье", №94, 28 мая 2015 г. (Moscow Oblast Duma. Law #81/2015-OZ of May 22, 2015 On the Transformation of the Urban Okrug of Podolsk, Urban Okrug of Klimovsk, Urban Settlement of Lvovsky in Podolsky Municipal District, Rural Settlement of Dubrovitskoye in Podolsky Municipal District, Rural Settlement of Lagovskoye in Podolsky Municipal District, and Rural Settlement of Strelkovskoye in Podolsky Municipal District, on the Status and Establishing the Borders of the Newly Established Municipal Formation. Effective as of the day which is 10 days after the official publication, with the exception of Article 4, which takes effect one month after the Law taking effect if there is no initiative on the part of the residents of the Urban Okrug of Podolsk to conduct a referendum on establishing the structure of the bodies of the local self-government of the Urban Okrug of Podolsk.).
- Московская областная Дума. Закон №65/2005-ОЗ от 28 февраля 2005 г. «О статусе и границах Подольского муниципального района и вновь образованных в его составе муниципальных образований», в ред. Закона №155/2012-ОЗ от 22 октября 2012 г. «О внесении изменений в Закон Московской области "О статусе и границах Подольского муниципального района и вновь образованных в его составе муниципальных образований"». Вступил в силу со дня официального опубликования. Опубликован: "Ежедневные Новости. Подмосковье", №42, 10 марта 2005 г. (Moscow Oblast Duma. Law #65/2005-OZ of February 28, 2005 On the Status and the Borders of Podolsky Municipal District and the Newly Established Municipal Formations Comprising It, as amended by the Law #155/2012-OZ of October 22, 2012 On Amending the Law of Moscow Oblast "On the Status and the Borders of Podolsky Municipal District and the Newly Established Municipal Formations Comprising It". Effective as of the day of the official publication.).
