= Podolsk constituency =

Legislative constituency in Russia

Podolsk single-member constituency
- Constituency of the Russian State Duma
- Deputy: Vyacheslav Fetisov; United Russia
- Federal subject: Moscow Oblast
- Districts: Domodedovo, Lytkarino, Podolsk, Ramenskoye (Chulkovskoye, Ganusovskoye, Konstantinovskoye, Ostrovetskoye, Sofyinskoye), Zhukovsky
- Voters: 544,673 (2026)

The Podolsk constituency (No.126 (Note: No.113 in 1993-1995 and 2003-2007, No.112 in 1995-2003, No.124 in 2016–2026)) is a Russian legislative constituency in Moscow Oblast. The constituency covers inner southern suburbs of Moscow, including the cities Domodedovo, Lytkarino, Podolsk and Zhukovsky.

The constituency has been represented since 2016 by United Russia deputy Vyacheslav Fetisov, former Senator from Primorsky Krai, 1984 and 1988 Olympic champion ice hockey player.

== Boundaries ==
1993–1995: Chekhov, Chekhovsky District, Klimovsk, Podolsk, Podolsky District, Protvino, Pushchino, Serpukhov, Serpukhovsky District, Shcherbinka, Troitsk
The constituency covered southern suburbs of Moscow and southern Moscow Oblast, including the cities Chekhov, Klimovsk, Podolsk, Protvino, Pushchino, Serpukhov, Shcherbinka and Troitsk.

1995–2007: Klimovsk, Molodyozhny, Naro-Fominsky District, Podolsk, Podolsky District, Shcherbinka, Troitsk
The constituency was significantly altered following the 1995 redistricting, losing southern cities of Chekhov, Protvino, Pushchino and Serpukhov to new Serpukhov constituency. This seat was pushed to the west to grab Naro-Fominsky District from Istra constituency.

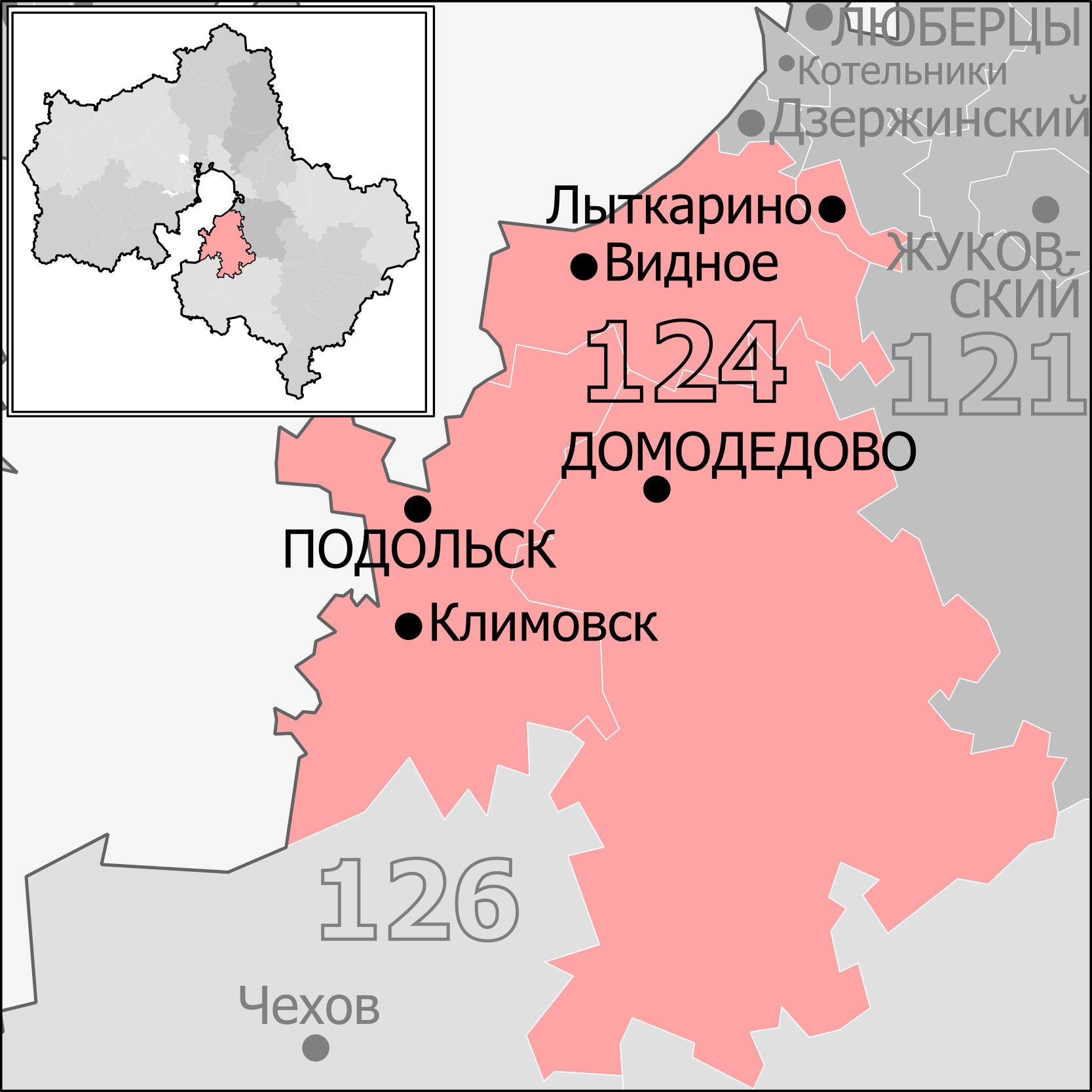
Constituency boundaries from 2016 to 2026

2016–2026: Domodedovo, Lytkarino, Podolsk, Vidnoye
The constituency was re-created for the 2016 election and retained only Podolsk and its surroundings, while western portions of former Podolsky District, eastern half of Naro-Fominsky District, Shcherbinka and Troitsk were absorbed by Moscow in 2012 as part of New Moscow and placed into New Moscow constituency; the rest of former Naro-Fominsky District was placed into Odintsovo constituency. This seat was pushed northwards to grab inner Moscow suburbs of Lytkarino and Vidnoye from Odintsovo constituency, and westwards to Domodedovo from Serpukhov constituency.

2026–present: Domodedovo, Lytkarino, Podolsk, Ramenskoye (Chulkovskoye, Ganusovskoye, Konstantinovskoye, Ostrovetskoye, Sofyinskoye), Zhukovsky
After the 2025 redistricting the constituency was significantly changed, swapping Vidnoye with western Ramenskoye and Zhukovsky from Lyubertsy constituency.

== Members elected ==
Election	Member	Party
1993	Grigory Bondarev	Yavlinsky–Boldyrev–Lukin
1995	Yury Voronin	Communist Party
1999	Maksim Vasilyev	Fatherland – All Russia
2003	Sergey Glazyev	Rodina
2007	Proportional representation - no election by constituency	
2011	Proportional representation - no election by constituency	
2016	Vyacheslav Fetisov	United Russia
2021	Vyacheslav Fetisov	United Russia
2026	Vyacheslav Fetisov	United Russia

== Election results ==
=== 1993 ===
Summary of the 12 December 1993 Russian legislative election in the Podolsk constituency
Candidate	Party	Votes	%
Grigory Bondarev	Yavlinsky–Boldyrev–Lukin	31,681	9.79%
Georgy Tikhonov	Civic Union	28,386	8.77%
Natalya Bobkova	Russian Democratic Reform Movement	27,680	8.55%
Boris Anikin	Independent	27,132	8.38%
Aleksey Umansky	Independent	25,417	7.85%
Anatoly Shabad	Choice of Russia	24,817	7.67%
Yury Ilyin	Independent	22,000	6.80%
Vladimir Yunkevich	Independent	11,129	3.44%
against all		73,627	22.75%
Total		323,675	100%

=== 1995 ===
Summary of the 17 December 1995 Russian legislative election in the Podolsk constituency
Candidate	Party	Votes	%
Yury Voronin	Communist Party	45,588	15.98%
Grigory Bondarev (incumbent)	Yabloko	29,028	10.18%
Igor Kuznetsov	Independent	23,308	8.17%
Aleksey Averochkin	Independent	18,993	6.66%
Ivan Fedik	Our Home – Russia	16,638	5.83%
Lyudmila Krasnenkova	Independent	16,625	5.83%
Anatoly Shabad	Democratic Choice of Russia – United Democrats	16,539	5.80%
Tatyana Lebedeva	Congress of Russian Communities	11,418	4.00%
Igor Klochkov	Agrarian Party	11,274	3.95%
Gennady Fyodorov	Party of Workers' Self-Government	11,087	3.89%
Vladimir Shcheglov	Liberal Democratic Party	8,576	3.01%
Yury Levykin	Independent	8,186	2.87%
Leonid Zhuravlev	Communists and Working Russia - for the Soviet Union	7,896	2.77%
Vladimir Menshov	Trade Unions and Industrialists – Union of Labour	7,494	2.63%
Lyudmila Chemeris	Independent	4,003	1.40%
Viktor Morozov	Union of Patriots	3,893	1.37%
Vladimir Melikhov	Independent	3,323	1.17%
against all		31,836	11.16%
Total		285,194	100%

=== 1999 ===
Summary of the 19 December 1999 Russian legislative election in the Podolsk constituency
Candidate	Party	Votes	%
Maksim Vasilyev	Fatherland – All Russia	57,707	20.83%
Yury Voronin (incumbent)	Communist Party	50,357	18.18%
Grigory Bondarev	Yabloko	33,822	12.21%
Vladimir Smolensky	Independent	21,244	7.67%
Oleg Baklanov	Independent	15,667	5.66%
Aleksandr Lukashov	Party of Pensioners	14,698	5.31%
Igor Klyuyev	Liberal Democratic Party	7,190	2.60%
Valery Savin	Independent	6,872	2.48%
Yury Levykin	Congress of Russian Communities-Yury Boldyrev Movement	5,337	1.93%
Nikolay Yumanov	Russian Socialist Party	3,189	1.15%
Yevgeny Borkov	Spiritual Heritage	2,360	0.85%
Gennady Mironov	Independent	2,111	0.76%
against all		48,950	17.67%
Total		277,003	100%

=== 2003 ===
Summary of the 7 December 2003 Russian legislative election in the Podolsk constituency
Candidate	Party	Votes	%
Sergey Glazyev	Rodina	133,215	55.43%
Aleksandr Byalko	Union of Right Forces	19,584	7.85%
Grigory Bondarev	Yabloko	13,061	5.24%
Sergey Zhilkin	Russian Pensioners' Party-Party of Social Justice	7,623	3.06%
Yury Spirin	Liberal Democratic Party	7,043	2.82%
Yury Baslakovsky	Independent	3,685	1.48%
Aleksandr Adamovich	Party of Russia's Rebirth-Russian Party of Life	3,666	1.47%
Valery Burkov	United Russian Party Rus'	2,932	1.18%
Kirill Pakhomov	Development of Enterprise	1,990	0.80%
against all		48,080	19.28%
Total		249,794	100%

=== 2016 ===
Summary of the 18 September 2016 Russian legislative election in the Podolsk constituency
Candidate	Party	Votes	%
Vyacheslav Fetisov	United Russia	98,175	52.86%
Irina Tyutkova	Communist Party	22,049	11.87%
Fuad Sultanov	Liberal Democratic Party	13,342	7.18%
Sergey Kudinov	A Just Russia	12,616	6.79%
Sergey Korolev	Rodina	10,972	5.91%
Aleksandr Gunko	Yabloko	10,217	5.50%
Boris Dvoynikov	Communists of Russia	7,411	3.99%
Andrey Podmoskovny	Patriots of Russia	2,421	1.30%
Total		185,710	100%

=== 2021 ===
Summary of the 17-19 September 2021 Russian legislative election in the Podolsk constituency
Candidate	Party	Votes	%
Vyacheslav Fetisov (incumbent)	United Russia	94,658	43.11%
Boris Ivanyuzhenkov	Communist Party	47,273	21.53%
Oleg Bondarenko	A Just Russia — For Truth	15,471	7.05%
German Bogatyrenko	Liberal Democratic Party	10,048	4.58%
Roman Kharlanov	New People	9,267	4.22%
Pavel Semyonov	Party of Pensioners	8,076	3.68%
Denis Penkin	Communists of Russia	6,454	2.94%
Irina Drozdova	Yabloko	6,091	2.77%
Tatyana Filippova	The Greens	5,205	2.37%
Stanislav Abramov	Rodina	3,926	1.79%
Maya Moreva	Party of Growth	3,176	1.45%
Total		219,579	100%

=== 2026 ===
Summary of the 18-20 September 2026 Russian legislative election in the Podolsk constituency
Candidate	Party	Votes	%
Vyacheslav Fetisov (incumbent)	United Russia	143,010	53.41%
Boris Ivanyuzhenkov	Communist Party	46,655	17.43%
Yury Soldatov	New People	25,015	9.34%
Andrey Gerasimov	Liberal Democratic Party	22,625	8.45%
Anton Kharitonov	A Just Russia	12,632	4.72%
Aleksey Filippov	Yabloko	6,201	2.32%
Yelena Kotsyubinskaya	The Greens	4,563	1.70%
Igor Kozlov	Party of Pensioners	4,378	1.64%
Total		267,742	100%
