= Lyubertsy constituency =

Legislative constituency in Russia

Lyubertsy single-member constituency
- Constituency of the Russian State Duma
- Deputy: Roman Teryushkov; United Russia
- Federal subject: Moscow Oblast
- Districts: Kotelniki, Leninsky, Lyubertsy
- Voters: 541,180 (2026)

The Lyubertsy constituency (No.122 (Note: No.108 in 1993-1995 and 2003-2007, No.107 in 1995-2003, No.121 in 2016–2026)) is a Russian legislative constituency in Moscow Oblast. The constituency covers inner southern and south-eastern suburbs of Moscow, including Kotelniki and Lyubertsy.

The constituency has been represented since 2021 by United Russia deputy Roman Teryushkov, former Minister of Physical Culture and Sport of Moscow Oblast, who won the open seat, succeeding one-term United Russia incumbent Lidia Antonova.

== Boundaries ==
1993–1995: Bronnitsy, Lytkarino, Lyuberetsky District, Lyubertsy, Ramenskoye, Ramensky District, Zhukovsky
The constituency covered south-eastern suburbs of Moscow, including Bronnitsy, Lytkarino, Lyubertsy, Ramenskoye and Zhukovsky.

1995–2007: Bronnitsy, Dzerzhinsky, Kotelniki, Lyuberetsky District, Ramensky District, Zhukovsky
The constituency was slightly altered following the 1995 redistricting, only losing Lytkarino to Odintsovo constituency.

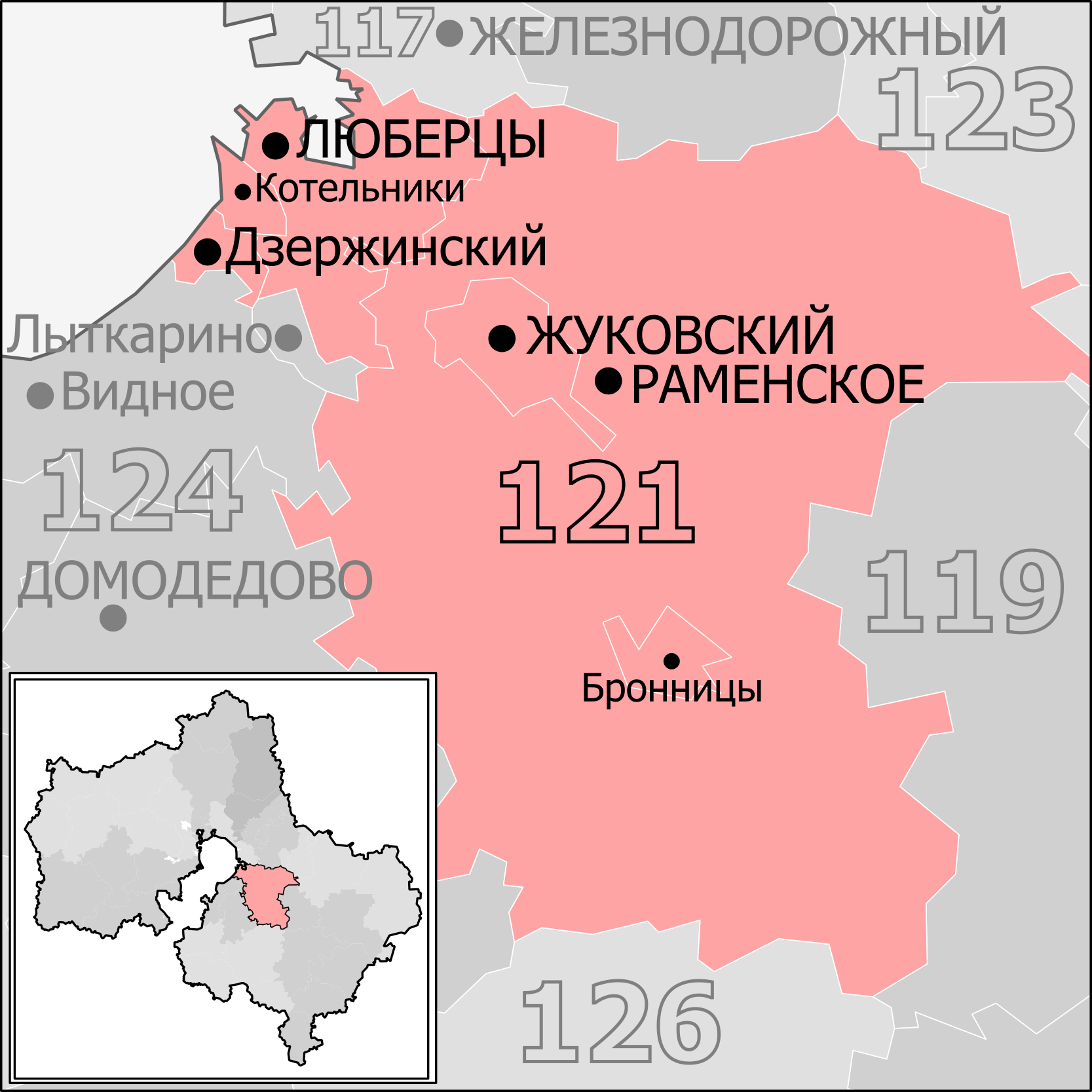
Constituency boundaries from 2016 to 2026

2016–2026: Bronnitsy, Dzerzhinsky, Kotelniki, Lyuberetsky District, Ramensky District, Zhukovsky
The constituency was re-created for the 2016 election and retained all of its former territory.

2026–present: Kotelniki, Leninsky District, Lyubertsy
After the 2025 redistricting the constituency was significantly changed, losing its outer territories Zhukovsky to Podolsk constituency, Bronnitsy – to Serpukhov constituency, while Ramensky District was divided between Podolsk, Serpukhov, Kolomna and Shchyolkovo constituencies. This seat was reconfigured to inner southern and south-eastern suburbs of Moscow, as the constituency gained Leninsky District from Podolsk constituency.

== Members elected ==
| Election | Member | Party |
|---|---|---|
| 1993 | Anatoly Guskov | Future of Russia–New Names |
| 1995 | Sergey Popov | Independent |
| 1999 | Yury Lipatov | Fatherland – All Russia |
| 2003 | Viktor Semyonov | United Russia |
| 2007 | Proportional representation - no election by constituency | |
| 2011 | Proportional representation - no election by constituency | |
| 2016 | Lidia Antonova | United Russia |
| 2021 | Roman Teryushkov | United Russia |
| 2026 | Roman Teryushkov | United Russia |

== Election results ==
=== 1993 ===
Summary of the 12 December 1993 Russian legislative election in the Lyubertsy constituency
| Candidate | Party | Votes | % |
|---|---|---|---|
| Anatoly Guskov | Future of Russia–New Names | 103,417 | 34.79% |
| Konstantin Lubenchenko | Civic Union | 30,089 | 10.12% |
| Aleksandr Yegorov | Independent | 23,091 | 7.77% |
| Valentin Mamontov | Independent | 23,022 | 7.75% |
| Yury Yeltsov | Independent | 19,284 | 6.49% |
| Akhmet Khalitov | Liberal Democratic Party | 15,973 | 5.37% |
| Nikolay Platoshkin | Independent | 13,419 | 4.51% |
| Vladimir Filin | Independent | 5,116 | 1.72% |
| Alexey Podberezkin | Independent | 4,739 | 1.59% |
| against all | | 41,169 | 13.85% |
| Total | | 297,223 | 100% |

=== 1995 ===
Summary of the 17 December 1995 Russian legislative election in the Lyubertsy constituency
| Candidate | Party | Votes | % |
|---|---|---|---|
| Sergey Popov | Independent | 54,028 | 16.97% |
| Anatoly Dolgolaptev | Trade Unions and Industrialists – Union of Labour | 46,959 | 14.75% |
| Ivan Yakushin | Communist Party | 44,320 | 13.92% |
| Anatoly Guskov (incumbent) | Independent | 40,841 | 12.83% |
| Yury Lyubashevsky | Yabloko | 21,191 | 6.66% |
| Pyotr Oleynik | Independent | 19,077 | 5.99% |
| Bela Denisenko | Forward, Russia! | 14,862 | 4.67% |
| Boris Volynov | Ivan Rybkin Bloc | 8,596 | 2.70% |
| Vladimir Filin | Congress of Russian Communities | 7,977 | 2.51% |
| Viktor Balakhovsky | Liberal Democratic Party | 7,623 | 2.39% |
| Andrey Klyuchnikov | Bloc '89 | 6,367 | 2.00% |
| Aleksey Vedenkin | Independent | 5,992 | 1.88% |
| Tatyana Udovenko | Independent | 3,835 | 1.20% |
| Lyudmila Kaziyeva | Faith, Work, Conscience | 1,362 | 0.43% |
| against all | | 27,145 | 8.52% |
| Total | | 318,422 | 100% |

=== 1999 ===
Summary of the 19 December 1999 Russian legislative election in the Lyubertsy constituency
| Candidate | Party | Votes | % |
|---|---|---|---|
| Yury Lipatov | Fatherland – All Russia | 55,013 | 17.85% |
| Aleksandr Sokolov | Communist Party | 44,517 | 14.44% |
| Vyacheslav Izmaylov | Yabloko | 31,233 | 10.13% |
| Igor Volk | Independent | 26,210 | 8.50% |
| Vladimir Lisichkin | Independent | 23,801 | 7.72% |
| Anatoly Shabad | Union of Right Forces | 16,304 | 5.29% |
| Anatoly Guskov | Movement in Support of the Army | 11,120 | 3.61% |
| Zinaida Antontseva | Russian All-People's Union | 9,374 | 3.04% |
| Sergey Bukhantsev | Independent | 8,755 | 2.84% |
| Vladislav Belov | Independent | 7,970 | 2.59% |
| Valery Skurlatov | Independent | 6,422 | 2.08% |
| Andrey Petukhov | Our Home – Russia | 4,303 | 1.40% |
| Aleksandr Voloshin | Independent | 1,984 | 0.64% |
| against all | | 53,977 | 17.51% |
| Total | | 308,261 | 100% |

=== 2003 ===
Summary of the 7 December 2003 Russian legislative election in the Lyubertsy constituency
| Candidate | Party | Votes | % |
|---|---|---|---|
| Viktor Semyonov | United Russia | 69,611 | 26.69% |
| Timur Artemyev | Independent | 59,535 | 22.83% |
| Aleksandr Garnayev | United Russian Party Rus' | 36,344 | 13.94% |
| Sergey Pustovitovsky | Independent | 10,752 | 4.12% |
| Yaroslav Nilov | Liberal Democratic Party | 8,013 | 3.07% |
| Viktor Gladkikh | Party of Russia's Rebirth-Russian Party of Life | 6,653 | 2.55% |
| against all | | 62,360 | 23.91% |
| Total | | 261,543 | 100% |

=== 2016 ===
Summary of the 18 September 2016 Russian legislative election in the Lyubertsy constituency
| Candidate | Party | Votes | % |
|---|---|---|---|
| Lidia Antonova | United Russia | 103,949 | 49.28% |
| Pavel Grudinin | Communist Party | 27,711 | 13.14% |
| Igor Chistyukhin | A Just Russia | 19,886 | 9.43% |
| Andrey Khromov | Liberal Democratic Party | 18,304 | 8.68% |
| Viktor Balabanov | Yabloko | 9,093 | 4.31% |
| Viktor Banov | Communists of Russia | 6,222 | 2.95% |
| Vladimir Laktyushin | Rodina | 5,766 | 2.73% |
| Lyudmila Tropina | Patriots of Russia | 5,336 | 2.53% |
| Oleg Solsky | Party of Growth | 3,686 | 1.75% |
| Vitaly Ozherelyev | The Greens | 3,196 | 1.52% |
| Total | | 210,941 | 100% |

=== 2021 ===
Summary of the 17-19 September 2021 Russian legislative election in the Lyubertsy constituency
| Candidate | Party | Votes | % |
|---|---|---|---|
| Roman Teryushkov | United Russia | 125,785 | 44.80% |
| Oleg Yemelyanov | Communist Party | 54,542 | 19.43% |
| Sergey Zhuravlev | A Just Russia — For Truth | 23,630 | 8.42% |
| Andrey Khromov | Liberal Democratic Party | 17,820 | 6.35% |
| Semyon Anosov | New People | 13,731 | 4.89% |
| Aleksandr Zaytsev | Party of Pensioners | 11,053 | 3.94% |
| Yulia Melnikova | The Greens | 8,077 | 2.88% |
| Viktor Balabanov | Yabloko | 6,314 | 2.25% |
| Vladimir Laktyushin | Rodina | 5,757 | 2.05% |
| Sergey Goremykin | Party of Growth | 3,919 | 1.40% |
| Total | | 280,747 | 100% |

=== 2026 ===
Summary of the 18-20 September 2026 Russian legislative election in the Lyubertsy constituency
| Candidate | Party | Votes | % |
|---|---|---|---|
| Roman Teryushkov (incumbent) | United Russia | 125,755 | 45.95% |
| Vasily Byzov | Communist Party | 44,650 | 16.32% |
| Andrey Khromov | Liberal Democratic Party | 36,320 | 13.27% |
| Roman Kharlanov | New People | 30,422 | 11.12% |
| Yevgenia Komarova | A Just Russia | 22,737 | 8.31% |
| Tatyana Sereda | The Greens | 6,838 | 2.50% |
| Yury Parkhomenko | Party of Pensioners | 5,509 | 2.01% |
| Total | | 273,655 | 100% |
