= Galitsky =

Galitsky (masculine, Russian: Галицкий) or Galitskaya (feminine, Russian: Галицкая) is a Russian surname. Notable people with the surname include:

- Alexander Galitsky (born 1955), Russian international technology entrepreneur
- Sasha Galitsky (born 1957), Russian and Israeli artist, writer, and art therapist
- Kuzma Galitsky (1897–1973), Soviet army general
- Sergey Galitsky (born 1967), Russian billionaire businessman
