= Sergei Lobanov =

Sergei Lobanov may refer to:

- Sergei Lobanov (footballer), Russia footballer
- Sergei Lobanov (chess player), Russian chess player
