= Eduard Gorovykh =

Russian chess grandmaster (born 1990)

- Gorovykh in 2009

Personal information
- Born: Eduard Igorevich Gorovykh; 7 February 1990 (age 36) Krasnodar, Russian SFSR, Soviet Union

Chess career
- Country: Russia
- Title: Grandmaster (2012)
- Peak rating: 2488 (January 2012)

Eduard Igorevich Gorovykh (Russian: Эдуард Игоревич Горовых; born 7 February 1990) is a Russian chess player who was awarded the title of Grandmaster (GM) by FIDE in 2012.

== Chess career ==
Gorovykh first exceeded a rating of 2300 in April 2005, qualifying for the FIDE Master title. Between January 2006 and February 2007, he earned the required tournament norms for the International Master title at various events in Russia, and FIDE awarded him the title in April 2007 after he reached the 2400 Elo mark.

He earned his first Grandmaster norm in 2007 by winning the Petrovskaya Ladya tournament in Peterhof. He achieved a second norm in early 2008 in Saint Petersburg and his final required norm in February 2010 at the Moscow Open.

Although Gorovykh steadily increased his rating, it remained below the required 2500 threshold after he completed his tournament norms. A Grandmaster title application submitted in May 2011 was conditionally approved pending his reaching the 2500 mark. He accomplished this during a series of tournaments in Vidnoye, where he achieved an interim rating above 2500. Even though his rating dropped back below the threshold after subsequent games, an interim rating over 2500 fulfills the requirement, and he was officially awarded the Grandmaster title in January 2012. Having played no rated games since then, he is listed as inactive by FIDE.
