= Serpukhov constituency =

Serpukhov single-member constituency
- Constituency of the Russian State Duma
- Deputy: Aleksandr Kogan; United Russia
- Federal subject: Moscow Oblast
- Districts: Bronnitsy, Chekhov, Ramenskoye (Bykovo, Ganusovskoye, Ilyinsky, Kratovo, Nikonovskoye, Ramenskoye, Rodniki, Safonovskoye, Sofyinskoye, Udelnaya, Ulyaninskoye, Vereyskoye, Vyalkovskoye, Zabolotyevskoye), Serpukhov, Stupino
- Voters: 546,110 (2026)

The Serpukhov constituency (No.128 (Note: No.114 in 1995-2003, No.115 in 2003-2007, No.126 in 2016–2026)) is a Russian legislative constituency in Moscow Oblast. The constituency stretches from south-eastern suburbs and exurbs of Moscow in Ramenskoye to southern Moscow Oblast, including the cities Chekhov, Serpukhov and Stupino.

The constituency has been represented since 2021 by United Russia deputy Aleksandr Kogan, four-term Member of State Duma and former Minister of Ecology and Natural Resources of Moscow Oblast, who won the open seat, succeeding one-term United Russia incumbent Yury Oleynikov.

== Boundaries ==
1995–2007: Chekhovsky District, Domodedovsky District, Prioksk (Note: Merged into Stupinsky District in 2004.), Protvino, Pushchino, Serpukhov, Serpukhovsky District, Stupinsky District
The constituency was created in 1995 from parts of Podolsk, Kolomna and Odintsovo constituencies. The constituency covered southern Moscow Oblast, including the cities Chekhov, Domodedovo, Protvino, Pushchino, Serpukhov and Stupino.

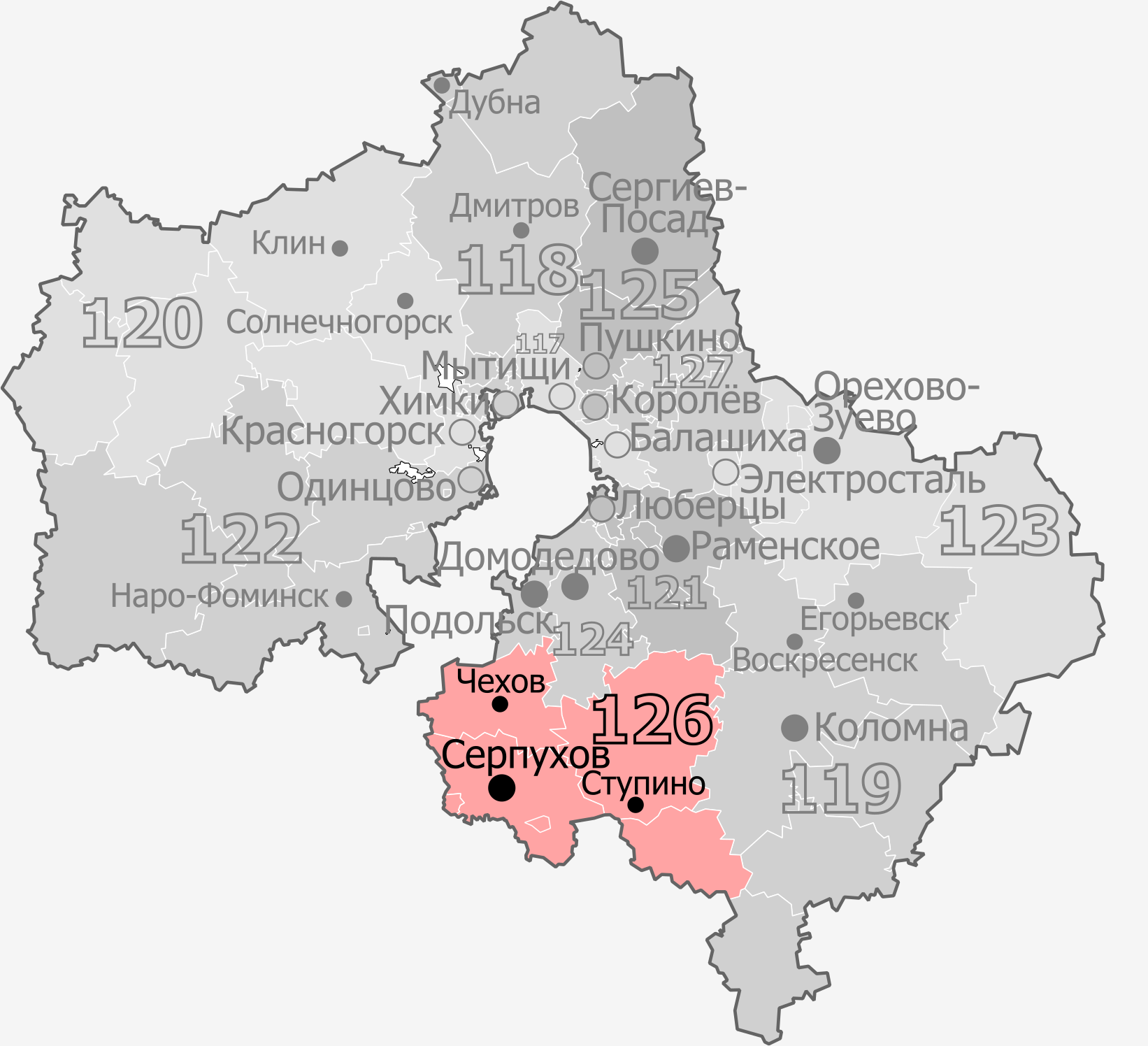
Constituency boundaries from 2016 to 2026

2016–2026: Chekhov, Kashira, Ozyory, Protvino, Pushchino, Serpukhov, Stupino
The constituency was re-created for the 2016 election and retained most of its former territory, losing only Domodedovo to Podolsk constituency. This seat instead gained Kashira from Kolomna constituency.

2026–present: Bronnitsy, Chekhov, Ramenskoye (Bykovo, Ganusovskoye, Ilyinsky, Kratovo, Nikonovskoye, Ramenskoye, Rodniki, Safonovskoye, Sofyinskoye, Udelnaya, Ulyaninskoye, Vereyskoye, Vyalkovskoye, Zabolotyevskoye), Serpukhov, Stupino
After the 2025 redistricting the constituency was significantly changed, losing Kashira to Kolomna constituency. This seat instead gained a strip across central Ramenskoye and Bronnitsy from Lyubertsy constituency.

== Members elected ==
Election	Member	Party
1995	Georgy Tikhonov	Power to the People
1999	Georgy Tikhonov	Independent
2003	Vladimir Smolensky	Independent
2007	Proportional representation - no election by constituency	
2011	Proportional representation - no election by constituency	
2016	Yury Oleynikov	United Russia
2021	Aleksandr Kogan	United Russia
2026	Aleksandr Kogan	United Russia

== Election results ==
=== 1995 ===
Summary of the 17 December 1995 Russian legislative election in the Serpukhov constituency
Candidate	Party	Votes	%
Georgy Tikhonov	Power to the People	59,743	19.47%
Vladimir Lukin (incumbent) (Note: redistricted from Odintsovo constituency)	Yabloko	43,972	14.33%
Valentina Kabanova	Independent	37,852	12.33%
Anatoly Sidorenko	Independent	23,905	7.79%
Irina Chernova	Democratic Choice of Russia – United Democrats	17,491	5.70%
Aleksandr Popov	Independent	13,369	4.36%
Ivan Silayev	Independent	12,395	4.04%
Aleksandr Bessmertnykh	Independent	11,689	3.81%
Ivan Panchishin	Forward, Russia!	8,604	2.80%
Yevgeny Sokolov	Liberal Democratic Party	6,919	2.25%
Sergey Volodin	Independent	6,208	2.02%
Viktor Ustinov	Ivan Rybkin Bloc	5,922	1.93%
Pyotr Stolyar	Independent	5,119	1.67%
Leonid Shpigel	Party of Economic Freedom	2,915	0.95%
Vladimir Burenin	Duma-96	1,450	0.47%
Aleksandr Krasnoperov	Independent	958	0.31%
against all		39,500	12.87%
Total		306,896	100%

=== 1999 ===
Summary of the 19 December 1999 Russian legislative election in the Serpukhov constituency
Candidate	Party	Votes	%
Georgy Tikhonov (incumbent)	Independent	55,579	18.81%
Marina Ignatova	Independent	46,438	15.72%
Yury Tebin	Independent	39,210	13.27%
Vera Mikheyeva	Independent	23,518	7.96%
Vitaly Pomazov	Yabloko	15,761	5.33%
Yury Gekht	Independent	15,381	5.21%
Vladimir Golovnyov	Spiritual Heritage	15,168	5.13%
Vladimir Alekseyev	Russian Socialist Party	13,213	4.47%
Aleksandr Kravchuk	Russian Patriotic Popular Movement	8,196	2.77%
Aleksandr Popov	Independent	7,497	2.54%
Nadia Yenikeyeva	Liberal Democratic Party	3,435	1.16%
Nikolay Yeremin	Our Home – Russia	3,056	1.03%
against all		41,695	14.11%
Total		295,481	100%

=== 2003 ===
Summary of the 7 December 2003 Russian legislative election in the Serpukhov constituency
Candidate	Party	Votes	%
Vladimir Smolensky	Independent	60,353	21.91%
Yulia Alekseyeva	Independent	43,544	15.81%
Georgy Tikhonov (incumbent)	Communist Party	43,027	15.62%
Artyom Lavrishchev	United Russia	39,438	14.32%
Vladislav Volkov	Liberal Democratic Party	11,221	4.07%
Olga Kudeshkina	Independent	7,684	2.79%
Stepan Shevchenko	Union of Right Forces	7,226	2.62%
Mikhail Chelnokov	Agrarian Party	4,459	1.62%
Leonid Baron	Party of Russia's Rebirth-Russian Party of Life	4,066	1.48%
against all		48,245	17.51%
Total		275,947	100%

=== 2016 ===
Summary of the 18 September 2016 Russian legislative election in the Serpukhov constituency
Candidate	Party	Votes	%
Yury Oleynikov	United Russia	71,019	39.51%
Boris Ivanyuzhenkov	Communist Party	21,330	11.87%
Pavel Zalesov	A Just Russia	20,908	11.63%
Anna Redchenko	Liberal Democratic Party	15,334	8.53%
Nikolay Kuznetsov	Yabloko	9,879	5.50%
Tatyana Rybina	Communists of Russia	8,599	4.78%
Pavel Khlyupin	Rodina	6,552	3.65%
Irina Vologdina	The Greens	5,700	3.17%
Lyudmila Chumakova	Party of Growth	4,832	2.69%
Lev Shchukin	People's Freedom Party	3,100	1.72%
Larisa Svintsova	Patriots of Russia	2,463	1.37%
Total		179,751	100%

=== 2021 ===
Summary of the 17-19 September 2021 Russian legislative election in the Serpukhov constituency
Candidate	Party	Votes	%
Aleksandr Kogan	United Russia	79,586	38.76%
Andrey Cherepennikov	Communist Party	39,036	19.01%
Dmitry Kalinin	Liberal Democratic Party	14,076	6.86%
Igor Luzin	Communists of Russia	10,975	5.35%
Aleksandr Pashkov	New People	9,441	4.60%
Nikolay Kuznetsov	Party of Growth	9,430	4.59%
Lilia Belova	The Greens	8,554	4.17%
Nikita Tamarkin	Party of Pensioners	7,893	3.84%
Pavel Khlyupin	Rodina	6,259	3.05%
Sergey Barsegyan	Russian Party of Freedom and Justice	4,512	2.20%
Total		205,325	100%

=== 2026 ===
Summary of the 18-20 September 2026 Russian legislative election in the Serpukhov constituency
Candidate	Party	Votes	%
Aleksandr Kogan (incumbent)	United Russia	137,469	52.20%
Aleksandr Naumov	Communist Party	42,421	16.11%
Maksim Valikov	Liberal Democratic Party	28,996	11.01%
Oleg Khomyakov	A Just Russia	18,161	6.90%
Ivan Gusev	Yabloko	11,259	4.28%
Lyudmila Aleksandrova	Party of Pensioners	11,066	4.20%
Anastasia Chuvakova	The Greens	10,158	3.86%
Total		263,361	100%
