= Aleksandr Kogan (politician) =

Russian politician

- Александр Коган
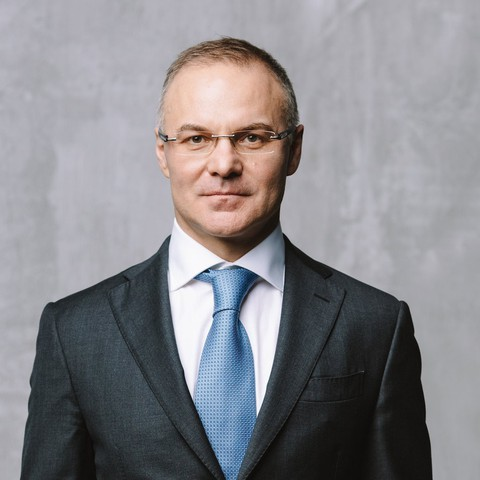
- official portrait, circa 2021

Member of the State Duma for Moscow Oblast
- Incumbent
- Assumed office 12 October 2021
- Preceded by: Yury Oleynikov
- Constituency: Serpukhov (No. 126)

Advisor to the Governor of Moscow Oblast
- In office 2018–2021

Minister of Ecology and Natural Resources of the Moscow Oblast
- In office 2015–2018

Member of the State Duma (Party List Seat)
- In office 24 December 2007 – 21 December 2011

Member of the State Duma for Orenburg Oblast
- In office 29 December 2003 – 24 December 2007
- Preceded by: Yury Nikiforenko
- Succeeded by: constituencies abolished
- Constituency: Orenburg (No. 132) (Note: Orenburg has been constituency No. 142 since 2016.)

Personal details
- Born: 26 February 1969 (age 57) Orsk, RSFSR, USSR
- Party: United Russia
- Spouse: Marina Ivanovna Kogan
- Children: Ekaterina; Maria
- Education: Orenburg Polytechnic Institute; RANEPA

Aleksandr Borisovich Kogan (Russian: Александр Борисович Коган; born 26 February 1969) is a Russian political figure and deputy of the 8th State Duma. In 2005, he was granted a Candidate of Sciences in Economics degree.

From 1998 to 2003, he was the deputy of the Legislative Assembly of the Orenburg Region. In 2002–2003, he was the deputy of the Orenburg City Council. In 2003, he was appointed deputy of the 4th State Duma from the Orenburg constituency. In 2007, he was re-elected for the 5th State Duma. In 2008–2016, he was a member of the general and supreme council of the United Russia party. From January to May 2012, he was the Advisor to the Minister of Economic Development of the Russian Federation. In 2012–2013, he served as the Minister of the Government of the Moscow Oblast for shared-equity housing construction and dilapidated housing. In April 2015, he was appointed Minister of Ecology and Natural Resources of the Moscow Oblast. In 2018, he became the Advisor to the Governor of the Moscow Oblast. Since September 2021, he has served as deputy of the 8th State Duma.

== Sanctions ==
He was sanctioned by the UK government in 2022 in relation to the Russo-Ukrainian War.
