= Nikolay Abramov (footballer, born 1950) =

Soviet and Russian footballer (1950–2005)

Personal information
- Full name: Nikolay Ivanovich Abramov
- Date of birth: 5 January 1950
- Place of birth: Kotelniki, Soviet Union
- Date of death: 6 August 2005 (aged 55)
- Place of death: Moscow, Soviet Union
- Position: Defender

Youth career
- 1968: FC Spartak Moscow

Senior career*
Years	Team	Apps	(Gls)
1969–1976	FC Spartak Moscow	137	(1)
1978–1982	FC Moskvich Moscow	52	(6)
1983–1984	FC Krasny Oktyabr Moscow		
1985–1986	FC Moskvich Moscow		

International career
1972–1976	USSR	3	(0)

Managerial career
- 1981: FC Moskvich Moscow (player-coach)
- 1982–1983: DYuSSh Neftyanik Moscow
- 2004–2005: FC Spartak Moscow (academy)
- * Club domestic league appearances and goals

Nikolay Ivanovich Abramov (Russian: Никола́й Ива́нович Абра́мов; 5 January 1950 – 6 August 2005) was a Soviet footballer.

== Honours ==
- Soviet Top League winner: 1969
- Soviet Cup winner: 1971

== International career ==
Abramov made his debut for USSR on 13 May 1972 in the UEFA Euro 1972 quarterfinal against Yugoslavia.
