= Roman Teryushkov =

Russian politician

- Роман Терюшков
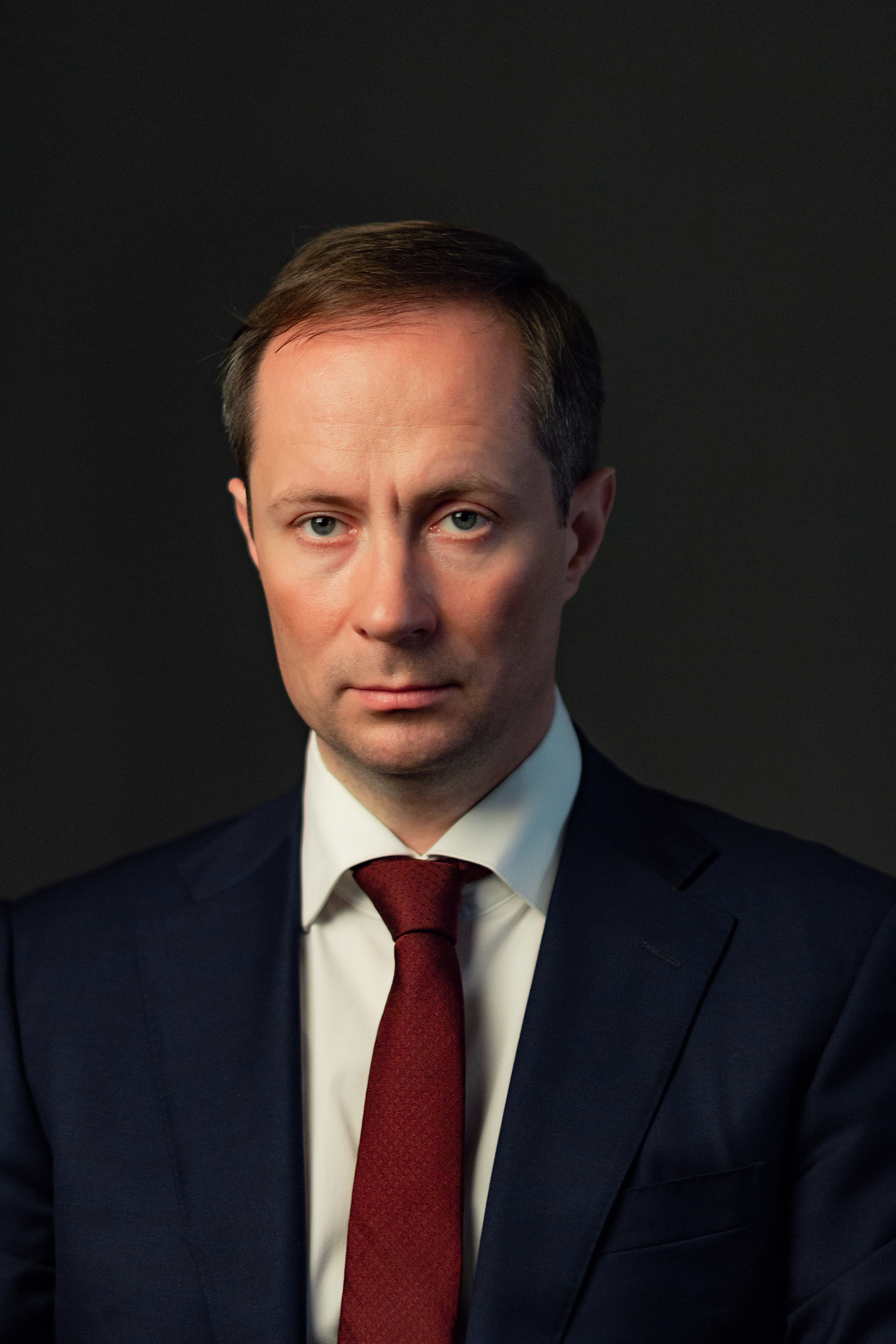

Member of the State Duma for Moscow Oblast
- Incumbent
- Assumed office 12 October 2021
- Preceded by: Lydia Antonova
- Constituency: Lyubertsy (No. 121)

Personal details
- Born: 20 December 1979 (age 46) Moscow, RSFSR, USSR
- Party: United Russia
- Education: Moscow State Agroengineering University

Roman Igorevich Teryushkov (Russian: Роман Игоревич Терюшков; born 20 December 1979, Moscow) is a Russian political figure, a deputy of the 8th State Duma, and a former Minister of Physical Culture and Sports of the Moscow Oblast.

From 2002 to 2005, Teryushkov worked as a financial analyst and, later, as the head of the financial department of Ecoreserve LLC. In 2006-2007, he was the deputy chief of the Young Guard of United Russia. From 2007 to 2009, Teryushkov was the head of the department of mass youth programs and, later, the Deputy Head of the Central Headquarters of the Young Guard of United Russia. In 2012-2013, he headed the Golovinsky District. From 2014 to 2021, he was the Minister of Physical Culture and Sports of the Moscow Oblast. Since September 2021, he has served as deputy of the 8th State Duma.

Teryushkov has said that Russian athletes should be deemed guilty of “treason” if they switch national allegiances to another country.

In February 2024, he filed a denunciation against the philosopher Yulia Sineokaya, after which the Russian Academy of Sciences stripped her, as a corresponding member, of a commemorative medal due to her status as a “foreign agent.” On his social media page, the deputy stated that he would continue to seek the revocation of the payments to which Yulia Sineokaya is entitled as a corresponding member of the Academy of Sciences, as well as the expulsion from the Russian Academy of Sciences of all scholars who have been designated “foreign agents” in Russia.

== Sanctions ==
He was sanctioned by the UK government in 2022 in relation to the Russo-Ukrainian War.
