= Yulia Sineokaya =

Russian philosopher (born 1969)

- Born: March 1, 1969 (age 57); Moscow, USSR
- Citizenship: Russia
- Education: Moscow State University
- Scientific career
- Fields: history of philosophy
- Institutions: Institute of Philosophy
- Doctoral advisor: Nelli Motroshilova

Yulia Vadimovna Sineokaya (Russian: Юлия Вадимовна Синеокая, born March 1, 1969, in Moscow) is a Russian philosopher, specialising in the history of European and Russian philosophy. Doctor of Sciences in Philosophy (2009), Professor of the Russian Academy of Sciences (2015), Corresponding member of the Russian Academy of Sciences (2019).

== Biography ==
Sineokaya studied philosophy at Lomonosov Moscow State University.

After graduation (1992) she joined the Institute of Philosophy of the Russian Academy of Sciences and made there a scientific career via the PhD defense (1996) to the Doctor of Sciences degree (2009) and the positions of a head of the History of Western Philosophy Department (since 2016) and deputy director for Research (also since 2016).

She also has over 20 years of teaching experience at education establishments in Moscow including her alma mater.

In 2000–2007 she was Honorary Research Fellow at the Centre for Russian and East European Studies at the University of Birmingham (UK).

In 2015 Sineokaya was awarded the honorary title of the Professor of the Russian Academy of Sciences, and in 2019 she was elected to corresponding membership in the academy.

=== Persecution ===
On 16 February 2024, the Ministry of Justice of Russia added her to the list of individuals designated as “foreign agents”.

In February 2024, State Duma deputy from the United Russia party Roman Teryushkov called on the Russian Academy of Sciences to take measures against Sineokaya, after which she was stripped of the commemorative medal awarded for the Academy’s 300th anniversary due to her status as a “foreign agent”. On his social media page, the deputy stated that he would further seek to deprive Yulia Sineokaya of the payments due to her as a corresponding member of the Russian Academy of Sciences, as well as the expulsion from the Academy of all scholars who have been designated “foreign agents” in Russia.

== Research activity ==
Sineokaya conducts research on the history of European and Russian philosophy, from the second half of the 19th to the 20th century, developing a concept of mutual influence of Russian and German philosophical traditions during this period.

Sineokaya is known as the first Russian scholar focusing on the history of the Nietzsche reception in Russia. She is a member of the editorial board of the Russian edition of Friedrich Nietzsche's Complete Works in 13 volumes.

Her original method of historical analysis is based on the argument that the starting point for a study of philosophical paradigms are not ideas but existentials. The key element of her approach to the historically oriented study of the formation of the Russian philosophical tradition is the concept of "philosophical generation".

Sineokaya has launched several projects aimed at introducing academic philosophy into the public space. For her international educational project "Anatomy of Philosophy" (co-organized by the Institute of Philosophy and the Dostoevsky Library in Moscow) she was awarded the Gold Medal of the Russian Academy of Sciences in the nomination "Humanities and Social Sciences" (2016).

She is editor-in-chief of the History of Philosophy Yearbook and member of the International Scientific Council of Academia Kantiana at Immanuel Kant Baltic Federal University.

== Some publications ==
- Philosophical generations. Comp. and ed. by Yulia V. Sineokaya. Moscow: LRC Publishing House, 2022.
- The Prohibited Nietzsche: Anti-Nietzscheanism in Soviet Russia. In: Studies in East European Thought, 2018, vol. 70/4, pp. 273–288.
- Friedrich Nietzsche: Legacy and Prospects. Comp. and ed. by Yulia V. Sineokaya and Ekaterina A. Polyakova. Moscow: LRC Publishing House, 2017.
- The Problem of European Unification in the Context of Nietzsche's Philosophy. In: Russian Studies in Philosophy, 2011, vol. 50/1, pp. 74–90.
- Three Images of Nietzsche in Russian Culture. Moscow: Institute of Philosophy Press, 2008.
- The Problem of the Overman in Nietzsche and Solov’ev. In: Vladimir Solov’ev und Friedrich Nietzsche: Eine deutsche-russische kulturelle Jahrhundertbilanz. Frankfurt am Main: Peter Lang, 2003. P. 507–526 (also in Russian Studies of Philosophy, 2002–2003, vol. 41/3, pp. 63–81).
- Nietzsches Philosophie und die russische geistige Renaissance zu Beginn des 20. Jahrhunderts. In: Wiener Jahrbuch für Philosophie, 2000, Bd. XXXI, S. 99–118.
