= Lyubery =

Soviet youth group

The Lyubers (Russian: люберы, romanized: lyubery or Russian: любера, romanized: lyubera) was a Soviet youth movement active from the late 1970s until the early 1990s. The movement's name comes from the city of Lyubertsy, Moscow Oblast, where the movement emerged; however, the movement later expanded to several cities across the USSR.

It was dedicated to promoting an athletic lifestyle, engaging in activities such as bodybuilding in basement gyms, boxing, swimming, athletics, gymnastics, and other forms of sport. It was at odds with "informal" youth subcultures such as hippies, punks, and metalheads.

== History ==
The Lyuber movement began in the late 1970s, when towns in the Moscow Oblast were rapidly developing and growing in population. In the wake of preparations for the 1980 Summer Olympics, strength sports schools actively developed with the support of local authorities in the Moscow capital region. Bodybuilding became fashionable and, despite its formal ban, flourished in the city.

Teenagers and pre-conscription youth formed the core of the movement. The Lyuber movement began to expand rapidly; by the mid-1980s, it had made a name for itself in physically attacking the "informal" groups that represented various Western subcultures that they viewed as decadent. These attacks were mainly carried out in major cities such as Moscow at events such as rock concerts or in public spaces, but attacking women and couples was strongly discouraged within the movement. In addition, Lyubers also held strong anti-fascist views and fought the emerging neo-Nazi groups. On 20 April 1982, the first mass clash between Lyubers and neo-fascists occurred on Pushkin Square in Moscow, ending in physical violence. According to some reports, the Moscow police, who were also planning to disperse the neo-fascists, assisted the Lyubers.

The Lyuber movement had reached its peak in the spring of 1987, when it had become fashionable. In addition, sympathetic youth from other towns of the Moscow Oblast also began calling themselves "Lyubers"; thus, the word was used to describe a member of the specific subculture, regardless of place of residence. Popular Lyuber gathering places in Moscow included cafes on Arbat Street and Kalininsky Prospekt (now New Arbat Avenue); occasionally, "informals" (mostly metalheads) would travel in large groups to these places to retaliate against Lyubers.

In late 1989, with the onset of political and economic upheaval and the collapse of the USSR, the movement declined; it ceased to exist by 1991. After the movement's dissolution, most members retreated to a quiet life; some former members turned to crime, joining groups such as the Lyubertsy Organized Crime Group.
