= Klimovsk =

Klimovsk Климовск
- Town
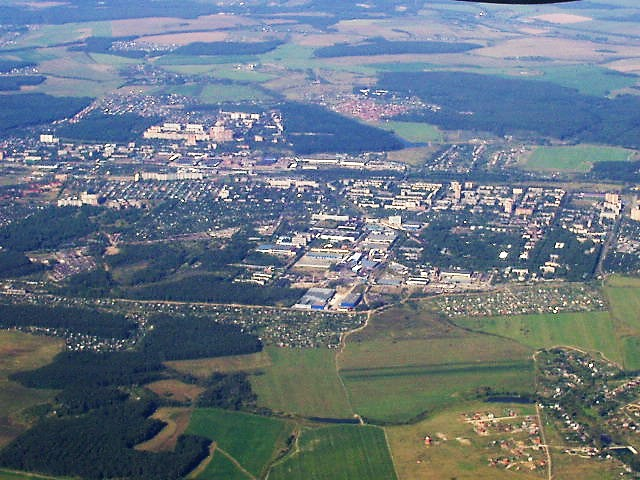
- Aerial view of Klimovsk

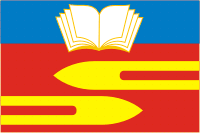
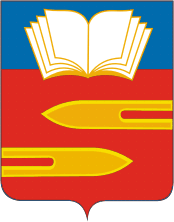
- Flag Coat of arms
- Interactive map of Klimovsk
- Location of Klimovsk Klimovsk (Moscow Oblast)
- Coordinates: 55°22′N 37°32′E
- Country: Russia
- Federal subject: Moscow Oblast
- Founded: first half of the 19th century
- Town status since: October 7, 1940
- Elevation: 175 m (574 ft)

Population (2010 Census)
  - Total: 56,186
  - Estimate (2015): 56,239 (+0.1%)
  - Rank: 293rd in 2010

Administrative status
  - Subordinated to: Klimovsk Town Under Oblast Jurisdiction
  - Capital of: Klimovsk Town Under Oblast Jurisdiction

Municipal status
  - Urban okrug: Klimovsk Urban Okrug
  - Capital of: Klimovsk Urban Okrug
- Postal codes: 142180–142182, 142184
- Website: www.klimovsk.ru

Klimovsk (Russian: Кли́мовск, IPA: [ˈklʲiməfsk]) is a city in Podolsk Urban Okrug, Moscow Oblast, Russia, located 55 kilometers (34 mi) south of Moscow and 8 kilometers (5.0 mi) south of Podolsk. Population: 56,186 (2010 census); 55,644 (2002 census); 56,720 (1989 Soviet census).

== History ==
Klimovsk was founded in the first half of the 19th century as a village with the name of Klimovka (Кли́мовка), which was close to the Moscow–Serpukhov–Tula road. The basic employment of the peasants was agriculture and cattle breeding.

It was renamed Klimovsk in 1883 and granted town status on October 7, 1940. The occurrence and development of Klimovsk is closely connected to the history of a machine-building factory. The Moscow–Kursk railway laid in the immediate proximity of the village has allowed a group of manufacturers in 1882 to begin here the construction of a factory for the manufacture of spare parts for the weaving looms necessary for the cotton-mills of the central provinces of Russia.

When its status as a town was abolished in 2015, it became part of the city of Podolsk. It was the only inhabited locality of the former Klimovsk Urban Okrug.

== Twin towns and sister cities ==
Klimovsk is twinned with:

- Novocheboksarsk, Russia
- Ihtiman, Bulgaria
