= Sergei Lobanov (footballer) =

Russian footballer

Personal information
- Full name: Sergei Viktorovich Lobanov
- Date of birth: 1 March 1984 (age 42)
- Place of birth: Lyubertsy, Russian SFSR
- Height: 1.78 m (5 ft 10 in)
- Position: Midfielder

Youth career
- DYuSSh Vitebsk

Senior career*
Years	Team	Apps	(Gls)
2002	Belshina Bobruisk	0	(0)
2003	Molodechno-2000	0	(0)
2004	BSK Spirovo	6	(0)
2006	Lokomotiv-KMV Mineralnye Vody		
2007	Nara-Desna Naro-Fominsk	13	(0)
2008	Neman Grodno	7	(0)
2008	Podolye Voronovo	13	(0)
2009	MVD Rossii-2 Moscow		
2010	Dynamo-Biolog Novokubansk		
2011	Sheksna Cherepovets	12	(1)
- * Club domestic league appearances and goals

Sergei Viktorovich Lobanov (Russian: Серге́й Викторович Лобанов; born 1 March 1984) is a former Russian professional football player.

== Club career ==
He played in the Belarusian Premier League in 2008 for FC Neman Grodno.
