= Podolsky District =

Podolsky District Подольский район (Russian)
- District
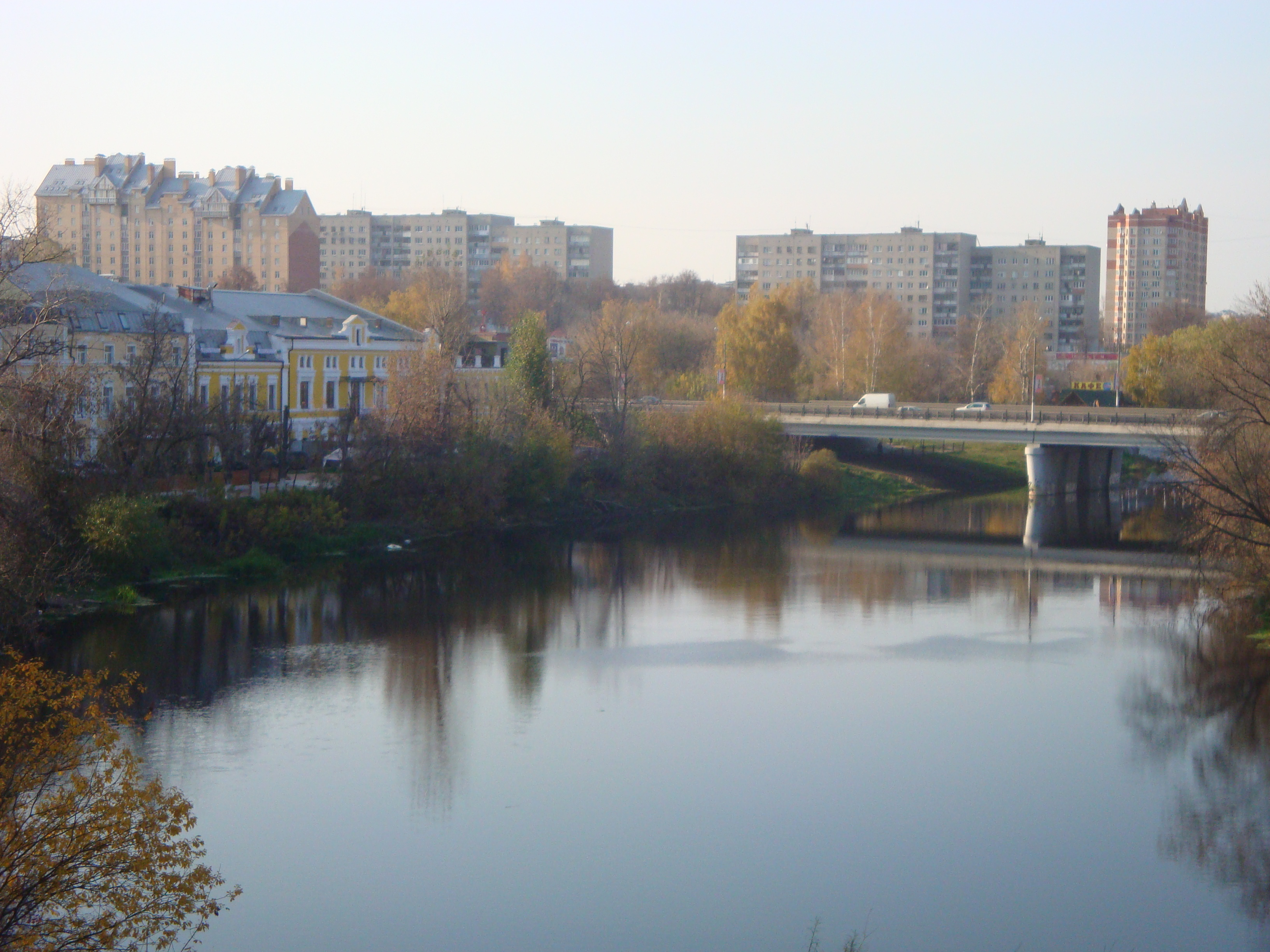
- View of Podolsk, Podolsky District

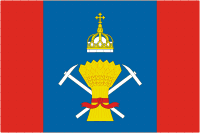
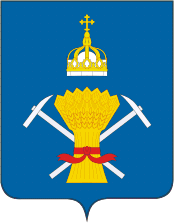
- Flag Coat of arms
- Location of Podolsky District in Moscow Oblast
- Coordinates: 55°25′N 37°33′E
- Country: Russia
- Federal subject: Moscow Oblast
- Established: 12 July 1929
- Administrative center: Podolsk

Area
  - Total: 281.45 km^{2} (108.67 sq mi)

Population (2010 Census)
  - Total: 82,488
  - Density: 293.08/km^{2} (759.08/sq mi)
  - Urban: 13.2%
  - Rural: 86.8%

Administrative structure
  - Administrative divisions: 1 Work settlements, 3 Rural settlements
  - Inhabited localities: 1 urban-type settlements, 75 rural localities

Municipal structure
  - Municipally incorporated as: Podolsky Municipal District
  - Municipal divisions: 1 urban settlements, 3 rural settlements

Podolsky District (Russian: Подо́льский райо́н) is an abolished administrative and municipal district (raion), one of the thirty-six in Moscow Oblast, Russia. It was located in the southwest of the oblast just south of the federal city of Moscow. The area of the district was 281.45 square kilometers (108.67 sq mi). Its administrative center was the city of Podolsk (which is not administratively a part of the district).

== History ==
A part of Podolsky District was merged into the federal city of Moscow on July 1, 2012. In 2015, the district has been abolished, its territory, with the city of Podolsk, was included in the City Under Oblast Jurisdiction with the administrative territory and Podolsk Urban Okrug.

== Notable residents ==
- Matvey Chizhov (1838–1916), sculptor, born in the village of Pudov
