= Podolsk Urban Okrug =

Municipal formation in Moscow Oblast, Russia

Coordinates: 55°23′27″N 37°32′33″E

Podolsk Urban Okrug ("Big Podolsk") is a municipal formation located in the southeastern part of Moscow Oblast, Russia. Its administrative center is the city of Podolsk. Its territory includes the city of Podolsk and 75 rural localities – selos, villages, and rural-type settlements that were included in the okrug with the abolition of the Podolsk district in 2015.

== Geography ==
Total area: 339.11 km^{2}

Rural area: 275.22 km^{2}

City area: 69.89 km^{2}
