= Lyubertsy =

City in Moscow Oblast, Russia

Lyubertsy Люберцы
- City
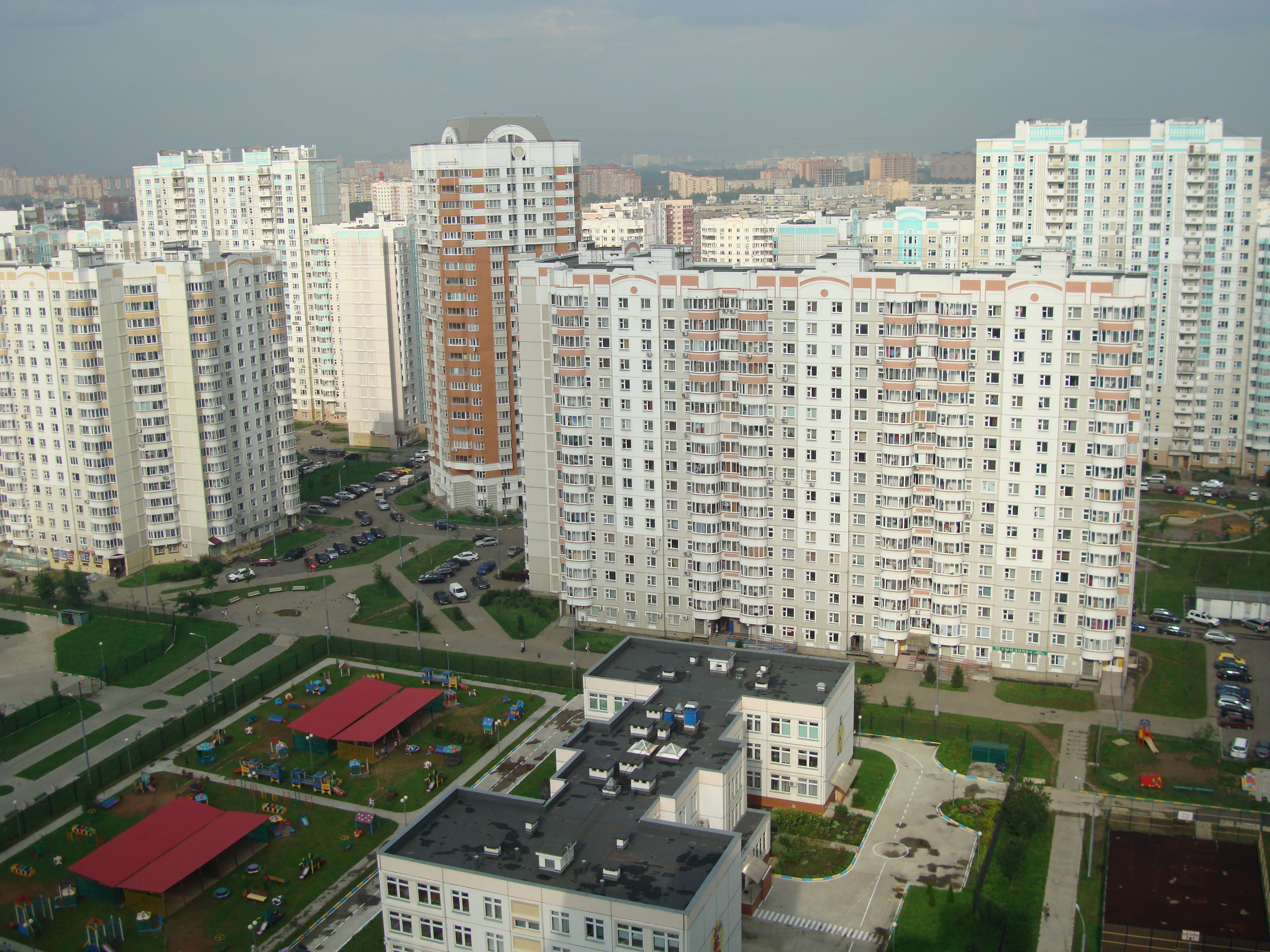
- View of Lyubertsy

- Flag Coat of arms
- Interactive map of Lyubertsy
- Location of Lyubertsy Lyubertsy (European Russia) Lyubertsy (Europe)
- Coordinates: 55°40′42″N 37°53′40″E
- Country: Russia
- Federal subject: Moscow Oblast
- Administrative district: Lyuberetsky District
- CitySelsoviet: Lyubertsy
- First mentioned: 1621
- City status since: 1925
- Elevation: 130 m (430 ft)

Population (2010 Census)
  - Total: 172,525
  - Estimate (2025): 238,534 (+38.3%)
  - Rank: 106th in 2010

Administrative status
  - Capital of: Lyuberetsky District, City of Lyubertsy

Municipal status
  - Municipal district: Lyuberetsky Municipal District
  - Urban settlement: Lyubertsy Urban Settlement
  - Capital of: Lyuberetsky Municipal District, Lyubertsy Urban Settlement
- Time zone: UTC+3 (MSK)
- Postal codes: 140000, 140002–140014, 140020, 140025, 140026, 140028, 140079, 994002
- Dialing code: +7 495
- OKTMO ID: 46748000001
- Website: www.luberadm.ru

Lyubertsy (Russian: Люберцы, IPA: [ˈlʲʉbʲɪrtsɨ]) is a city and the administrative center of Lyuberetsky District in Moscow Oblast, Russia.

== Demographics ==
Population: 224,195 (2021 census); 172,525 (2010 census); 156,691 (2002 census); 165,478 (1989 Soviet census).

Historical population
| Year | Pop. | ±% |
|---|---|---|
| 1926 | 10,000 | — |
| 1939 | 46,491 | +364.9% |
| 1959 | 93,255 | +100.6% |
| 1970 | 139,401 | +49.5% |
| 1979 | 159,563 | +14.5% |
| 1989 | 165,478 | +3.7% |
| 2002 | 156,691 | −5.3% |
| 2010 | 172,525 | +10.1% |
| 2021 | 224,195 | +29.9% |
Source: Census data

== History ==
It was first mentioned in 1621 and was granted town status in 1925. It is sometimes described as a working class suburb of Moscow.

In 1909 International Harvester bought now defunct Uhtomsky factory which before produced railway air brakes and was called "New York" and was repurposed to produce agricultural equipment. It was closed in 2007.

Lyubertsy was the home and namesake of the Lyubery youth movement in the 1980s, an initiative which encouraged physical fitness and stood against alternative youth subcultures. During the perestroika years of the 1990s, the Lyubers, and by association Lyubertsy, formed a part of the emerging organized crime syndicates.

== Administrative and municipal status ==
Within the framework of administrative divisions, Lyubertsy serves as the administrative center of Lyuberetsky District. As an administrative division, it is incorporated within Lyuberetsky District as the Town of Lyubertsy. As a municipal division, the Town of Lyubertsy is incorporated within Lyuberetsky Municipal District as Lyubertsy Urban Settlement.

== Economy ==
Lyubertsy is a major industrial center. There are over twenty-five industrial enterprises and a large railway junction. Prevailing branches of industry are mechanical engineering, metalworking, production of construction materials, woodworking, and food processing.

The largest enterprises include:

- Kamov company. Ukhtomsky Helicopter plant named after N. I. Kamov (developer of the Ka-50 "Black Shark" and Ka-52 "Alligator" helicopters)
- Ukhtomsky machine-building plant, making equipment for raising livestock
- "Torgmash" joint-stock company produces manufacturing equipment
- A construction materials plant
- "Lyuberetskye carpets" collective
- "Belaya dacha" agricultural processing plant, a supplier for McDonald's

== Notable people ==
- Sergey Abeltsev, politician
- Michael Belov, racing driver
- Yuri Gagarin, first human in space
- Sasha Galitsky (born 1957), visual artist
- Alexander Menshikov, assistant of Peter the Great
- Sergei Lobanov, Russian Second Division football player
- Nikolay Rastorguyev, lead singer of rock group Lyube
- Boris Razinsky, Olympic champion association football player
- Vasily Yakemenko, youth politician
- Edward Snowden, NSA whistleblower
