= Leninsky District, Moscow Oblast =

Leninsky District Ленинский район (Russian)
- District
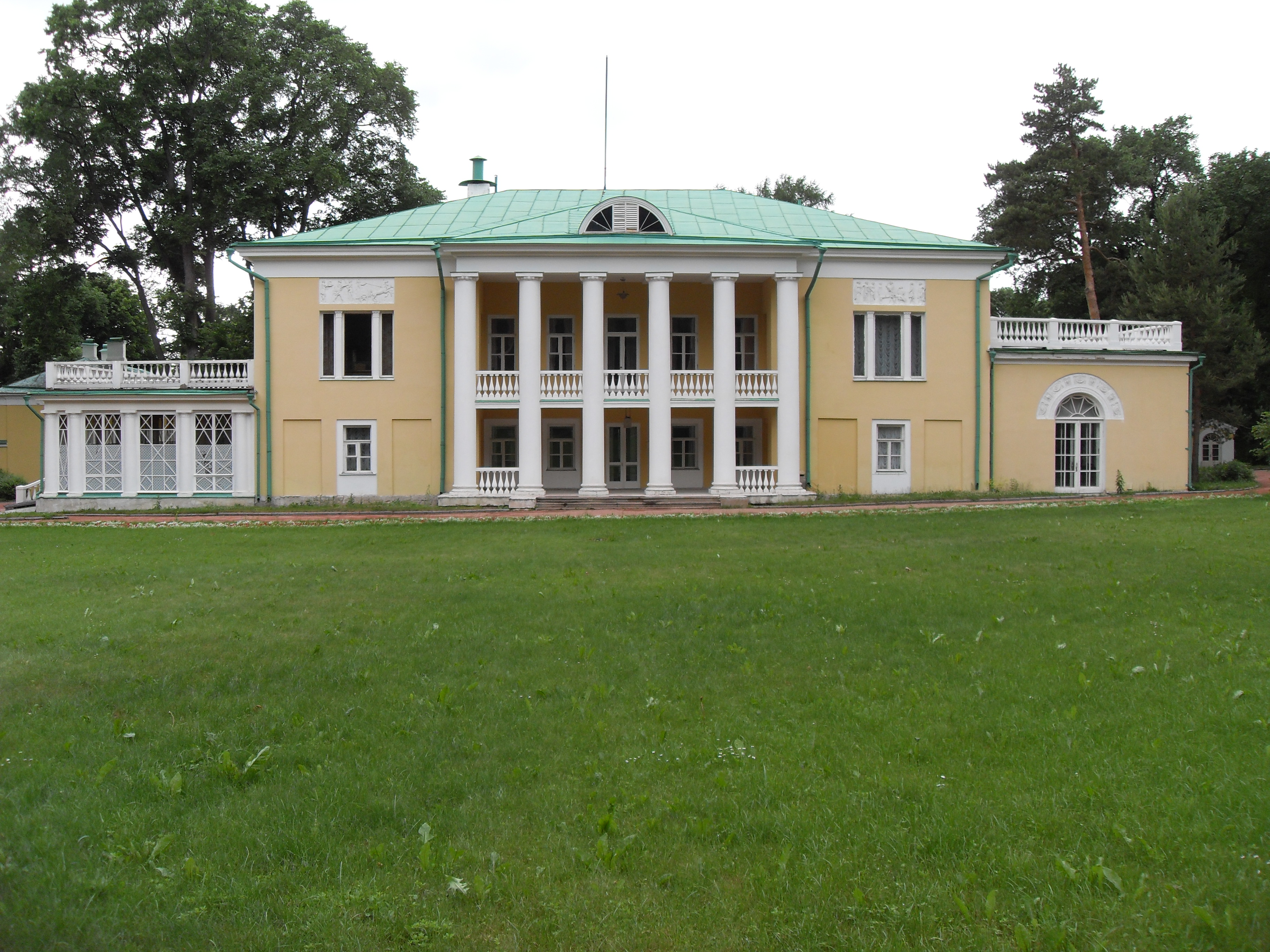
- Lenin Museum in Leninsky District

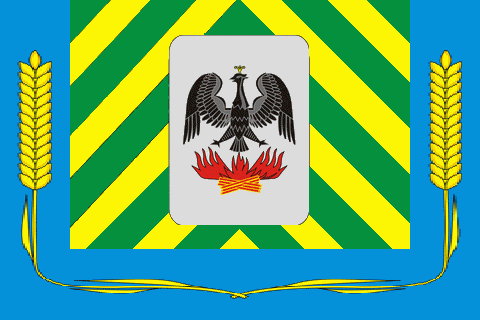
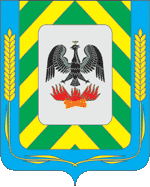
- Flag Coat of arms
- Location of Leninsky District in Moscow Oblast
- Coordinates: 55°33′N 37°42′E
- Country: Russia
- Federal subject: Moscow Oblast
- Established: 2019
- Administrative center: Vidnoye

Area
  - Total: 202.83 km^{2} (78.31 sq mi)

Population (2010 Census)
  - Total: 172,171
  - Density: 848.84/km^{2} (2,198.5/sq mi)
  - Urban: 45.1%
  - Rural: 54.9%

Administrative structure
  - Administrative divisions: 1 Towns, 1 Work settlements, 5 Rural settlements
  - Inhabited localities: 1 cities/towns, 1 urban-type settlements, 53 rural localities

Municipal structure
  - Municipally incorporated as: Leninsky Municipal District
  - Municipal divisions: 2 urban settlements, 5 rural settlements
- Time zone: UTC+3 (MSK)
- OKTMO ID: 46707
- Website: https://www.adm-vidnoe.ru/

Leninsky District (Russian: Ле́нинский райо́н) is an administrative and municipal district (raion), one of the thirty-six in Moscow Oblast, Russia. It is located in the center of the oblast just south of the federal city of Moscow. The area of the district is 202.83 square kilometers (78.31 sq mi). Its administrative center is the town of Vidnoye. Population: 172,171 (2010 census); 145,251 (2002 Census); 74,490 (1989 Soviet census). The population of Vidnoye accounts for 33.0% of the district's total population.

== History ==
A major part of Leninsky District was merged into the federal city of Moscow on July 1, 2012.

== Culture ==
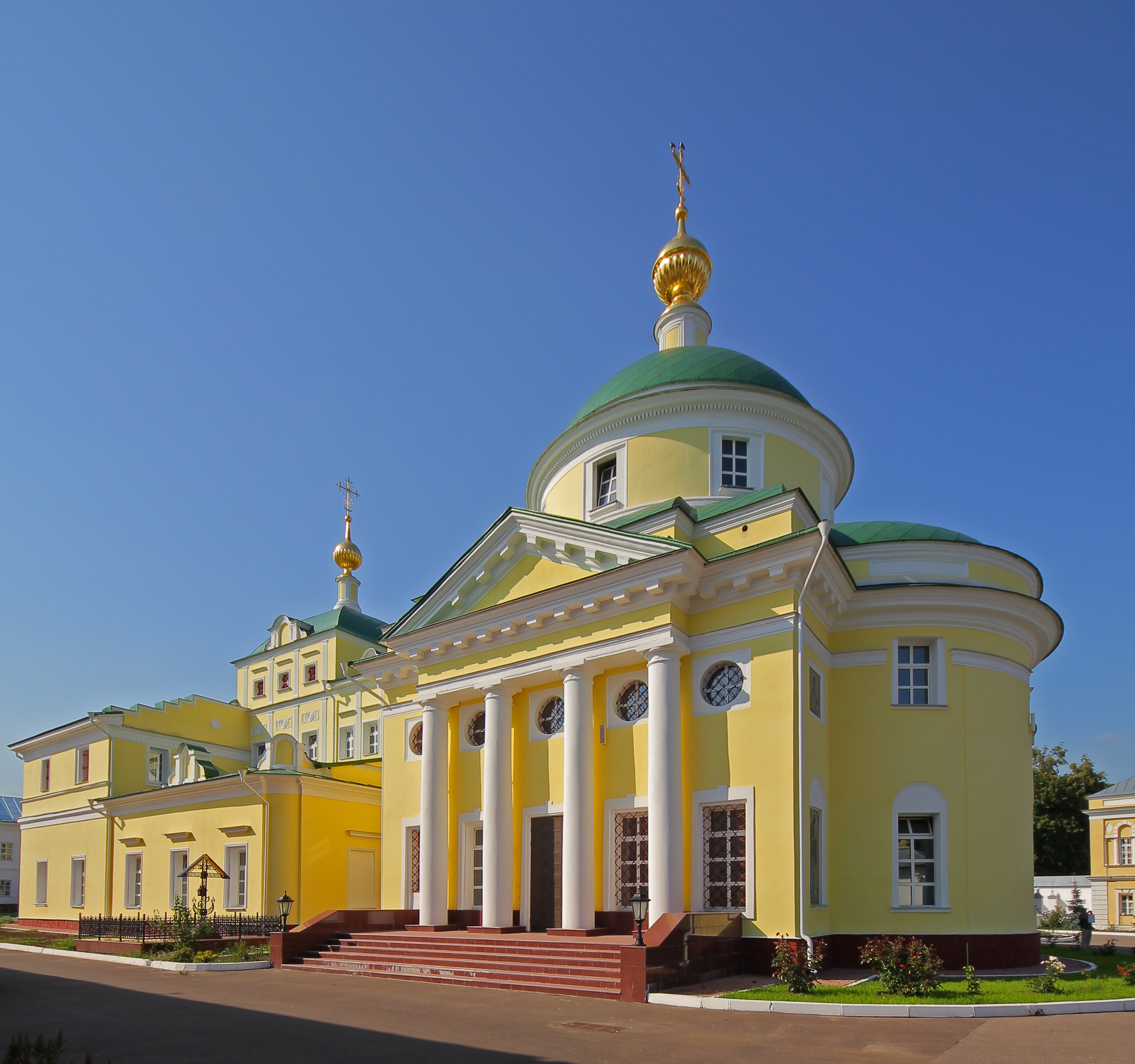
St. Catherine's monastery

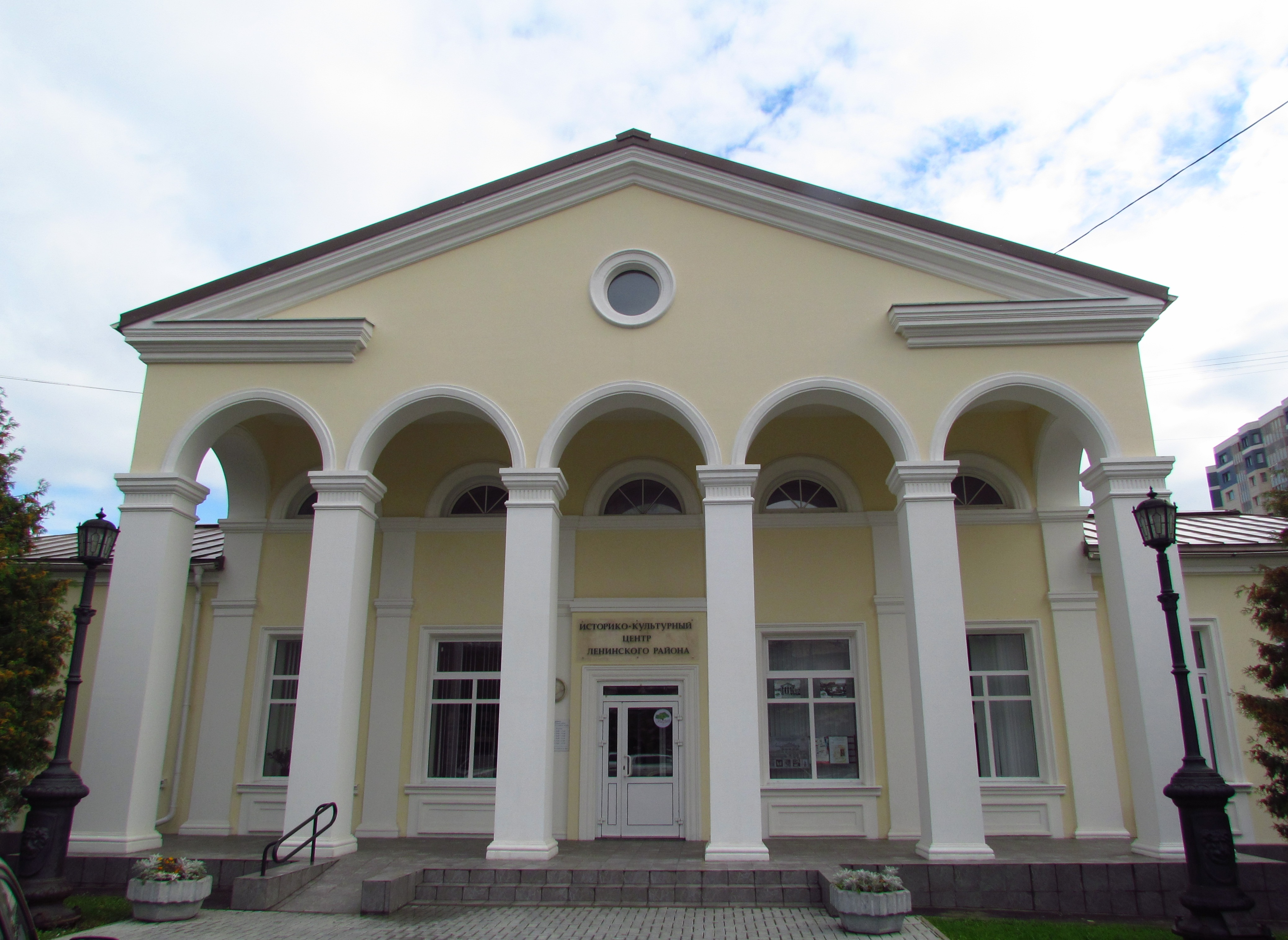
Leninskiy District Historical and Cultural Center (Vidnoye)

- St. Catherine's monastery
- Soviet Square and Leninskiy District Historical and Cultural Center (Vidnoye)

== Notable residents ==
- Vasily Molokov (1895–1982), Soviet pilot, a Hero of the Soviet Union, born in Irininskoye village – now called Molokovo
- Oleg Vidov (1943–2017), film director, born in either Leninsky District or Vidnoye
