= Lyuberetsky District =

Lyuberetsky District Люберецкий район (Russian)
- District
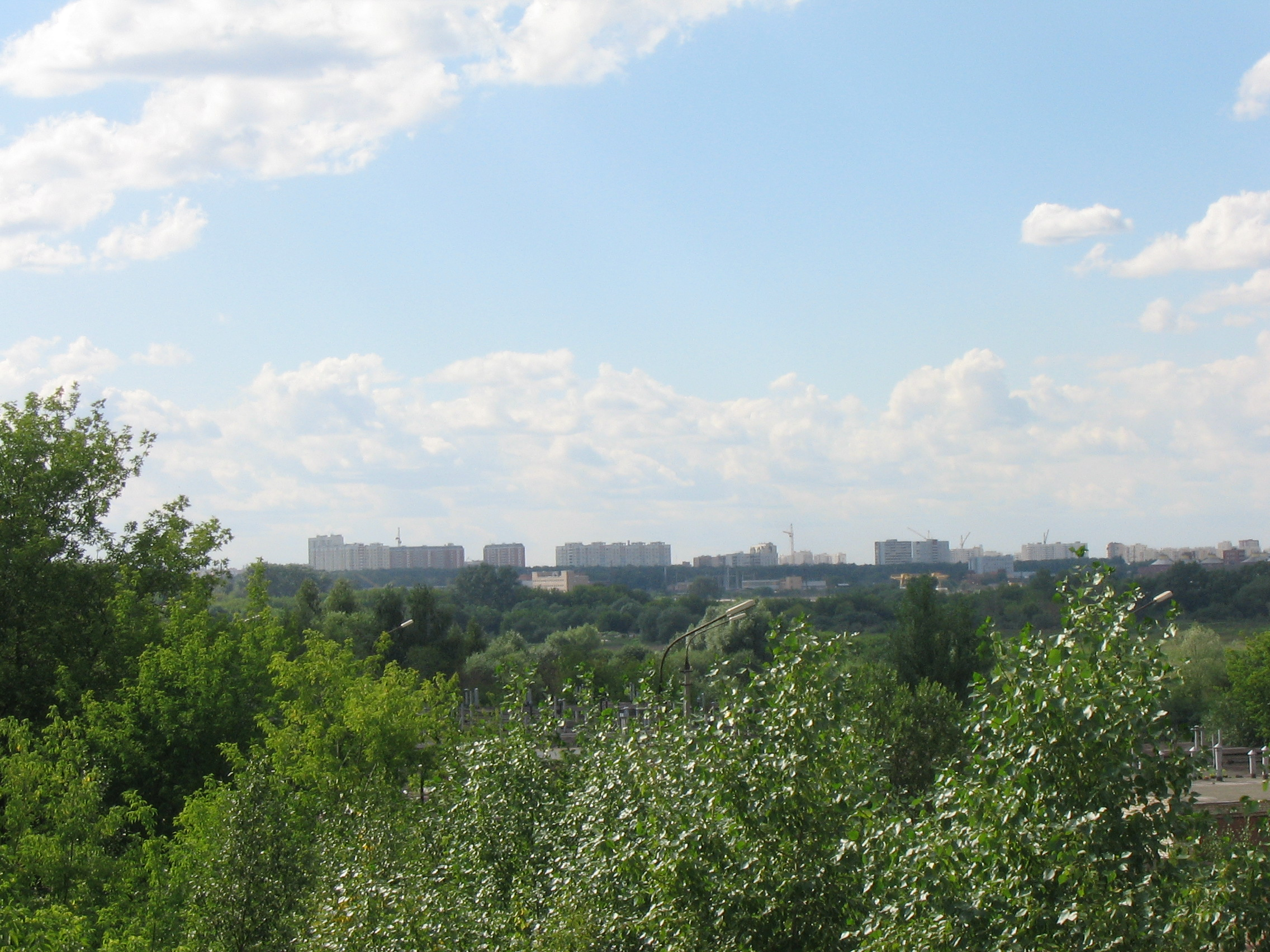
- View from the railroad, Lyuberetsky District

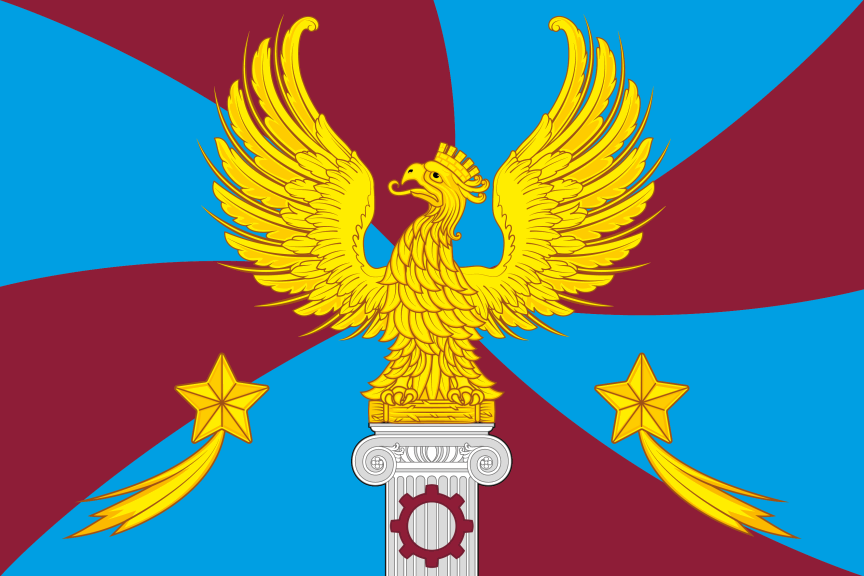
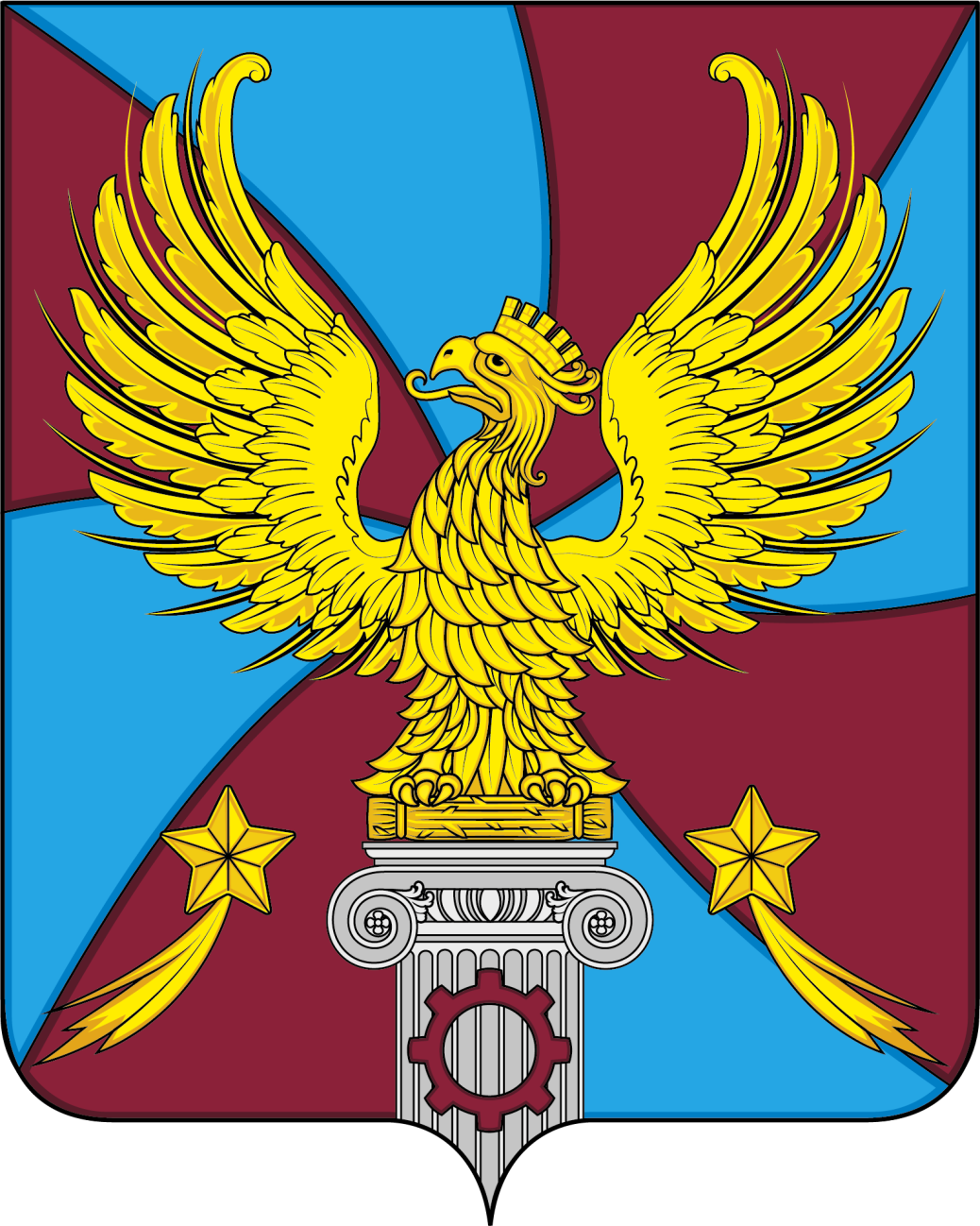
- Flag Coat of arms
- Location of Lyuberetsky District in Moscow Oblast (prior to July 2012)
- Coordinates: 55°41′N 37°53′E
- Country: Russia
- Federal subject: Moscow Oblast
- Established: 12 July 1929
- Administrative center: Lyubertsy

Area
  - Total: 122.31 km^{2} (47.22 sq mi)

Population (2010 Census)
  - Total: 265,113
  - Density: 2,167.5/km^{2} (5,613.9/sq mi)
  - Urban: 98.7%
  - Rural: 1.3%

Administrative structure
  - Administrative divisions: 2 Towns, 4 Work settlements and suburban settlements
  - Inhabited localities: 2 cities/towns, 4 urban-type settlements, 17 rural localities

Municipal structure
  - Municipally incorporated as: Lyuberetsky Municipal District
  - Municipal divisions: 5 urban settlements, 0 rural settlements
- Time zone: UTC+3 (MSK)
- OKTMO ID: 46631000
- Website: http://www.lubreg.ru/

Lyuberetsky District (Russian: Любере́цкий райо́н) is an administrative and municipal district (raion), one of the thirty-six in Moscow Oblast, Russia. It is located in the central part of the oblast east of the federal city of Moscow. The area of the district is 122.31 square kilometers (47.22 sq mi). Its administrative center is the city of Lyubertsy. Population: 265,113 (2010 Census); 255,720 (2002 census); 139,730 (1989 Soviet census). The population of Lyubertsy accounts for 65.1% of the district's total population.
