= Sasha Galitsky =

Russian and Israeli visual artist (born 1957)

- סשה גליצקי
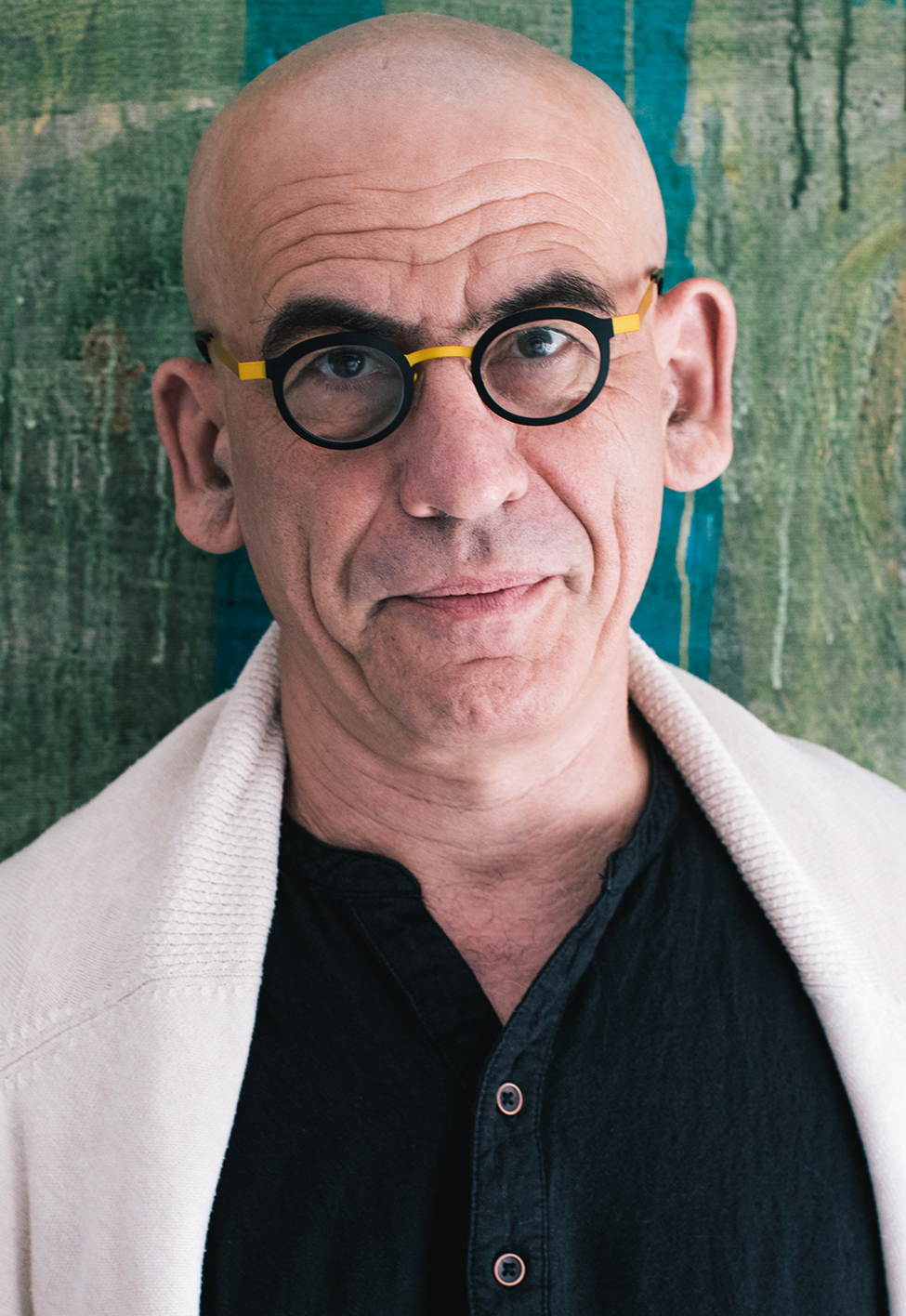
- Born: Alexander Galitsky; 8 March 1957 (age 69); Lubertsy, Moscow oblast, USSR
- Occupations: Visual artist, sculptor, writer, art therapist
- Awards: Ministry of Aliyah and Integration prize

Alexander "Sasha" Galitsky (Hebrew: סשה גליצקי; born 3 August 1957) is a Russian and Israeli artist, sculptor, writer, and art therapist. He is the author of a course for the social and psychological rehabilitation of the elderly through creativity, and the founder of "The Silver Age Art Museum" and "Baobab" studio.

== Life and career ==
Galitsky's paintings have been exhibited in Perm Museum of Contemporary Art in Perm, Russia, the Moscow Manege, the Israel Museum, the «Tzuk Gallery» in Netanya, Israel, and other places.

In 1990 he emigrated to Israel, and soon opened a mobile wood sculpture studio in ten homes for the elderly. In 2023, together with his wife and constant collaborator Tanya, Sasha founded the non-profit foundation "TEDY" (an abbreviation for the phrase "craft play live", in Hebrew תמיכה דרך יצירה), which within two years opened all over the country nearly 30 mobile art studios BAOBAB for wood sculpture and other types of handicrafts and crafts that require complex logistics. BAOBAB's mobile workshops work with people experiencing post-traumatic stress disorder due to war, evacuation, loss of loved ones, destruction of their homes; in studios the elderly step by step regain a sense of resilience and stability – through human warmth, participation, and the joy of creativity.

His book, "Mom, Don't Worry! How to Learn to Communicate with Elderly Parents Without Going Crazy Yourself?" (2016) became a bestseller sold over 25,000 copies, and the book "Don't Be Afraid! How to Grow Old Without Going Crazy?" has already been reprinted four times.

== Awards ==
2017: Israel Ministry of Aliyah and Integration's Yuri Stern Prize for Oleh Artists 2017

== Websites ==
- Official website
- The Silver Age Art Museum
