= Kotelniki =

Town in Moscow Oblast, Russia

Kotelniki Котельники
- Town
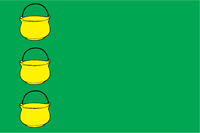
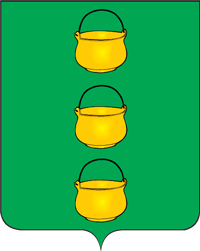
- Flag Coat of arms
- Interactive map of Kotelniki
- Location of Kotelniki Kotelniki (European Russia) Kotelniki (Europe)
- Coordinates: 55°39′42″N 37°52′02″E
- Country: Russia
- Federal subject: Moscow Oblast
- First mentioned: 17th century
- Town status since: 2004
- Elevation: 140 m (460 ft)

Population (2010 Census)
  - Total: 32,338
  - Estimate (2025): 75,289 (+132.8%)

Administrative status
  - Subordinated to: Kotelniki Town Under Oblast Jurisdiction
  - Capital of: Kotelniki Town Under Oblast Jurisdiction

Municipal status
  - Urban okrug: Kotelniki Urban Okrug
  - Capital of: Kotelniki Urban Okrug
- Time zone: UTC+3 (MSK)
- Postal code: 140053–140056
- OKTMO ID: 46739000001

Kotelniki (Russian: Котельники) is a town of Moscow Oblast, Russia, located 22 km (14 mi) southeast of the center of Moscow. Population: 63,728 (2021 census); 32,338 (2010 census); 17,747 (2002 census); 17,456 (1989 Soviet census).

== History ==
The village of Kotelniki was first mentioned in the 17th century and belonged to Golitsyns in the 19th century. It was granted town status in 2004.

On August 20, 2021, Russian security forces raided a mosque in the region and arrested up to 600 people. They were released later without any explanation as to the cause for the raid. Non-Russian Muslims were released after their DNA was collected.

On July 7, 2023, an anti-Ukrainian far-right Russian Community telegram channel spoke out against the presence of Muslims prayer houses in the area leading to security forces raiding a prayer house on the pretext of finding illegal immigrants.

== Administrative and municipal status ==
Within the framework of administrative divisions, it is incorporated as Kotelniki Town Under Oblast Jurisdiction—an administrative unit with the status equal to that of the districts. As a municipal division, Kotelniki Town Under Oblast Jurisdiction is incorporated as Kotelniki Urban Okrug.

== Economy ==
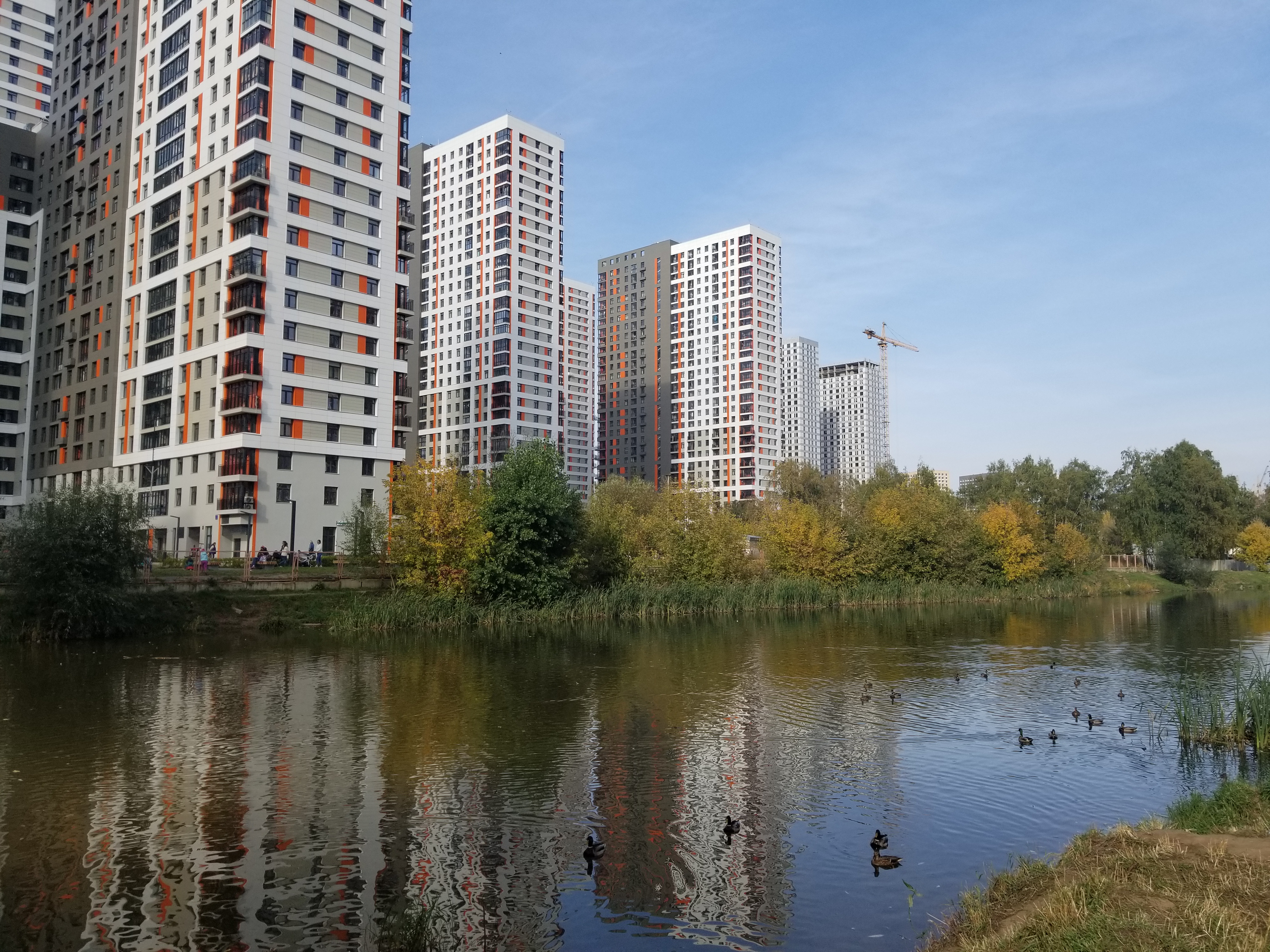
Residential complex Orange Park by PIK Group at Kotelniki metro station.

=== Transportation ===
Kotelniki metro station, the terminus of the Moscow Metro's Tagansko-Krasnopresnenskaya Line, is located in the city. It was opened on 21 September 2015 and became the second station of the Moscow Metro in Moscow Oblast after Myakinino.

== Notable people ==
- Nikolay Abramov (born 1950), football player

== Gallery ==
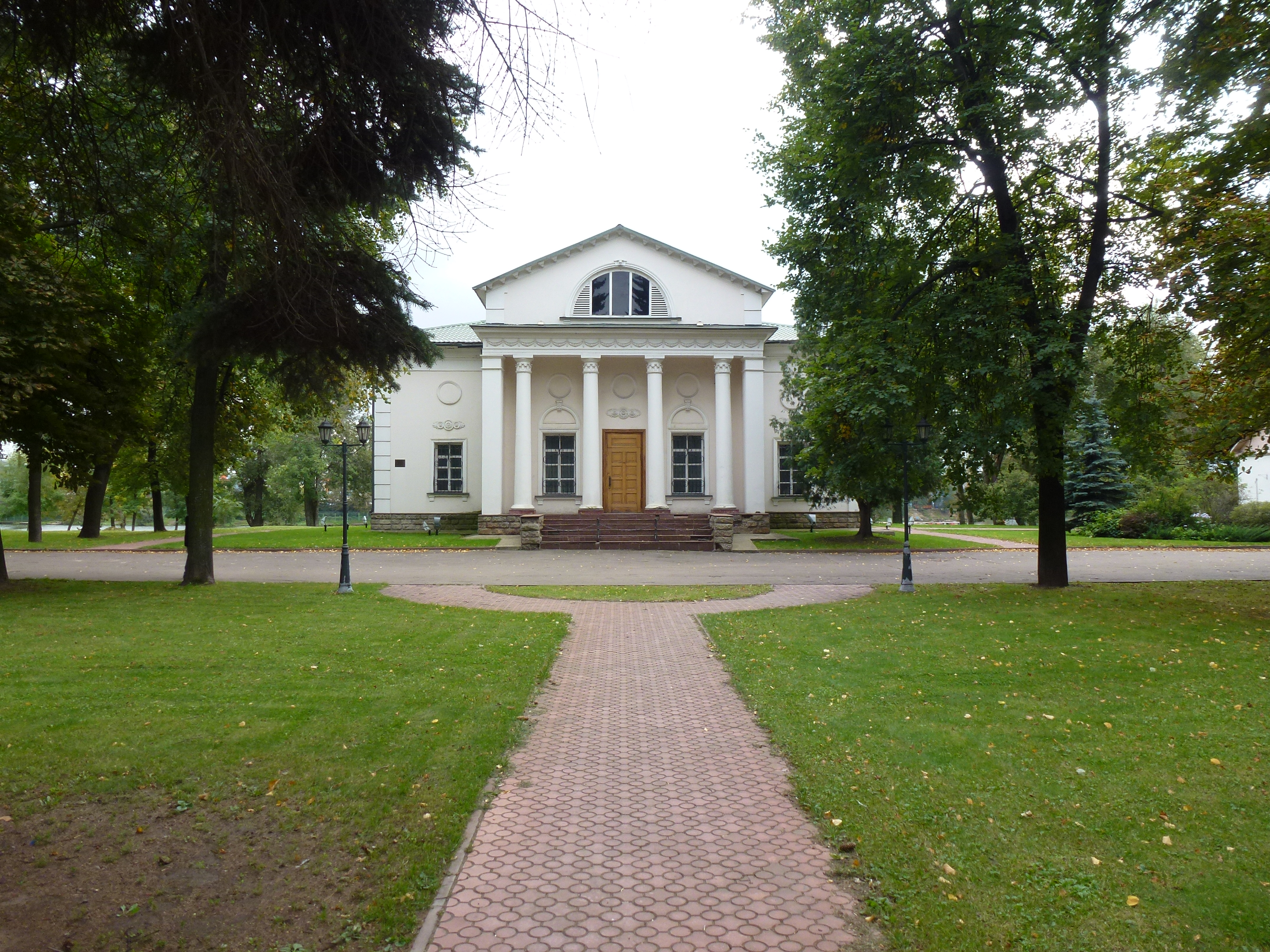
Belaya Dacha estate

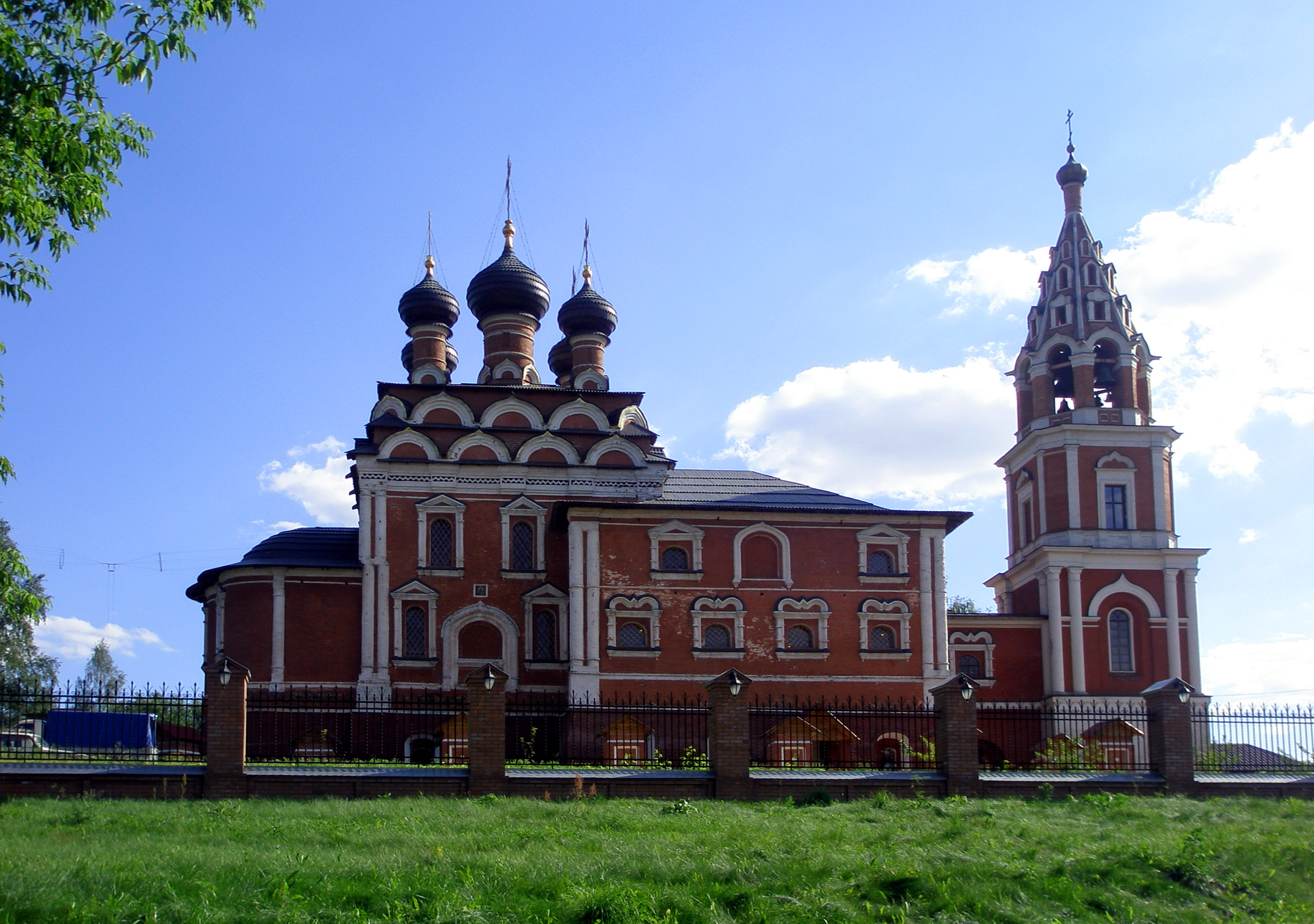
Church of the Theotokos of Kazan

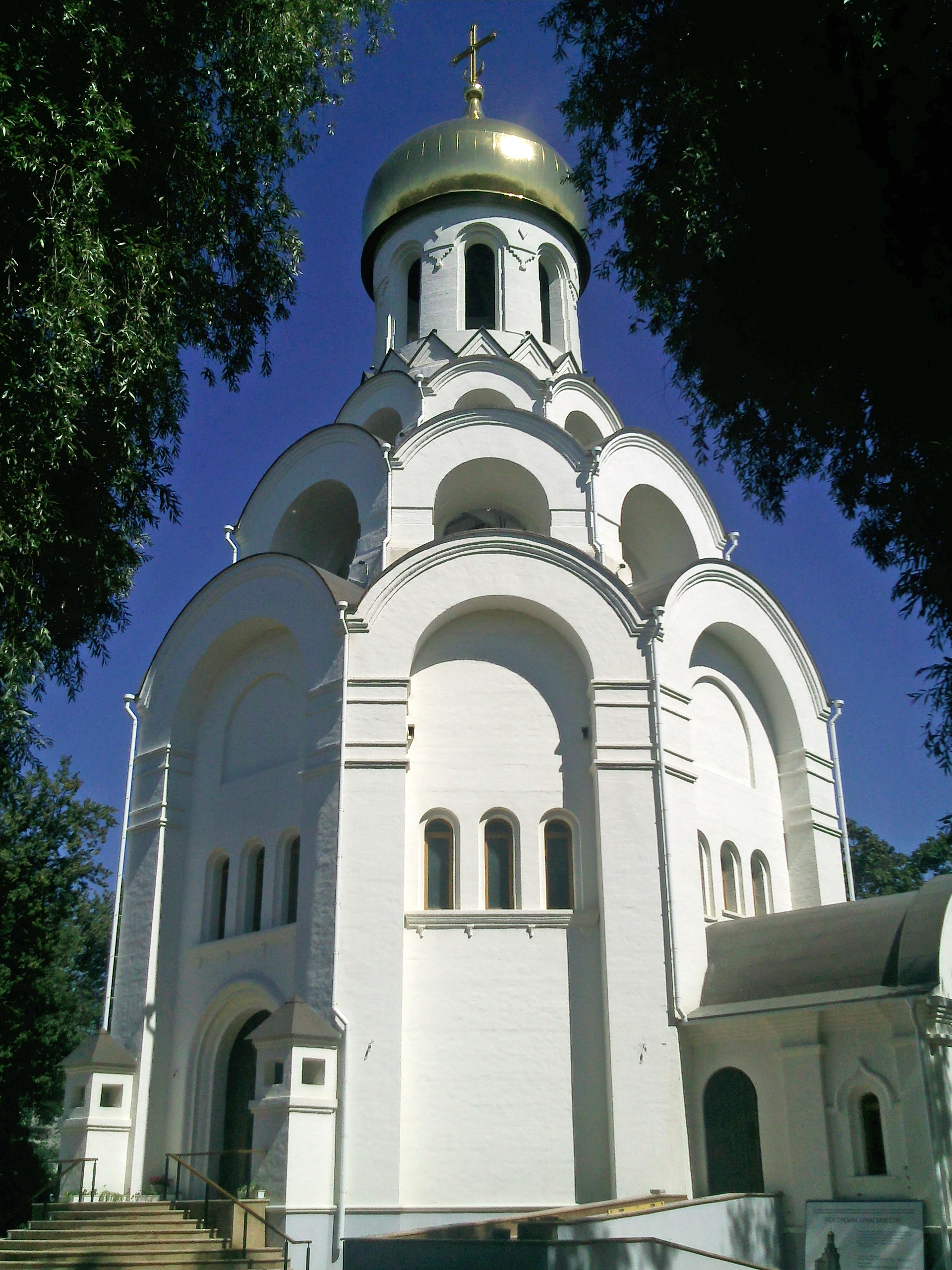
Temple of Martyr Victor of Damascus
