= Boris Ivanyuzhenkov =

Russian politician (born 1966)

Boris Ivanyuzhenkov MP
- Борис Иванюженков
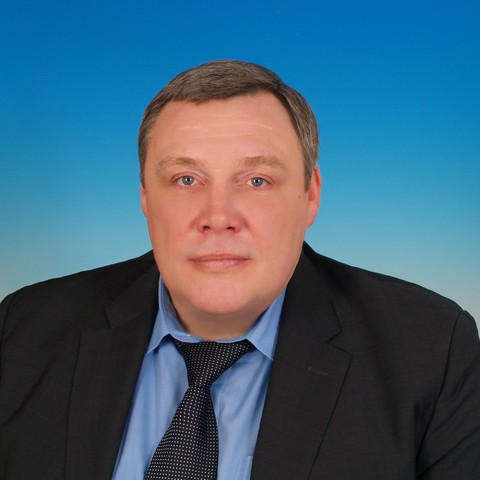

Member of the State Duma (Party List Seat)
- Incumbent
- Assumed office 5 February 2020
- Preceded by: Mikhail Avdeev
- In office 21 December 2011 – 5 October 2016

Personal details
- Born: 25 February 1966 (age 60) Reutov, Moscow Oblast, Russian SFSR, USSR
- Party: Communist Party of the Russian Federation
- Spouse: Natalya Ivanyuzhenkova
- Children: Anton; Artyom; Anastasia
- Education: Moscow State Academy of Physical Culture; Moscow State Law Academy
- Occupation: coach; sports organiser

Boris Victorovich Ivanyuzhenkov (Note: His patrynomic is also transliterated as Viktorovych) (Russian: Борис Викторович Иванюженков; born 25 February 1966) is a Russian political figure and a deputy of the 8th State Duma.

At the age of 15, Ivanyuzhenkov started to engage in Greco-Roman wrestling. He is a Master of Sport in Greco-Roman wrestling, a multiple winner and winner of international and Russian tournaments. From 1984 to 1986, he served in the Soviet Armed Forces. In 1996, he was elected vice president of the Russian Wrestling Federation. The same year, he became a member of the Russian Olympic Committee. From 1997 to 1999, he became a deputy of the Moscow Oblast Duma of the 2nd convocation. On 24 June 1999, he left the post to become the Minister of Sport. From 2006 to 2021, he was the vice president of the Russian Paralympic Committee. He left the post in March 2021 due to the sanctions introduced by the World Anti-Doping Agency that prohibited Russian government officials from holding leadership positions in sports federations. In 2011, he was elected deputy of the 6th State Duma. In 2016, Ivanyuzhenkov participated in the election for the 7th State Duma but was not elected. However, in 2019, he received vacated mandate after the death of Zhores Alferov. In 2021, he was re-elected for the 7th, and 8th State Dumas.

According to The Insider, in the 1990s, Ivanyuzhenkov was a member of one of the largest organized crime groups in Russia titled "Podolsk criminal group" and appeared in old crime chronicles as "Rotan".

During his time at the 7th State Duma, he did not say a single word even though, according to the official records, he attended all the meetings.

== Criminal activity ==
He was part of the leadership group of the Podolsk organized crime syndicate, led by Sergey Lalakin, one of the most powerful criminal organizations in Russia during the 1990s. He was known by the nickname “Rotan.” Ivanyuzhenkov admitted to having had legal issues in the past, including being charged in 1989 and 1992 with rape and illegal possession of weapons, respectively. However, he denied any involvement with organized crime, stating instead that he knew Lalakin well as a former classmate from vocational school.

== Sanctions ==
He was sanctioned by the UK government in 2022 in relation to the Russo-Ukrainian War.

== Awards ==
- Order "For Merit to the Fatherland"
