= Vidnoye, Moscow Oblast =

City in Moscow Oblast, Russia

Vidnoye Видное
- City
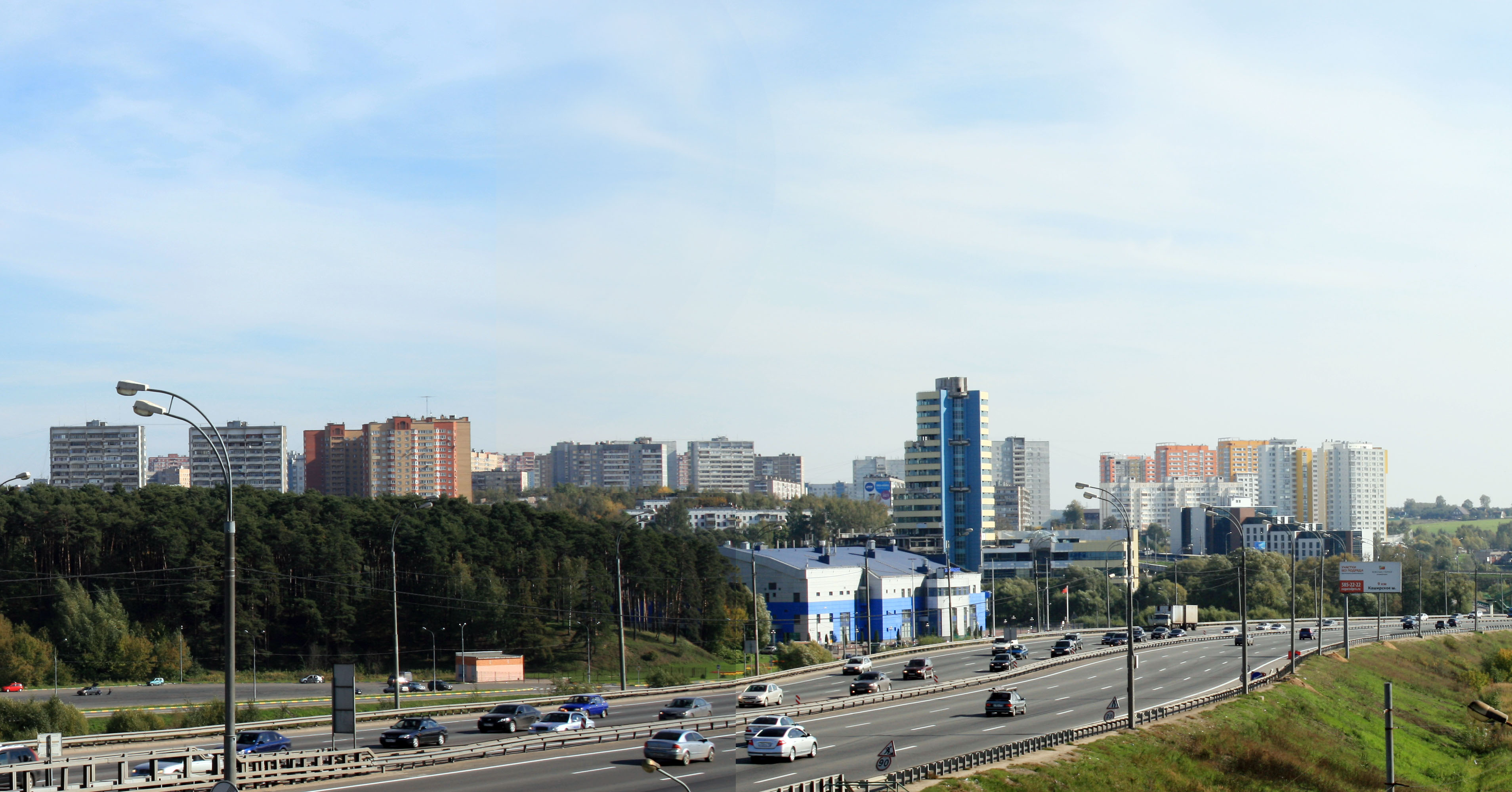
- View of Vidnoye

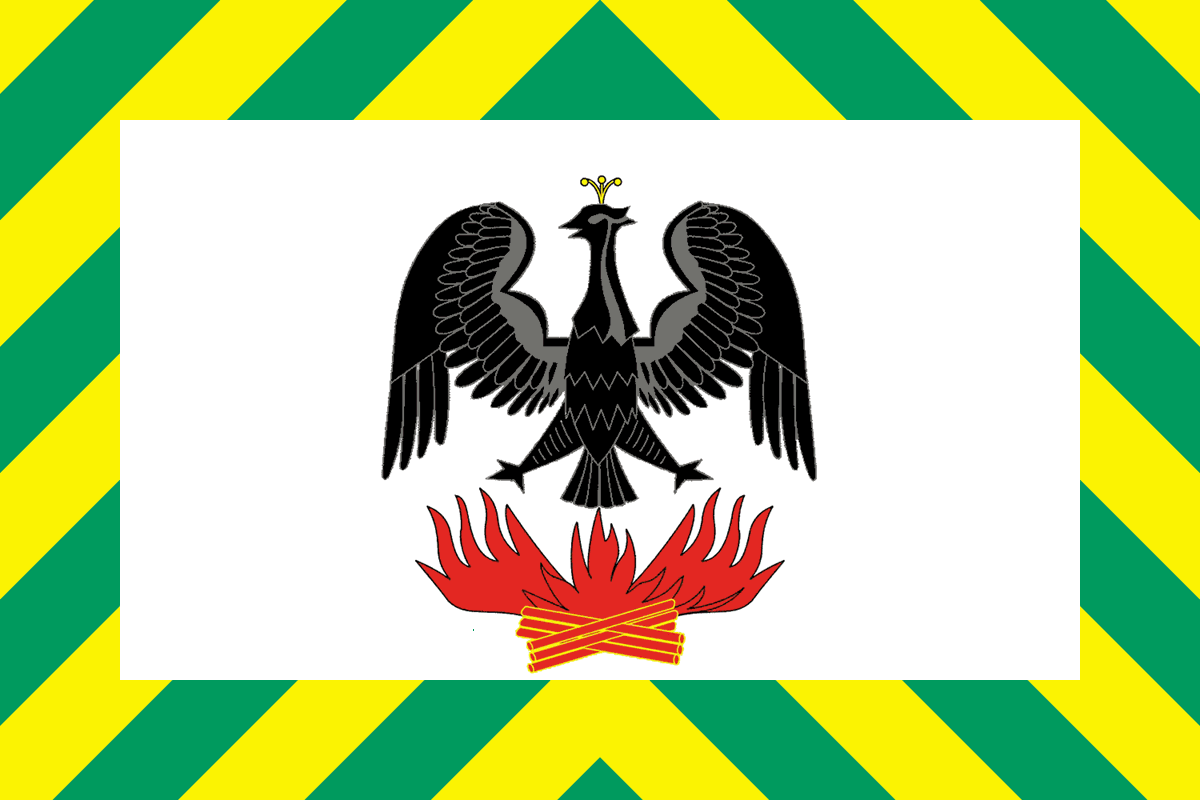
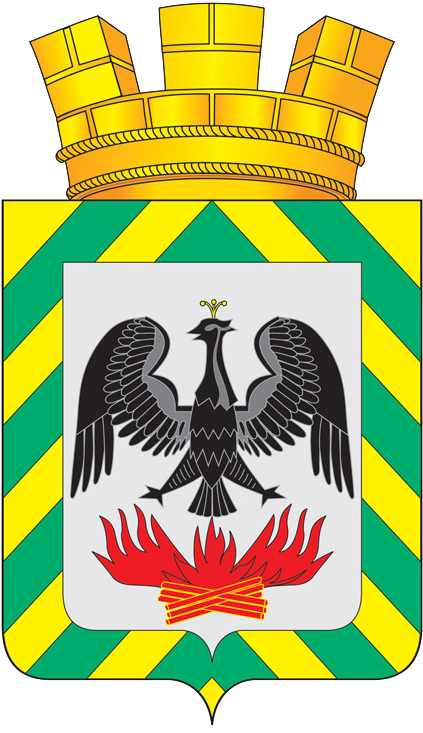
- Flag Coat of arms
- Interactive map of Vidnoye
- Location of Vidnoye Vidnoye (Moscow Oblast)
- Coordinates: 55°33′N 37°43′E
- Country: Russia
- Federal subject: Moscow Oblast
- Administrative district: Leninsky District
- CitySelsoviet: Vidnoye
- Founded: 1949
- City status since: 1965
- Elevation: 160 m (520 ft)

Population (2010 Census)
  - Total: 56,752
  - Estimate (2025): 108,683 (+91.5%)
  - Rank: 290th in 2010

Administrative status
  - Capital of: Leninsky District, City of Vidnoye

Municipal status
  - Municipal district: Leninsky Municipal District
  - Urban settlement: Vidnoye Urban Settlement
  - Capital of: Leninsky Municipal District, Vidnoye Urban Settlement
- Time zone: UTC+3 (MSK)
- Postal codes: 142700–142705, 142708
- OKTMO ID: 46707000001
- Website: adm-vidnoe.ru

Vidnoye (Russian: Ви́дное, IPA: [ˈvʲidnəjə]) is a city and the administrative center of Leninsky District in Moscow Oblast, Russia, located 3 kilometers (1.9 mi) south of Moscow city limits. Population: 101,490 (2021 census); 56,752 (2010 census); 52,198 (2002 census); 55,829 (1989 Soviet census).

== History ==
Rastorguyevo summer cottage community was established in this area in 1902. The construction of the Moscow Coke and Gas Works factory started in 1937 but was interrupted by World War II, and it was only in 1949 that the settlement of Vidnoye was established for the factory workers. Vidnoye was merged with Rastorguyevo and granted town status in 1965.

== Administrative and municipal status ==
Within the framework of administrative divisions, Vidnoye serves as the administrative center of Leninsky District. As an administrative division, it is, together with seven rural localities, incorporated within Leninsky District as the Town of Vidnoye. As a municipal division, the Town of Vidnoye is incorporated within Leninsky Municipal District as Vidnoye Urban Settlement.

== Economy ==
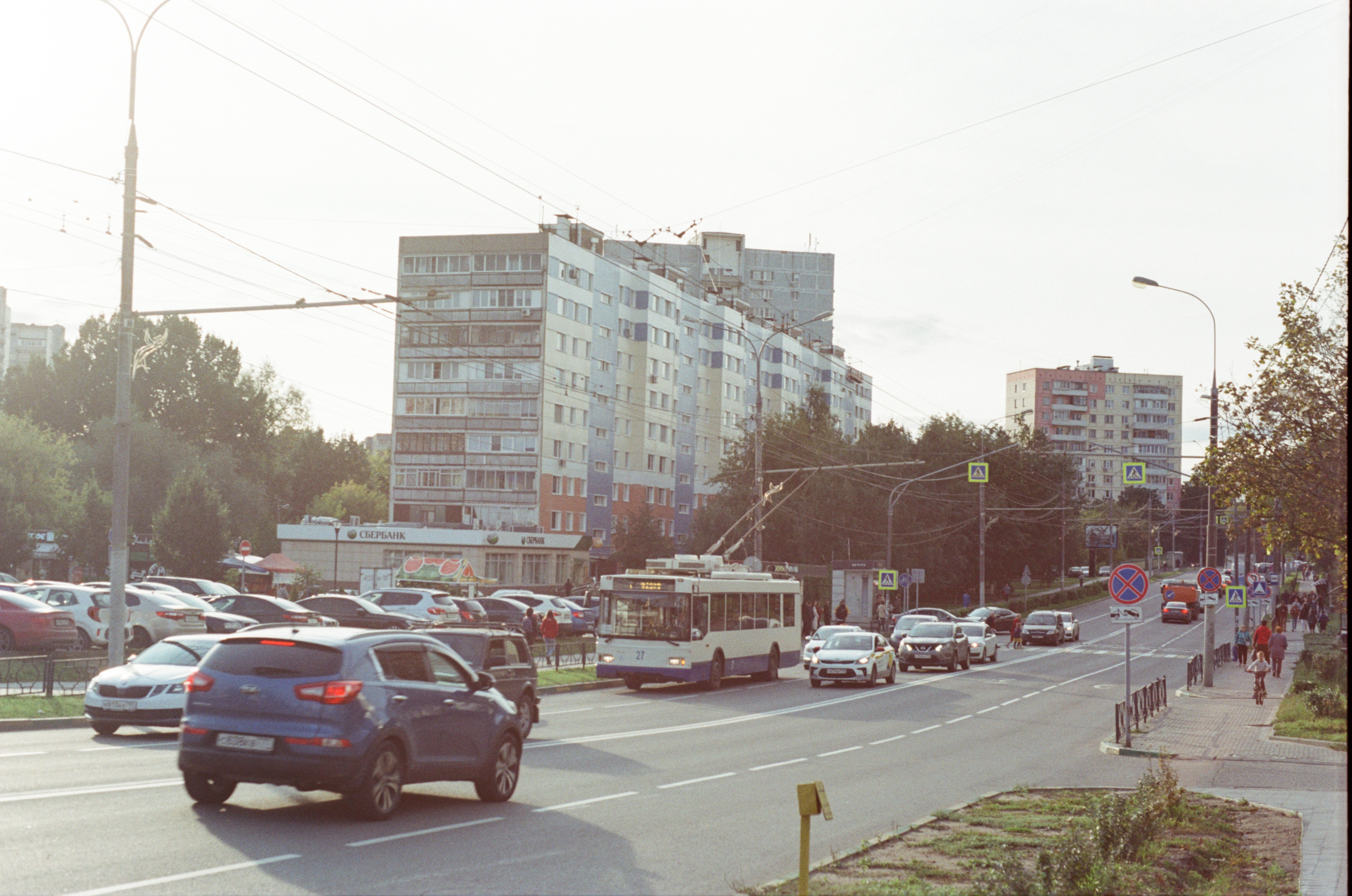
A trolleybus in Vidnoye

Main industrial enterprises in Vidnoye include the Moscow Coke and Gas Works, the Metallist factory, and the Gipsobeton company. Public transportation is represented by commuter trains to Moscow (Rastorguyevo railway station of the Pavelets Line) and eight bus lines. Several trolleybus lines were put into operation during the first decade of the 2000s.

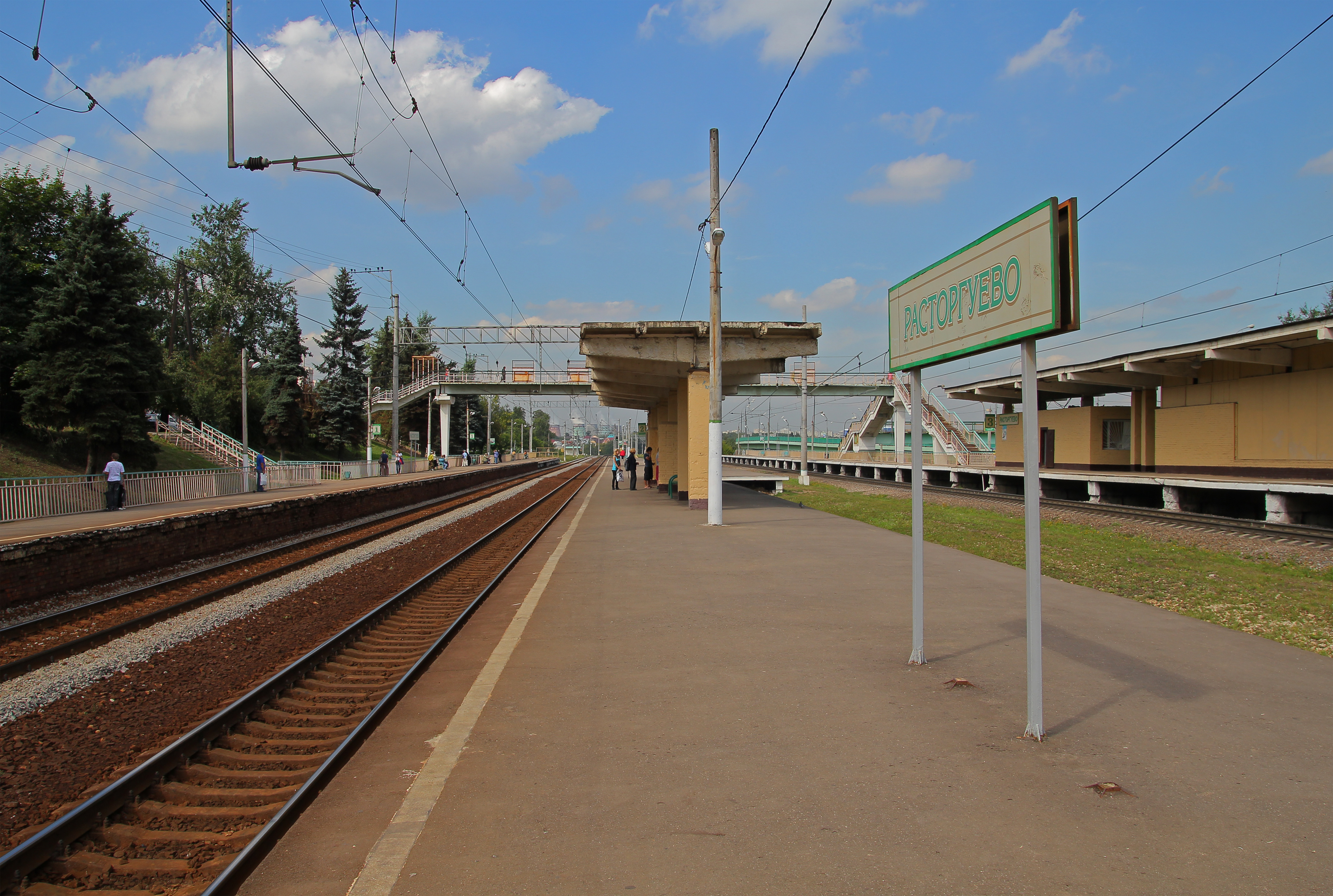
Rastorguyevo railway station in Vidnoye

== Culture ==
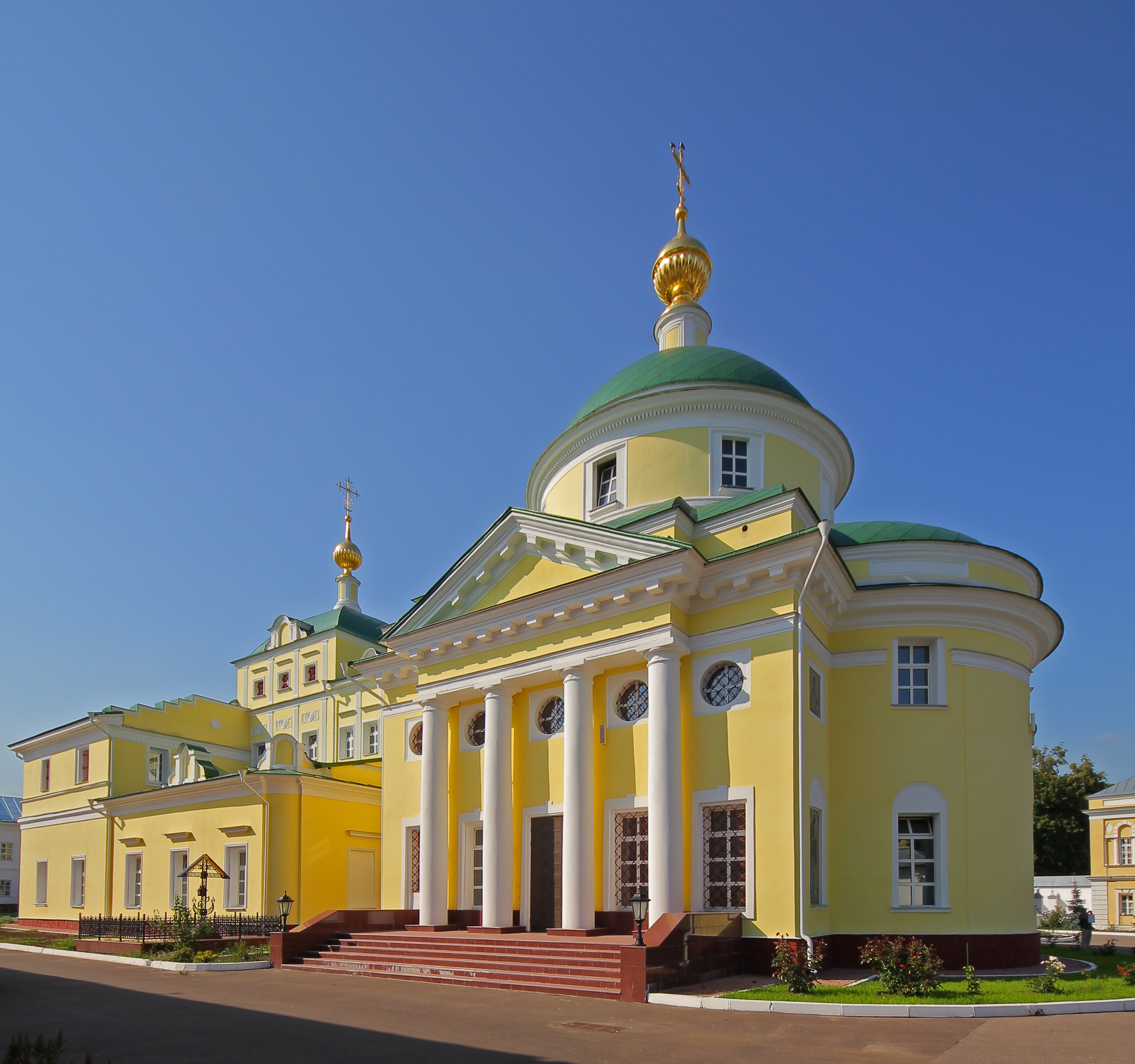
St. Catherine's monastery

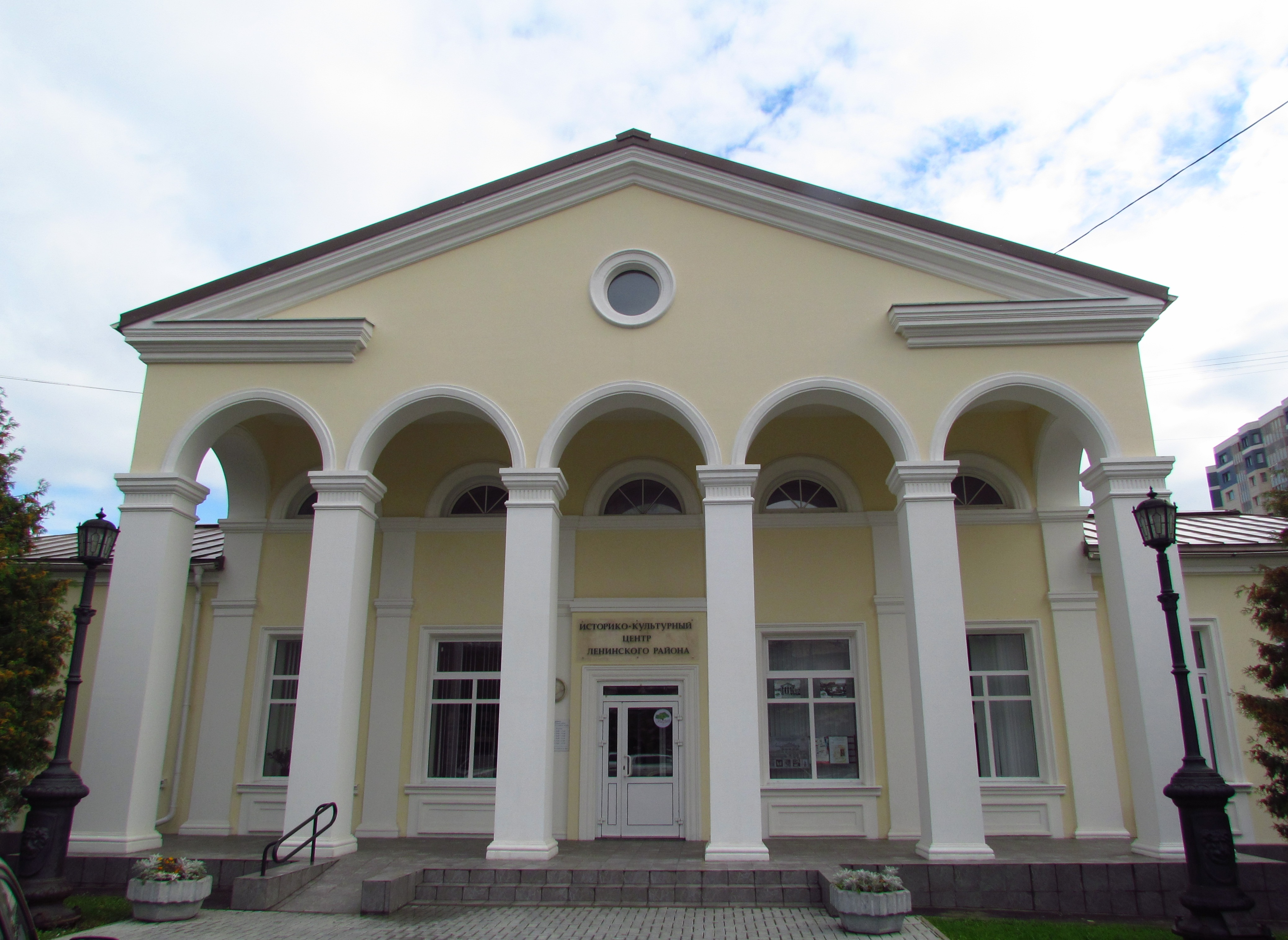
Leninskiy District Historical and Cultural Center

- St. Catherine's monastery
- Soviet Square and Leninskiy District Historical and Cultural Center

== Media ==
Vidnovskiye Vesti, established in 1931, is the local newspaper. One local cable TV station (Vidnoye-TV) broadcasts in the city.

== Sports ==
There are several sports arenas in the city: Vidnoye sports palace, Metallurg ice stadium, a motoball stadium, and a swimming pool. There are several sport clubs for teenagers.

=== Basketball ===
Women's Basketball Club Spartak Moscow Oblast is a women's basketball team based in Vidnoye that plays in FIBA's EuroLeague Women. It is a highly successful team in recent years, winning the 2005-2006 EuroCup Women and the 2006–2007, 2007–2008, 2008–2009 and 2009-2010 EuroLeague Women championship and the inaugural SuperCup Women.

=== Motoball (Motorcycle Polo) ===
Vidnoye is hometown of Metallurg motoball team. Three European championships took place in Vidnoye (in 1992, 1998, and 2006), in all of which team Russia was the winner.

== Notable people ==
- Association football goalkeeper Igor Akinfeev was born in Vidnoye.
- Nike Borzov - popular Russian singer and musician - was born in Vidnoye

== Twin towns and sister cities ==
Vidnoye is twinned with:

- Glyfada, Attica, Greece
- Kant, Chüy Region, Kyrgyzstan
- Nuwara Eliya, Central Province, Sri Lanka
- Shaoshan, Hunan, China
- Tuusula, Uusimaa, Finland
