= Kolomna constituency =

Legislative constituency in Russia

Kolomna single-member constituency
- Constituency of the Russian State Duma
- Deputy: Nikita Chaplin; United Russia
- Federal subject: Moscow Oblast
- Districts: Kashira, Kolomna, Lukhovitsy, Ramensky (Kuznetsovskoye, Rybolovskoye, Ulyaninskoye, Zabolotyevskoye), Serebryanye Prudy, Zaraysk
- Voters: 455,766 (2026)

The Kolomna constituency (No.120 (Note: No.107 in 1993-1995 and 2003-2007, No.106 in 1995-2003, No.119 in 2016–2026)) is a Russian legislative constituency in Moscow Oblast. The constituency covers south-eastern Moscow Oblast.

The constituency has been represented since 2021 by United Russia deputy Nikita Chaplin, former First Deputy Chairman of the Moscow Oblast Duma and son of former Senator Yury Chaplin, who won the open seat, succeeding one-term United Russia incumbent Yelena Serova, after the latter unsuccessfully sought re-election only through party-list representation.

== Boundaries ==
1993–1995: Kashira, Kashirsky District, Kolomensky District, Kolomna, Lukhovitsky District, Ozyory, Ozyorsky District, Serebryano-Prudsky District, Stupino, Stupinsky District, Yegoryevsk, Yegoryevsky District, Zaraysk, Zaraysky District
The constituency covered south-eastern Moscow Oblast, including the cities Kashira, Kolomna, Ozyory, Stupino, Yegoryevsk and Zaraysk.

1995–2007: Kashirsky District, Kolomensky District, Kolomna, Lukhovitsky District, Ozyorsky District, Serebryano-Prudsky District, Voskresensky District, Zaraysky District
The constituency was significantly altered following the 1995 redistricting, losing Stupinsky District to Serpukhov constituency and Yegoryevsky District to Orekhovo-Zuyevo constituency. This seat instead gained Voskresensky District to its north from Orekhovo-Zuyevo constituency.

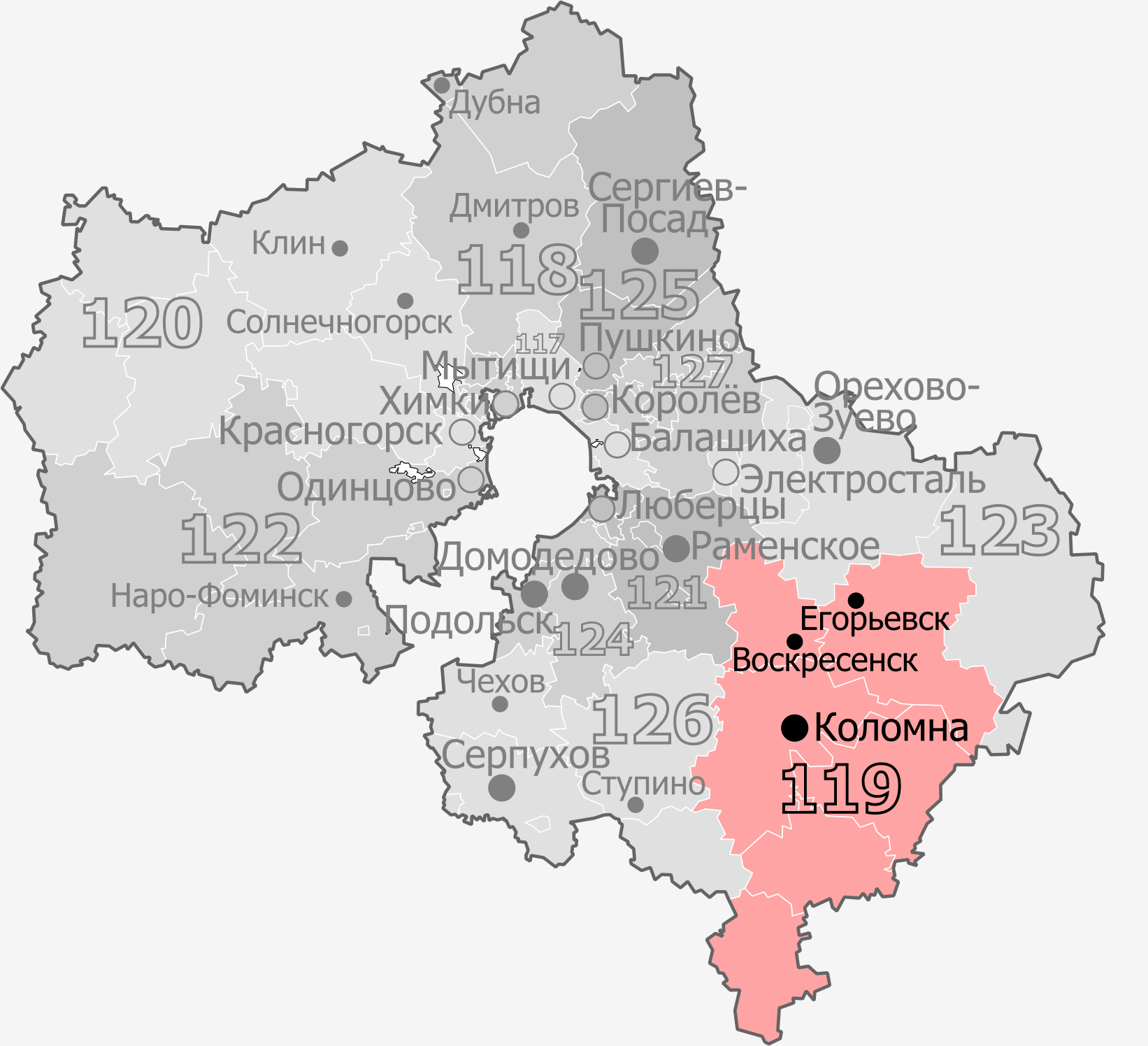
Constituency boundaries from 2016 to 2026

2016–2026: Kolomensky District, Kolomna, Lukhovitsy, Serebryanye Prudy, Voskresensk, Yegoryevsk, Zaraysk
The constituency was re-created for the 2016 election and retained almost all of its former territory, except for Kashirsky District which was ceded to Serpukhov constituency. This seat gained Yegoryevsky District from the former Orekhovo-Zuyevo constituency.

2026–present: Kashira, Kolomna, Lukhovitsy, Ramensky District (Kuznetsovskoye, Rybolovskoye, Ulyaninskoye, Zabolotyevskoye), Serebryanye Prudy, Zaraysk
After the 2025 redistricting the constituency was changed, regaining Kashirsky District and again losing Yegoryevsky District. The constituency also gained western edges of Ramensky District from Lyubertsy constituency.

== Members elected ==
Election	Member	Party
1993	Sergey Skorochkin (Note: killed in February 1995)	Independent
1995	German Titov (Note: died in September 2000)	Independent
1995	German Titov	Communist Party
1999	German Titov	Communist Party
2001	Gennady Gudkov	Independent
2003	Gennady Gudkov	People's Party
2007	Proportional representation - no election by constituency	
2011	Proportional representation - no election by constituency	
2016	Yelena Serova	United Russia
2021	Nikita Chaplin	United Russia
2026	Nikita Chaplin	United Russia

== Election results ==
=== 1993 ===
Summary of the 12 December 1993 Russian legislative election in the Kolomna constituency
Candidate	Party	Votes	%
Sergey Skorochkin	Independent	64,587	21.84%
Stanislav Zhebrovsky	Liberal Democratic Party	42,427	14.35%
Anatoly Yermakov	Independent	36,120	12.22%
Valentin Kornilov	Agrarian Party	22,690	7.67%
Vladimir Prokofyev	Independent	20,764	7.02%
Vladimir Nosov	Independent	19,181	6.49%
Aleksey Lintsov	Democratic Party	10,088	3.41%
Nikolay Zhirov	Russian Democratic Reform Movement	9,532	3.22%
against all		50,674	17.14%
Total		295,682	100%

=== 1995 by-election ===
Summary of the 14 May 1995 by-election in the Kolomna constituency
Candidate	Party	Votes	% (Note: % of registered voters)
German Titov	Independent	44,000	8.5%
Mikhail Guberman	Independent	38,000	7.3%
Yelena Mavrodi	Independent	26,500	5.08%
Stanislav Terekhov	Independent	23,000	4.43%
Aleksey Vedenkin	Independent	–	<4%
Total		–	100%

=== 1995 ===
Summary of the 17 December 1995 Russian legislative election in the Kolomna constituency
Candidate	Party	Votes	%
German Titov (incumbent)	Communist Party	99,540	31.79%
Mikhail Guberman	Trade Unions and Industrialists – Union of Labour	34,457	11.00%
Oleg Kovalyov	Our Home – Russia	34,027	10.87%
Mikhail Perchenko	Independent	19,267	6.15%
Aleksandr Surkov	Power to the People	16,312	5.21%
Viktor Yenshin	Liberal Democratic Party	10,011	3.20%
Mikhail Galkin	Kedr	8,207	2.62%
Valery Podguzov	Independent	7,916	2.53%
Raisa Baydikova	Forward, Russia!	7,162	2.29%
Svetlana Volkova	Party of Tax Cuts' Supporters	7,159	2.29%
Yury Pankratov	Congress of Russian Communities	7,130	2.28%
Aleksandr Zotov	Duma-96	6,729	2.15%
Nikolay Pankratov	Pamfilova–Gurov–Lysenko	6,622	2.11%
Aleksandr Razumov	For the Motherland!	6,304	2.01%
Pavel Filippov	Party of Russian Unity and Accord	2,435	0.78%
Aleksandr Kukharenko	Our Future	1,891	0.60%
Vladimir Konovalov	People's Union	1,057	0.34%
against all		28,032	8.95%
Total		313,159	100%

=== 1999 ===
Summary of the 19 December 1999 Russian legislative election in the Kolomna constituency
Candidate	Party	Votes	%
German Titov (incumbent)	Communist Party	62,117	20.32%
Gennady Gudkov	Independent	50,587	16.55%
Vasily Semayev	Fatherland – All Russia	38,222	12.51%
Oleg Krasnykh	Independent	26,280	8.60%
Aleksey Zakharov	Yabloko	21,864	7.15%
Natalya Yermakova	Andrey Nikolayev and Svyatoslav Fyodorov Bloc	17,610	5.76%
Vladimir Andreyev	Independent	15,286	5.00%
Aleksandr Bazhenov	Russian Cause	7,542	2.47%
Aleksandr Kukharenko	Stalin Bloc – For the USSR	5,025	1.64%
Anatoly Saunin	Independent	4,246	1.39%
Yury Nedelin	Spiritual Heritage	1,435	0.47%
against all		45,727	14.96%
Total		305,638	100%

=== 2001 ===
Summary of the 18 March 2001 by-election in the Kolomna constituency
Candidate	Party	Votes	%
Gennady Gudkov	Independent	65,074	43.96%
Viktor Anpilov	Independent	19,183	12.96%
Aleksandr Korolev	Independent	13,363	9.03%
Nina Veselova	Independent	9,014	6.09%
Yevgeny Loginov	Independent	5,797	3.92%
Igor Volk	Independent	5,512	3.72%
Stanislav Terekhov	Independent	4,286	2.90%
Tadeush Kasyanov	Independent	3,236	2.19%
Oleg Borodin	Independent	1,866	1.26%
Viktor Kuleshov	Independent	1,284	0.87%
against all		16,119	10.89%
Total		148,044	100%

=== 2003 ===
Summary of the 7 December 2003 Russian legislative election in the Kolomna constituency
Candidate	Party	Votes	%
Gennady Gudkov (incumbent)	People's Party	130,258	46.97%
Vladimir Kashin	Communist Party	47,352	17.08%
Aleksandr Kukharenko	Independent	13,772	4.97%
Aleksandr Korolev	Independent	12,033	4.34%
Vladimir Kuleshov	Liberal Democratic Party	6,192	2.23%
Elvira Kotova	United Russian Party Rus'	5,528	1.99%
Aleksey Vashchenko	Independent	5,196	1.87%
Aleksandr Artsibashev	Agrarian Party	4,071	1.47%
against all		45,923	16.56%
Total		277,789	100%

=== 2016 ===
Summary of the 18 September 2016 Russian legislative election in the Kolomna constituency
Candidate	Party	Votes	%
Yelena Serova	United Russia	84,682	47.96%
Vitaly Fedorov	Communist Party	21,600	12.23%
Yury Bezler	Liberal Democratic Party	19,735	11.18%
Semyon Bagdasarov	A Just Russia	16,858	9.55%
Igor Chernyshov	Communists of Russia	7,885	4.47%
Dmitry Baranovsky	The Greens	6,630	3.75%
Sergey Karlov	Party of Growth	5,135	2.91%
Oleg Osipov	Rodina	4,034	2.28%
Total		176,584	100%

=== 2021 ===
Summary of the 17-19 September 2021 Russian legislative election in the Kolomna constituency
Candidate	Party	Votes	%
Nikita Chaplin	United Russia	101,598	46.70%
Dmitry Kononenko	Communist Party	36,346	16.71%
Maria Semenova	A Just Russia — For Truth	15,324	7.04%
Aleksandr Kurguzov	Party of Pensioners	12,010	5.52%
Konstantin Musin	Liberal Democratic Party	11,789	5.42%
Ruslan Anchurov	New People	10,439	4.80%
Nadezhda Yelkina	Party of Growth	4,872	2.24%
Tatyana Filimonova	Green Alternative	4,087	1.88%
Viktor Dulin	Yabloko	4,085	1.88%
Yevgeny Gvozdik	The Greens	3,487	1.60%
Aleksey Meshchersky	Rodina	2,537	1.17%
Total		217,575	100%

=== 2026 ===
Summary of the 18-20 September 2026 Russian legislative election in the Kolomna constituency
Candidate	Party	Votes	%
Nikita Chaplin (incumbent)	United Russia	134,599	56.11%
Sergey Streltsov	Communist Party	28,651	11.94%
Irina Timkova	New People	26,284	10.96%
Konstantin Musin	Liberal Democratic Party	21,914	9.14%
Vladimir Konkin	A Just Russia	15,352	6.40%
Dmitry Gelevera	The Greens	8,504	3.55%
Total		239,887	100%
