= Orekhovo-Zuyevo constituency =

Legislative constituency in Russia

Orekhovo-Zuyevo single-member constituency
- Constituency of the Russian State Duma
- Deputy: Gennady Panin; United Russia
- Federal subject: Moscow Oblast
- Districts: Elektrostal, Orekhovo-Zuyevo, Pavlovsky Posad, Shatura, Yegoryevsk
- Voters: 511,812 (2026)

The Orekhovo-Zuyevo constituency (No.125 (Note: No.112 in 1993-1995 and 2003-2007, No.111 in 1995-2003, No.123 in 2016–2026)) is a Russian legislative constituency in Moscow Oblast. The constituency covers north-eastern Moscow Oblast.

The constituency has been represented since 2021 by United Russia deputy Gennady Panin, former Mayor of Orekhovo-Zuyevo, who won the open seat, succeeding three-term United Russia incumbent Valentina Kabanova.

== Boundaries ==
1993–1995: Orekhovo-Zuyevo, Orekhovo-Zuyevsky District, Pavlovsky Posad, Pavlovo-Posadsky District, Shatura, Shatursky District, Voskresensk, Voskresensky District
The constituency covered eastern and north-eastern Moscow Oblast, including major manufacturing cities Orekhovo-Zuyevo, Pavlovsky Posad, Shatura and Voskresensk.

1995–2007: Elektrogorsk, Orekhovo-Zuyevo, Orekhovo-Zuyevsky District, Pavlovo-Posadsky District, Roshal, Shatursky District, Yegoryevsky District
The constituency was slightly altered following the 1995 redistricting, swapping Voskresensk for Yegoryevsk with Kolomna constituency.

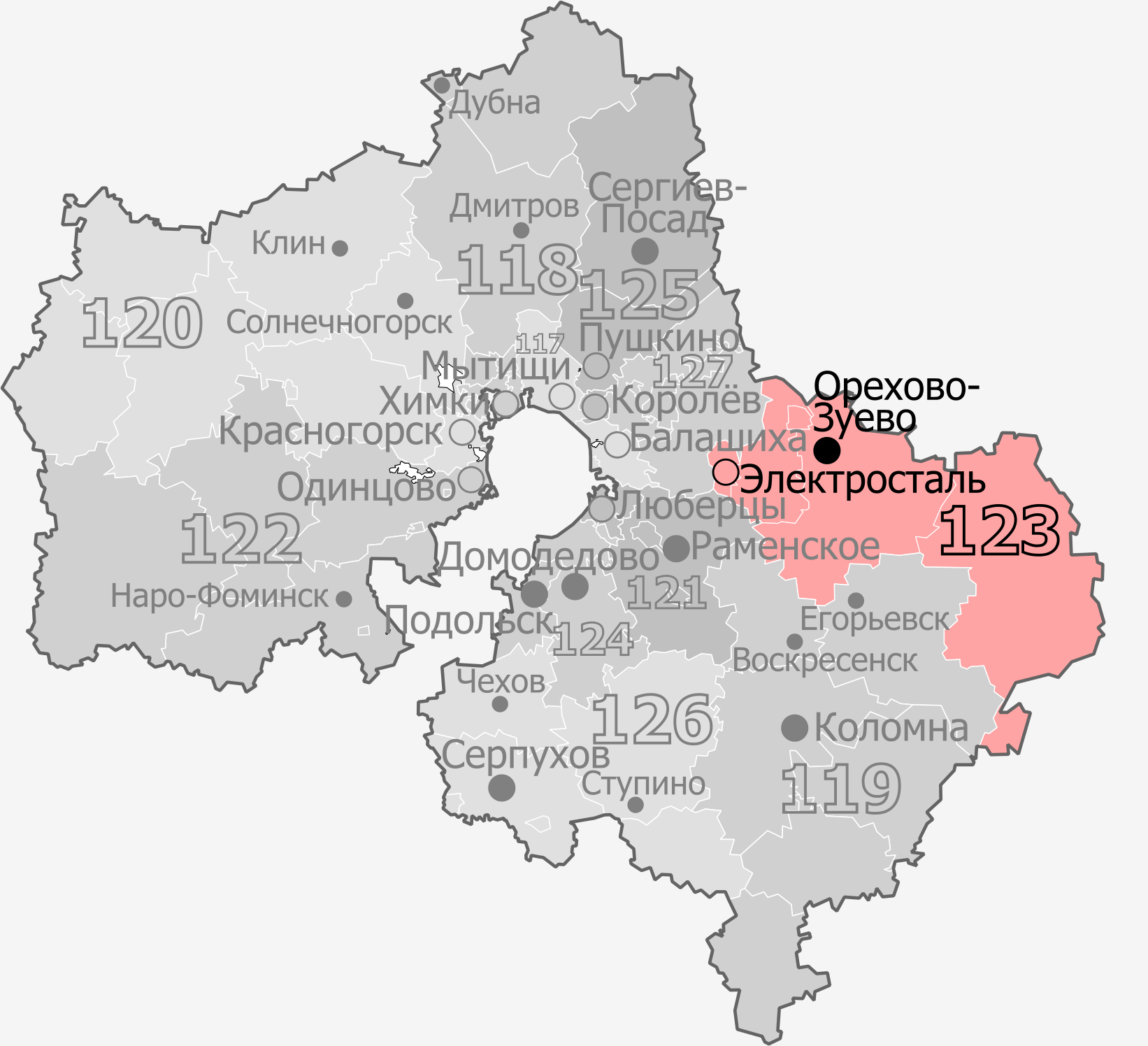
Constituency boundaries from 2016 to 2026

2016–2026: Elektrogorsk, Elektrostal, Orekhovo-Zuyevo, Pavlovo-Posadsky District, Roshal, Shatursky District
The constituency was re-created for the 2016 election and retained almost all of its former territory, only losing Yegoryevsky District to Kolomna constituency. This seat instead gained the industrial city Elektrostal from the former Noginsk constituency.

2026–present: Elektrostal, Orekhovo-Zuyevo, Pavlovsky Posad, Shatura, Yegoryevsk
After the 2025 redistricting the constituency was slightly changed, re-gaining Yegoryevsk from Kolomna constituency.

== Members elected ==
Election	Member	Party
1993	Vladimir Kvasov	Independent
1995	Vladimir Bryntsalov	Ivan Rybkin Bloc
1999	Vladimir Bryntsalov	Russian Socialist Party
2003	Sergey Sobko	Communist Party
2007	Proportional representation - no election by constituency	
2011	Proportional representation - no election by constituency	
2016	Valentina Kabanova	United Russia
2021	Gennady Panin	United Russia
2026	Gennady Panin	United Russia

== Election results ==
=== 1993 ===
Summary of the 12 December 1993 Russian legislative election in the Orekhovo-Zuyevo constituency
Candidate	Party	Votes	%
Vladimir Kvasov	Independent	74,481	26.70%
Vladimir Bryntsalov	Independent	56,942	20.42%
Sergey Tolmachev	Civic Union	23,266	8.34%
Nina Semenenko	Independent	21,171	7.59%
Sergey Glebov	Liberal Democratic Party	14,290	5.12%
Yevgeny Lysenko	Communist Party	10,953	3.93%
Sergey Baydin	Choice of Russia	6,638	2.38%
Ivan Yesin	Agrarian Party	4,606	1.65%
against all		45,842	16.44%
Total		278,920	100%

=== 1995 ===
Summary of the 17 December 1995 Russian legislative election in the Orekhovo-Zuyevo constituency
Candidate	Party	Votes	%
Vladimir Bryntsalov	Ivan Rybkin Bloc	75,266	25.65%
Yury Ivanov	Communist Party	51,724	17.63%
Vladimir Kvasov (incumbent)	Trade Unions and Industrialists – Union of Labour	35,284	12.03%
Anatoly Vetlov	Independent	28,695	9.78%
Aleksandr Kondrashov	Congress of Russian Communities	17,306	5.90%
Sergey Khlebnikov	Liberal Democratic Party	16,713	5.70%
Sergey Sobko	Christian-Democratic Union — Christians of Russia	10,130	3.45%
Yelena Varfolomeyeva	Power to the People	7,479	2.55%
Sergey Kostylev	Independent	6,662	2.27%
against all		33,651	11.47%
Total		293,395	100%

=== 1999 ===
Summary of the 19 December 1999 Russian legislative election in the Orekhovo-Zuyevo constituency
Candidate	Party	Votes	%
Vladimir Bryntsalov (incumbent)	Russian Socialist Party	74,652	26.77%
Sergey Sobko	Independent	46,613	16.72%
Anatoly Savinov	Independent	43,691	15.67%
Boris Lutset	Yabloko	20,168	7.32%
Leonid Yasenkov	Russian All-People's Union	18,258	6.55%
Anatoly Yepifanov	Independent	9,429	3.38%
Sergey Sokolov	Independent	8,456	3.03%
against all		48,412	17.36%
Total		278,850	100%

=== 2003 ===
Summary of the 7 December 2003 Russian legislative election in the Orekhovo-Zuyevo constituency
Candidate	Party	Votes	%
Sergey Sobko	Communist Party	59,829	27.16%
Vladimir Bryntsalov (incumbent)	United Russia	59,383	26.95%
Tatyana Bodrova	United Russian Party Rus'	18,649	8.46%
Tatyana Ivanova	Independent	13,788	6.26%
Aleksandr Borisov	Independent	7,302	3.31%
Igor Pelevin	Union of Right Forces	5,552	2.52%
Sergey Osmakov	Party of Russia's Rebirth-Russian Party of Life	3,961	1.80%
Sergey Kletenkov	Independent	681	0.31%
against all		43,740	19.85%
Total		220,629	100%

=== 2016 ===
Summary of the 18 September 2016 Russian legislative election in the Orekhovo-Zuyevo constituency
Candidate	Party	Votes	%
Valentina Kabanova	United Russia	65,246	39.52%
Nina Veselova	Communist Party	23,238	14.07%
Sergey Sobko	A Just Russia	18,568	11.25%
Andrey Svintsov	Liberal Democratic Party	17,507	10.60%
Ivan Zadumkin	Communists of Russia	6,647	4.03%
Artyom Kovalev	The Greens	6,223	3.77%
Artyom Zuyev	Yabloko	6,159	3.73%
Aleksandr Novopashin	Rodina	5,023	3.04%
Yury Savelov	Party of Growth	4,914	2.98%
Total		165,096	100%

=== 2021 ===
Summary of the 17-19 September 2021 Russian legislative election in the Orekhovo-Zuyevo constituency
Candidate	Party	Votes	%
Gennady Panin	United Russia	127,354	56.16%
Dmitry Agranovsky	Communist Party	43,207	19.05%
Mikhail Demidovich	Liberal Democratic Party	11,543	5.09%
Olga Panina	A Just Russia — For Truth	9,451	4.17%
Oleg Gabdrakhmanov	Party of Pensioners	8,177	3.61%
Yekaterina Mikhaleva	The Greens	5,605	2.47%
Sergey Belokhvost	Rodina	4,783	2.11%
Anton Galkin	Yabloko	4,773	2.10%
Pavel Shelpakov	Party of Growth	2,601	1.15%
Total		226,780	100%

=== 2026 ===
Summary of the 18-20 September 2026 Russian legislative election in the Orekhovo-Zuyevo constituency
Candidate	Party	Votes	%
Gennady Panin (incumbent)	United Russia	155,464	58.60%
Vladimir Fondarinov	Communist Party	33,920	12.79%
Sergey Khalezin	Liberal Democratic Party	22,176	8.36%
Artyom Kovalev	New People	21,819	8.22%
Aleksandr Nikolayev	A Just Russia	14,558	5.49%
Svetlana Smirnova	Yabloko	8,557	3.23%
Vladimir Ovchinnikov	The Greens	6,292	2.37%
Total		265,296	100%
