= List of members of the State Duma of Russia who died in office =

The following is a list of members of the State Duma of the Russian Federation who died in office since its establishment in 1993.

== List ==
Member	Party	Constituency	Date of death	Age at death (years)	Cause
Nikolay Pyatchits	CPRF	Party list	31 March 1994	47	
Andrey Aizderdzis	Independent	Mytishchi	26 April 1994	35	Assassinated
Yekaterina Popova	Women of Russia	Party list	29 July 1994	52	
Vasily Selyunin	Choice of Russia	Party list	27 August 1994	66	
Valentin Martemyanov	CPRF	Party list	5 November 1994	62	Killed in a robbery
Sergey Skorochkin	LDPR	Kolomna	1 February 1995	33	Assassinated
Sergei Markidonov	Independent	Chita	26 November 1995	34	Shot by his bodyguard
Dmitri Volkogonov	Choice of Russia	Party list	6 December 1995	67	Stomach cancer
Vitaly Savitsky	Choice of Russia	Western St. Petersburg	9 December 1995	40	Car crash
Yury Polyakov	Power to the People	Prikubansky	December 1996	60	Went missing; presumably murdered
Nikolai Manzhosov	CPRF	Georgiyevsk	8 March 1997	61	
Alzam Saifullin	APR	Birsk	30 August 1997	56	
Aleksandr Maksakov	CPRF	Balakovo	4 November 1997	61	
Aleksandr Petrik	CPRF	Kanevskaya	12 April 1998	56	
Lev Rokhlin	NDR	Party list	3 July 1998	51	Murdered
Alexander Eliseev	CPRF	Party list	26 October 1998	51	
Galina Starovoytova	Independent	Northern St. Petersburg	20 November 1998	52	Assassinated
Vladimir Zelenin	Independent	Perm–Leninsky	10 April 1999	62	
Nikolai Panarin	Independent	Shchyokino	13 September 1999	63	
Gennady Luzin	Independent	Monchegorsk	25 January 2000	63	Road accident
Gherman Titov	CPRF	Kolomna	20 September 2000	65	Accidental carbon monoxide poisoning
Vladimir Lushin	Unity	Party list	17 January 2002	58	
Aleksandr Vereteno	Independent	Omsk Central	20 April 2002	40	Boating accident
Vladimir Golovlyov	SPS	Party list	21 August 2002	45	Assassinated
Vladimir Semenkov	LDPR	Party list	5 September 2002	56	Car crash
Vladimir Gusenkov	Independent	Murmansk	5 November 2002	56	Blood cancer
Sergei Yushenkov	SPS	Party list	17 April 2003	52	Assassinated
Vladimir Toporkov	CPRF	Yelets	18 June 2003	62	
Yuri Shchekochikhin	Yabloko	Party list	3 July 2003	53	Acute allergy; suspected poisoning
Yuri Ten	NPRF	Irkutsk	21 July 2003	51	Cancer
Yuri Lossky	United Russia	Borzya	15 June 2004	51	Acute heart failure
Kirill Ragozin	United Russia	Party list	20 February 2005	37	Accident
Vladimir Litvinov	United Russia	Kamensk-Shakhtinsky	17 June 2005	66	Drowning
Ivan Zhdakayev	CPRF	Sakhalin	15 December 2005	48	Complications from heart surgery
Valery Kuzin	United Russia	Ust-Orda Buryat	27 April 2006	42	Heart failure
Vladimir Kazakovtsev	CPRF	Party list	29 May 2006	56	Heart attack
Yuri Nazmeev	United Russia	Party list	27 July 2006	59	
Valery Melnikov	United Russia	Party list	14 September 2008	51	
Gennady Dyudyaev	United Russia	Party list	19 November 2009	62	
Yuli Kvitsinsky	CPRF	Party list	3 March 2010	73	Cancer
Yuri Maslyukov	CPRF	Party list	1 April 2010	72	
Viktor Ilyukhin	CPRF	Party list	19 March 2011	62	Heart failure
Vladimir Stalmakhov	United Russia	Party list	9 July 2011	41	Heart failure
Vasily Starodubtsev	CPRF	Party list	30 December 2011	80	Heart attack
Vyacheslav Osipov	United Russia	Party list	19 December 2012	75	
Alevtina Aparina	CPRF	Party list	29 December 2013	72	
Lyudmila Shvetsova	United Russia	Party list	29 October 2014	65	
Valery Zubov	A Just Russia	Party list	27 April 2016	62	
Vasily Tarasyuk	LDPR	Party list	6 May 2017	68	Drowning
Oleg Grishchenko	United Russia	Saratov	17 June 2017	50	
Irina Yevtushenko	United Russia	Party list	13 September 2017	60	Cancer
Stanislav Govorukhin	United Russia	Party list	14 June 2018	82	
Alexander Korovnikov	United Russia	Novgorod	10 August 2018	63	
Joseph Kobzon	United Russia	Party list	30 August 2018	80	Cancer
Zhores Alferov	CPRF	Party list	1 March 2019	88	Acute cardiopulmonary failure
Nikolay Kovalyov	United Russia	Oryol	5 April 2019	69	
Airat Khairullin	United Russia	Nizhnekamsk	7 February 2020	49	Helicopter crash
Vakha Agaev	CPRF	Party list	23 September 2020	67	COVID-19
Valentin Shurchanov	CPRF	Party list	18 December 2020	73	COVID-19
Nikolay Antoshkin	United Russia	Party list	17 January 2021	78	COVID-19
Larisa Shoigu	United Russia	Party list	10 June 2021	68	
Pyotr Pimashkov	United Russia	Krasnoyarsk Central	12 August 2021	73	
Vladimir Zhirinovsky	LDPR	Party list	6 April 2022	75	COVID-19
Nikolay Petrunin	United Russia	Party list	12 October 2022	46	COVID-19
Nikolay Bortsov	United Russia	Lipetsk	23 April 2023	77	
Dzhasharbek Uzdenov	United Russia	Karachay-Cherkessia	23 April 2023	56	
Viktor Zubarev	United Russia	Divnogorsk	31 May 2023	62	
Artur Chilingarov	United Russia	Party list	1 June 2024	84	
Pavel Kachkayev	United Russia	Ufa	5 May 2025	73	Cardiac arrest
Mikhail Tarasenko	United Russia	Levoberezhny	22 July 2025	77	
Yury Shvytkin	United Russia	Krasnoyarsk	23 March 2026	60	
Aleksandr Samokutyaev	United Russia	Lermontovsky	17 June 2026	56	
Sergei Tchepikov	United Russia	Beryozovsky (No. 170)	17 September 2026	59	Cancer
