= Patkino =

Patkino (Russian: Паткино) is the name of several rural localities in Russia:

- Patkino, Ozyorsky District, Moscow Oblast, a village in Boyarkinskoye Rural Settlement of Ozyorsky District of Moscow Oblast
- Patkino, Ramensky District, Moscow Oblast, a village in Sofyinskoye Rural Settlement of Ramensky District of Moscow Oblast
- Patkino, Vladimir Oblast, a village in Alexandrovsky District of Vladimir Oblast
