= Vladimir Andreyev =

Vladimir Andreyev or Vladimir Andreev may refer to:

== Arts ==
- Vladimir Andreyev (actor) (1930–2020; also spelt Andreev), Soviet and Russian theatre and film actor
- Vladimir Andreev (artist), Russian artist whose work was represented in the Exhibition of Leningrad artists (1970)
- Vladimir Andreev (producer), film producer, of the 1999 experimental film Tuvalu

== Military ==
- Vladimir Andreyev (admiral) (1904–1994), Soviet naval officer
- Vladimir Andreyev (military officer) (1942–2025), Soviet and Russian military officer

== Sport ==
- Vladimir Andreev (basketball) (born 1945), retired Russian basketball player
- Vladimir Andreyev (racewalker) (born 1966), Russian race walker
- Vladimir Andreyev (skier) (born 1958), retired Soviet alpine skier
