= Kashirsky =

Kashirsky (masculine), Kashirskaya (feminine), or Kashirskoye (neuter) may refer to:

- Kashirsky District, several districts in Russia
- Kashirsky (rural locality) (Kashirskaya, Kashirskoye), several rural localities in Russia
- Kashirskaya, a station of the Moscow Metro, Moscow, Russia
- Kashirskoye, Kazakhstan, former name of Terengkol
