= Predrag Dragić =

- Born: 8 December 1945; Kragujevac, PR Serbia, FPR Yugoslavia
- Died: 29 January 2012 (aged 66); Belgrade, Serbia
- Resting place: Belgrade New Cemetery
- Other name: Kijuk
- Education: University of Belgrade
- Occupations: Writer, playwright, historian and philosopher

Predrag R. Dragić Kijuk (Serbian Cyrillic: Предраг Р. Драгић Кијук; 8 December 1945 – 29 January 2012) was a Serbian humanist, writer, essayist, anthologist, playwright, literary and art critic, lexicographer, medievalist, historian, translator, philosopher and researcher of Dostoevsky. He graduated at the Belgrade University: philology, philosophy and law, and took specializations in Italy, Greece, Russia, France and Norway.

== Biography ==
Dragić was operational editor of the Serbian Literary Magazine and the editor in chief of the Literary Newspaper). He authored many books, studies, and essays, five of which have been translated into foreign languages. He specifically studied old Serbian literature (in 1987 he published the provocative and voluminous study Medieval and Renaissance Serbian Poetry 1200-1700). His themes of interest are diverse and original, and his intellectual curiosity is a mixture of modern world poetry, philosophy of numbers, Christian esthetics, the works of Dostoevsky, Gogol and Andreyev, the history of European civilization, European esoteric writers, protohistory of Serbs and Slavs, the phenomenon of migrations and the Christian-Orthodox mysticism. Also, he has devoted his attention in his two latest books to the aberration of modern politics and the influence of the Vatican on the destiny of the Serbian people (Bestiarium Humanum, 2002; Atlantocracy As a Jesuit Ideal, 2005).

His book Tempter and the Redeemer (1990) was the first to introduce the theistic method into the genre of essay writing in Serbia, equaling it to other methods in the interpretation of literature, while the book Going Out to Play (1990) has had cult influence on European personalism. In 2003, Sir John Tavener, the most popular British composer reputed as a "classical artist" used texts from the book Medieval and Renaissance Serbian Poetry 1200-1700 written by Predrag R. Dragić Kijuk, for his monumental work "The Veil of the Temple" (performed by four choirs, several orchestras and soloists, seven hours in duration).

== Selected bibliography ==
- A Poem About The Goat (1974)
- Demons Among Us - Criticism of the Work of F.M. Dostoevsky (1981)
- Petar Mladenović (a three-lingual monography about the academic painter, 1986)
- Medieval and Renaissance Serbian Poetry (in the English language, 1987)
- Saga on Flight (1988)
- Serbian Migrations - Miloš Crnjanski (in the English language, in co-authorship with M. Dačović; (1988)
- The Battle of Kosovo (in the English language, in co-authorship with D. Bataković, 1988)
- Vicarious Christi (1989)
- The Ordeal Maker and the Redeemer (1990)
- Coming Out for a Game (1990)
- Catena Mundi, l-ll (1992)
- Declaration of Serbian Language in co-authorship with Dr. Vera Bojić and All. (1998)
- The Little Legacy, (1999)
- Bestiarium humanum ("Political Dairy"; 2002)
- Atlantocracy As a Jesuit Ideal (2005)
