= Yegoryevsky =

Yegoryevsky (masculine), Yegoryevskaya (feminine), or Yegoryevskoye (neuter) may refer to:

- Yegoryevsky District, name of several districts in Russia
- Yegoryevsky (inhabited locality) (Yegoryevskaya, Yegoryevskoye), name of several rural localities in Russia
