= Sergey Skorochkin =

Russian politician and businessman (1961–1995)

- Сергей Скорочкин
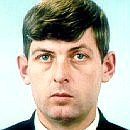

Member of the State Duma for Kolomna
- In office 11 February 1994 – 1 February 1995
- Preceded by: constituency created
- Succeeded by: Gherman Titov

Personal details
- Born: Sergey Grigoryevich Skorochkin; 10 July 1961 Nazarovo, Russian SFSR, Soviet Union
- Died: 1 February 1995 (aged 33) Sarybyevo, Moscow Oblast, Russia
- Party: Liberal Democratic Party of Russia

Sergey Grigoryevich Skorochkin (Russian: Сергей Григорьевич Скорочкин; 10 July 1961 – 1 February 1995) was a Russian politician and businessman who was a deputy of the State Duma of the first convocation from the Liberal Democratic Party of Russia faction. He was assassinated by an unknown person in 1995.

== Biography ==
Sergey Skorochkin was born on 10 July 1961 in the city of Nazarovo, Krasnoyarsk Krai, to a working-class family.

Having received a secondary education, he served in the Soviet Army, and later worked as a tractor driver. During perestroika, he began to engage in entrepreneurial activities, in particular, he worked as the general director of a plant in the city of Zaraysk, Moscow Oblast, which was engaged in the production of cheap vodka, and a repair and construction cooperative. In December 1993, he was elected to the State Duma of the first convocation. Skorochkin was nominated to the State Duma by a group of voters "Union of December 12", and joined the Liberal Democratic Party of Russia faction. During his time as a deputy, he served as a member of the Labor and Social Support Committee.

Skorochkin became the only member of the Duma to be accused of homicide during his term in office. On Easter night from 1 May to 2 May 1994, a Georgian national, Irakli Shanidze and his cohabitant, 26-year-old Oksana Guseva, were shot by a Kalashnikov rifle in Zaraysk. Skorochkin became the main suspect in this case. According to his version, Shanidze himself killed Guseva, and then Skorochkin, having snatched his machine gun from him, shot him. At the same time, Skorochkin emphasized his state of Irresistible impulse and the use of self-defense. At one of the interrogations, Skorochkin said: “What would you do in my place? I think you would do the same!” However, according to investigators, he acted by no means in a state of irresistible impulse but very professionally: he shot directly from the window of a Volga, firing 18 bullets. The State Duma refused the idea of removing Skorochkin's parliamentary immunity. Not only the LDPR faction led by Vladimir Zhirinovsky spoke in his defense, but also many other deputies. Skorochkin himself repeatedly ignored calls to the prosecutor's office for interrogations, and soon moved to live in the UK, citing the interests of his family's safety.

Skorochkin had a reputation for a very expensive lifestyle. One of the last scandals associated with him was a night fight in the Hotel Moscow on 2 December 1994.

== Kidnapping and death ==
On 1 February 1995, Skorochkin was kidnapped in Zaraysk at about 11:35 p.m. from the bar "At Viktor's" by a group of unknown men in camouflage clothing. The attackers introduced themselves as OMON officers, which led Skorochkin to offer no resistance. His body was found the next day near the village of Sarybyevo, Lukhovitsky District. An autopsy showed that Skorochkin was shot five times in the head with a TT pistol, which severely disfigured his face. A mask was found next to the body, suggesting that the deputy saw the face of his killer before he died. The weapon from which Skorochkin was killed was found only in the spring, under the fallen snow.

LDPR leader Vladimir Zhirinovsky demanded the most thorough investigation of the murder and declared at a meeting of the State Duma that it was a political murder. More than 200 deputies representing various factions attended the memorial service.

=== Investigation ===
The investigation was entrusted to the same brigade that was investigating the murders of Guseva and Shanidze. The first suspect in ordering the murder of Skorochkin was the Nizhny Novgorod businessman Nikolay Lopukhov, to whom Skorochkin sold his vodka factory. It was found that by the beginning of 1995, Lopukhov had already paid most of the debt to Skorochkin for an enterprise valued at $1.2 million, but he still owed $388,000, which he had to return on 29 January 1995. However, he did not do this, and three days later Skorochkin flew in from the UK and was killed.

The perpetrators of the murder were Skorochkin's former bodyguard, Oleg Lipkin, and his friend. Weapons were found in their homes. On 5 April 1995, Lipkin and his accomplices were arrested; during the searches in their homes, a large amount of explosives, two handguns and an automatic rifle were found. They refused to testify. Soon their accomplices were also arrested - some were Zorin, Evseyev, T. Kurgin and Moskalyov. They testified that they had taken part in the kidnapping and transportation of Skorochkin. They did not know who ordered the murder.

On 22 June 1995, Lopukhov was arrested. He acknowledged the existence of a debt to Skorochkin, but said that he was going to ask for a delay and take money from the profits. However, the investigation established another possible motive for Lopukhov - he claimed Skorochkin's seat in the State Duma.

On 29 October 1998, by decision of the jury of the Moscow Regional Court, Lopukhov, Evseyev, Zorin and Moskalyov were acquitted and released from custody immediately. The crime was qualified as "the kidnapping of a person, resulting in his death." On 26 November of the same year, the court sentenced Lipkin to 5.5 years in prison, and his accomplice to 4.5 years, without confiscation of property and serving the sentence in a general regime corrective labor colony.

In February 1999, the Supreme Court of Russia overturned the guilty verdict. In May 2001, the Supreme Court again overturned the sentence. and in May 2003 - for the third time. In February 2005, the case was dismissed due to the statute of limitations.

== In popular culture ==
The documentary film "The Murder of Deputy Skorochkin" (1999) was released as part of the Criminal Russia series.

The Skorochkin case was also the subject of an episode of the program Independent Investigation (2000).

== Family ==
Skorochkin had a wife and two children.

== See also ==
- List of members of the State Duma of Russia who died in office
