= Andreyev =

Andreyev (Russian: Андреев) is a common Russian surname. It derives from Andrei, the Russian form of "Andrew". The name is also sometimes spelled Andreev, Andreeff, or Andrejew. Its feminine form is Andreyeva (Russian: Андреевa), sometimes spelled Andreeva.

Notable people with the surname include:

== A ==
- Adelaide Andreyeva von Skilondz, or Adelaide von Skilondz (1880–1969), Russian opera soprano singer and singing teacher
- André Andrejew (1887–1967), French-Russian production designer, a classic of the film decor building
- Alexander Fedorovich Andreev (1893–1941), Russian inventor of the jetpack
- Alexander Fyodorovich Andreev (1939–2023), Russian physicist
- Andrey Andreyev (politician) (1895–1971), Soviet politician, Politburo member under Stalin
- Anatole Andrejew (1914–2013), French scientist, biochemist of Russian origin
- Adrian Andreev (born 2001), professional Bulgarian tennis player
- Andrey Andreev (born 1974), Russian-British entrepreneur

== B ==
- Boris Andreyev (1915–1982), Soviet film actor, People's Artist of the USSR
- Boris Andreyev (1940–2021), Soviet cosmonaut

== D ==
- Daniil Andreyev (1906–1959), Russian writer, author of ´The Rose of The World´, son of the writer Leonid Andreyev

== E ==
- Ekaterina Andreeva (journalist), Russian journalist and television presenter
- Ekaterina Andreeva (swimmer) (born 1993), Russian swimmer
- Elena Kuchinskaya-Andreeva (born 1984), Russian racing cyclist
- Erika Andreeva (born 2004), Russian tennis player

== H ==
- Halyna Andreyeva (born 1985), Ukrainian beauty pageant contestant

== I ==
- Igor Andrejew (1915–1995), Polish lawyer, author of the Polish Criminal Code from 1969
- Igor Andreev (born 1983), Russian tennis player
- Iuliia Andreeva (born 1984), Kyrgyzstani long-distance runner

== L ==
- Leonid Andreyev (writer) (1871–1919), Russian writer and dramatist, one of the most important Russian modern writers
- Leonid Andreyev (doctor) (1891–1941), Soviet physiologist and surgeon
- Lyubov Andreyeva-Delmas (1884–1969), Russian mezzo-soprano opera singer

== M ==
- Maria Andreyeva (1868–1953), Russian/Soviet actress
- Mirra Andreeva (born 2007), Russian tennis player

== N ==
- Nadezhda Andreeva Udaltsova (1886–1961), Russian avant-garde artist
- Nadezhda Andreyeva (1959–2014), Soviet alpine skier
- Nikita Andreev (born 1988), Russian footballer
- Nikolai Nikolaevich Andreev (1880–1970), Soviet physicist
- Nikolay Andreyev (1873–1932), Russian sculptor and graphic artist, member of Wanderers (Peredvizhniki)
- Nikolay Andreyev (critic) (1892–1942), Soviet literary critic and student of folklore
- Nikolay Yefremovich Andreyev (historian) (1908–1982), Russian historian medievalist, lector at Cambridge, author of memoirs
- Nina Andreyeva (1938–2020), Russian teacher, author and political activist

== O ==
- Olga Andrejew Carlisle (born 1931), American writer, granddaughter of the writer Leonid Andrejew, daughter of the poet Vadim Andreyev

== P ==
- Paulina Andreeva (born 1988), Russian actress
- Pavel Andreyev (1874–1950), Russian bass-baritone opera singer
- Paweł Andrejew (1887–1942), Polish attorney of Russian origin
- Piotr Andrejew (1947–2017), Polish film director, grandson of Paweł Andrejew

== S ==
- Sasha Andreev (born 1981), American actor
- Sergey Andreyev (born 1956), Soviet football player and Russian coach
- Sergei Andreeyev (born 1970), Uzbekistani football player
- Sergei Andrejev (1897–1930), Estonian Communist politician
- Stepan Andreyev, 18th-century Russian polar explorer

== T ==
- Tatiana Andreeva (born 1970), Soviet figure skater
- Teodora Rumenova Andreeva (born 1987), Bulgarian pop-folk singer

== V ==
- Vadim Andreyev (born 1958), Russian film and theatre actor
- Vadim Andreyev (poet) (1906–1959), Russian poet exiled in Berlin and Paris, author of Childhood, son of Leonid Andreyev
- Vasily Andreyev (1861–1918), Russian musician and balalaika virtuoso
- Vasily Andreyev-Burlak (1843–1888), Russian actor
- Viktoriya Andreyeva (born 1992), Russian swimmer
- Vladimir Andreyev (disambiguation), several people

== Y ==
- Yelena Andreyeva (born 1969), Russian sprinter and medalist at the 1995 World Championships in Athletics

== See also ==
- Andrew § East Slavic surnames

== Bibliography ==
- Unbegaun, B. O. (1972). Russian Surnames. Oxford University Press.
