= Sergey Chebotaryov =

Russian statesman

- Сергей Чеботарёв
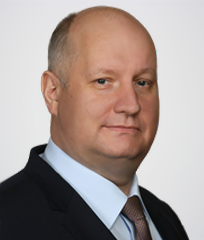

Deputy Minister of Economic Development
- In office 8 February 2020 – 16 March 2020

Minister for North Caucasus Affairs
- In office 18 May 2018 – 15 January 2020
- Preceded by: Lev Kuznetsov
- Succeeded by: Office abolished

Personal details
- Born: Sergey Viktorivich Chebotaryov; 14 October 1969 (age 56) Magdagachi, Russian SFSR, Soviet Union
- Party: Independent

Sergey Viktorivich Chebotaryov (Russian: Сергей Викторович Чеботарёв; born 14 October 1969), is a Russian politician who has been Head of the Secretariat of the Deputy Chairman of the Security Council of Russia since 11 March 2020.

Chebotaryov had been a deputy Minister of Economic Development from 7 February 2020 to 16 March 2020. He held the post of Minister for North Caucasus Affairs from 2018 until the abolition of the ministry in 2020.

== Biography ==
Sergey Chebotrayov was born on 14 October 1969 in Magdagachi, Tygdinsky District, Amur Oblast. From 1976 to 1984 he studied at Chita secondary school No. 4. From 1984 to 1986, he attended the Ussuriysk Suvorov Military School, and in 1990 he graduated from the Far Eastern Higher Combined Arms Command School.

From 1990 to 1998, Chebotrayov served in the Soviet Border Troops, later the Russian Border Troops (according to media reports - at the Russian military base in Bambora, Gudauta District in Abkhazia).

From 1998 to 2004, Chebotaryov was engaged in scientific and teaching activities at Moscow universities. From 2004 to 2018, he worked in various positions in the Presidential Administration of Russia. From 2006 to 2012, he was head of a department in the Russian Presidential Administration for Interregional and Cultural Relations with Foreign Countries. Between the fall of 2011 and the spring of 2012, Chebotaryov oversaw the 2011 South Ossetian presidential election. From June 2012, he was a deputy head of department and on behalf of the Presidential Administration oversaw Russia's relations with Armenia, Georgia, Azerbaijan, Abkhazia and South Ossetia. In March 2014, he was included in the Interdepartmental Commission for the preparation and holding of international interregional economic forums.

On 18 May 2018, Chebortayov was proposed by Prime Minister of Russia, Dmitry Medvedev, as Minister for North Caucasus Affairs as part of the Second Medvedev cabinet. On the same day, he was appointed to the position by decree of the President of Russia. On 21 January 2020, the ministry was abolished. On 8 February 2020, by decree of the President of Russia, Chebortayov was appointed a deputy Minister of Economic Development. He left that position on 16 March 2020.

== Additional information ==
Chebortayov is a candidate of Legal Sciences, Associate Professor. He can speak, English and Chinese. He is married, and is the father of two children.

In 2018 a number of media outlets mistakenly reported that the mayor of Tambov, also named Sergey Cherbotaryov had been appointed the new Minister for North Caucasus Affairs.
