= Ernst August Köstring =

German diplomat

Ernst-August Köstring
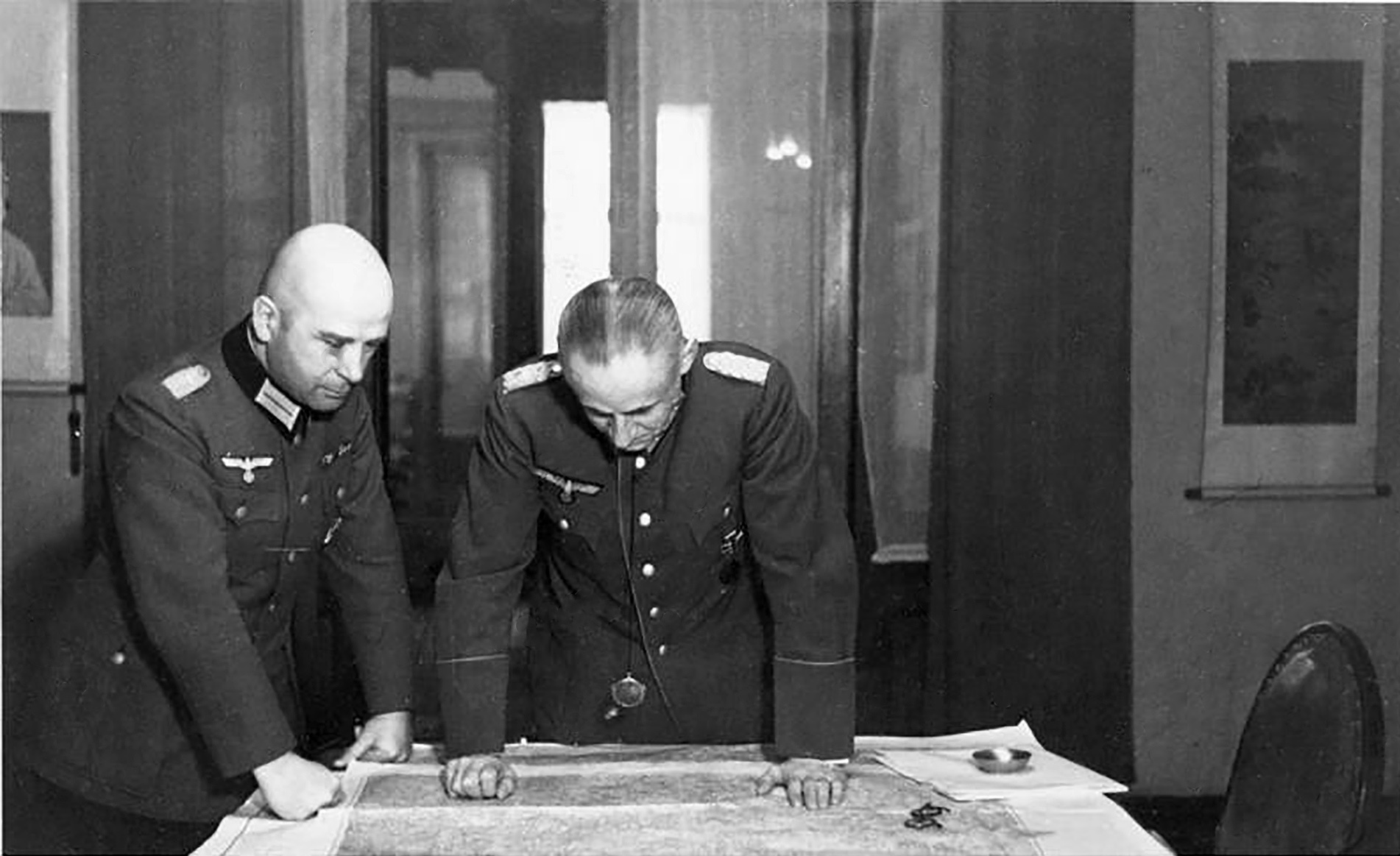
- Köstring (right) along with Hans Krebs (1941)
- Born: 20 June 1876; Serebryanye Prudy, Tula Governorate, Russian Empire
- Died: 20 November 1953 (aged 77); Unterwössen, West Germany
- Military career
- Allegiance: German Empire; Weimar Republic; Nazi Germany
- Branch: Prussian Army; Reichsheer; Army (Wehrmacht)
- Service years: 1895–1933; 1935–1945
- Rank: General of the Cavalry
- Conflicts: World War I World War II
- Awards: Knight's Cross of the War Merit Cross with Swords

Ernst-August Köstring (20 June 1876 – 20 November 1953) was a German diplomat and officer who served during World War II.

== Early life and military career ==
Born in Imperial Russia in 1876, Ernst August Köstring grew up in St Petersburg (or Moscow) and was fluent in Russian. He left Russia just before World War I like many other Germans. He took part in the war and served under Major General Hans von Seeckt in the Austro-Hungarian Seventh Army. After the war, he was retained in the Reichsheer. From 1919, he was back in the Prussian War Ministry and then detached to the Ministry of the Reichswehr that year soon after it had been established.

On 1 August 1935, he was returned to active service as a military attaché to Russia and Lithuania and sent back to Moscow. During the invasion of Poland, as a German military attaché in Moscow, Köstring played a key role in co-ordination between Nazi Germany and Soviet Union. In September 1939, he was involved in the Molotov–Ribbentrop Pact negotiations, along with Colonel Heinrich Aschenbrenner. On 8 August 1940, Köstring was warned by General Franz Halder that "he would have to answer a lot of questions soon", which made him one of a few people who knew of the invasion of the Soviet Union despite the non-aggression pact. With the planned Operation Barbarossa, his position in Moscow was untenable.

On 1 May 1941, German military delegation, including Köstring and Hans Krebs, attended the Soviet military parade in Moscow in honour of International Workers' Day.

After operation Barbarossa started on June 22 he was repatriated under diplomatic immunity and assigned to the Führerreserve. He visited, together with Friedrich Werner von Schulenburg, prisoner-of-war camps to recruit Soviet prisoners-of-war for the German war effort.

On 1 September 1942, he was appointed "General Officer attached to Army Group A for Caucasian Questions" under General Eduard Wagner. In that role, he worked on creating national legions among the indigenous people of the Caucasus, among them the Muslim Karachai. He arranged for Armenians, Georgians, and other Caucasian populations to fight at the front after training in Poland. Most of the Armenians deserted.

The Karachai had formed an anti-Soviet committee under Qadi Bayramukov(ru) before the Germans arrived. Köstring invited them to the Bairam feast on 11 October. He was exceptionally well received and was carried shoulder-high in celebration, as was the custom.

In the spring of 1943, Köstring was put into the Führerreserve. In mid-June 1943, he was appointed Inspector of the German-commanded Turkic associations. On 1 January 1944, he was appointed the General of the "volunteer" organizations in the Army High Command. Throughout that period, he spent most of his time helping with the creation of Andrey Vlasov's Russian Liberation Army.

He surrendered on 4 May 1945 to the US Army and he was released in 1947. He co-authored the 1946 book The Peoples of the Soviet Union, which was later used by the US Army.

== Sources ==
- Mitcham, Samuel W. (2009) Men of Barbarossa: Commanders of the German Invasion of Russia 1941. Casemate.
