= Lev Vladimirovich Kuznetsov =

Russian politician and businessman (born 1965)

Lev Kuznetsov
- Лев Кузнецов
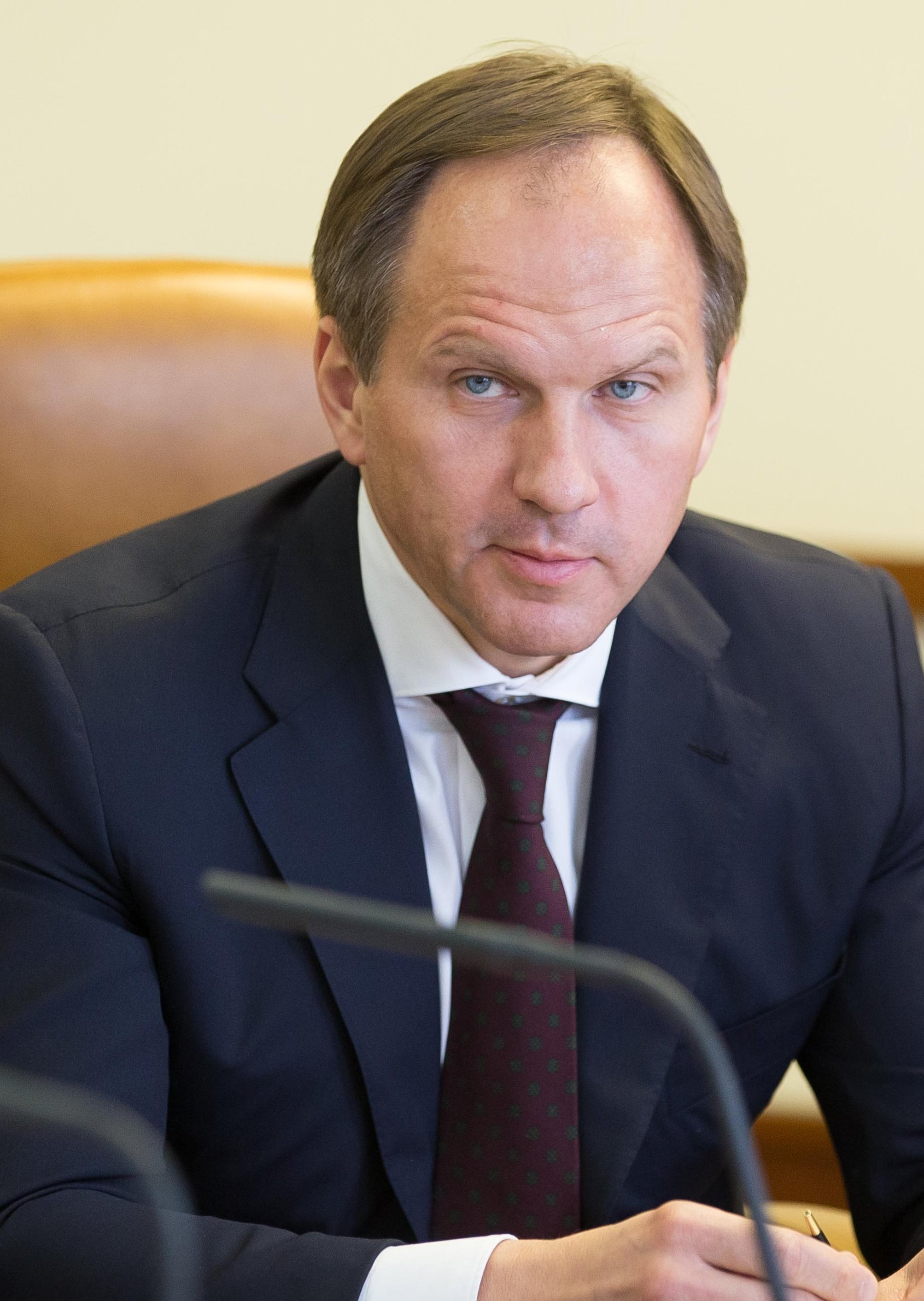
- Kuznetsov in 2014

Minister for North Caucasus Affairs
- In office May 12, 2014 – May 18, 2018
- Preceded by: Position established
- Succeeded by: Sergey Chebotaryov

5th Governor of Krasnoyarsk Krai
- In office February 17, 2010 – May 12, 2014
- Preceded by: Edkham Akbulatov (acting); Alexander Khloponin
- Succeeded by: Viktor Tolokonsky

Mayor of Norilsk (acting)
- In office 6 June 2003 – 12 November 2003
- Preceded by: Gennady Petukhov (acting)
- Succeeded by: Valery Melnikov

Personal details
- Born: April 25, 1965 (age 61) Moscow, RSFSR, Soviet Union
- Party: United Russia
- Education: Finance Academy under the Government of the Russian Federation
- Profession: Politician, businessman

Lev Vladimirovich Kuznetsov (Russian: Лев Владимирович Кузнецов, IPA: [ˈlʲef vlɐˈdʲimʲɪrəvʲɪtɕ kʊzʲnʲɪˈtsof]; born April 25, 1965) is a Russian politician and businessman. Since 2015 he has served as the Russian Minister for North Caucasus Affairs. From February 2010 to May 2014, Kuznetsov was the Governor of Krasnoyarsk Krai.

He graduated from the State Finance Academy in 1990.

== Career ==
Previously he was an advisor on Economic Matters to Governor Alexander Khloponin, the acting mayor of Norilsk, and Khloponin's First Deputy Governor from 2003 to 2007.

From June 2020 to September 2023 he was the General Director of Intergeo Management Company LLC.

== Awards ==
- Order of Saint Daniel of Moscow, II degree, of the Russian Orthodox Church
- Order of Merit for the Republic of Dagestan (2016)
