= Nikita Chaplin =

Russian politician (born 1982)

- Никита Чаплин
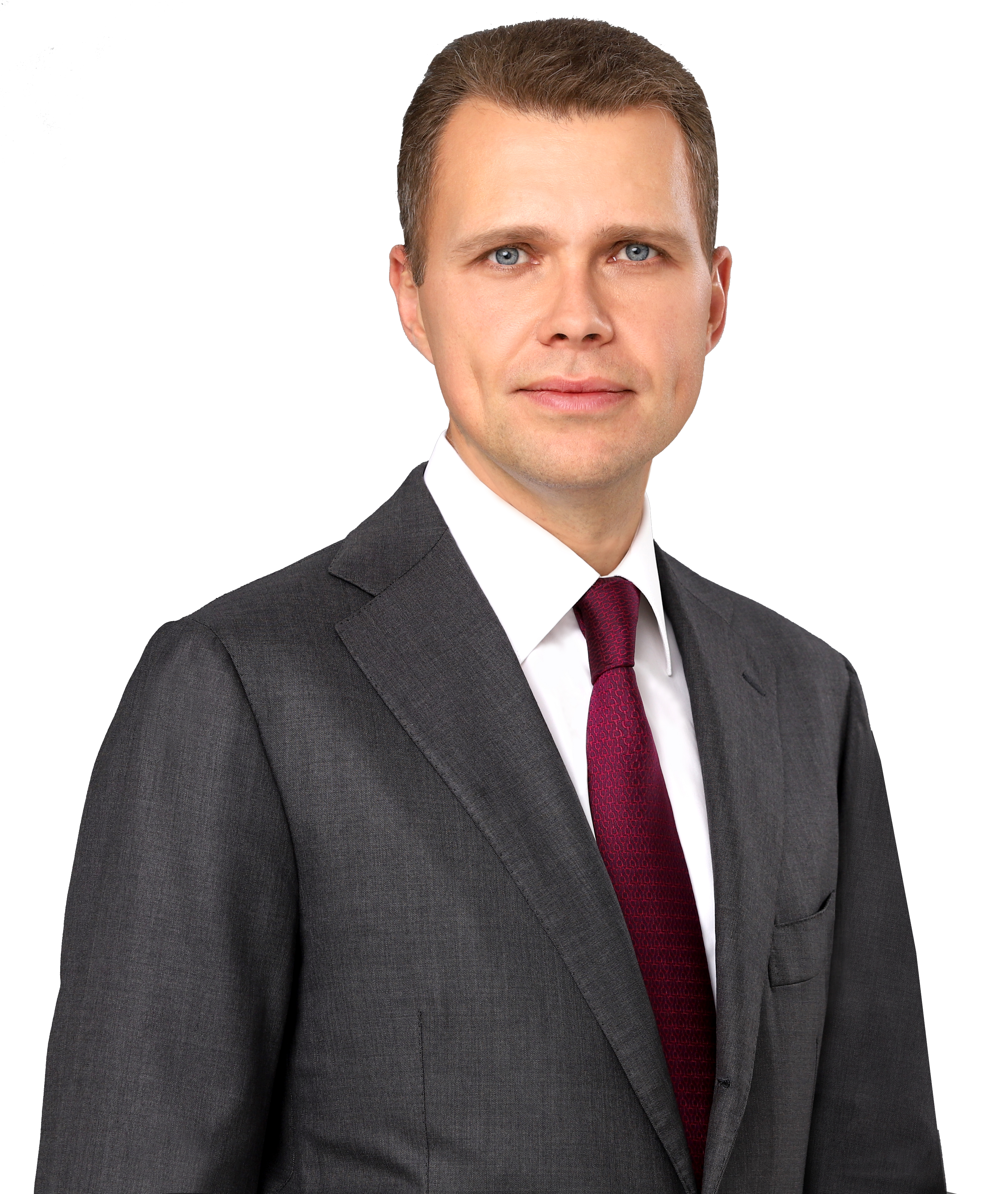

Member of the State Duma for Moscow Oblast
- Incumbent
- Assumed office 12 October 2021
- Preceded by: Yelena Serova
- Constituency: Kolomna (No. 119)

Personal details
- Born: 28 July 1982 (age 44) Ramenskoye, Moscow Oblast, Russian SFSR, USSR
- Party: United Russia
- Education: Moscow State University

Nikita Yuryevich Chaplin (Russian: Никита Юрьевич Чаплин; born 28 July 1982, Ramenskoye, Moscow Oblast) is a Russian political figure and a deputy of the 8th State Duma.

== Early life and education ==
In 2004 he graduated with distinction from the Law School of Moscow State University.

== Career ==
From 1999 to 2007, he worked as a lawyer and director of several large law firms. In 2007–2021, he was a deputy of Moscow Oblast Duma of the 4th, 5th, and 6th convocations. In August 2021 Chaplin was assigned a special representative of the regional government in the urban district of Kolomna. Since September 2021, he has served as a deputy of the 8th State Duma.

=== Sanctions ===
He was sanctioned by the UK government in 2022 in relation to the Russo-Ukrainian War.

== Award ==
- 2021 — Medal of the Order "For Merit to the Fatherland", 1st class
- 2021 — Medal of Saint Basil of Ryazan, 1st class
- 2022 — Order of Saint Seraphim of Sarov, 3rd class
- Honorary Citizen of the Kolomna Urban District, Moscow Oblast
