= Gennady Panin =

Russian politician

- Геннадий Панин
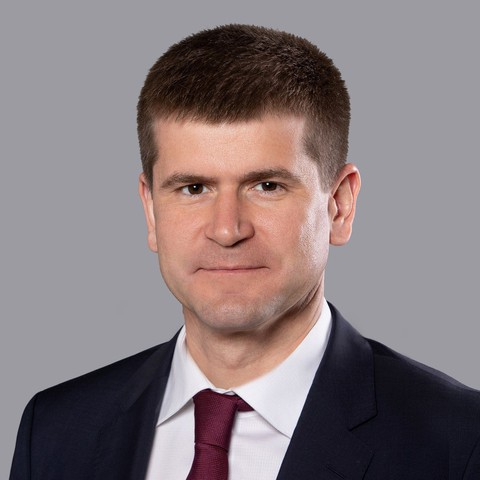

Member of the State Duma for Moscow Oblast
- Incumbent
- Assumed office 12 October 2021
- Preceded by: Valentina Kabanova
- Constituency: Orekhovo-Zuyevo (No. 123)

Personal details
- Born: 13 June 1981 (age 45) Vereya, Orekhovo-Zuyevsky District, Moscow Oblast, Russian SFSR, USSR
- Party: United Russia
- Education: Vladimir State University for the Humanities; RANEPA

Gennady Panin (Russian: Геннадий Олегович Панин; born 13 June 1981 in Vereya, Orekhovo-Zuevsky urban district) is a Russian political figure and a deputy of the 8th State Duma.

At the beginning of the 2000s, Panin engaged in business. In 2003, he joined the Young Guard of United Russia. From 2008 to 2014, Panin was the deputy of the Council of Deputies of Orekhovo-Zuyevo City District. From 2009 to 2014, he was the Chairman of the Council of Deputies of the city district of Orekhovo-Zuyevo. From 2014 to 2021, Panin was the head of the Orekhovo-Zuyevo City District. On September 14, 2016, Panin was appointed the head of the municipality. He left the post in 2021 when he was elected deputy of the 8th State Duma.

== Sanctions ==
He was sanctioned by the UK government in 2022 in relation to the Russo-Ukrainian War.
