= Kashirsky District =

Location of Moscow Oblast in Russia

Location of Voronezh Oblast in Russia

Kashirsky District is the name of several administrative and municipal districts in Russia:

- Kashirsky District, Moscow Oblast, an administrative and municipal district of Moscow Oblast
- Kashirsky District, Voronezh Oblast, an administrative and municipal district of Voronezh Oblast

== See also ==
- Kashirsky (disambiguation)
