= Kashirsky (rural locality) =

Kashirsky (Russian: Каши́рский; masculine), Kashirskaya (Каши́рская; feminine), or Kashirskoye (Каши́рское; neuter) is the name of several rural localities in Russia:

- Kashirskoye, Kaliningrad Oblast, a settlement in Khrabrovsky Rural Okrug of Guryevsky District of Kaliningrad Oblast
- Kashirskoye, Voronezh Oblast, a selo in Kashirskoye Rural Settlement of Kashirsky District of Voronezh Oblast
