= Yegoryevsky (inhabited locality) =

Yegoryevsky (Russian: Его́рьевский; masculine), Yegoryevskaya (Его́рьевская; feminine), or Yegoryevskoye (Его́рьевское; neuter) is the name of several rural localities in Russia:

- Yegoryevsky (rural locality), a selo in Kozelsky District of Kaluga Oblast
- Yegoryevskoye, Kaliningrad Oblast, a settlement in Dobrinsky Rural Okrug of Guryevsky District of Kaliningrad Oblast
- Yegoryevskoye, Moscow Oblast, a village in Nudolskoye Rural Settlement of Klinsky District of Moscow Oblast
- Yegoryevskoye, Knyagininsky District, Nizhny Novgorod Oblast, a selo in Ananyevsky Selsoviet of Knyagininsky District of Nizhny Novgorod Oblast
- Yegoryevskoye, Lyskovsky District, Nizhny Novgorod Oblast, a selo in Kislovsky Selsoviet of Lyskovsky District of Nizhny Novgorod Oblast
- Yegoryevskoye, Novosibirsk Oblast, a selo in Maslyaninsky District of Novosibirsk Oblast
- Yegoryevskoye, Oryol Oblast, a village in Znamensky Selsoviet of Znamensky District of Oryol Oblast
- Yegoryevskoye, Tver Oblast, a village in Kashinsky District of Tver Oblast
- Yegoryevskoye, Vladimir Oblast, a village in Alexandrovsky District of Vladimir Oblast
- Yegoryevskoye, Yaroslavl Oblast, a village in Ninorovsky Rural Okrug of Uglichsky District of Yaroslavl Oblast

== See also ==
- Yegoryevsk, a town in Moscow Oblast
