= Patkino, Vladimir Oblast =

Patkino Паткино
- Village
- Location within Vladimir Oblast Location within Russia
- Coordinates: 56°26′N 39°05′E
- Country: Russia
- Region: Vladimir Oblast
- District: Alexandrovsky District
- Time zone: UTC+3:00

Patkino (Russian: Паткино) is a rural locality (a village) in Andreyevskoye Rural Settlement, Alexandrovsky District, Vladimir Oblast, Russia. The population was 3 as of 2010.

== Geography ==
Patkino is located 30 km east of Alexandrov (the district's administrative centre) by road. Porechye is the nearest rural locality.
