= Lukhovitsy =

Town in Moscow Oblast, Russia

Lukhovitsy Луховицы
- Town
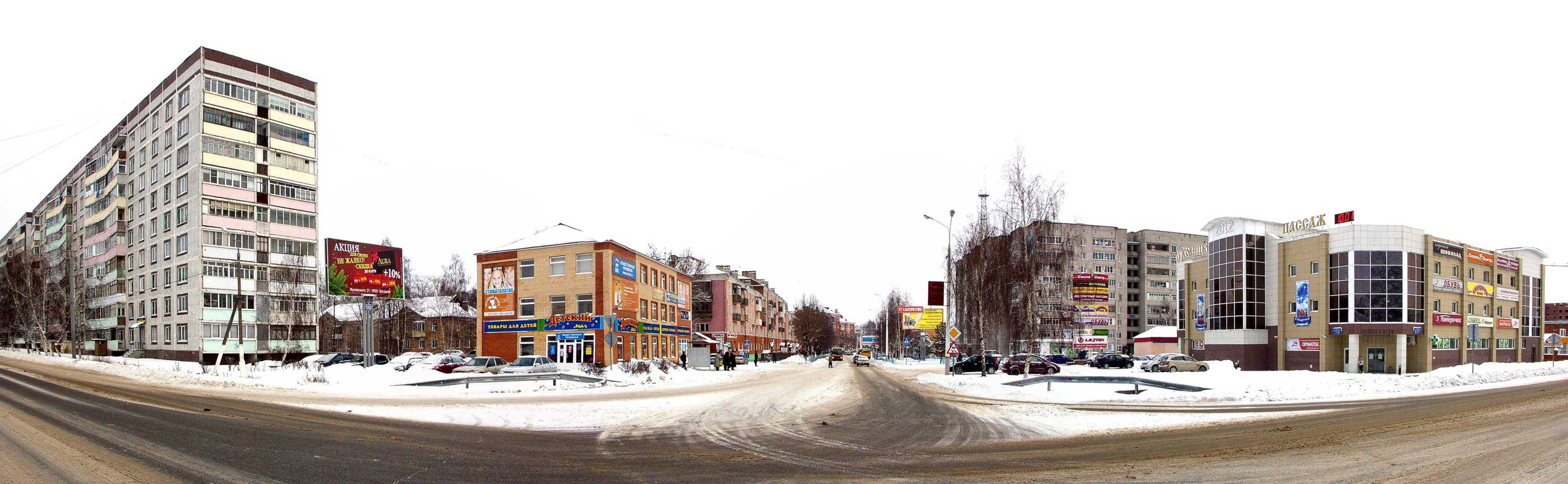
- Central Lukhovitsy

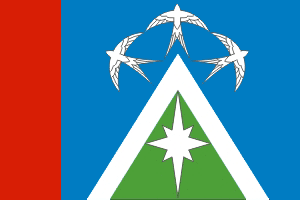
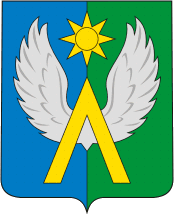
- Flag Coat of arms
- Interactive map of Lukhovitsy
- Location of Lukhovitsy Lukhovitsy (Moscow Oblast)
- Coordinates: 54°59′N 39°03′E
- Country: Russia
- Federal subject: Moscow Oblast
- Administrative district: Lukhovitsky District
- TownSelsoviet: Lukhovitsy
- First mentioned: 1594
- Town status since: 1957
- Elevation: 125 m (410 ft)

Population (2010 Census)
  - Total: 29,850
  - Estimate (2024): 29,808 (−0.1%)

Administrative status
  - Capital of: Lukhovitsky District, Town of Lukhovitsy

Municipal status
  - Municipal district: Lukhovitsky Municipal District
  - Urban settlement: Lukhovitsy Urban Settlement
  - Capital of: Lukhovitsky Municipal District, Lukhovitsy Urban Settlement
- Time zone: UTC+3 (MSK)
- Postal codes: 140500–140503, 140508
- OKTMO ID: 46547000001

Lukhovitsy (Russian: Лухови́цы) is a town and the administrative center of Lukhovitsky District in Moscow Oblast, Russia, located on the Oka River 135 kilometers (84 mi) southeast of Moscow. Population: 29,850 (2010 census); 32,403 (2002 census); 32,501 (1989 Soviet census).

== History ==
It was first mentioned in 1594 as the settlement of Glukhovichi (Глуховичи), a votchina of a Ryazan archbishop. It used to be called Lukhovichi (Луховичи) until the mid-1920s. In 1957, it was granted town status. The town grew rapidly after the transfer of testing (and later production) facilities of the Mikoyan design bureau.

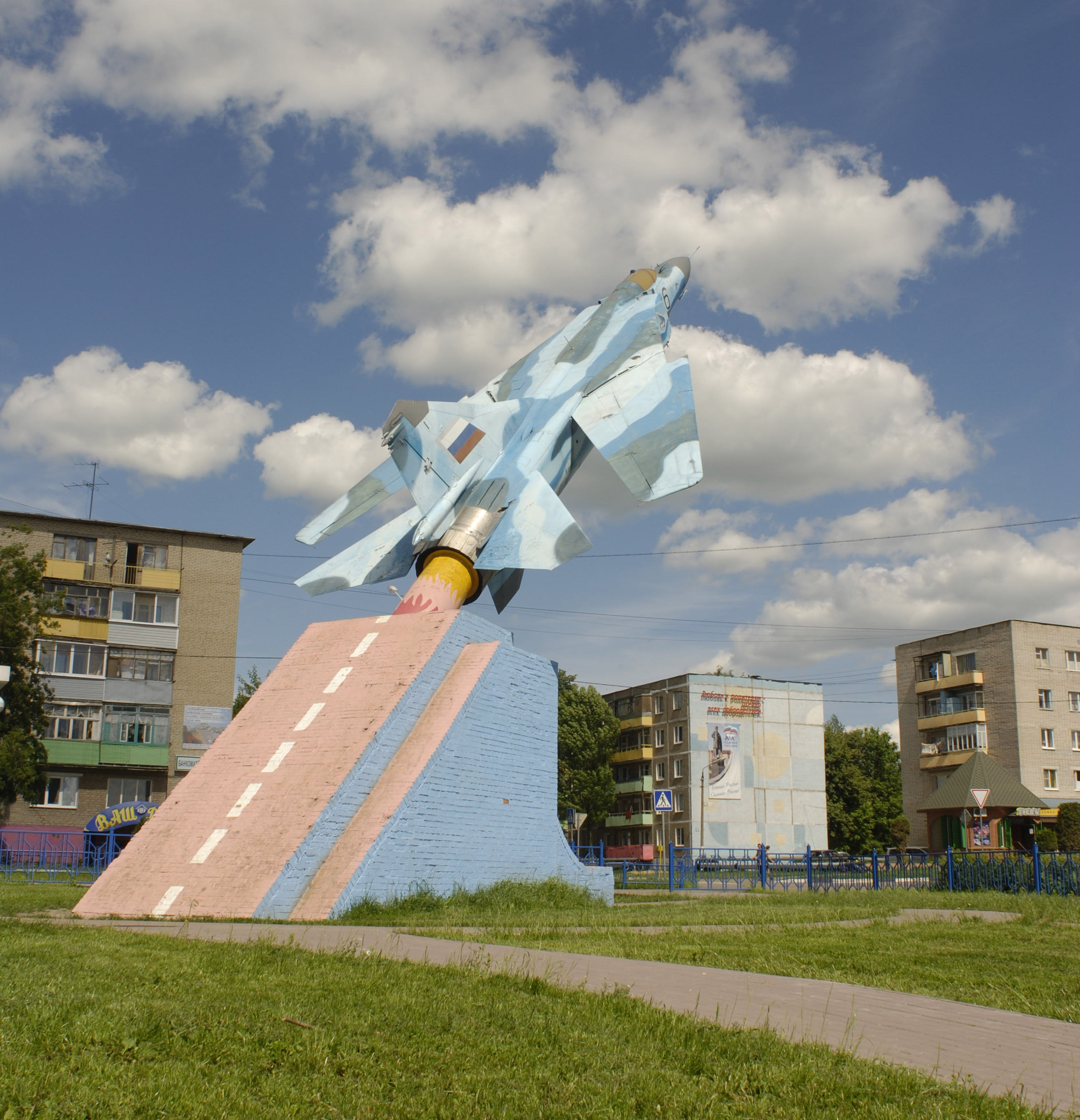
Monument to MiG-23 in Lukhovitsy

== Administrative and municipal status ==
Within the framework of administrative divisions, Lukhovitsy serves as the administrative center of Lukhovitsky District. As an administrative division, it is, together with the settlement of stantsii Chernaya, incorporated within Lukhovitsky District as the Town of Lukhovitsy. As a municipal division, the Town of Lukhovitsy is incorporated within Lukhovitsky Municipal District as Lukhovitsy Urban Settlement.

== Transportation ==
The town is served by the Tretyakovo Airport. A bus terminal is located here.

== Trivia ==
Lukhovitsy is famous for growing cucumbers; there is a monument of a cucumber in the town.
