= Exhibition of Leningrad artists (1970) =

1970 Soviet art exhibition

Exhibition of Leningrad artists of 1970. Catalog
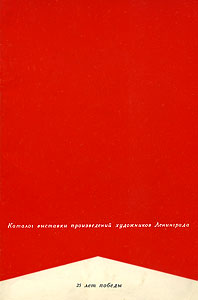
- Year: 1970
- Location: Leningrad Union of Soviet Artists Exhibition Halls; Leningrad

Exhibition of Leningrad artists of 1970 dedicated to the 25th anniversary of victory over Nazi Germany (Russian: "Выставка произведений ленинградских художников 1970 года, посвящённая 25-летию Победы над фашистской Германией") was opened in Exhibition Halls of the Leningrad Union of Soviet Artists and become one of the notable art exhibitions of 1970 in the USSR.

== History and organization ==
For the organization and preparation of the exhibition, an exhibition committee was formed, consisting of authoritative art experts. An exhibition catalog was published. At the whole exhibition, over 220 artists of Leningrad attended.

== Contributing artists ==
In the largest Department of Painting were exhibited art works of 81 authors. There were Vladimir Andreev, Sergei Babkov, Nikolai Baskakov, Yuri Belov, Dmitry Belyaev, Alexander Blinkov, Veniamin Borisov, Dmitry Buchkin, Rostislav Vovkushevsky, Nikolai Galakhov, Evgeny Galunov, Vasily Golubev, Alexander Gulayev, Nina Ivanova, Mikhail Kozell, Elena Kostenko, Anna Kostina, Yaroslav Krestovsky, Boris Lavrenko, Ivan Lavsky, Efim Latsky, Vladimir Malagis, Mikhail Natarevich, Yuri Neprintsev, Dmitry Oboznenko, Ivan Savenko, Vladimir Seleznev, Alexander Semionov, Arseny Semionov, Joseph Serebriany, Nikolai Timkov, Yuri Tulin, and others painters of the Leningrad School.

In the Department of Sculptures were exhibited art works of 23 sculptors. Department of graphics presented a creation of 83 artists.

== Contributed artworks ==
For exposure have been selected works of painting, sculpture and graphics, applied art created by artists from Leningrad during the Great Patriotic War and the siege of Leningrad, as well as during the postwar decades. Some of them were subsequently found in the collections of Soviet Art museums, as well as domestic and foreign galleries and collectors.

== Acknowledgment ==
Exhibition of Leningrad artists of 1970 was widely covered in press and in literature on Soviet fine art.

== See also ==
- Fine Art of Leningrad
- Leningrad School of Painting
- 1970 in fine arts of the Soviet Union
- Saint Petersburg Union of Artists
- Socialist realism

== Sources ==
- Выставка произведений ленинградских художников, посвященная 25-летию Победы над фашистской Германией. Каталог. Л., Художник РСФСР, 1972.
- Справочник членов Ленинградской организации Союза художников РСФСР. Л., Художник РСФСР, 1980.
- Художники народов СССР. Биобиблиографический словарь. Т.1-4. М., Искусство, 1970–1995.
- Справочник членов Союза художников СССР. Т.1-2. М., Советский художник, 1979.
- Хроника узловых событий художественной жизни России 1960-1980-х годов // Time for Change. The Art of 1960–1985 in the Soviet Union. Saint Petersburg, State Russian Museum, 2006.
- Sergei V. Ivanov. Unknown Socialist Realism. The Leningrad School. Saint Petersburg, NP-Print Edition, 2007. P.395, 417, 442. ISBN 5-901724-21-6, ISBN 978-5-901724-21-7
- Юбилейный Справочник выпускников Санкт-Петербургского академического института живописи, скульптуры и архитектуры имени И. Е. Репина Российской Академии художеств. 1915—2005. Санкт Петербург, «Первоцвет», 2007.
