= Valery Melnikov =

Russian politician

- Валерий Мельников

Member of the State Duma
- In office 24 December 2007 – 14 September 2008

Head of Norilsk
- In office 12 November 2003 – 14 December 2007
- Preceded by: Lev Kuznetsov (acting)
- Succeeded by: Sergey Shmakov

Member of the Legislative Assembly of the Krasnoyarsk Krai
- In office December 2001 – 12 November 2003

Personal details
- Born: Valery Vladimirovich Melnikov; 14 October 1956 Norilsk, Russia, Soviet Union
- Died: 14 September 2008 (aged 51) Moscow, Russia
- Party: United Russia

Valery Vladimirovich Melnikov (Russian: Валерий Владимирович Мельников; 14 October 1956 - 14 September 2008) was a Russian politician and trade union leader who had last served as Member of the State Duma from 2007 to 2008.

He served as the Mayor of Norilsk from 2003 to 2007.

== Biography ==
Valery Melnikov was born on 14 October 1956 in Norilsk. in 1975 he graduated from the Norilsk Industrial Institute and received a degree in electrical engineering.

He worked at the Komsomolsky mine as an electrician and mining foreman, and in 1989 he was elected chairman of the council of the labor collective.

He participated in organizing miners' strikes in the late 1980s and early 1990s.

In 1991, he took part in the creation of a new trade union - the Federation of Trade Unions of Miners, Processors and Metallurgists (later - the Federation of Trade Unions of OJSC MMC Norilsk Nickel), became its deputy chairman, and since 1997 he was the chairman.

In 2000, he received a second higher education, graduating from the Moscow Institute of Finance and Economics (now the Financial University under the Government of Russia) and receiving a degree in economics.

He was elected three times to the Norilsk City Council, and in December 2001, he was elected to the Legislative Assembly of the Krasnoyarsk Territory.

In January 2003, when the incumbent mayor of Norilsk, Oleg Budargin, was elected governor of the Taimyr (Dolgano-Nenets) Autonomous Okrug and early elections were called, Melnikov registered as a candidate and received 46 percent of the votes in the first round, but before the second round he was deregistered by the court.

In February 2003, he organized a protest against the actions of the plant's management.

The second round of elections did not take place due to the refusal of all candidates to participate in it, and in the repeat elections scheduled for October, he won in the first round, gaining 52 percent of the vote.

=== Member of the State Duma ===
In 2007, during the elections to the State Duma of the fifth convocation, Melnikov was included in the lists of the United Russia party in the Krasnoyarsk Krai group and, following the election results, received a deputy mandate, after which he served the term as mayor. He took office on 24 December.

He died on 14 September 2008 in Moscow.
