= Sergei Sobko =

Russian politician

- Сергей Собко
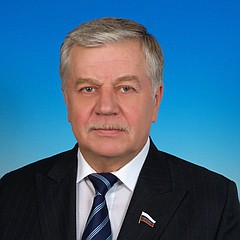
- Official portrait

Member of the State Duma
- In office December 2003 – 5 October 2016

Personal details
- Born: Sergei Vasilyevich Sobko; 12 June 1949 (age 77) Leninabad, Tajikistan, Soviet Union (now Khujand, Tajikistan)
- Party: Communist Party of the Russian Federation
- Other political affiliations: A Just Russia

Sergei Vasilyevich Sobko (Russian: Сергей Васильевич Собко; born 12 June 1949) is a Russian politician, chairman of the Russian Christian-Social Movement and deputy of the State Duma representing the Communist Party of the Russian Federation. Sobko is also the general director of the Sobko Corporation that comprises joint-stock company Tekhos.

== Biography ==
He was born on June 12, 1949, in Leninabad, USSR (now Khujand in Tajikistan). In childhood and youth, he engaged in figure skating and motor sports. In 1977 he graduated in 1977 from the Moscow Institute of Radio Engineering, Electronics, and Automation.

In 1969 he was elected head of the department of the Komsomol district committee of the Gagarinsky district of Moscow. He worked at the Elektronika Central Research Institute as an engineer and senior engineer, and later worked as a chief methodologist in the Cosmos pavilion at the Vystavka Dostizheniy Narodnogo Khozyaystva, or Exhibition of Achievements of National Economy, a permanent trade show and amusement park in Moscow. In 1980, he worked as an engineer, with the title deputy director for science, at the Central Institute of Economics and Information of the Non-Ferrous Metallurgy.

In 1989 he founded a business called Center for Goods and Services, which produces consumer goods. In 1991, he was elected chairman of the board of directors of the Yegoryevsky Tooling Plant. In the same year he founded the firm Sobko and Company.

In December 2003, he was elected to the fourth state Duma from the Orekhovo-Zuevsky constituency No. 112 of the Moscow Region. Sobko received 27.58% of the vote, while his rival Vladimir Bryntsalov, head of the Ferrein Company and member of the United Russia, received 26.93%. After the election, Bryntsalov challenged the results in court. On June 5, 2005, on the basis of evidence provided by Bryntsalov’s lawyers, a judge of the Pavlovo-Posad city court overturned the election results at eight polling stations. Sobko appealed this decision to the Moscow Regional Court, which overturned it on June 27, dismissing Bryntsalov’s evidence as falsified and confirming Sobko's victory. According to Sobko, unknown persons had entered the room where the used ballots were kept and spoiled several hundred of those that had been cast for Sobko.

In the state Duma, Sobko joined the Communist Party faction, although he is not a member of the party, and served as deputy chairman of the committee on industry, construction, and high technology. He also sat on the commission for reviewing federal defense and security expenditures and on the commission for technical regulation.

In 2005, Sobko signed the “Five Hundreds Letter,” an appeal to the general prosecutor’s office to investigate Jewish organizations and to seek to prohibit those engaged in extremist activity. The appeal led to widespread public criticism of the signatories. Sobko said that he did not call for banning any Jewish organizations, but that he considered it inadmissible to publish the text "Kitsur Shulchan Arukh,” which, for example, instructs Jewish women "not to help a non-Jewish woman in labor.”

In 2007, he was elected to the fifth state Duma from the Communist Party’s electoral list, again joining the Communist Party faction. Since 2010, he has been chairman of the industry committee of the state Duma of the Russian Federation. He is also a member of the commission for reviewing federal defense and state security expenditures. He also belongs to the Communist Party faction’s expert group on economic issues and industrial policy, the Moscow Region’s inter-factional deputy group, and the Public Chamber under the governor of the Moscow Region, B.V. Gromov. He is also active in the inter-faction parliamentary group on relations with the parliaments of Latin America, and is a member of the Communist Party faction in the Parliamentary Assembly of the Council of Europe (PACE). In addition, he is deputy chairman of the United Left group, which includes representatives of the socialist and communist parties in Europe.

In the elections to the seventh state Duma in 2016, he ran as a candidate for the Just Russia Party.

== Business ==
Founded in 1991, Sobko & Company was a diversified business, consisting of 11 enterprises. They produced spare railway parts, agricultural equipment, tools, soy-based foodstuffs, and plastic packaging; imported cosmetics and hygiene products; and ran a non-profit ophthalmological clinic. According to the weekly SmartMoney, the corporation had an annual turnover in 2006 of 500 million rubles. The metalworking plant Tehos, in Yegoryevsk near Moscow, earned 3.4 million rubles in 2004. According to the weekly, Sobko & Co. transfers a tenth of its profits to the Communist Party of the Russian Federation.

Sobko & Co. appears to have wound down operations in recent years.

== Awards ==
He received the Certificate of Honor of the President of the Russian Federation (April 11, 2014) for his contribution to the nation’s socioeconomic development, his humanitarian achievements, his strengthening of law and order, and his legislative and other public activities.

He was awarded the Order of the Holy Blessed Prince Daniel of Moscow II and III degree and the Order of St. Vladimir for restoring churches.

== Personal life ==
He has three children and seven grandchildren.

He plays billiards and the guitar.

=== Religious views ===
He is the chairman of the Russian Christian Social Movement, founded in 1996.

According to Sobko, over 70,000 children were treated for free at the non-profit Center for Vision Restoration, which is part of Sobko and Co. The center does not bring profits, as children from Moscow and Moscow region are treated there for free. Sobko has said, “I strive to follow the path of the teacher,” meaning Jesus Christ.
