= Anatole Andrejew =

Anatole Andrejew (9 September 1914 – 9 January 2013) was a French scientist and artist of Russian origin.

== Early life ==
Andrejew was born in St. Petersburg in September 1914. After the October Revolution of 1917 he left Russia with his parents for Lithuania, first to Kaunas and after two years to Wilno, then in Poland. After passing his baccalaureate exams at the gymnasium in Wilno he left Poland in July 1932 for Paris, where he studied biochemistry.

== Scientific career ==
After graduation he worked at the Pasteur Institute where he specialized in tuberculosis. In 1953 Andrejew published "The metabolism of the tubercle bacillus " with American scientist William F. Drea.

== Later life ==
In retirement, Andrejew divided his time between Paris and Honfleur in Normandy, where he painted Post-Impressionist art, particularly views of French cities and landscapes.

He held the following exhibitions:

- Army Exhibit (Regional and National) in Paris, France (3rd, 2nd and 1st Prize for Pastel)
- European Academy of Arts-France in Paris, France (silver medal)
- International Salon of Herouville(Caen, France)
- Exhibit at Galerie Everarts in Paris.

Andrejew died in Paris in January 2013 at the age of 98.

== Selected publications ==
- Andrejew A., Drea, William F. The metabolism of the tubercle bacillus, 1953, Charles C. Thomas Publisher Ltd., Springfield, IL, USA
- Andrejew A., Gernez-Rieux C., Tacquet A. Activité catalasique des Mycobactéries. Ann. Inst. Pasteur, Paris. 1956 Nov.
- Andrejew A., Gernez-Rieux C., Tacquet A. Action de l'INH et de la D-cyclosérine sur la peroxydase purifiée et sur l'activité peroxydasique des bacilles tuberculeux Ann. Inst. Pasteur, Paris. 1959 Feb.
- Andrejew A., Gernez-Rieux C., Tacquet A. Inhibition de peroxydase par l’hydrazine de l’acide isonicotinique (INH) et destruction de l’INH par la peroxydase. Bull Soc. Chim. Biol. (Paris) 41:1047, 1959
- Andrejew A., Gernez-Rieux C., Tacquet A. Attempts at differentiation of mycobacteria sensitive and resistant to INH by the aid of quantitative and qualitative tests of peroxidase activity. Discussion of technical problems. Ann. Inst. Pasteur, Paris. 1960 Dec.
- Andrejew A., Renard A. Essai de séparation des activités catalasique et peroxydasique chez les Mycobactéries. Ann. Inst. Pasteur, Paris. 1968 Jul.
