= Ozyory, Moscow Oblast =

Town in Moscow Oblast, Russia

Ozyory Озёры
- Town
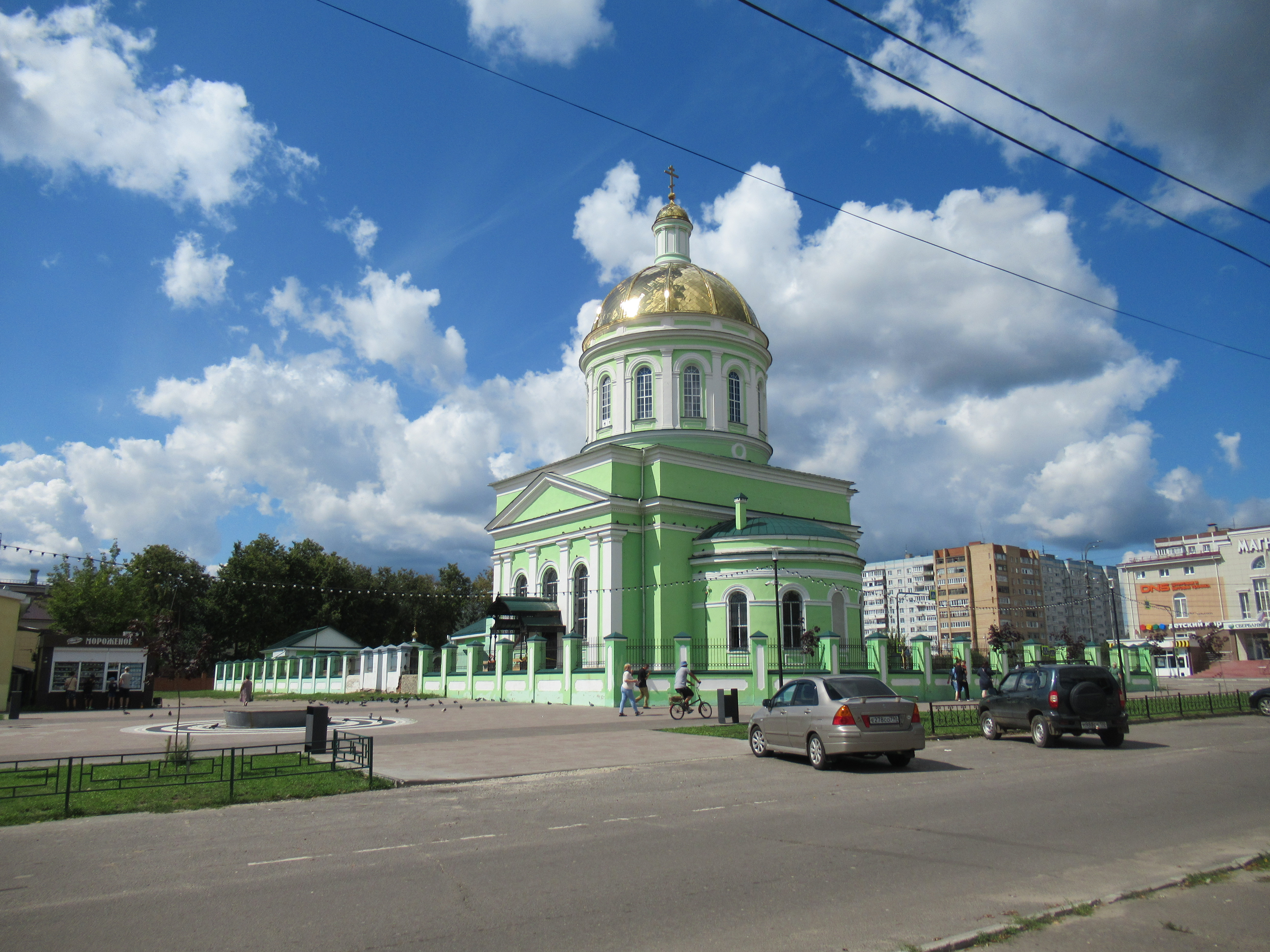
- Holy Trinity church

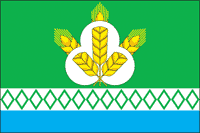
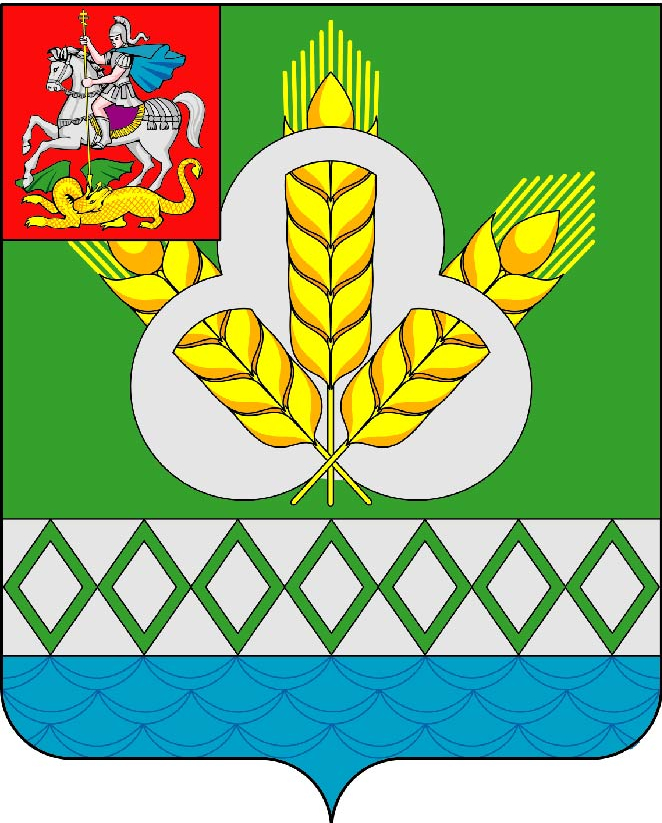
- Flag Coat of arms
- Interactive map of Ozyory
- Location of Ozyory Ozyory (Moscow Oblast)
- Coordinates: 54°51′N 38°34′E
- Country: Russia
- Federal subject: Moscow Oblast
- First mentioned: 1578
- Town status since: 1925
- Elevation: 120 m (390 ft)

Population (2010 Census)
  - Total: 25,800
  - Estimate (2025): 23,952 (−7.2%)

Administrative status
  - Subordinated to: Ozyory Town Under Oblast Jurisdiction
  - Capital of: Ozyory Town Under Oblast Jurisdiction

Municipal status
  - Urban okrug: Ozyory Urban Okrug
  - Capital of: Ozyory Urban Okrug
- Time zone: UTC+3 (MSK)
- Postal codes: 140560, 140563
- OKTMO ID: 46738000006

Ozyory (Russian: Озёры, IPA: [ɐˈzʲɵrɨ]) is a town in Moscow Oblast, Russia, located on the left bank of the Oka River, 157 kilometers (98 mi) southeast of Moscow. Population: 25,800 (2010 census); 25,704 (2002 census); 28,215 (1989 Soviet census).

== History ==
It was first mentioned in 1578 as the village of Marvinskoye Ozerko (Марвинское Озерко). In the late 18th century, it was renamed Ozerki (Озерки). In 1851, it received its present name Ozyory. It was granted town status in 1925.

== Administrative and municipal status ==
Within the framework of administrative divisions, it is, together with fifty-nine rural localities, incorporated as Ozyory Town Under Oblast Jurisdiction—an administrative unit with the status equal to that of the districts. As a municipal division, Ozyory City Under Oblast Jurisdiction is incorporated as Ozyory Urban Okrug.

=== Administrative and municipal history ===
Ozyorsky Municipal District was abolished on March 30, 2015, with its territory reorganized as Ozyory Urban Okrug. Within the framework of administrative divisions, on April 13, 2015 the inhabited localities of the low-level administrative divisions (the rural settlements) were subordinated to the Town of Ozyory, which remained the only subdivision of the administrative district. The administrative district itself was abolished on May 16, 2015, with its territory reorganized as Ozyory Town Under Oblast Jurisdiction.

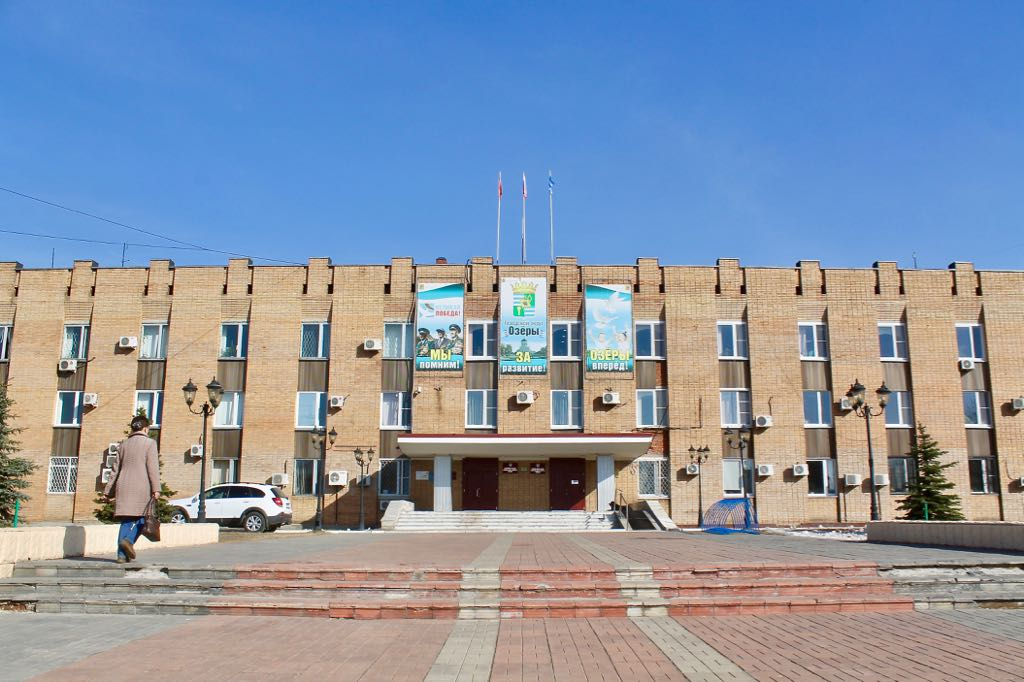
Town council

== Notable people ==
- Mikhail Katukov (1900–1976), Red Army commander, born in the village of Bolshoe Uvarovo
- Sergei Shirokov (b. 1986), professional ice hockey player, Olympic champion (Pyeongchang 2018), two-time World champion (Finland 2012, Belarus 2014)

== Twin towns and sister cities ==
Ozyory is twinned with:

- Dzerzhinsky, Russia

Former twin towns:

- Radom, Poland

On 28 February 2022, the Polish city of Radom ended its partnership with Ozyory as a reaction to the 2022 Russian invasion of Ukraine.

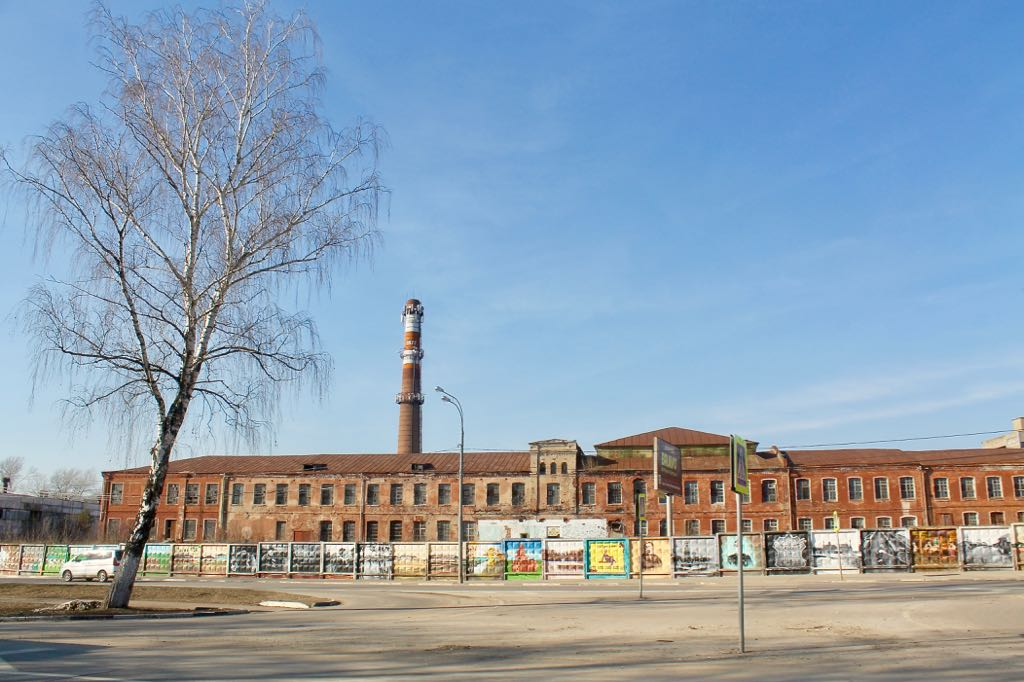
View of the textile factory

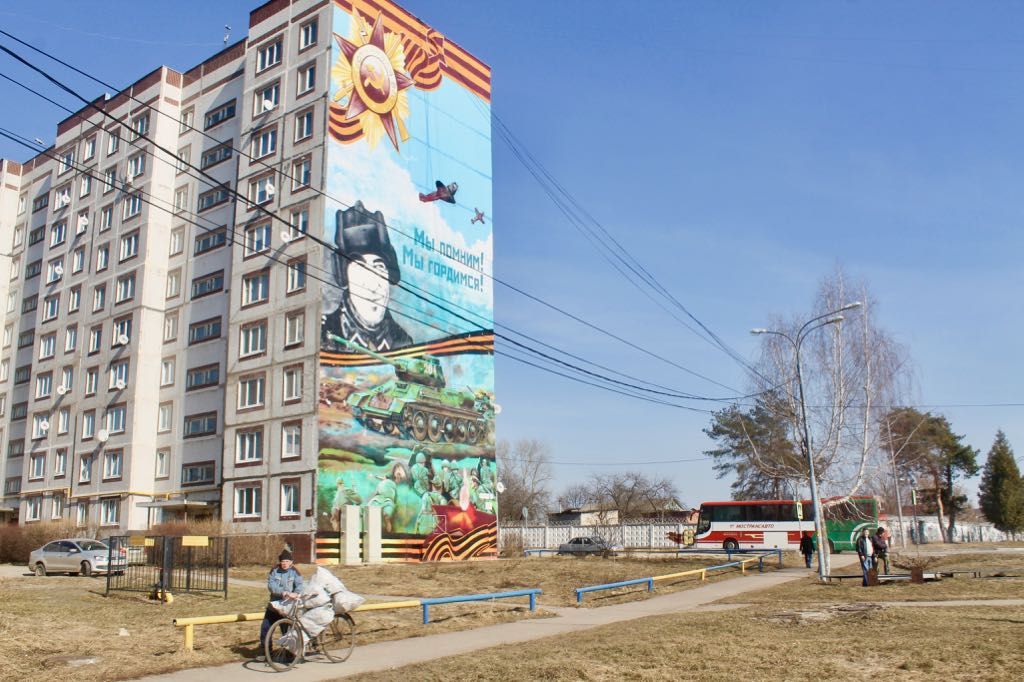

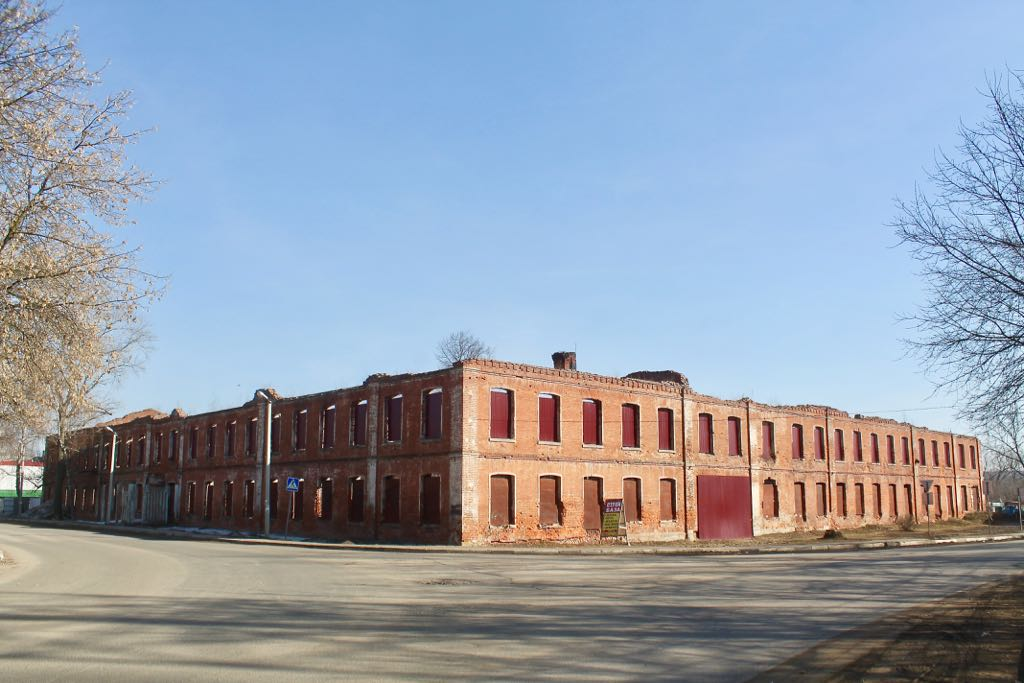
Old buildings
