= Roshal =

Roshal is a Jewish surname deriving from Hebrew: רש״ל ("Rabbi Shlomo Luria").

Notable people with this surname include:

- Alexander Roshal (1936–2007), a Soviet chess journalist, founder of the magazine 64
- Eugene Roshal, creator of RAR file format for data compression and archiving, and FAR file manager
- Grigori Roshal (1899–1983), a Soviet film director
- Leonid Roshal (b. 1933), a Russian pediatrician

== See also ==
- Roshal (town), a town in Moscow Oblast, Russia
