= Serebryanye Prudy =

Urban locality in Moscow Oblast, Russia

Serebryanye Prudy Сере́бряные Пруды́
- Urban-type settlement
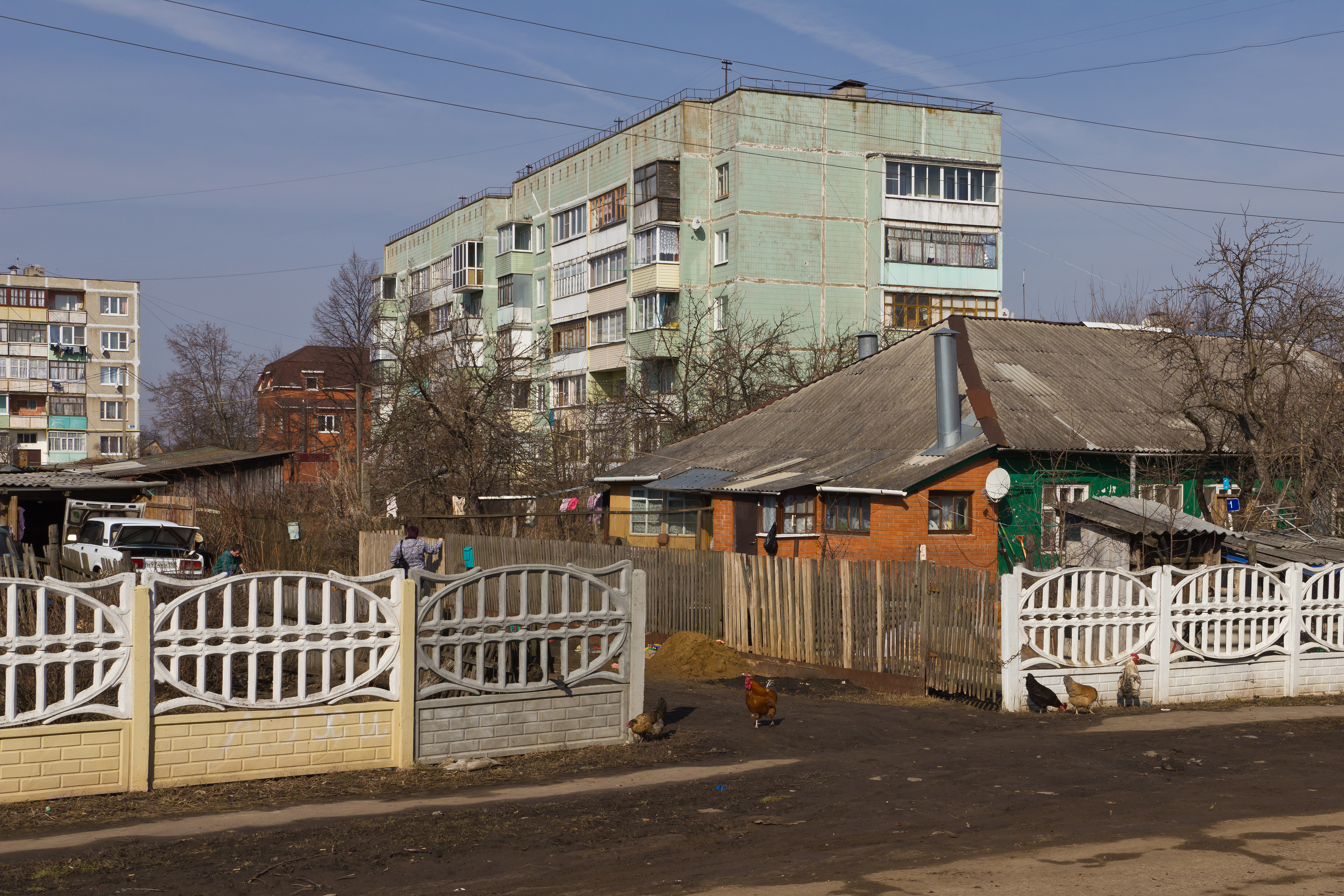
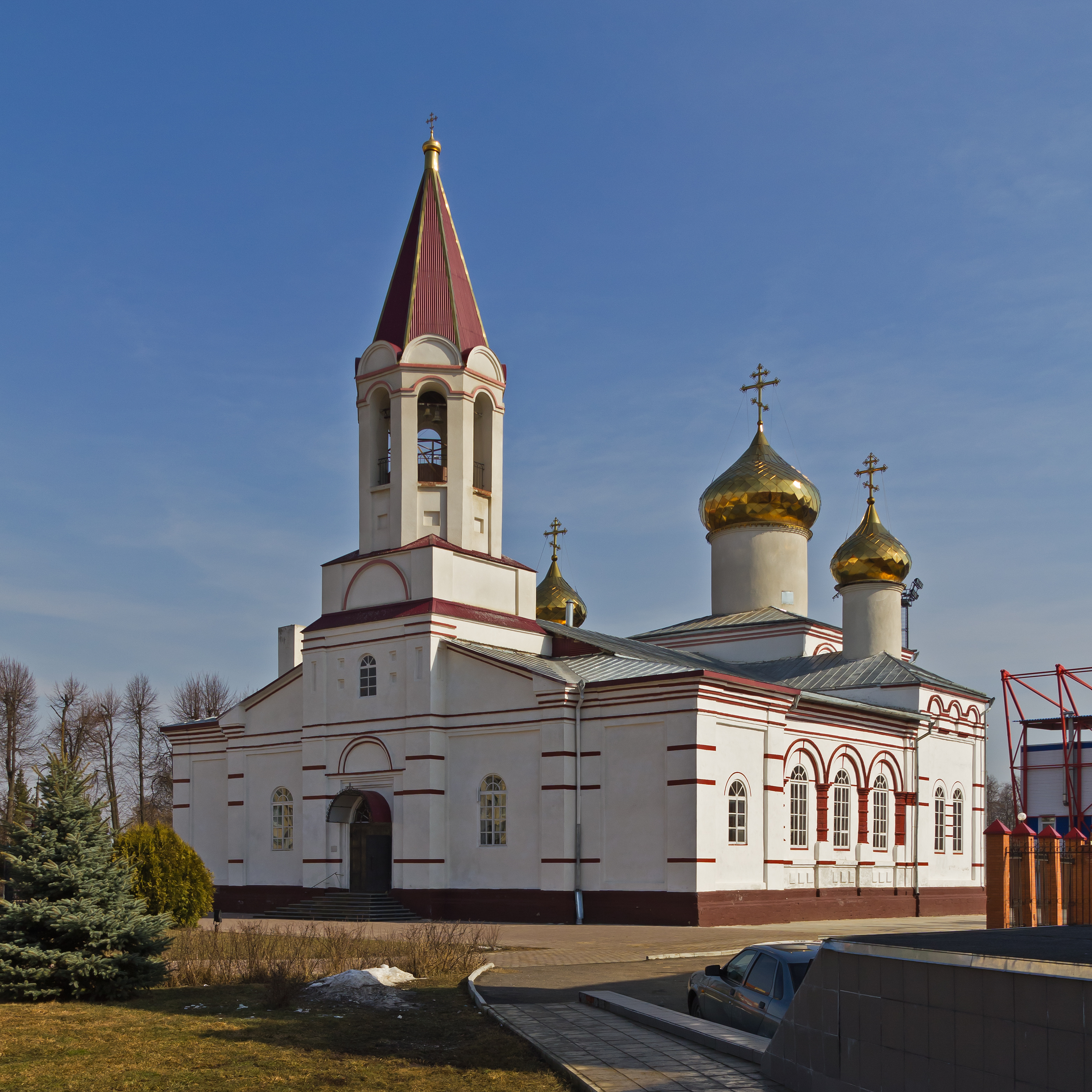
- Residential buildings in Serebryanye Prudy Church of Our Lady of the Sign

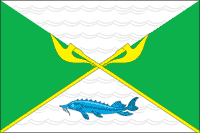
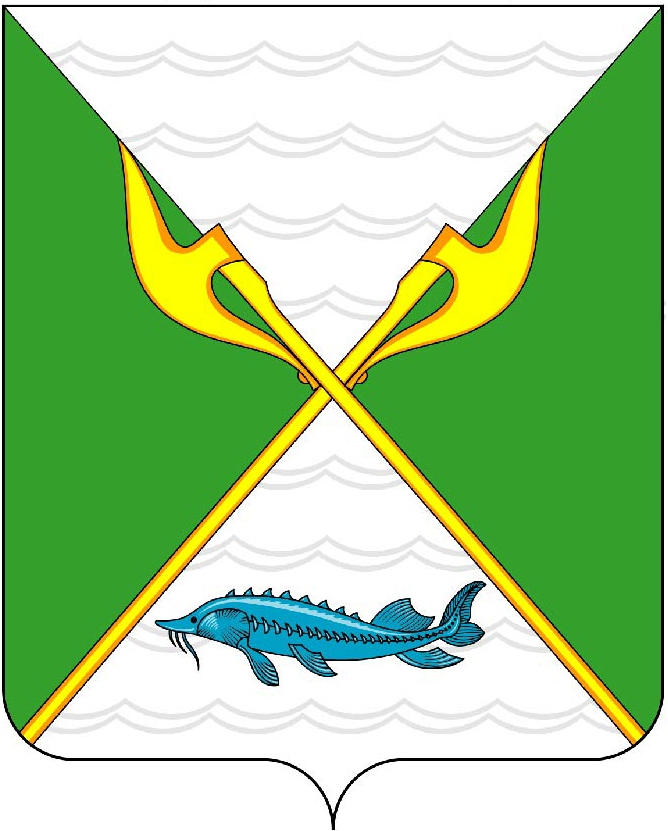
- Flag Coat of arms
- Interactive map of Serebryanye Prudy
- Location of Serebryanye Prudy Serebryanye Prudy (European Russia) Serebryanye Prudy (Russia) Serebryanye Prudy (Europe)
- Country: Russia
- Federal subject: Moscow Oblast
- First mentioned: c. 1571
- Urban-type settlement status since: 1961

Population (2021 Census)
  - Total: 8,960
  - Estimate (2024): 8,736 (−2.5%)

Administrative status
  - Capital of: Serebryano-Prudsky District
- Time zone: UTC+3 (MSK)
- Postal code: 142970
- Dialing code: +7 49667
- OKTMO ID: 46772000051

Serebryanye Prudy (Russian: Сере́бряные Пруды́, lit. Silver Ponds) is an urban locality (a work settlement) and the administrative center of Serebryano-Prudsky District of Moscow Oblast, Russia, located on the Osyotr River. Among the district centers of Moscow Oblast, it is the southernmost, and the furthest from Moscow.

Serebryanye Prudy is on the M6 highway (Moscow–Astrakhan) and the Moscow–Volgograd railway.

== History ==
Serebryanye Prudy was first mentioned in a chronicle in 1571. Under the Russian Empire, it was a village of Venyovsky Uyezd of Tula Governorate. It became a district center in 1924. In 1929, Serebryanye Prudy was transferred to the Central Industrial Oblast which in September 1937 was split, with the village finding itself again in Tula Oblast, only to be included into Moscow Oblast in 1942. It was granted urban-type settlement status in 1961.

=== Population ===
Historical population
Year	1989	2002	2010	2021
Pop.	8,977	8,969	9,705	8,960
±%	—	−0.1%	+8.2%	−7.7%
Source: Censuses

== Notable people ==
- Vasily Chuikov (1900–1982), Soviet military commander and marshal
- Ernst August Köstring (1876–1953), German diplomat and officer who served in World War I and World War II
