= Serebryano-Prudsky District =

Serebryano-Prudsky District Серебряно-Прудский район (Russian)
- District
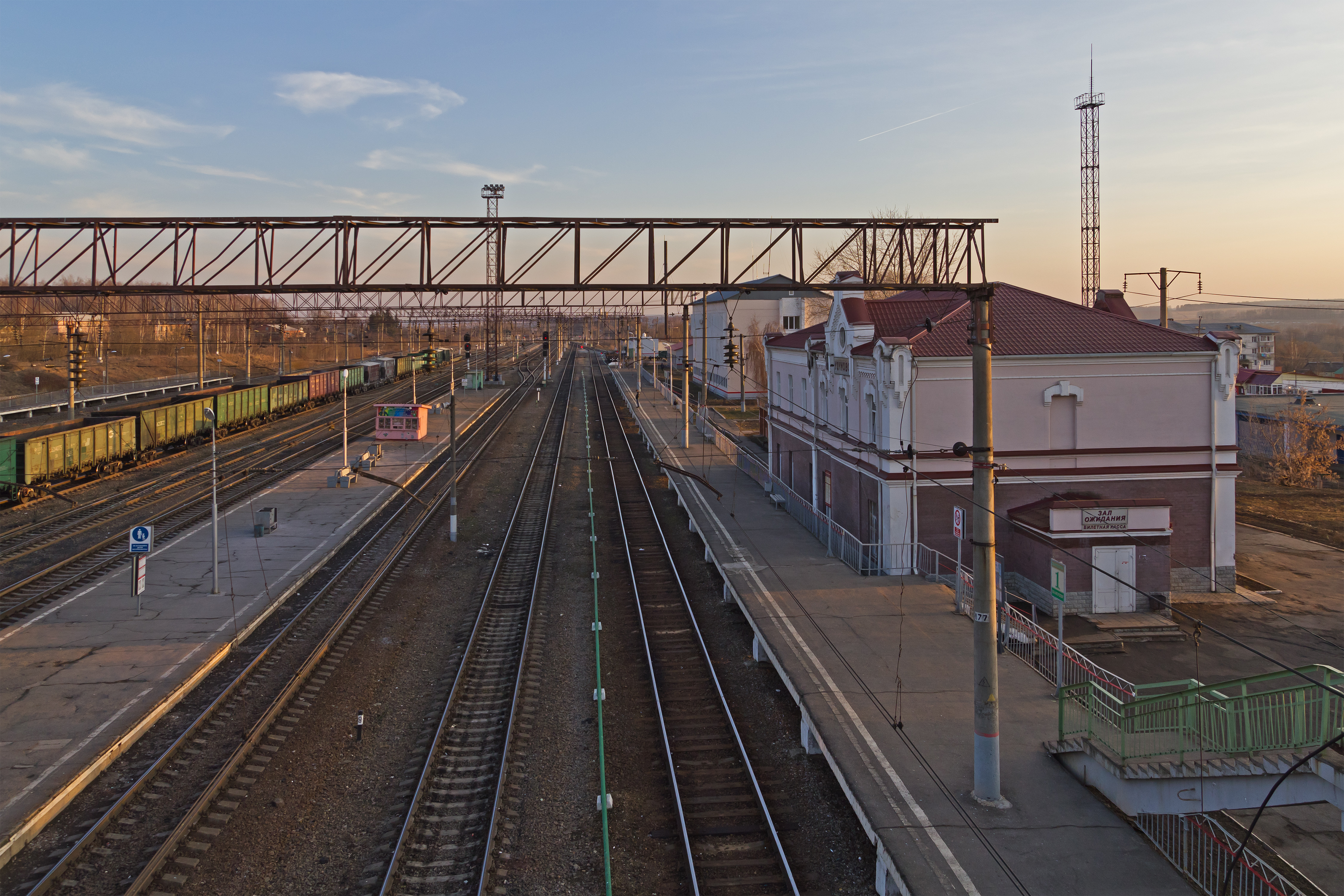
- Uzunovo Station, Serebryano-Prudsky District

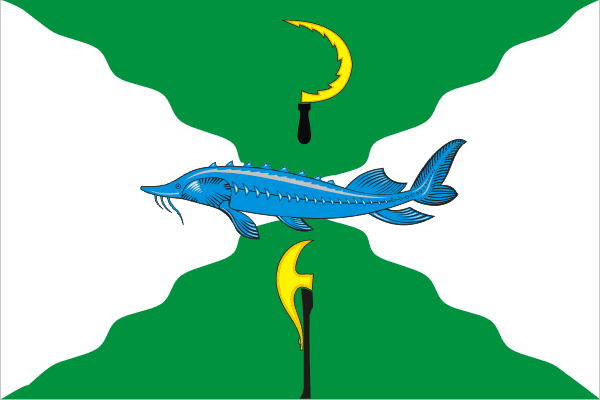
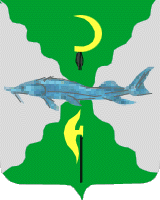
- Flag Coat of arms
- Location of Serebryano-Prudsky District in Moscow Oblast (before July 2012)
- Coordinates: 54°27′N 38°44′E
- Country: Russia
- Federal subject: Moscow Oblast
- Administrative center: Serebryanye Prudy

Area
  - Total: 877.38 km^{2} (338.76 sq mi)

Population (2010 Census)
  - Total: 25,843
  - Density: 29.455/km^{2} (76.287/sq mi)
  - Urban: 37.6%
  - Rural: 62.4%

Administrative structure
  - Administrative divisions: 1 Work settlements, 3 Rural settlements
  - Inhabited localities: 1 urban-type settlements, 81 rural localities

Municipal structure
  - Municipally incorporated as: Serebryano-Prudsky Municipal District
  - Municipal divisions: 1 urban settlements, 3 rural settlements
- Time zone: UTC+3 (MSK)
- OKTMO ID: 46772000
- Website: http://www.silverregion.ru/

Serebryano-Prudsky District (Russian: Серебряно-Прудский райо́н) is an administrative and municipal district (raion), one of the thirty-six in Moscow Oblast, Russia. It is located in the south of the oblast. The area of the district is 877.38 square kilometers (338.76 sq mi). Its administrative center is the urban locality (a work settlement) of Serebryanye Prudy. Population: 25,843 (2010 Census); 24,689 (2002 census); 24,415 (1989 Soviet census). The population of Serebryanye Prudy accounts for 37.6% of the district's total population.
