= Ozyorsky District, Moscow Oblast =

Ozyorsky District Озёрский район (Russian)
- District
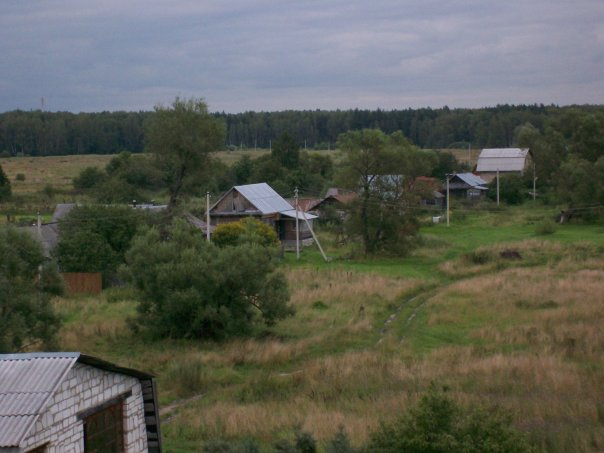
- The village of Patkino in Ozyorsky District

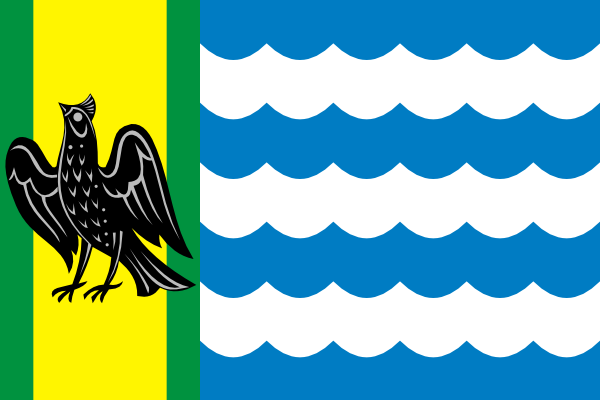
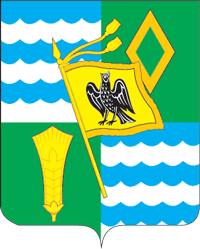
- Flag Coat of arms
- Location of Ozyorsky District in Moscow Oblast (before July 2012)
- Coordinates: 54°54′N 38°33′E
- Country: Russia
- Federal subject: Moscow Oblast
- Established: 2015
- Abolished: May 16, 2015
- Administrative center: Ozyory

Area
  - Total: 549.06 km^{2} (211.99 sq mi)

Population (2010 Census)
  - Total: 35,752
  - Density: 65.115/km^{2} (168.65/sq mi)
  - Urban: 72.2%
  - Rural: 27.8%

Administrative structure
  - Administrative divisions: 1 Towns
  - Inhabited localities: 1 cities/towns, 59 rural localities

Municipal structure
  - Municipally incorporated as: Ozyory Urban Okrug
- Time zone: UTC+3 (MSK)
- OKTMO ID: 46756000
- Website: http://www.admozr.ru

Ozyorsky District (Russian: Озёрский райо́н) was an administrative and municipal district (raion) in Moscow Oblast, Russia. It was located in the south of the oblast. The area of the district was 549.06 square kilometers (211.99 sq mi). Its administrative center was the town of Ozyory. Population: 35,752 (2010 Census); 35,623 (2002 census); 11,783 (1989 Soviet census). The population of Ozyory accounted for 72.2% of the district's total population.

== History ==
Ozyorsky Municipal District was abolished on March 30, 2015, with its territory reorganized as Ozyory Urban Okrug. Within the framework of administrative divisions, on April 13, 2015 the inhabited localities of the low-level administrative divisions (the rural settlements) were subordinated to the Town of Ozyory, which remained the only subdivision of the administrative district. The administrative district itself was abolished on May 16, 2015, with its territory reorganized as Ozyory Town Under Oblast Jurisdiction.
