= Vladimir Andreyev (military officer) =

Soviet and Russian military officer (1942–2025)

- Владимир Иванович Андреев
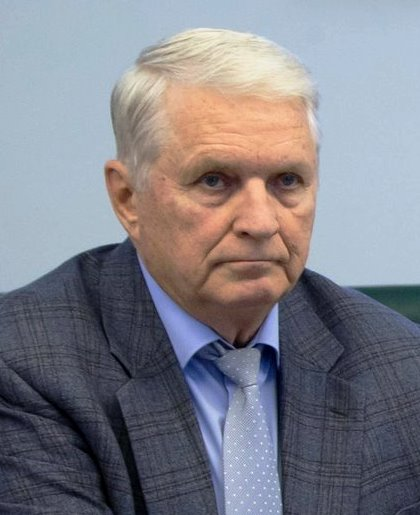
- Born: 3 March 1942; Vologda, Russian SFSR, USSR
- Died: 24 March 2025 (aged 83)
- Military career
- Allegiance: USSR; Russia
- Branch: Soviet Air Defence Forces; Russian Air Defence Forces
- Service years: 1961–1998
- Rank: Colonel General
- Commands: Air Defence Aviation
- Awards: Order of Military Merit; Order of the Red Star; Order "For Service to the Homeland in the Armed Forces of the USSR" Third Class; Order "For Personal Courage"; Honoured Military Pilot of the USSR

Vladimir Ivanovich Andreyev (Russian: Владимир Иванович Андреев; 3 March 1942 – 24 March 2025) was an officer of the Soviet and later Russian Air Defence Forces who rose to the rank of Colonel General of the Aviation and served as commander of the Air Defence Aviation component of the Soviet and later Russian Air Defence Forces between 1987 and 1998.

== Biography ==
Andreyev was born on 3 March 1942 in Vologda, in what was then the Russian Soviet Socialist Federative Republic, in the Soviet Union. His association with flying began in 1957, when, while working as a turner at the Severny Kommunar plant, he enrolled in the gliding department of the Vologda flying club, where he flew more than forty hours on various types of gliders and Yakovlev Yak-18s. In 1960, after turning 18, he entered the flying club's cadet pilot department. From there he studied at the Armavir Higher Military Aviation School of Pilots, graduating in 1965 with a gold medal. On graduating, Andreyev was assigned to the Moscow Air Defence District, where he rose through the positions of senior pilot, flight commander and then aviation squadron commander by 1972, flying the Sukhoi Su-11. In 1972, he was appointed deputy regiment commander, flying the MiG-25P, and had become the regiment's commander by 1975. He was then appointed Deputy Air Defence Corps Commander for Aviation and Chief of Aviation of the Moscow Air Defence District. In 1976, he graduated from the Gagarin Air Force Academy and by 1977 was Chief of Combat Training of Aviation of the Moscow Air Defence District.

In 1977, Andreyev was appointed deputy commander of the 8th Air Defence Army for aviation and Chief of Army Aviation. In 1979, he was appointed Chief of Combat Training of Soviet Air Defence Forces. He enrolled in the Military Academy of the General Staff in 1983, graduating in 1985 and being appointed first deputy commander of the Soviet Air Defence Forces. In 1987, he was advanced to the post of commander of the Air Defence Aviation component of the Soviet Air Defence Forces. In 1990, he was briefly relieved of his post and dismissed after a conflict with the Air Defence Commander-in-Chief Ivan Tretyak, but returned to service in 1991. After the dissolution of the Soviet Union in 1991, Andreyev continued to serve with the successor Russian Air Defence Forces. He went on to organize and personally perform the first flights for in-flight refueling on MiG-31 and Su-30 aircraft. When the Air Defence Forces were merged into the Russian Air Force in 1998, Andreyev was one of those tipped to lead the newly combined organization. When Anatoly Kornukov was instead appointed, Andreyev chose to retire from the Russian Armed Forces in 1998.

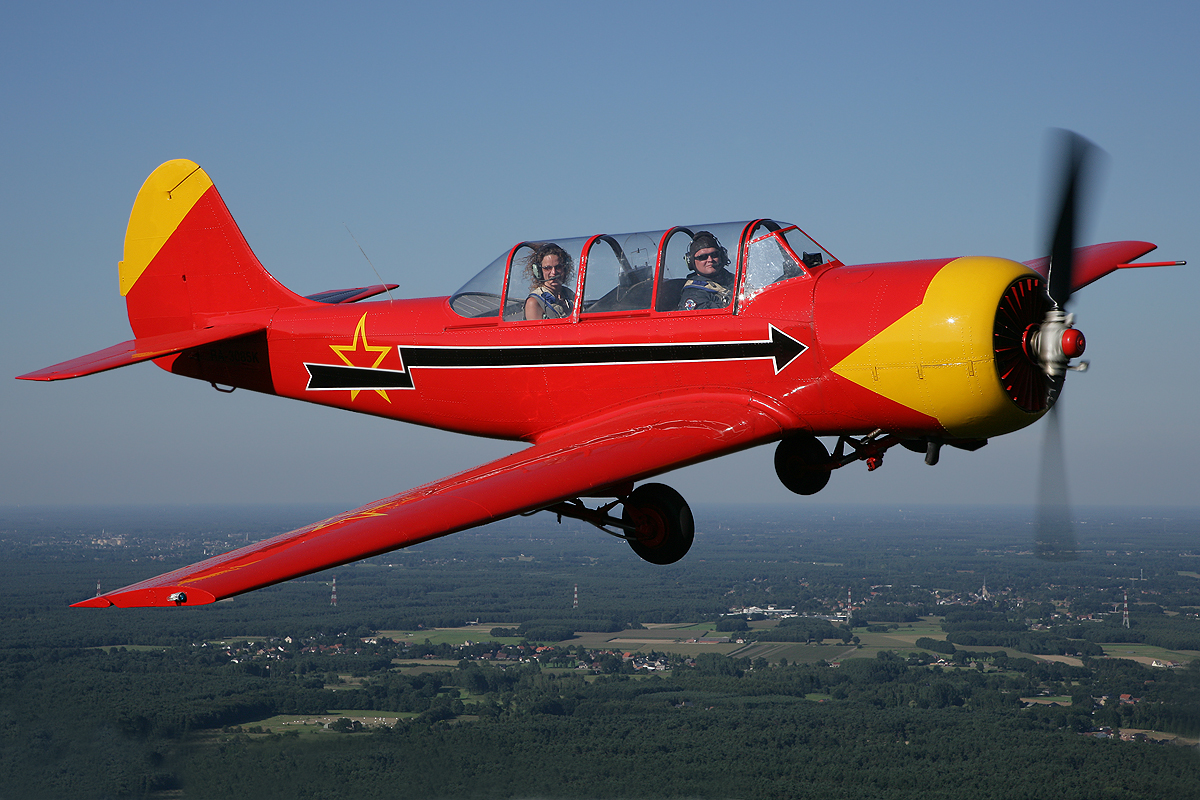
A Yak-52. Andreyev continued to fly these after retiring from military service.

In civilian life Andreyev maintained his connection to flying, being appointed director of the Federal Air Transport Agency in 1999. In this role he laid the groundwork for the creation of the State Air Traffic Management System. He held this position until 2000, and in December 2000 became head of the group of advisers to the general director of Aeroflot. He continued to fly, holding a 1st class commercial pilot certificate, and flying the Yak-52 and Yak-18T since 2001.

Andreyev died on 24 March 2025, at the age of 83 and was buried at the Federal Military Memorial Cemetery on 27 March.

== Awards and honours ==
Over his career Andreyev was rated to fly more than 30 types and modifications of fighter aircraft, including the MiG-17, MiG-19, MiG-29, MiG-31, Su-9, Su-27, and Su-30. He performed flights as a crew commander on a Tu-134, logging more than 3,000 hours in flight time. He was awarded the Order of Military Merit, the Order of the Red Star, the Order "For Service to the Homeland in the Armed Forces of the USSR" Third Class, the Order "For Personal Courage", various medals, and the title of Honoured Military Pilot of the USSR.
