= Lukhovitsky District =

Lukhovitsky District Луховицкий район (Russian)
- District
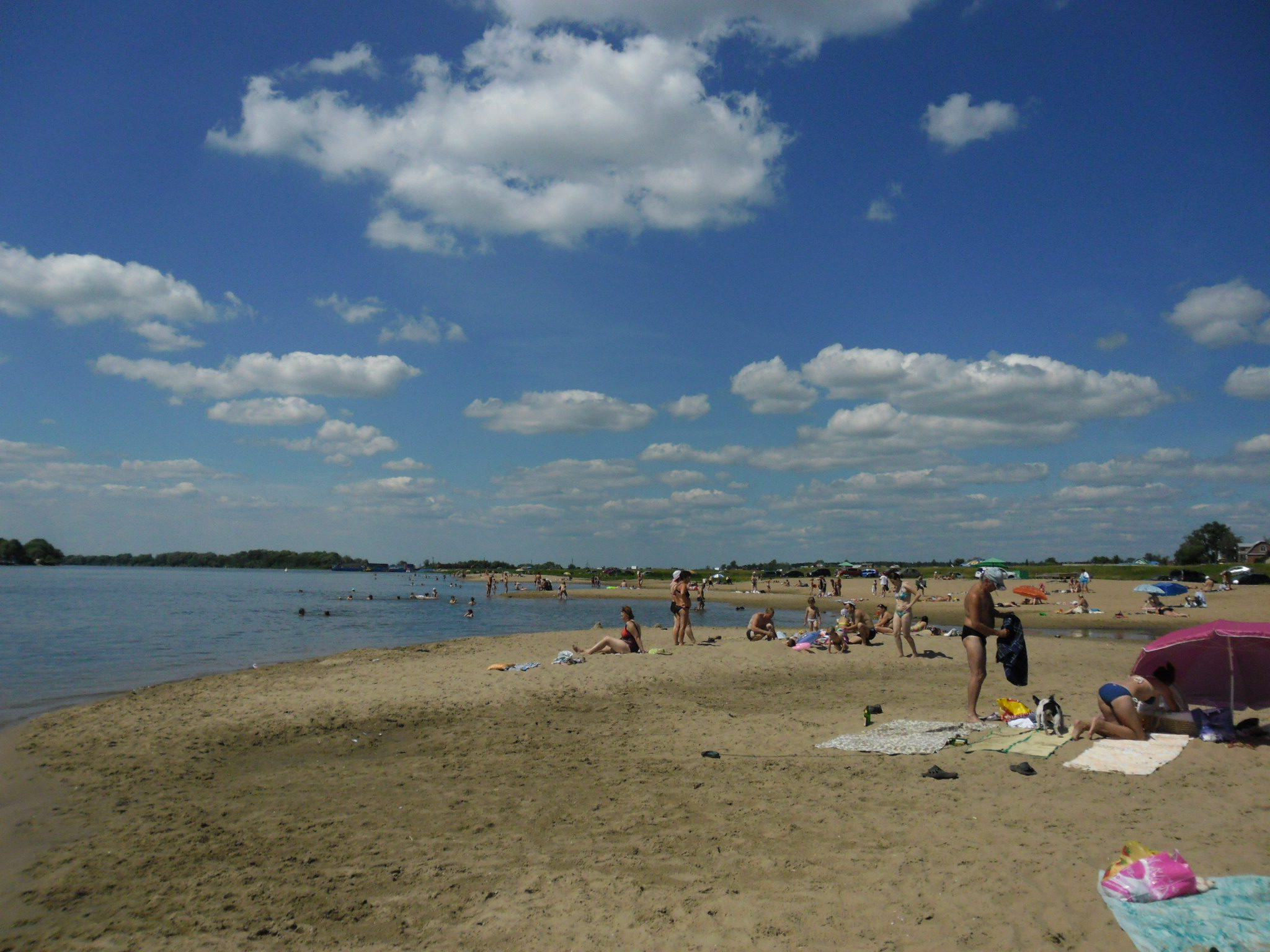
- Recreation in Lukhovitsky District

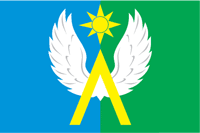
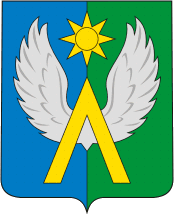
- Flag Coat of arms
- Location of Lukhovitsky District in Moscow Oblast (before July 2012)
- Coordinates: 54°59′N 39°02′E
- Country: Russia
- Federal subject: Moscow Oblast
- Administrative center: Lukhovitsy

Area
  - Total: 1,340.52 km^{2} (517.58 sq mi)

Population (2010 Census)
  - Total: 58,802
  - Density: 43.865/km^{2} (113.61/sq mi)
  - Urban: 61.9%
  - Rural: 38.1%

Administrative structure
  - Administrative divisions: 1 Towns, 1 Work settlements, 6 Rural settlements
  - Inhabited localities: 1 cities/towns, 1 urban-type settlements, 91 rural localities

Municipal structure
  - Municipally incorporated as: Lukhovitsky Municipal District
  - Municipal divisions: 2 urban settlements, 6 rural settlements
- Time zone: UTC+3 (MSK)
- OKTMO ID: 46630000
- Website: http://admlukhovitsy.ru/

Lukhovitsky District (Russian: Лухови́цкий райо́н) is an administrative and municipal district (raion), one of the thirty-six districts in Moscow Oblast, Russia. It is located in the southeast of the oblast. The area of the district is 1,340.52 square kilometers (517.58 sq mi). Its administrative center is the town of Lukhovitsy. Population: 58,802 (2010 Census); 63,235 (2002 census); 65,534 (1989 Soviet census). The population of Lukhovitsy accounts for 50.8% of the district's total population.
