= Yegoryevsky District =

One of two districts in Russia

Location of Altai Krai in Russia

Location of Moscow Oblast in Russia

Yegoryevsky District is the name of several administrative and municipal districts in Russia:

- Yegoryevsky District, Altai Krai, an administrative and municipal district of Altai Krai
- Yegoryevsky District, Moscow Oblast, an administrative and municipal district of Moscow Oblast

== See also ==
- Yegoryevsky (disambiguation)
