= Anna Mikhailovna Kaptsova =

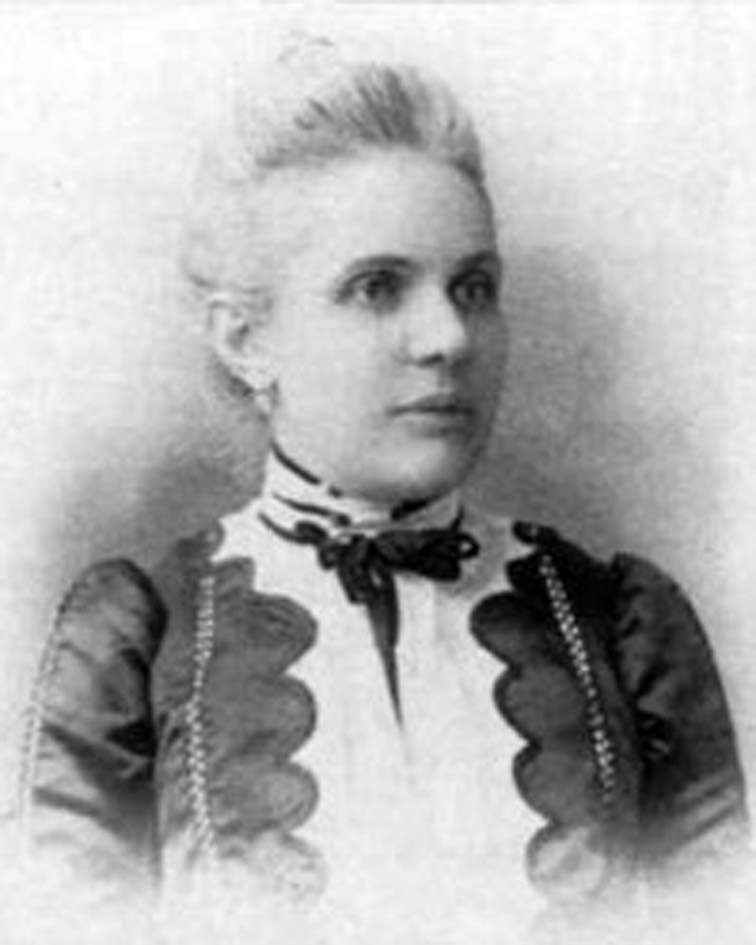
- Born: June 4, 1860; Moscow, Russian Empire
- Died: December 16, 1927 (aged 67); Moscow, USSR
- Occupation: Industrialist
- Spouse: Alexander Sergeevich Kaptsov

Anna Mikhailovna Kaptsova (June 4, 1860 – December 16, 1927), was a Russian industrialist and philanthropist. She was the president of the Kaptsov Trading Company from 1897. She founded a silk-weaving manufacturing business in the village of Fryazino.

== Family ==
Anna Mikhailovna's father, Mikhail Vasilyevich Zalogin (born 1822) was a Moscow second guild merchant. Together with his brothers, Zagolin owned the Fryanovskaya wool-spinning factory. Anna Mikhailovna's mother was Alexandra Ivanovna (born 1829-?).[1][2].

Anna Mikhailovna married Alexander Sergeevich Kaptsov (1849-1897), a Moscow first guild merchant, philanthropist and member of the Moscow City Duma.

Anna Mikhailovna and Alexander Sergeevich had three sons:

- Nikolai (1883-1966), co-owner of the Anna Kaptsova and Sons partnership, then of N. A. Kaptsov with his brothers. After stopping commercial activities he became a scientist in the field of electronics and a professor at the physics department of Moscow State University.[3]
- Sergei (1885-1932) graduated from Heidelberg University and Moscow State University, was a mineralogist and an amateur racing driver. Repressed.
- Mikhail (1888 - 1931) graduated from a university in England, was the owner of a car store, and a representative of the Opel concern. Arrested in the Industrial Party Trial and later shot.

In 2006, Sergei and Mikhail were rehabilitated[1][4].

== Factory in Fryazino ==
In 1900, the Anna Kaptsova and Sons partnership bought the Kondrashevs' silk weaving factory and in its place built the first three-story stone building in Fryazino, with electric lighting and machines imported from abroad. The factory provided work for almost all of Fryazino's residents. The cost of fixed capital was 561.6 thousand rubles (equivalent to approximately US$28,600, or $1,081,000 in 2024).

In 1918, the factory was nationalized and closed a year later. In 1933, NPP Istok established the Radiolamp microwave electronics plant on the site of the former factory. Kaptsova's son Nikolai, who was the main owner of the factory before its nationalization, collaborated with NPP Istok after becoming a physics professor at Moscow State University. [2] [3].

== Other enterprises ==
Anna Mikhailovna had a large silk fabric store in Moscow, located in the Bogorodsky district with a center in the village of Kruttsy. The store operated a network of distribution offices, which issued orders to homeworkers and small factories and provided them with yarn. According to some sources, up to 70 percent of Russian plush and velvet passed through Kruttsy.

In 1910, she, together with G. M. Morozov, bought the silk weaving factory in the village of Trubino of the trading house “Bocharov I. F. and Sons”, which was in a difficult financial situation, left Bocharov there as manager, but soon left this enterprise [2].

== Legacy ==
Anna Mikhailovna's husband, Alexander Sergeevich, founded and maintained two schools in Moscow with his own money. In the first, male, trustee was A. S. Kaptsov himself. In the second, women's, A. M. Kaptsova. After the death of her husband, Anna Mikhailovna, by decision of the Moscow City Duma on September 2, 1897, became a trustee of both schools, and until November 1917 she financed them and supervised their activities. In 1996, Moscow gymnasium No. 1520, transformed into a school whose history dates back to these schools, was named after the Kaptsovs.
