= Kashira (disambiguation) =

Kashira is a town in Kashirsky District of Moscow Oblast, Russia.

Kashira may also refer to:

- Kashira Urban Settlement, a municipal formation which the Town of Kashira in Kashirsky District of Moscow Oblast, Russia is incorporated as
- Kashira Highway, a major street in Moscow, Russia
- Kashira Power Plant, a coal-fired power plant in Kashira, Russia
- Kashira Bus Terminal, a bus terminal in Moscow Oblast, Russia operated by Mostransavto
- Kashira, a component in Japanese sword mountings
- Kashira, the three disembodied head spirits in Spirited Away
