= Artem Chernobay =

Russian chess player (born 1989)

Personal information
- Born: Artem Vyacheslavovich Chernobay; June 11, 1989 (age 37) Fryazino, Moscow Oblast, Russian SFSR, Soviet Union

Chess career
- Title: International Master (2011)
- FIDE rating: 2454 (September 2026)
- Peak rating: 2515 (July 2018)

Artem Vyacheslavovich Chernobay (Russian: Артем Вячеславович Чернобай; born 11 June 1989) is a Russian chess International Master (IM). An active competitor in regional and national Russian circuits, he achieved his peak FIDE classical rating of 2515 in July 2018.Chernobay earned his International Master title from FIDE in 2011 after crossing the required rating thresholds and securing international norms.

He frequently represents the Moscow Oblast region in team events, competing in high-level tournaments such as the Russian Team Championships. Throughout his career, he has competed in classical, rapid, and blitz formats against prominent international players.

== Early life and education ==
Chernobay was born in Fryazino, a town in the Moscow Oblast known for its strong chess community. He learned to play chess at the age of six and quickly excelled, becoming a frequent podium finisher in regional and national junior circuits.

Despite his success in chess, Chernobay prioritized a career in medicine after completing secondary school. In 2010, he graduated from the Faculty of Social Medicine at the Maimonides State Classical Academy, specializing in general medicine. He subsequently completed three years of postgraduate residency training in the department of abdominal surgery at the M. F. Vladimirsky Moscow Regional Research Clinical Institute (MONIKI).

== Chess career ==
Chernobay managed to maintain a competitive chess career while undergoing rigorous medical training:

- 2010: He won the Moscow Oblast Men's Chess Championship.
- 2011: He won Tournament "A" at the prestigious "Victory Day" chess festival. Following his strong international performances and fulfilling the rating requirements, FIDE officially awarded him the Grandmaster title in 2011.
- Team Competitions: Chernobay has been a long-time member of the Moscow Oblast team. He competed in the Russian Premier League Team Championships in 2014, 2018, and 2019, playing matches against high-profile grandmasters such as Peter Svidler.
- 2023: He competed internationally at the 23rd Dubai Open Chess Tournament, facing top grandmasters including Yu Yangyi.

== Coaching ==
Since 2014, Chernobay has been actively engaged in coaching alongside his medical practice. He has trained several junior players who went on to place in youth world championships.
