= Fryazino =

Town in Moscow Oblast, Russia

Fryazino Фрязино
- Town
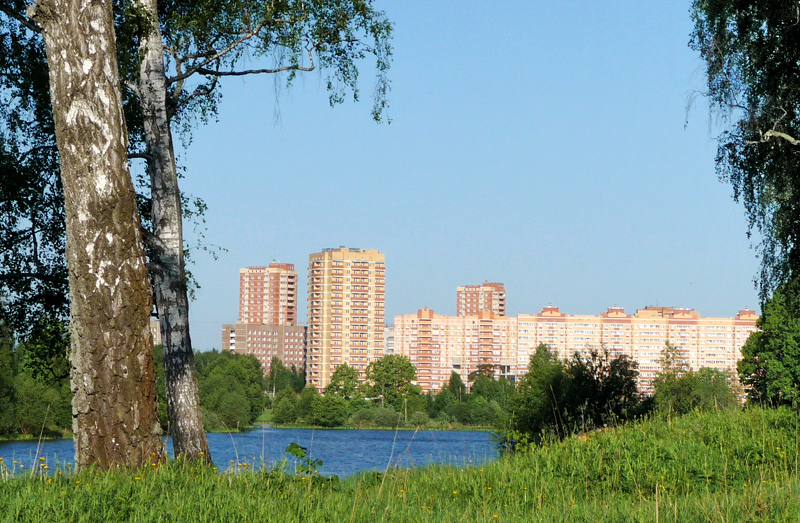
- View of Fryazino

- Flag Coat of arms
- Interactive map of Fryazino
- Location of Fryazino Fryazino (Moscow Oblast)
- Coordinates: 55°57′N 38°03′E
- Country: Russia
- Federal subject: Moscow Oblast
- Founded: 1584
- Town status since: 1951

Government
  - Body: Council of Deputies
  - Head: Konstantin Bocharov
- Elevation: 165 m (541 ft)

Population (2010 Census)
  - Total: 55,369
  - Estimate (2025): 58,535 (+5.7%)
  - Rank: 299th in 2010

Administrative status
  - Subordinated to: Fryazino Town Under Oblast Jurisdiction
  - Capital of: Fryazino Town Under Oblast Jurisdiction

Municipal status
  - Urban okrug: Fryazino Urban Okrug
  - Capital of: Fryazino Urban Okrug
- Time zone: UTC+3 (MSK)
- Postal code: 141190
- Dialing code: +7 49656
- OKTMO ID: 46780000001
- Town Day: Observed in fall
- Website: www.fryazino.org

Fryazino (Russian: Фрязино, IPA: [ˈfrʲæzʲɪnə]) is a science town in Moscow Oblast, Russia, located on the Lyuboseyevka River, a tributary of the Vorya, 25 kilometers (16 mi) northeast of the city of Moscow. Population: 60,580 (2021 census); 55,369 (2010 census); 52,436 (2002 census); 53,317 (1989 Soviet census).

Fryazino is a center of excellence for Russian microwave electronics.

== History ==
In 1584–1856, the villages of Grebnevo, Fryazinovka, and Chizhovo stood on the territory occupied by modern Fryazino. Silk-weaving manufactures were established here in the second half of the 18th century.

The first mention of Fryazino was in the 1584–1586 cadastres of Moskovsky Uyezd: "Villages of Fryazinova and Samsonov as well on the river of Lyubosivka, and it includes plowed gray land tillage 4 desiatinas and of fallow 13.5 desiatinas in the field and the same in two (implying: cultivated fields), hay 10 haycocks, firewood forest, 5 acres" (Russian: дер. Фрязинова, а Самсонова тоже на рчк. на Любосивке, а в ней пашни паханые серой земли 8 четьи да перелогу 27 четв. в поле, а в дву потому ж, сена 10 коп, лесу дровяняного 5 дес). Then the village belonged to the demesne of Bogdan Belsky.

- 1791 — the temple Theotokos of Grebnevo was built.
- 1868 — the village Fryazino.
- 1938 — work settlement Fryazino.
- 1951 — it was granted town status.
- 1968 Fryazino received the status of regional subordination.
- December 29, 2003, Presidential decree granted Fryazino the status of the Scientific town of the Russian Federation.
- October 28, 2009, in Fryazino under the chairmanship of President of Russia Dmitry Medvedev held a meeting of the Commission for Modernization and Technological Development of Russian Economy.

== Administrative and municipal status ==
Within the framework of administrative divisions, it is, together with one rural locality, incorporated as Fryazino Town Under Oblast Jurisdiction—an administrative unit with the status equal to that of the districts. As a municipal division, Fryazino Town Under Oblast Jurisdiction is incorporated as Fryazino Urban Okrug.

== Economy ==
In 1901, Anna Kaptsova founded the big silk-weaving manufacture in the village of Fryazino. It was the first stone building in the village (nationalized in 1918, closed in 1929).

In 1933, in a former silk-weaving factory was founded the Radiolampa plant. Since that time Fryazino became the center of the Soviet electronics industry. The first Research Institute SRI-160 (its modern name is Federal State Unitary Enterprise RPC "Istok") was founded in Fryazino in 1943, then their number increases to five. Branch of the Institute of Radio-engineering and Electronics was founded in Fryazino in 1955.

In Soviet times, growing enterprises had been working within a military reservation institute. With the collapse of the Soviet Union, these institutions were forced to cut most of their staff. Currently, a large part of the population of Fryazino works in Moscow.

By way of defense conversion research institutes were established the following enterprises: in 1993 — "Istok-Sistema", a manufacturer of medical equipment under the brand name "Gastroscan", in 1994 — "Istok-Audio", a manufacturer of hearing aids. In addition to the electronic and medical industry in the town is a confectionery industry, as well as a tea-packing factory of the company "May". The town also has furniture factories.

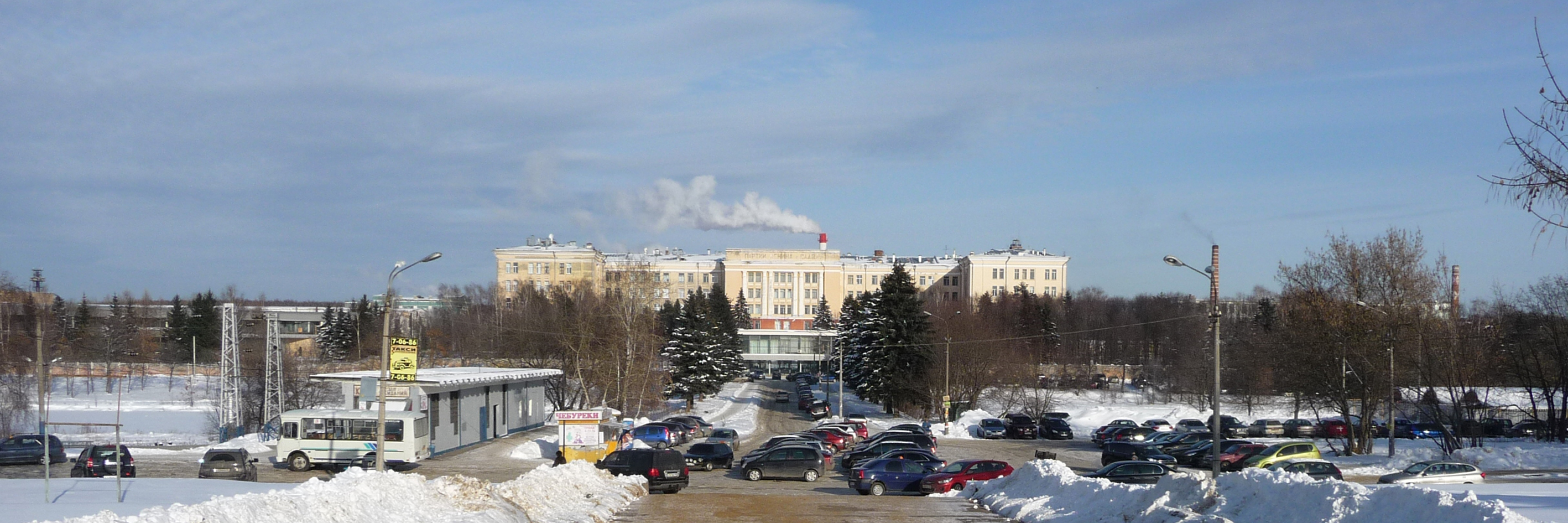
In the center background, the main building of RPC "Istok". Left - a one-story station building "Fryazino-Passenger", on the left of which is the railway line to Moscow. Behind it - a snow-covered frozen pond on the Lyuboseyevka River

== Education ==
A first school was opened in Fryazino in 1912. There are 7 schools, including 5 secondary, a gymnasium and lyceum in the town now. By the end of 1980, 20% of the population of Fryazino had a higher education, among them — 460 Candidates of Sciences and 77 Doctors of Sciences, 2 Full Members of the USSR Academy of Sciences, 120 winners of the Lenin and State prizes.

== Architecture and sights ==
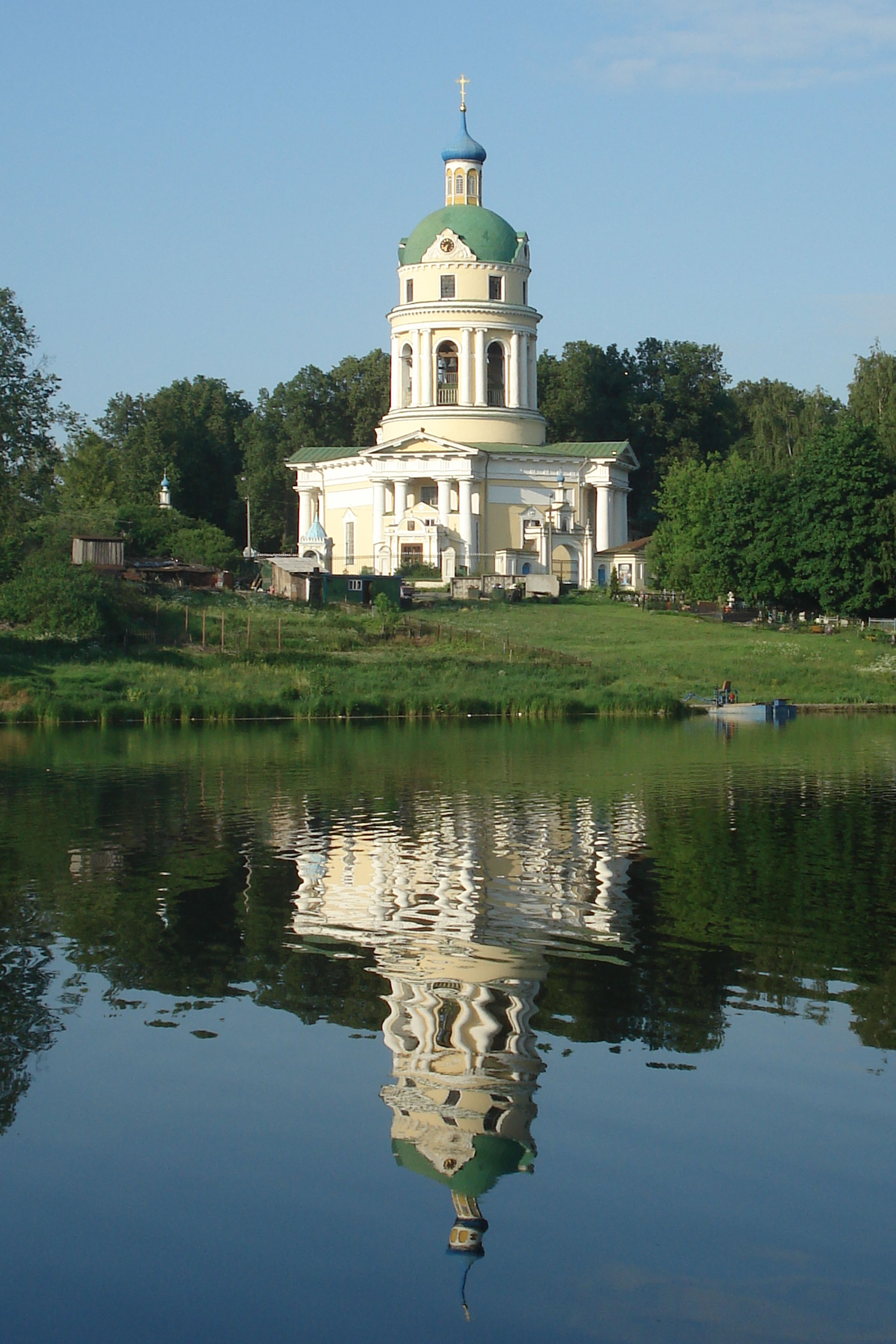
Saint Nicholas' Church (1823) in the historic estate of Grebnevo near Fryazino

On the eastern outskirts of the town, on the banks of the Lyuboseyevka river, is the historic estate of Grebnevo (1780–1790; reconstructed in 1817-1823). Also, the Alley of Heroes is in the center of the downtown, on which there are the busts Heroes of the Soviet Union from Fryazino who participated in World War II: Alexandr Dudkin, Boris Yeryashev, Ivan Ivanov. Another monument is "Stella wins" that indicates the names of all of residents Fryazino who participated in World War II. There are some museums: the Town Museum, Ivan Ivanov's Home, the Literary Museum of Osip Mandelstam and other.

== Transportation and communications ==
There are two ways you can get to Fryazino by public transport from Moscow :

- by train from Yaroslavsky Rail Terminal, in about 1 hour 15 min
- by minibus or coach (№ 361, № 335) from the Moscow Central Bus Terminal (around Moscow underground station Shcholkovskaya) in about 45 minutes, except for peak hours.

The town is located on the Fryanovo motorway P-110 (Schyolkovo — Fryanovo) at a distance of 7 km from the beginning of the motorway. The town has a new bus station, located on the Polevaya str. There are three town bus lines and the same taxi. In addition, through the town are 10 commuter bus routes (including those from Moscow). Inside the town there are several different taxi services.

Also in town there is a railway station and two passenger platforms (Fryazino-Commodity and Fryazino-Passenger, which is finite).

Fryazino has quite ramified computer network Fryazino.net.

== Notable people ==
- Alexander Balandin (born 1953), cosmonaut
- Nikolay Devyatkov (1907–2001), engineer/inventor
- Yury Gulyayev (born 1935), physicist
- Aleksey Kuleshov (born 1979), volleyball player
- Stanislav Petrov (1939–2017), military officer
- Alexander Zaitsev (1945–2021), astronomer
