= Grebnevo, Moscow Oblast =

Rural locality in Shchyolkovsky District, Moscow Oblast, Russia

Coordinates: 55°57′56″N 38°05′13″E

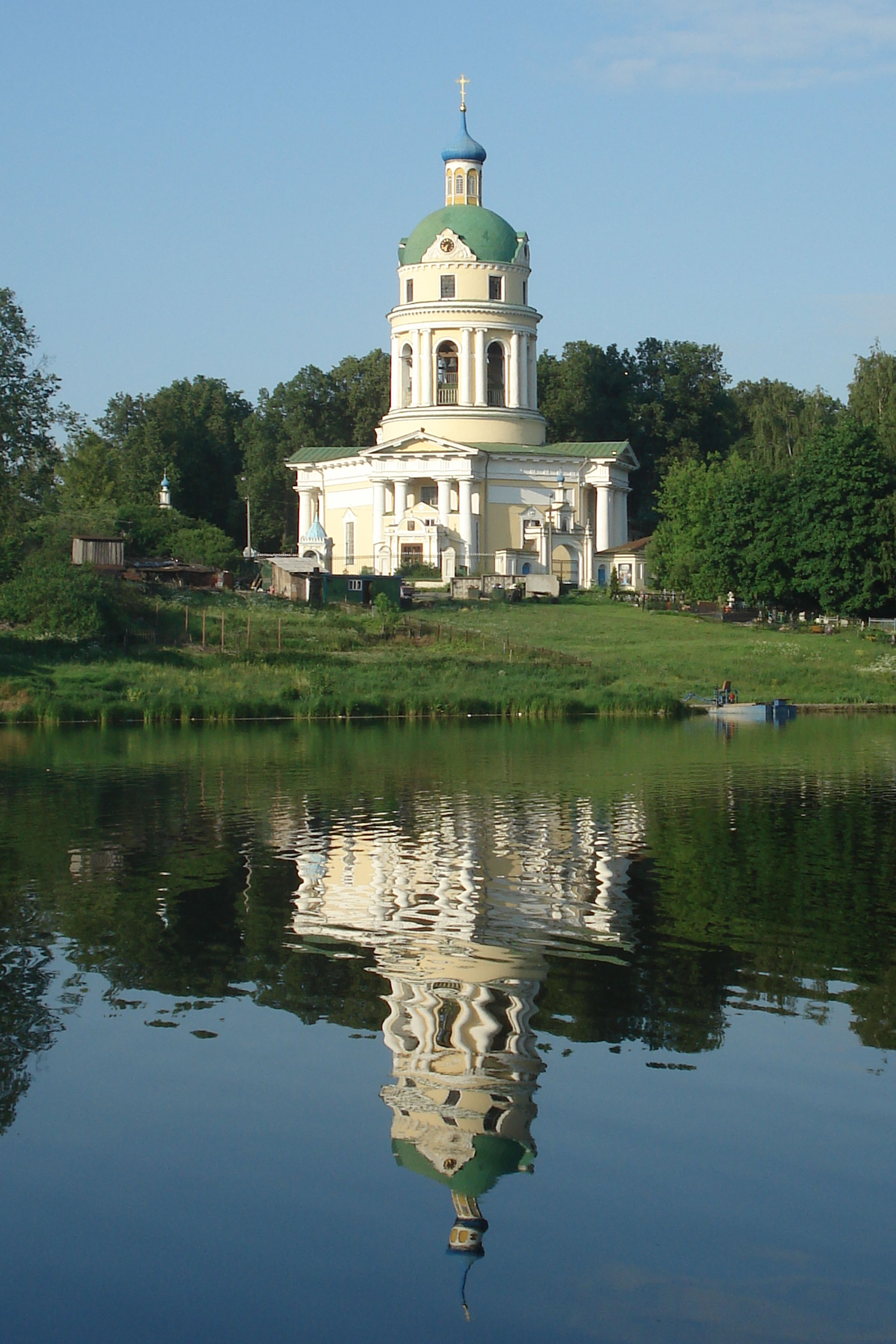
St. Nicholas' Church (1823)

Grebnevo (Russian: Гребнево) is a rural locality (a selo) in Shchyolkovsky District of Moscow Oblast, Russia, located about 30 kilometers (19 mi) east of Moscow, on the outskirt of the town of Fryazino, on the bank of the Lyuboseyevka River.

== History ==
Best known for its historical manor, Grebnevo served as a country seat of the Galitzine, Trubetskoy, and Bibikov noble families. Among the early owners were Bogdan Belsky and Dmitry Troubetskoy. The last Russian boyar, Ivan Trubetskoy, gave the property to his daughter Anastasia, the wife of Prince Dimitrie Cantemir, whose daughter Catherine further expanded the estate. Mikhail Kheraskov, the foremost poet of Catherine the Great's time, was the next owner. It was in Grebnevo that he completed the Rossiad, arguably the longest Russian poem.

In the late 19th century, the estate was owned by a merchant family which built several small factories on the grounds. Fyodor Grinevsky, one of Moscow's most popular physicians, bought Grebnevo in 1913. He operated the property as a sanatorium until the October Revolution, after which the estate was nationalized for Bolshevik leaders.

In 1960, the Grebnevo estate was declared to be a museum. In the 1990s and 2000s, the palace survived several fires. Apart from the churches, the manor is currently in a state of disrepair following decades of neglect during the Soviet era.

== Architecture ==
The surviving Neoclassical buildings were constructed between the 1780s and 1830s by Major General Gavrila Bibikov and Prince Sergei Mikhailovich (1774–1859). These include the palatial house of three stories with the six-columned portico (1790s), the Doric entrance gate resembling a Roman triumphal arch (1821), and two Neoclassical churches. An elaborate network of ponds also dates from that period.

The blood-red church (1791) is the earlier of the two. It is dedicated to the Theotokos of Grebnevo, an icon reportedly presented to Dmitry Donskoy after the Battle of Kulikovo. "Its four arms finish in elegant porticoes with pediments under a domed rotunda over which a shining gilded angel holds the cross".
