= Lyuboseyevka =

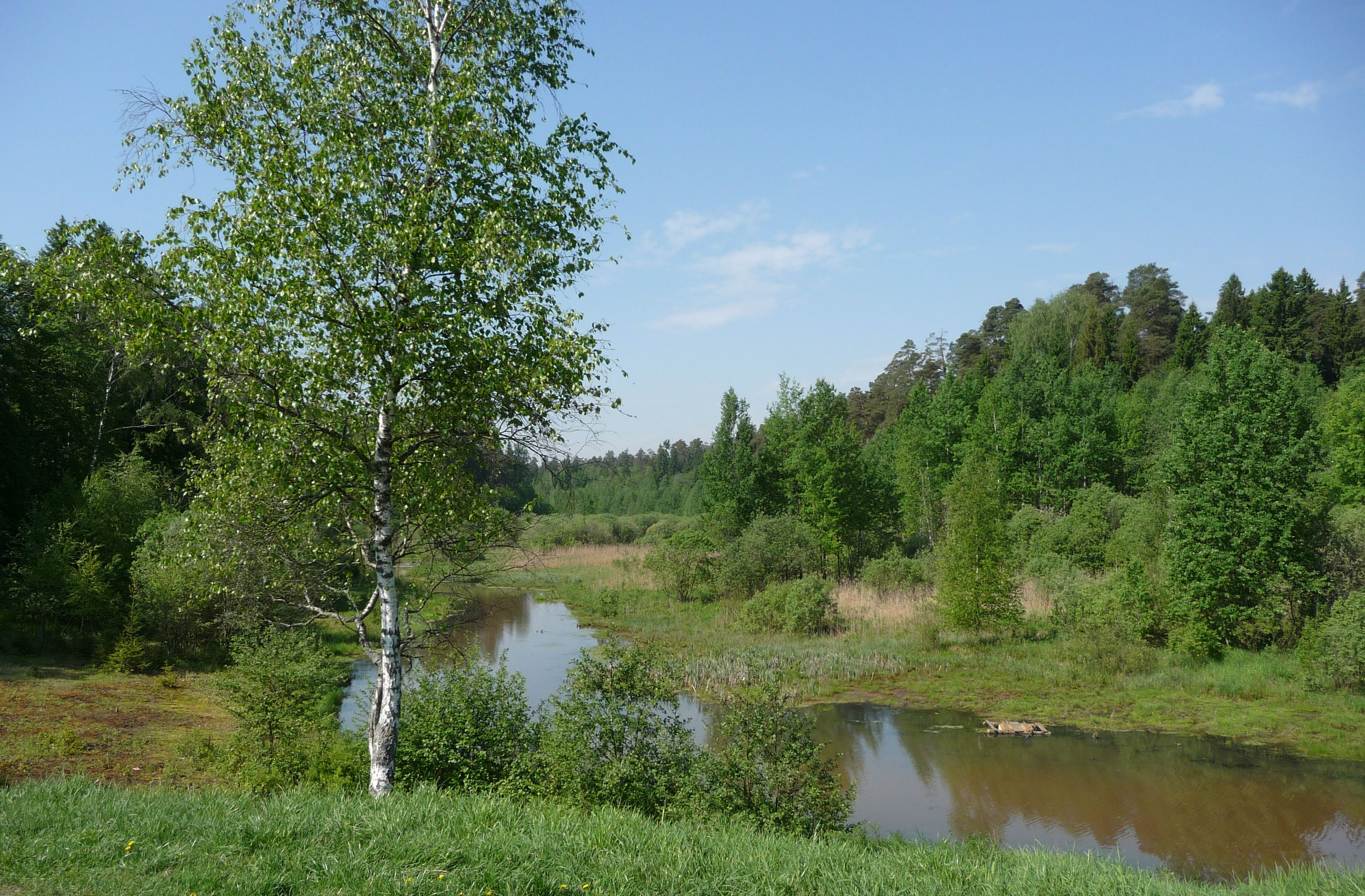
- The Lyuboseyevka in the vicinity of the settlement of Mednoye-Vlasovo
- Native name: Любосеевка (Russian)

Location
- Country: Russia
- Region: Moscow Oblast
- District: Shchyolkovsky District
- City: Fryazino

Physical characteristics
- Source
  - location: near the town of Fryazino
- Mouth: Vorya
  - location: near the settlement of Mednoye-Vlasovo, Shchyolkovsky District
  - coordinates: 55.9313°N 38.2131°E
- Length: 12 km (7.5 mi)

Basin features
- Progression: Vorya→ Klyazma→ Oka→ Volga→ Caspian Sea

The Lyuboseyevka (Russian: Любосе́евка) is a river in Moscow Oblast, Russia. It is a right tributary of the Vorya. It is 12 km in length. Its source is near the town of Fryazino. From source to mouth it flows to the east, passing the manor of Grebnevo and entering the Vorya near the settlement of Mednoye-Vlasovo.
