= Moscow Central Bus Terminal =

Bus station in Moscow, Russia

- Центральный автовокзал
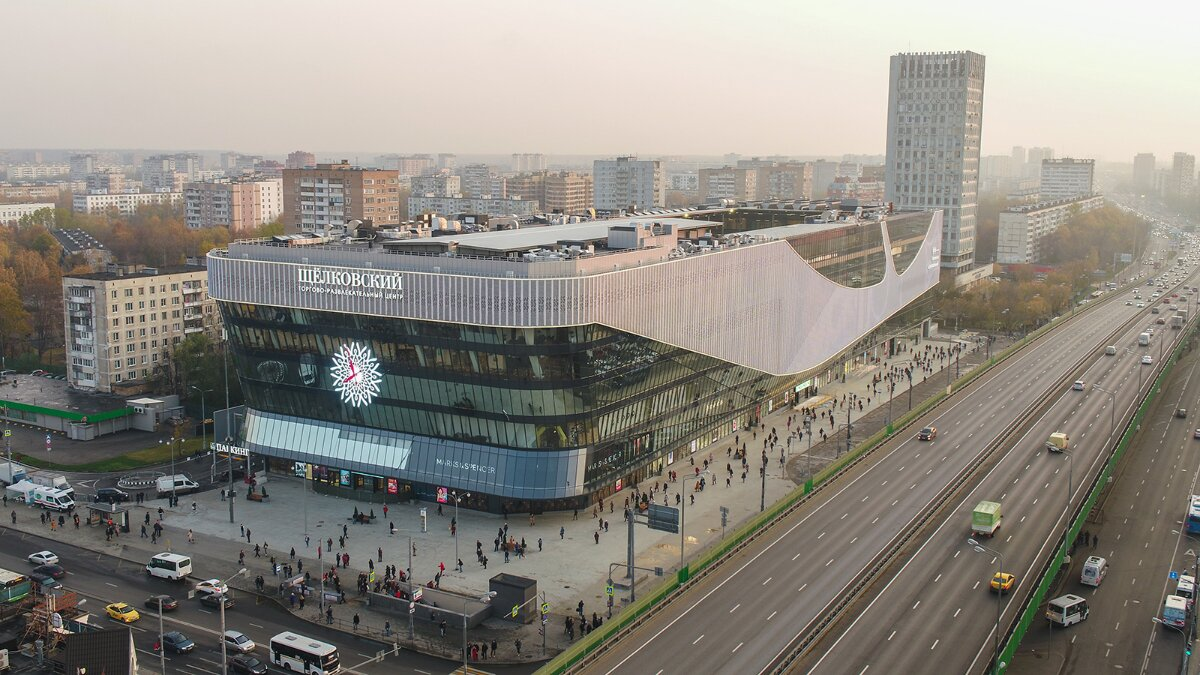

General information
- Status: Completed
- Type: bus terminal
- Location: Moscow, Russia
- Coordinates: 55°48′40″N 37°48′00″E
- Years built: 1971 (old building); 2020 (new building)
- Owner: Mostransavto

The Moscow Central Bus Terminal (Russian: Центральный автовокзал) is a bus terminal in Moscow for long-range and intercity passenger buses with daily overturn of about 25 thousand passengers serving about 40% of long-range bus routes in Moscow. Situated near Shchyolkovskaya Metro station. It is owned by a state Mostransavto company.

== History ==
=== Old building ===
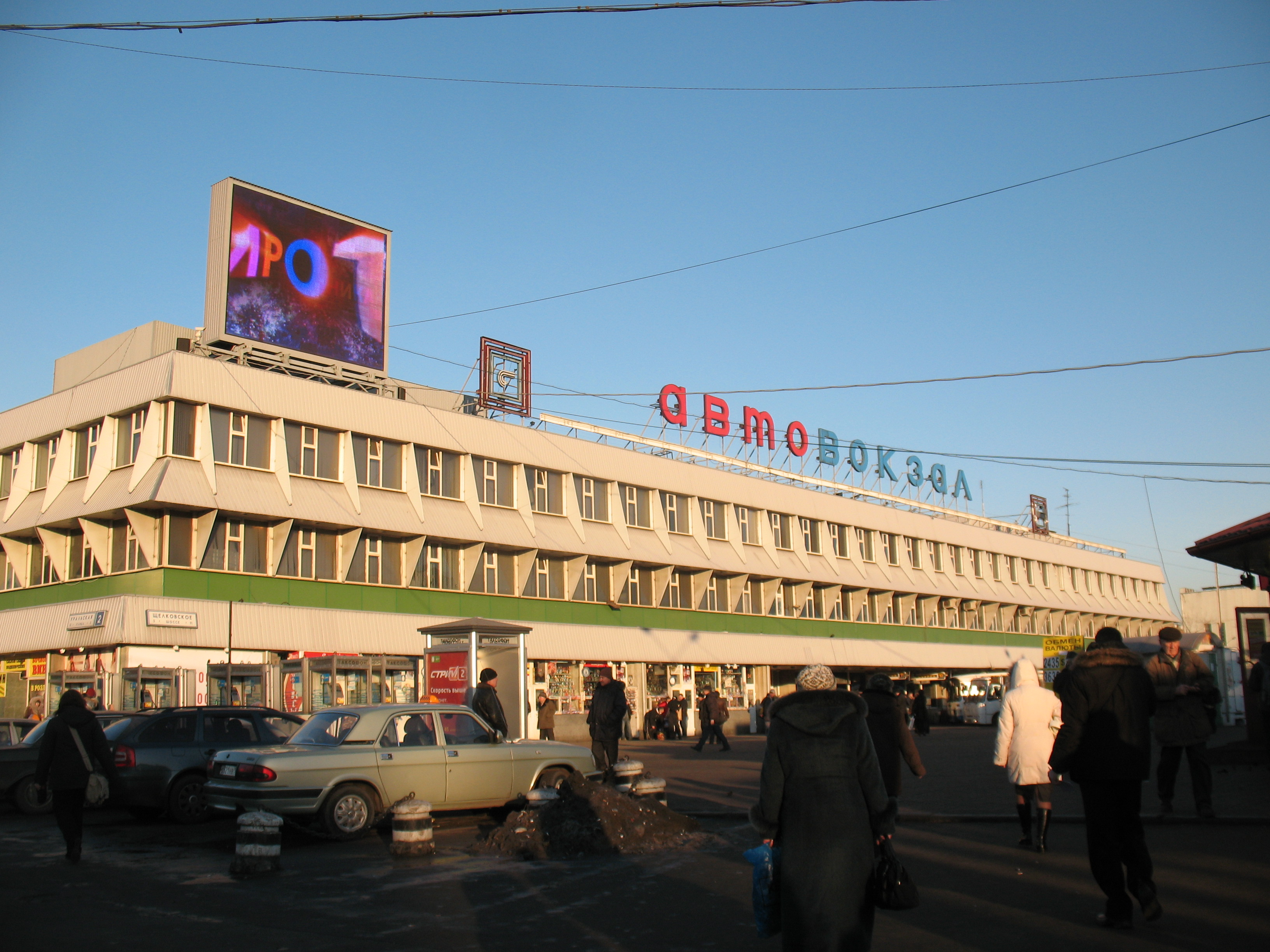
Old bus station building in 2008

The bus terminal building was built in 1971 to a design by architect Rochegov, and in 1997 a significant reconstruction of the building took place. The bus terminal no longer met safety and comfort requirements, so in January 2017, the Moscow City Architecture Committee approved the project for a new building. According to this project, a multifunctional complex combining a bus terminal and a shopping and entertainment area is to appear on the site of the former bus terminal.

Demolition work on the bus terminal started on 14 June 2017, with completion scheduled for late 2018-early 2019, then moved to late 2019, then pushed back to Q1 2020.

=== New building ===
The new building was scheduled to open in October 2020, which was carried out by the Mayor of Moscow together with the Governor of Moscow Region on 29 October 2020. Bus traffic was gradually restored throughout November-December 2020.
