= Pruzhonka =

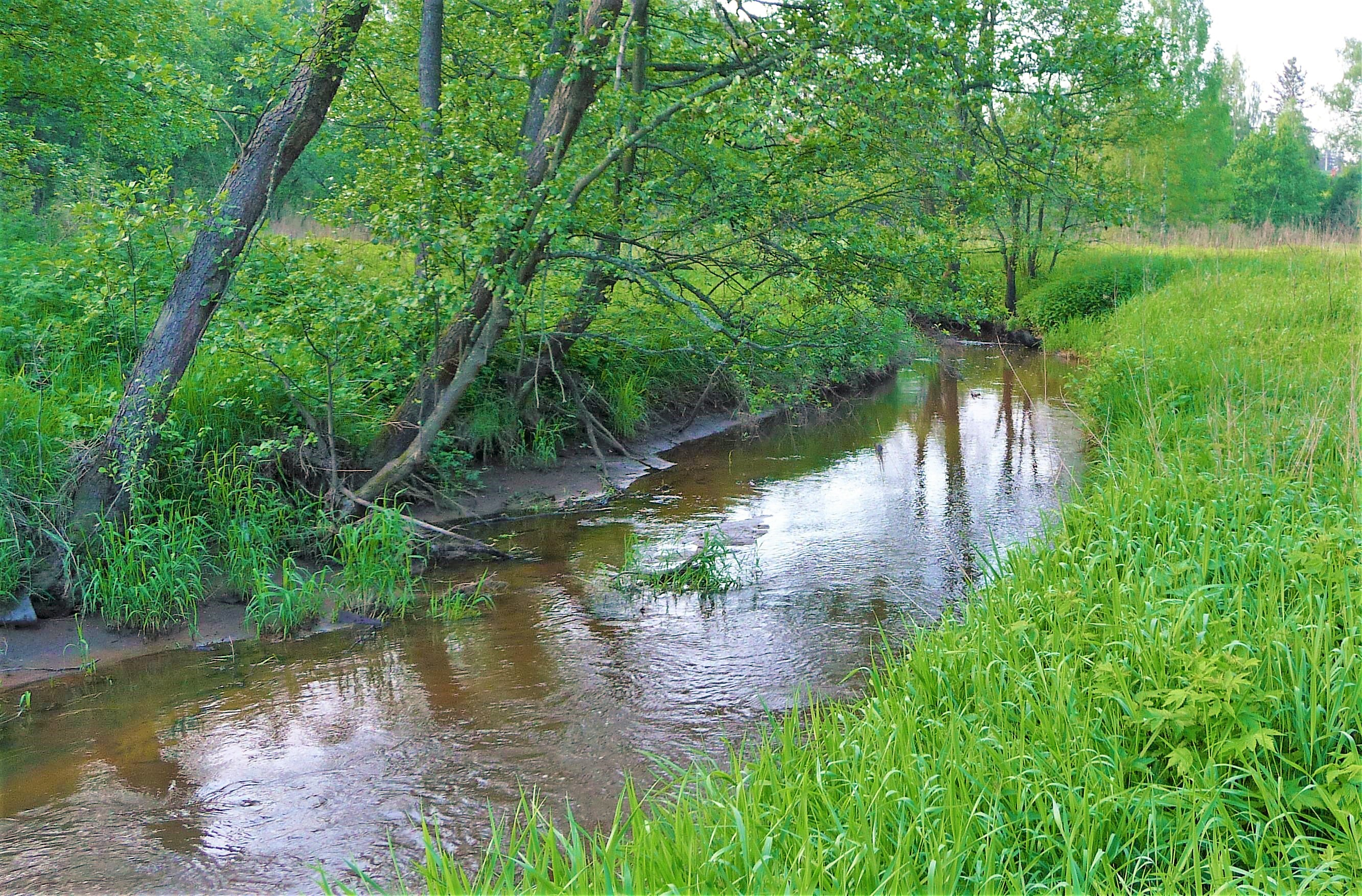
- Native name: Пружёнка (Russian)

Location
- Country: Russia
- Region: Moscow Oblast
- District: Shchyolkovsky District, Noginsky District

Physical characteristics
- Source
  - location: near the village of Petrovskoye, Shchyolkovsky District
- Mouth: Vorya
  - location: near the village of Mizinovo, Shchyolkovsky District
  - coordinates: 55.9518°N 38.2151°E
- Length: 31 km (19 mi)
- Basin size: 117 km^{2} (45 sq mi)

Basin features
- Progression: Vorya → Klyazma→ Oka→ Volga→ Caspian Sea

The Pruzhonka (Russian: Пружёнка) is a river in Moscow Oblast, Russia. It is a left tributary of the Vorya. It is 31 kilometres (19 mi) long, and has a drainage basin of 117 square kilometres (45 sq mi). The source of the Pruzhonka is near the village of Petrovskoye, in Shchyolkovsky District of Moscow Oblast. The main direction of its flow is to the south and south-east, entering the Vorya near the village of Mizinovo.
