= Kruttsy =

Kruttsy Крутцы
- Village
- Location within Vladimir Oblast Location within Russia
- Coordinates: 55°15′N 41°36′E
- Country: Russia
- Region: Vladimir Oblast
- District: Melenkovsky District
- Time zone: UTC+3:00

Kruttsy (Russian: Крутцы) is a rural locality (a village) in Ilkinskoye Rural Settlement, Melenkovsky District, Vladimir Oblast, Russia. The population was 372 as of 2010. There are 4 streets.

== Geography ==
Kruttsy is located on the Unzha River, 10 km south of Melenki (the district's administrative centre) by road. Voynovo is the nearest rural locality.
