= Vorya (Klyazma) =

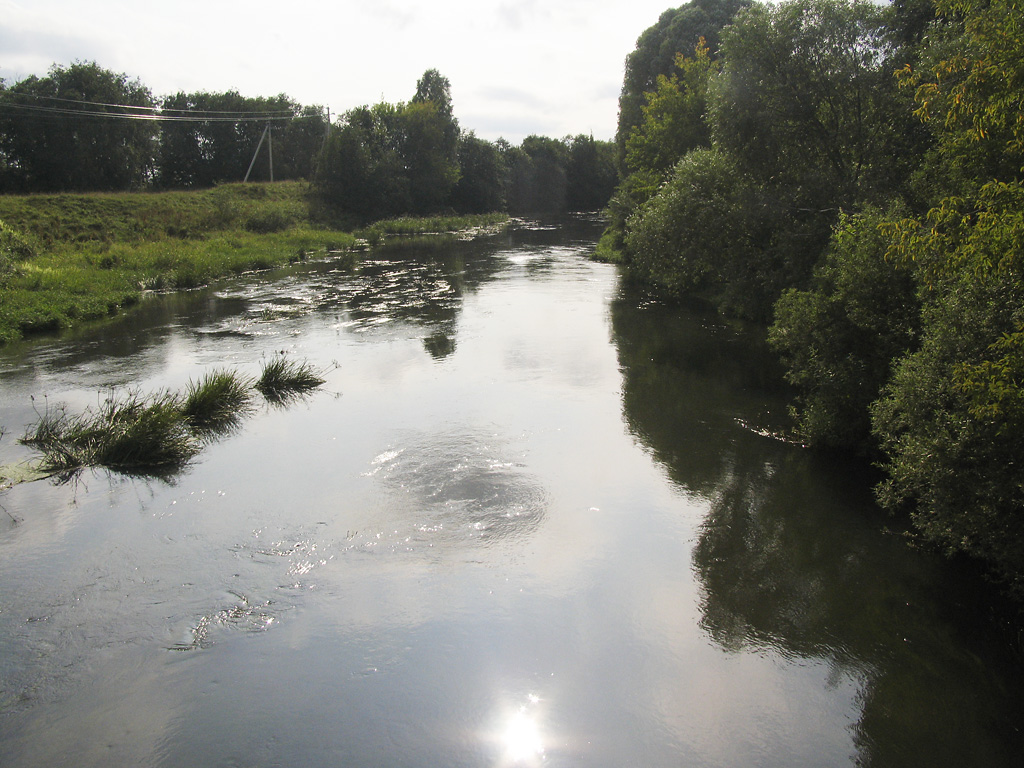
- Native name: Воря (Russian)

Location
- Country: Russia

Physical characteristics
- Mouth: Klyazma
  - coordinates: 55°52′35″N 38°12′49″E
- Length: 108 km (67 mi)
- Basin size: 1,220 km^{2} (470 sq mi)

Basin features
- Progression: Klyazma→ Oka→ Volga→ Caspian Sea

The Vorya (Russian: Во́ря) is a river in Moscow Oblast, Russia. It is a left tributary of the Klyazma (Volga's basin through the Oka). It is 102 kilometres (63 mi) long, and has a drainage basin of 1,220 square kilometres (470 sq mi).

Major tributaries: left — Pazha, Torgosha and Pruzhonka, Zhmuchka; right — Talitsa, Lyuboseyevka and Lashutka.
