= Mostransavto =

Mostransavto is a state-owned bus company in Moscow Oblast, Russia.

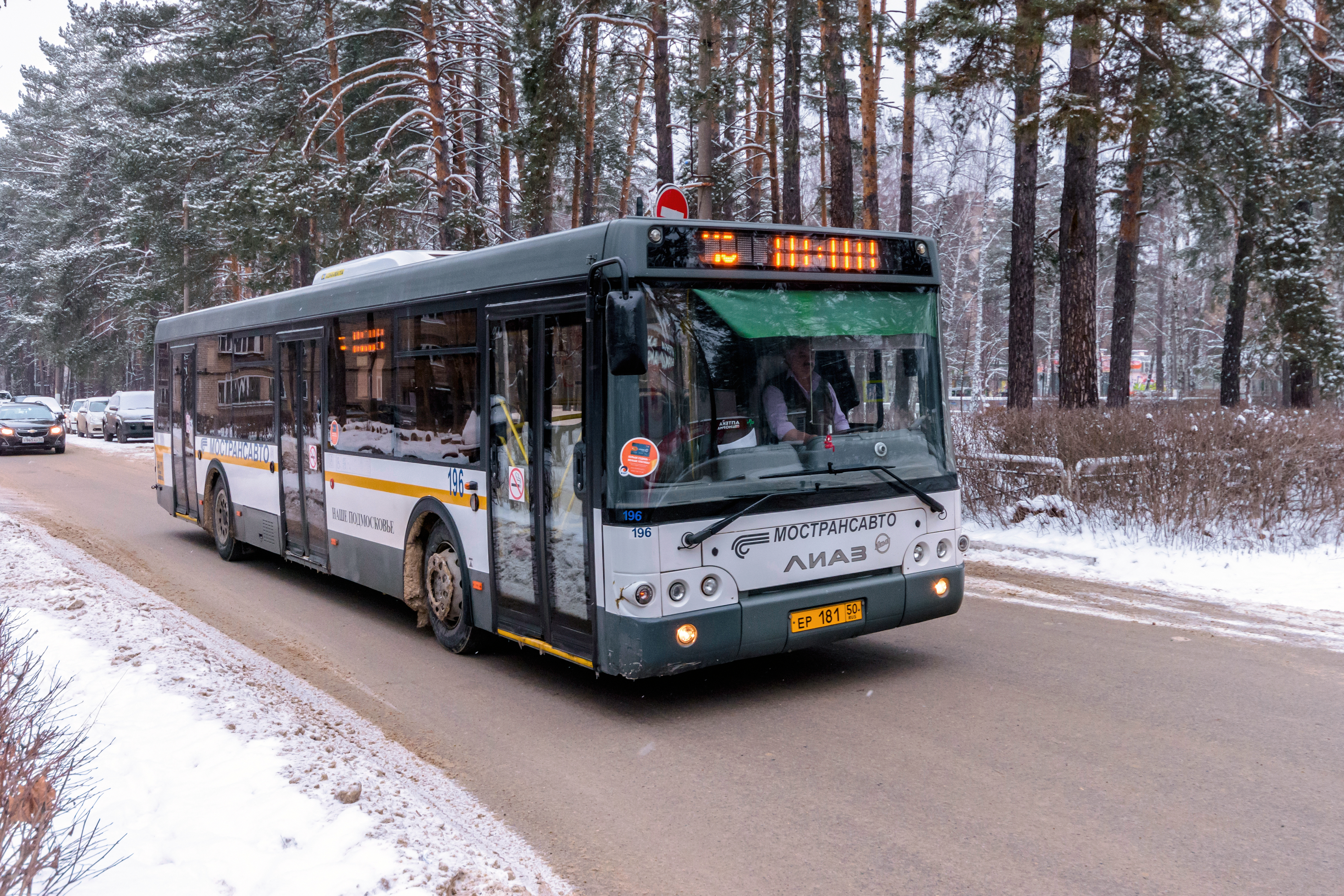
- LiAZ-5292.60 in Protvino, Moscow Oblast, Russia
- Type: Joint-stock company
- Industry: Public transport bus service
- Founded: 1926 in Bogorodsk (modern Noginsk), USSR
- Headquarters: Moscow, Russia
- Area served: Moscow Oblast
- Key people: Sergey Smirnov (General Director)
- Owner: Moscow Oblast (100%)
- Website: https://mostransavto.ru/

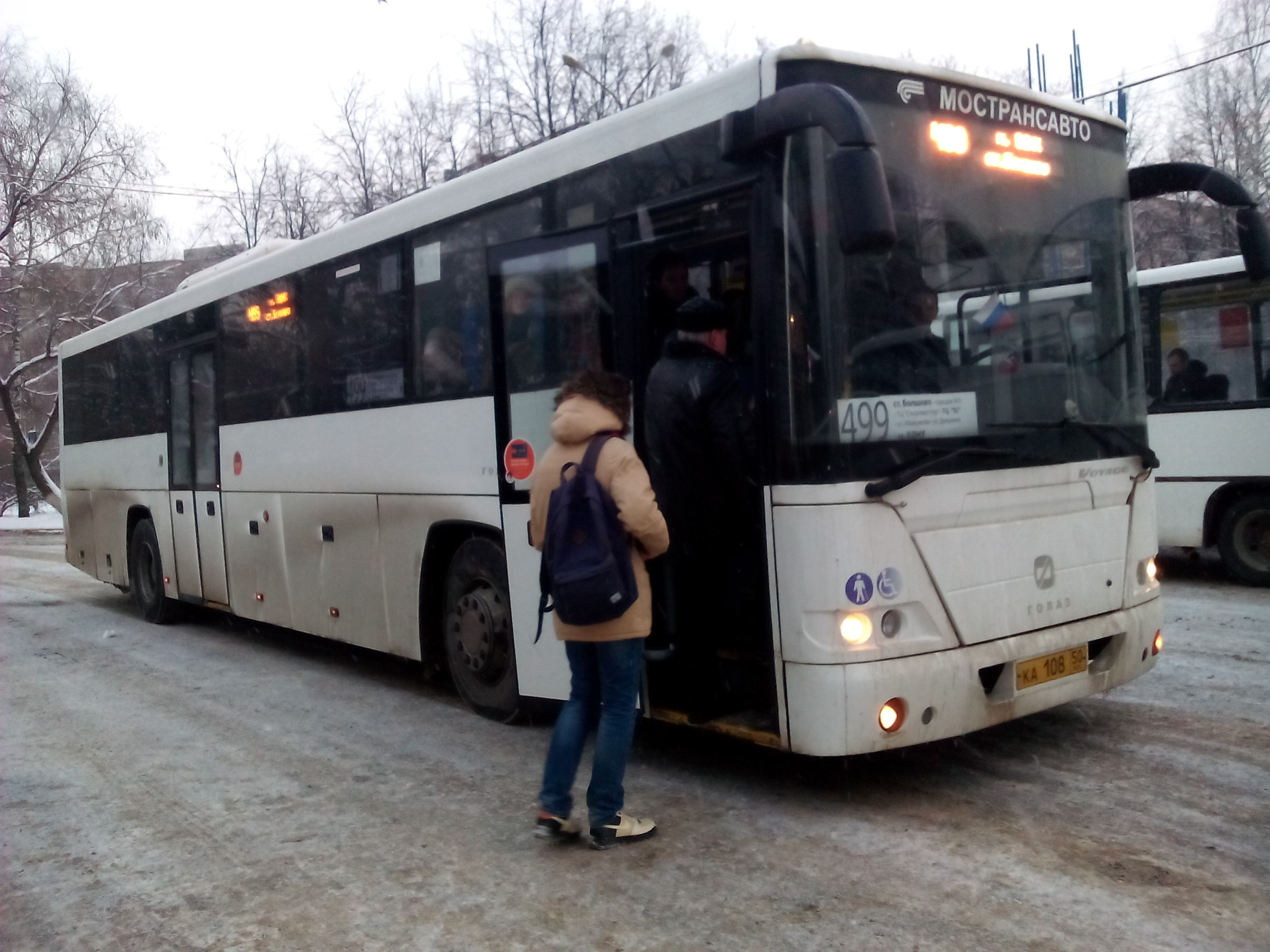
Mostransavto coach in Korolyov

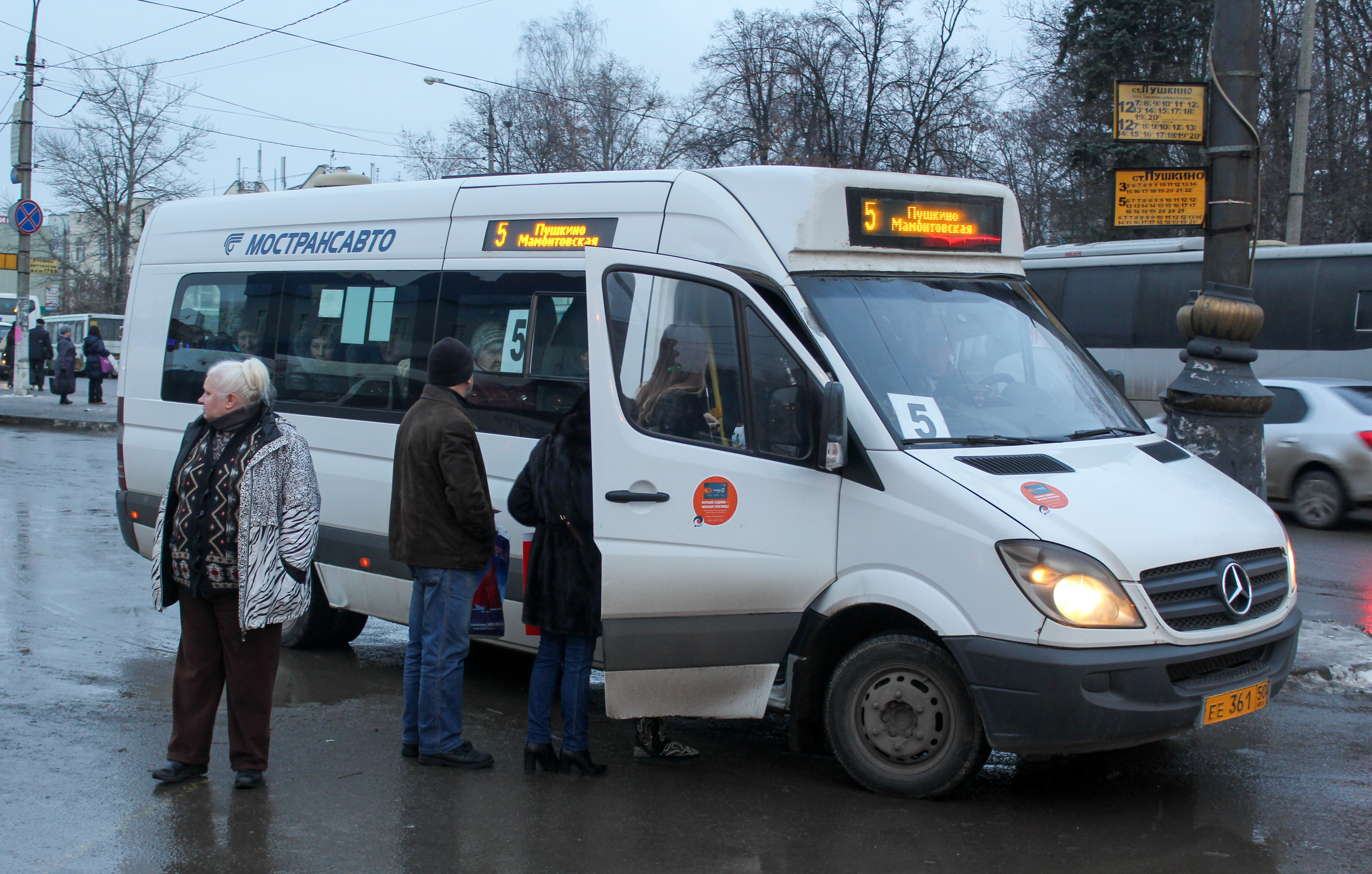
Mostransavto minibus in Pushkino

Mostransavto (Russian: Мострансавто) is a formerly state-owned, joint-stock company operating bus transit within the Moscow Oblast. It has a daily throughput of 2.3 million passengers. Currently, it oversees up to 4000 buses, 1209 different routes, and 44 bus terminals and terminal stations.

In 2019, Mostransavto was reorganized from a state-owned enterprise into a joint-stock company, completely owned by the Government of Moscow Oblast.

== History ==
On August 11, 1924, a plenary meeting of the Moscow City Council Presidium was held, at which it was decided to begin organizing suburban bus services in stages, followed by transport services for industrial cities in the Moscow province. The first buses in the Moscow region appeared on the streets of Serpukhov, Kolomna, Orekhovo-Zuyev, Podolsk, Noginsk, and some other cities from 1925 to 1926.

The petal board was a checkpoint for bus drivers at the terminal. It was used in the 1990s.

In 1992, Mostransauto transferred from state ownership to regional ownership; financial support was reduced. Previously, 12% of the rolling stock was renewed during the year, and about the same percentage underwent major repairs; but after Perestroika, the number of new buses decreased sharply, and buses were no longer repaired at specialized factories, but in workshops at enterprises. The financial situation of Mostransavto also changed, as in addition to the state-owned carrier, a large number of private carriers appeared.

To overcome the crisis, Mostransavto enterprises entered the commercial transportation market (almost 1,000 Gazelle minibuses were leased for this purpose), and long-distance routes appeared, mostly parallel to the main railway routes.

Starting in 1993, used foreign-made buses—mainly Ikarus, Mercedes-Benz, and MAN brands—were purchased. In the early 2000s, a large batch of Israeli Haargaz buses on a Mercedes-Benz O303 chassis arrived to serve intercity routes.

The year 2001 was a turning point for Mostransavto. Mostransavto enterprises received large shipments of new buses. Among other things, the construction and reconstruction of bus terminals and bus stations began. In the following years, convenient train stations were built in Sergiev Posad, Chekhov, Klin, Lukhovitsy, Silver Ponds, Domodedovo, Yegoryevsk, Voskresensk, Kolomna, and other cities of the Moscow region. Other programs (including production automation) began to be developed, ultimately aimed at improving the quality of passenger transportation.

In 2005, the first batch of new Scania OmniLink buses arrived, which made it possible to replace the old buses on suburban and intercity routes.

In 2007, Mostransavto received a large batch of new Mercedes-Benz Conecto commuter buses from Turkey on leasing terms, which made it possible to replace out-of-service vehicles on suburban and intercity routes.

Starting in the mid-2010s, a large batch of LiAZ-5292 buses with several modifications. In 2015, Mostransavto received a large batch of new LiAZ-4292.60 buses, which operate on intra-city, intra-district routes in the Moscow region, as well as suburban routes of Moscow and its region, which were owned by SUE Mosgortrans. This batch of buses completely replaced the old LiAZ-5256 buses that had reached the end of their service life, as well as other old buses with various modifications that operated on intra-city and intra-district routes in the Moscow region.

In 2019, the State Unitary Enterprise "Mostransavto" was reorganized into a joint-stock company (JSC).

Starting in 2020, Mostransavto began to receive a suburban version of the LiAZ-5292.65 bus, which could completely replace buses that had reached the end of their service life, such as the Scania OmniLink and other brands that arrived in the mid-2000s.

From July 2021 to October 2022, Mostransavto JSC was headed by Sergey Alekseevich Smirnov as General Director.

On May 16, 2022, the passenger transportation service was launched at the request of NamPoPuti.

Effective June 18, 2022, cash payments were canceled on the buses of Mostransavto JSC and other regional carriers.

As of the end of June 2022, Mostransavto JSC was on the verge of bankruptcy. The government of the Moscow region, in order to avoid bankruptcy proceedings, launched the company's rehabilitation procedure. Within the framework of Resolution No. 659/18 of June 23, 2022, "On Taking measures to prevent Bankruptcy and Restore Solvency (Rehabilitation) of MOSTRANSAVTO Joint Stock Company", the procedure was as follows:

Financial resources will be allocated from the budget (up to 3,800,000,000 ₽); it is necessary to reduce accounts payable; suspensions of activities as of January 1, 2023, are unacceptable; The company is facing serious cuts—it is planned to reduce up to 20% of employees.

In August 2022, the government of the Moscow region provided a batch of 110 new blue LiAZ-4292.60 buses to the company.

On September 30, Smirnov resigned as CEO of Mostransavto JSC. On October 3, 2022, Sergey Vladimirovich Kaigorodov was appointed the new director.

In the winter of 2022–2023, two bus deliveries took place: one in December 2022, with 20 new ЛиАЗ-5292.65 buses; and one in January 2023, with 49 new LiAZ-4292.60 buses in the Moscow region. From February to July of that year, 80 NEFAZ-5299-40-52 buses (urban modification) and 326 NEFAZ-5299-31-52 buses (suburban modification) were delivered. The delivery of other buses also began.

On August 10, 2023, an auction notice was posted on the public procurement portal: "Provision of services for assessing the market value of 100% of the share in the authorized capital of RAND-TRANS LLC, as well as conducting an expert examination of a self-regulatory organization of appraisers for an assessment report". The customer was JSC Mostransavto. Later, the purchase was canceled; on August 15, an auction was held for "Provision of services for assessing the market value of 100% of the share in the authorized capital of Stafftrans LLC, as well as for conducting an expert examination of a self‐regulatory organization of appraisers for an evaluation report". (The customer is also Mostransavto JSC.) It is assumed that Mostransavto planned to buy out these legal entities, along with their buses and drivers.

== Bus terminals and bus stations in Moscow Oblast ==
A total of 44 bus terminals and bus stations in Moscow Oblast are owned and operated by Mostransavto.

=== Bus terminals ===
- Chekhov Bus Terminal
- Dmitrov Bus Terminal
- Domodedovo Bus Terminal
- Klin Bus Terminal
- Kolomna Bus Terminal
- Lukhovitsy Bus Terminal
- Mozhaysk Bus Terminal
- Mytishchi Bus Terminal
- Noginsk Bus Terminal
- Orekhovo-Zuyevo Bus Terminal
- Ramenskoye Bus Terminal
- Sergiyev Posad Bus Terminal
- Stupino Bus Terminal
- Volokolamsk Bus Terminal
- Voskresensk Bus Terminal
- Yegoryevsk Bus Terminal
- Zaraysk Bus Terminal

=== Bus stations ===
- ″Yuzhnaya″ Bus Station, Balashikha
- ″Zvyozdnaya″ Bus Station, Balashikha
- Bronnitsy Bus Station
- Chernogolovka Bus Station
- Elektrogorsk Bus Station
- Fryazino Bus Station
- ″Staraya Kolomna″ Bus Station, Kolomna
- Krasnoarmeysk Bus Station
- Kurovskoe Bus Station
- Lotoshino Bus Station
- Lytkarino Bus Station
- Ozyory Bus Station
- Pavlovsky Posad Bus Station
- ″Podolsk station″ Bus Station, Podolsk
- Protvino Bus Station
- Pushchino Bus Station
- Pushkino Bus Station
- Roshal Bus Station
- Ruza Bus Station
- Serebryanye Prudy Bus Station
- Serpukhov Bus Station
- Shakhovskaya Bus Station
- Shatura Bus Station
- Solnechnogorsk Bus Station
- Taldom Bus Station
- Vereya Bus Station

Mostransavto also operates a passenger service complex at Kashira station (in the town of Kashira).

== Rolling stock ==
As of 2025, Mostransavto JSC had more than 5 thousand buses. Mostransavto JSC also provides buses on order, mainly, ГАЗ A64R42, ГолАЗ-5251, ЛиАЗ-5250 (ЛиАЗ-5251), ЛиАЗ-4292.60, ЛиАЗ-5292.60, ПАЗ-320445-04, Луидор-2250DS, ГАЗель City, НефАЗ-5299, ЛиАЗ Cruise, Foton BJ6122U8MKB-A2, and other models.

Gallery of rolling stock

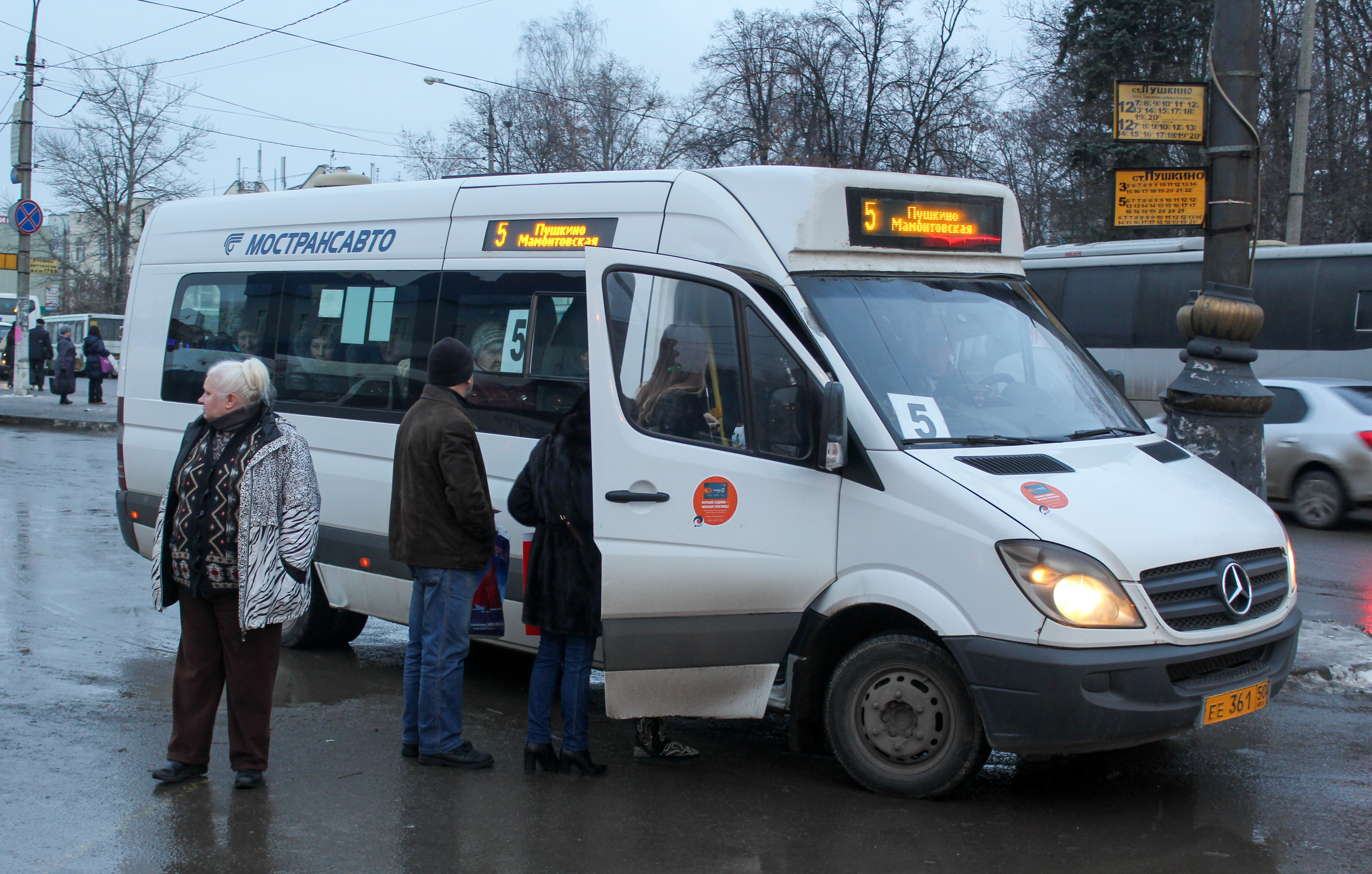
Louis-22340C minibus (MB Sprinter 515CDI) in Pushkin, route No. 5

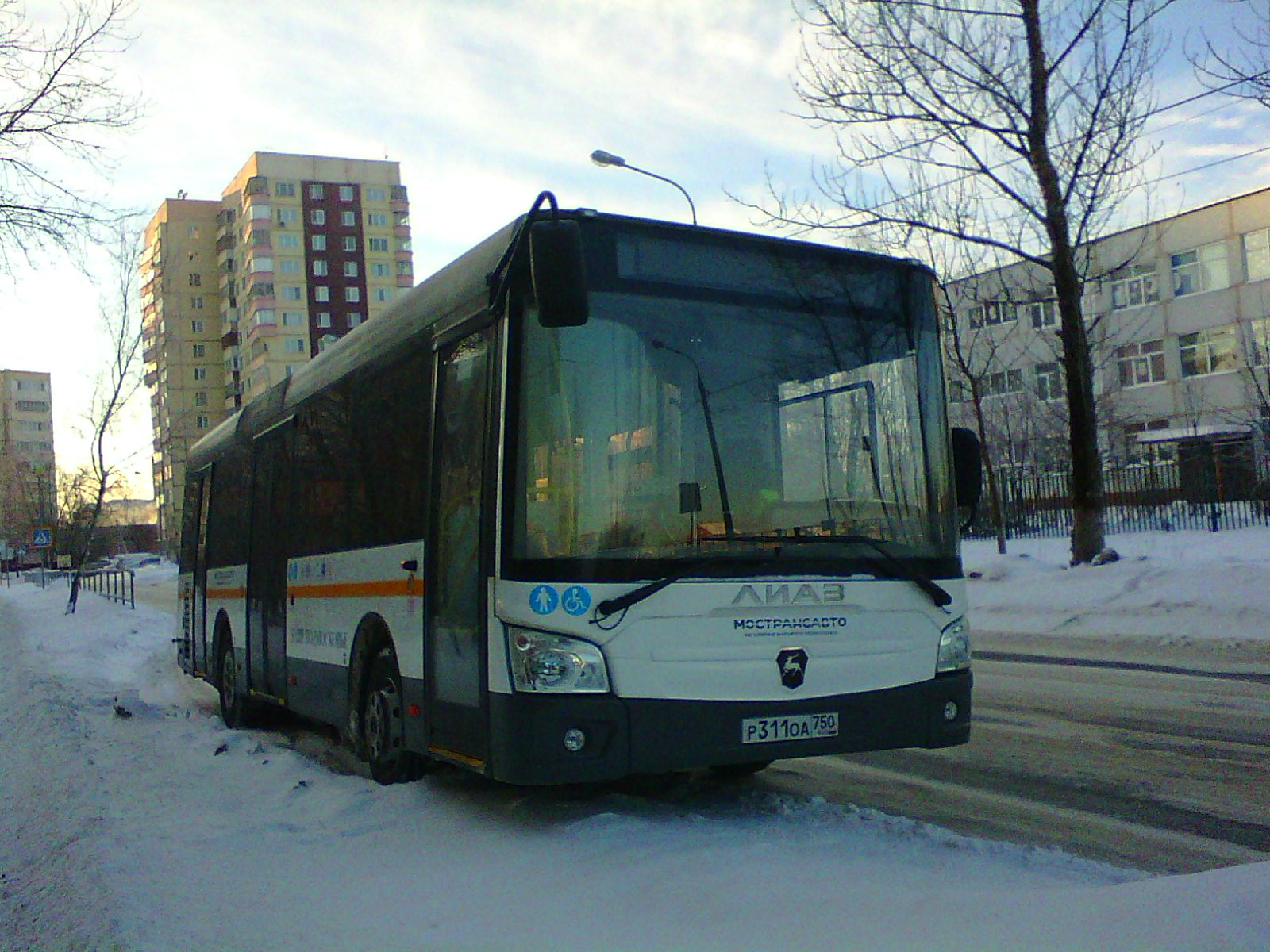
LIAZ 4292 Mostransavto, Naro-Fominsk

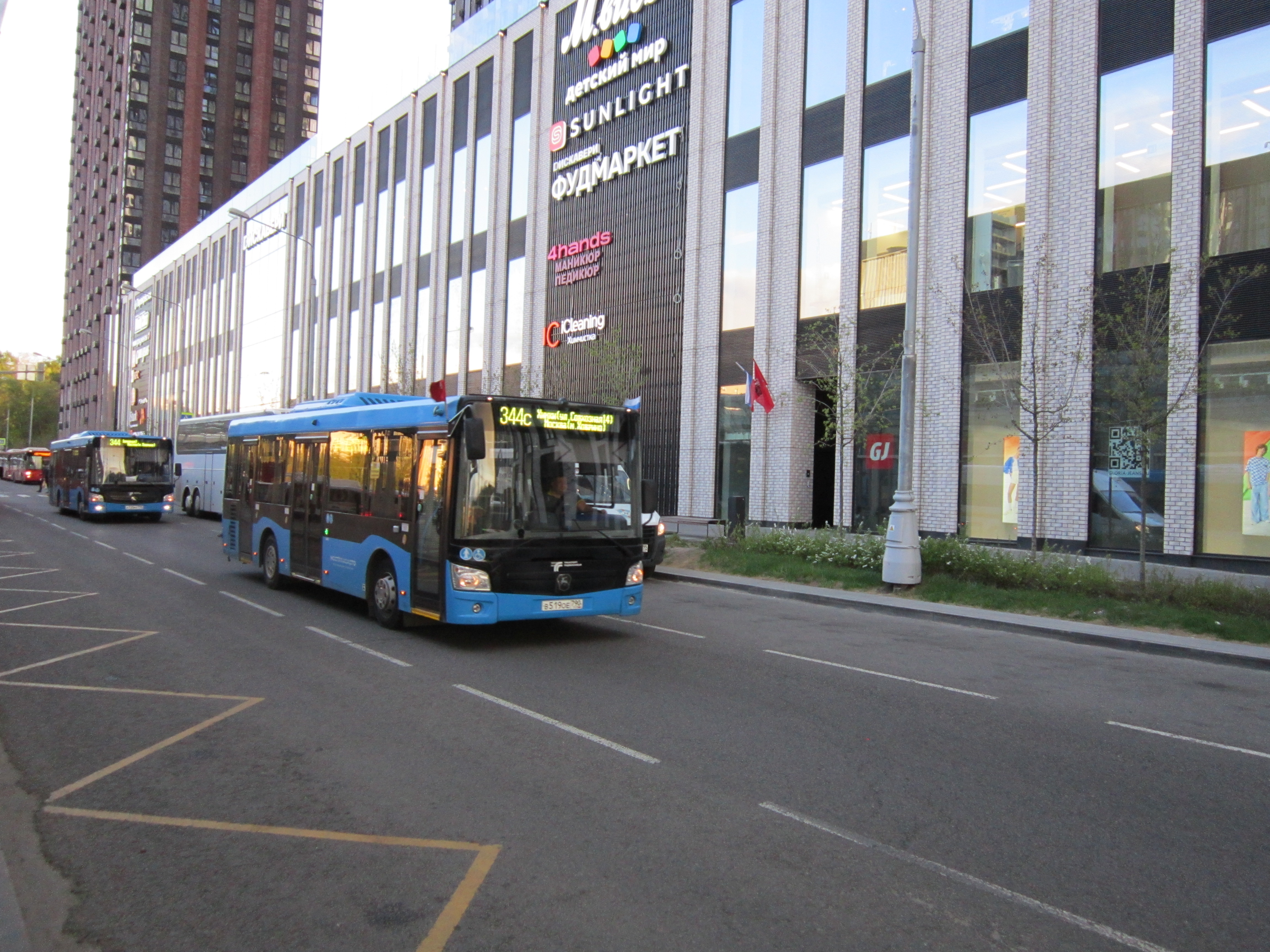
Two LiAZ-4292.60 buses of JSC Mostransavto, routes No. 344c and 344, at a suburban bus station near the Khovrino metro station, May 2023

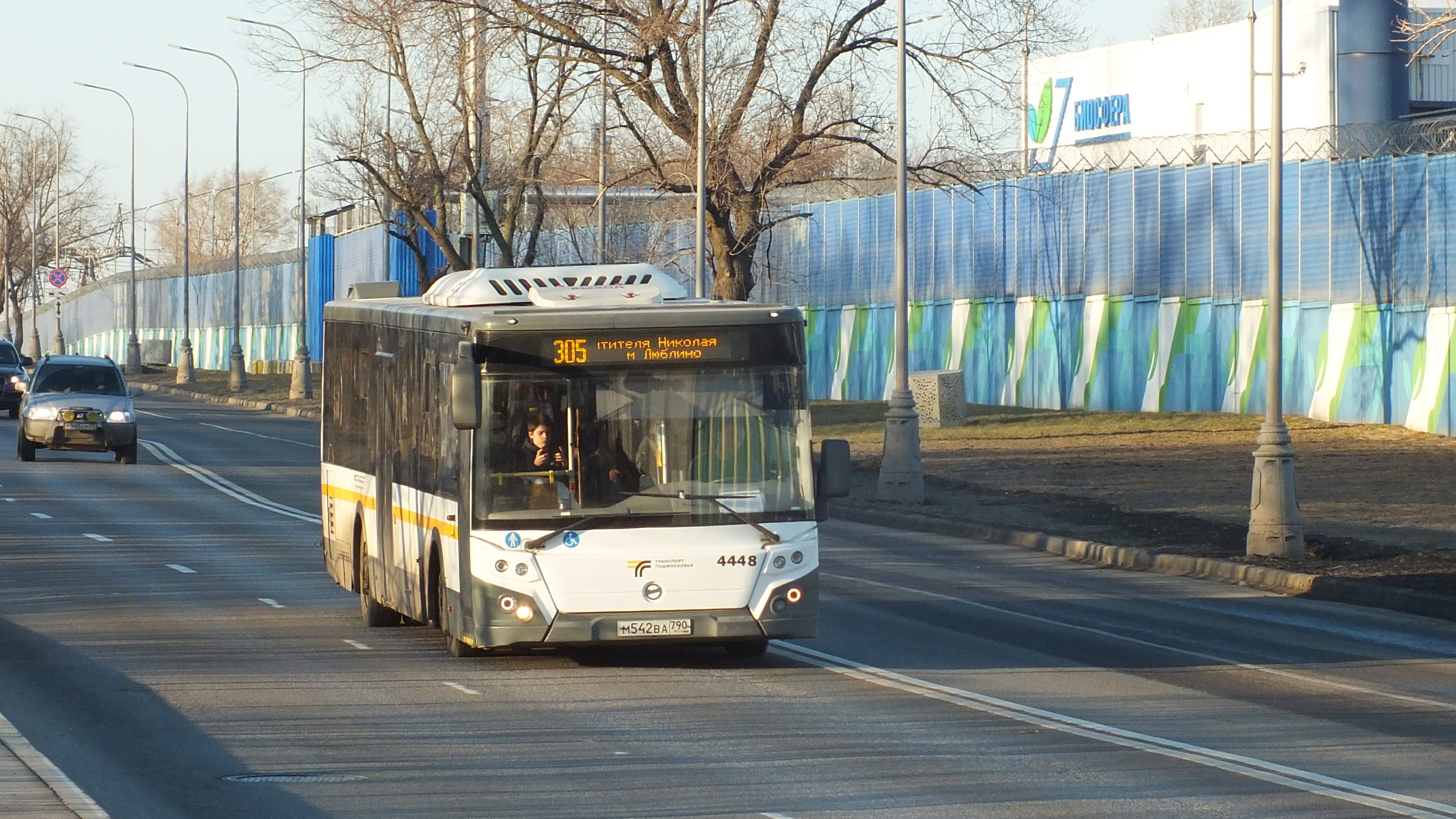
Bus of the Moscow region route No. 305 in the Kapotnya area, transport of the city of Dzerzhinsky, on Kapotnya Street

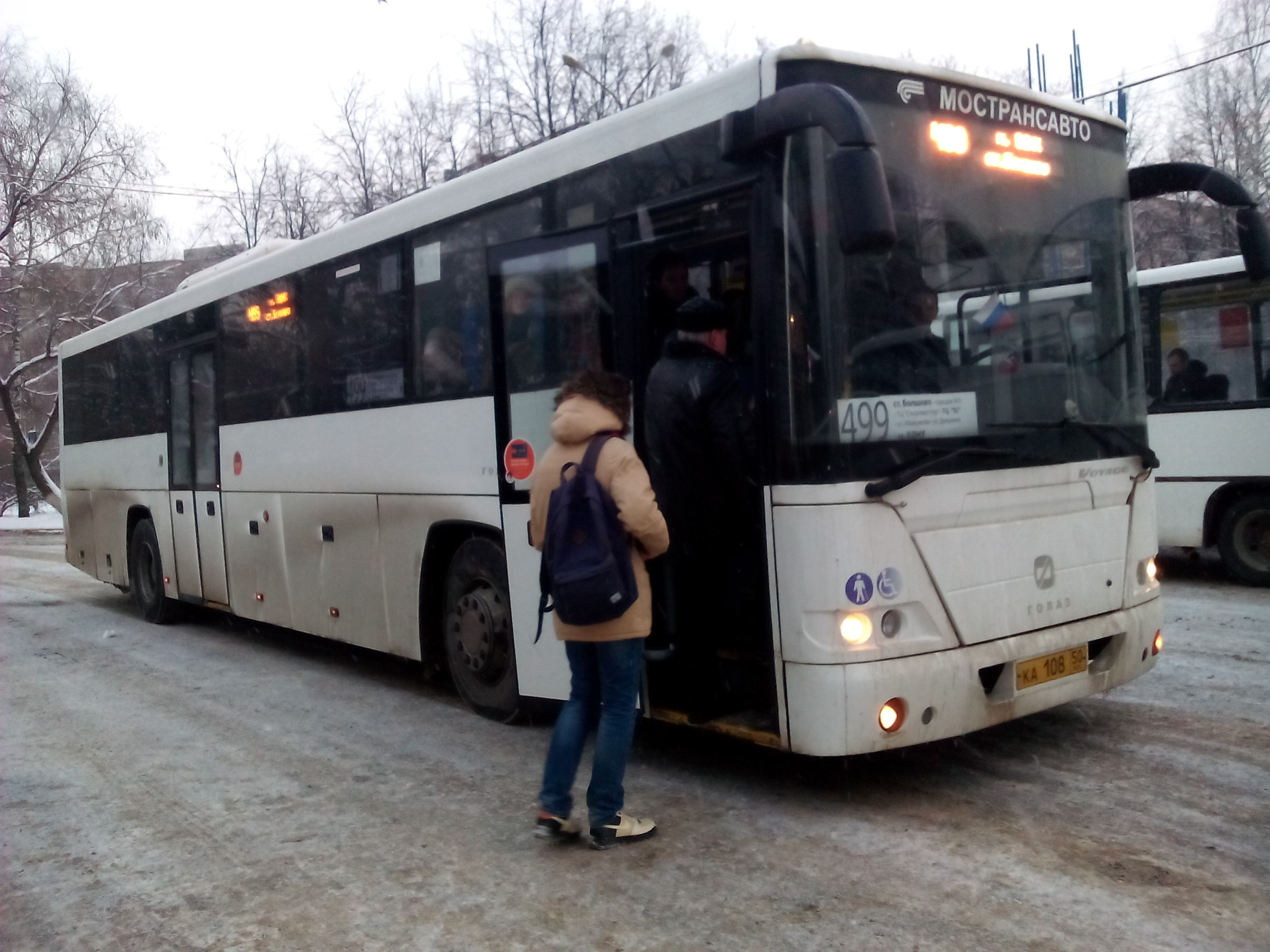
GolAZ-525110-11 "Voyage" intercity bus in Korolev, route No. 499

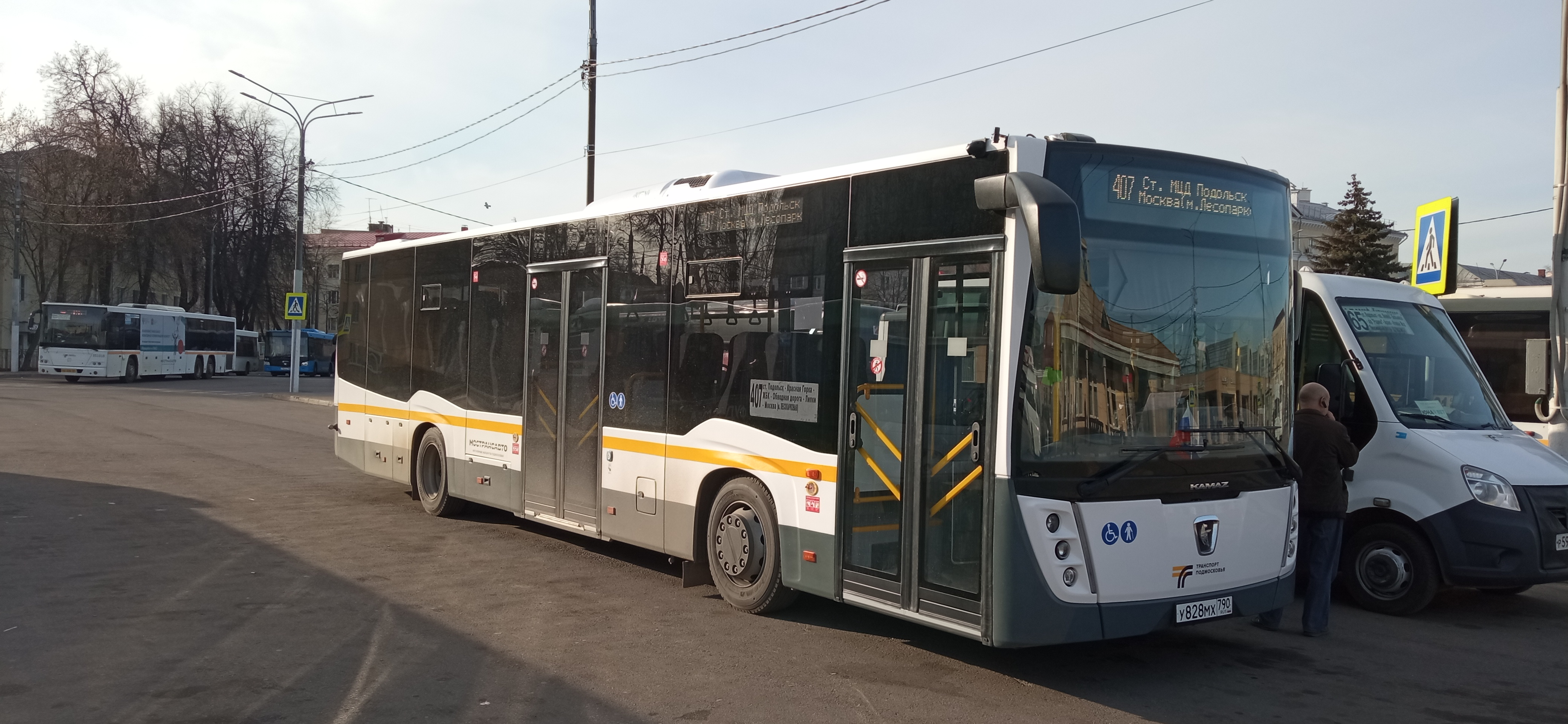
NefAZ commuter bus-5299-31-52 in a parking lot near Podolsk, April 2023

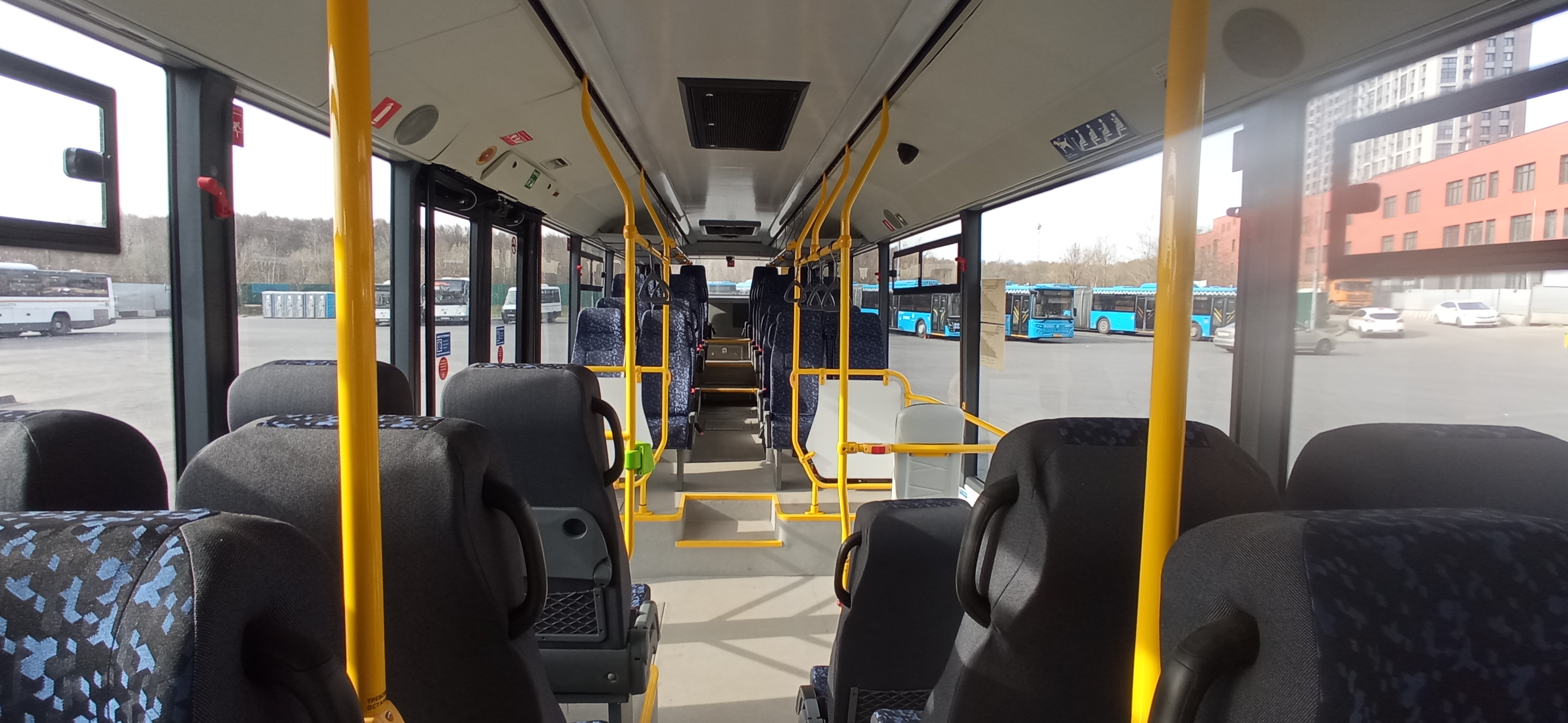
NefAZ commuter bus Showroom-5299-31-52, forward view

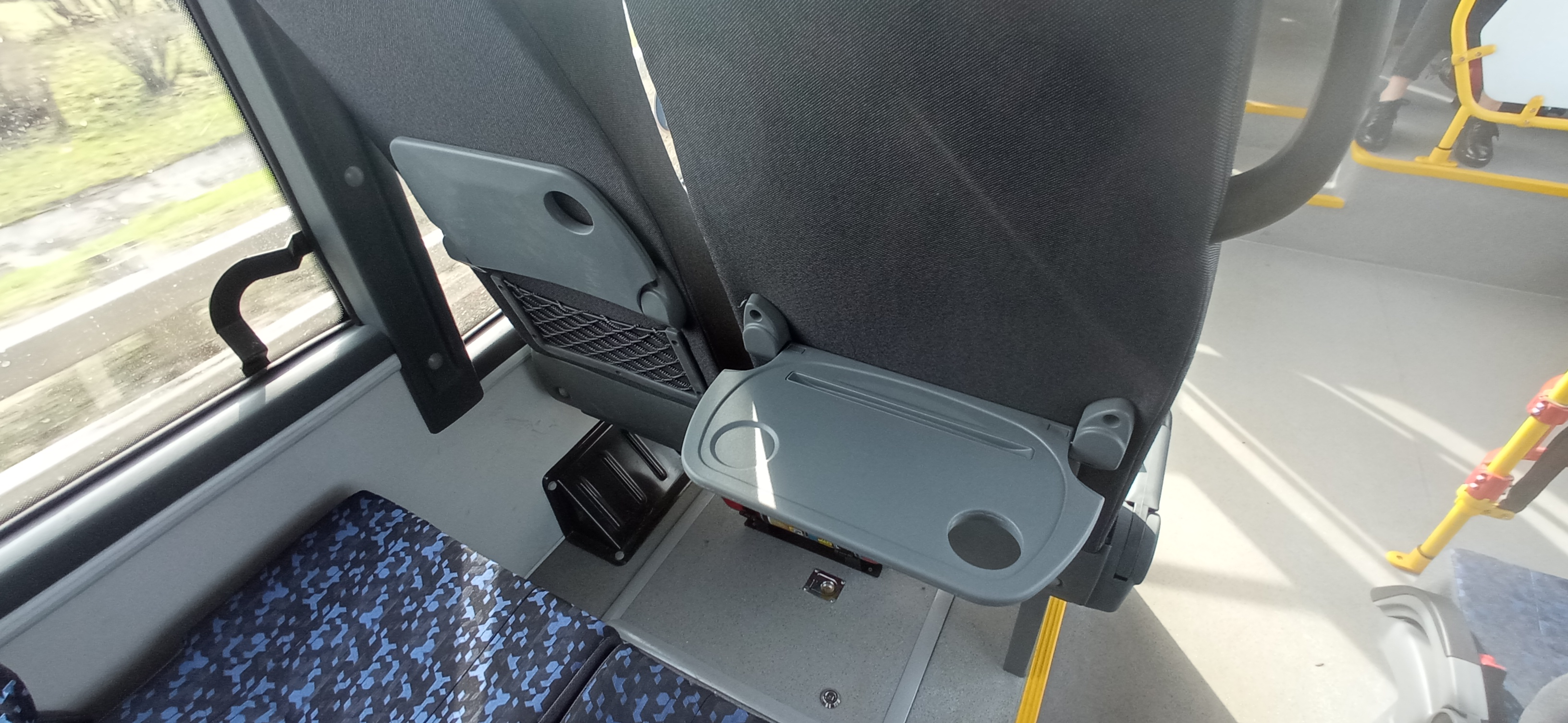
NefAZ Salon-5299-31-52. View of the seats with tables and pockets

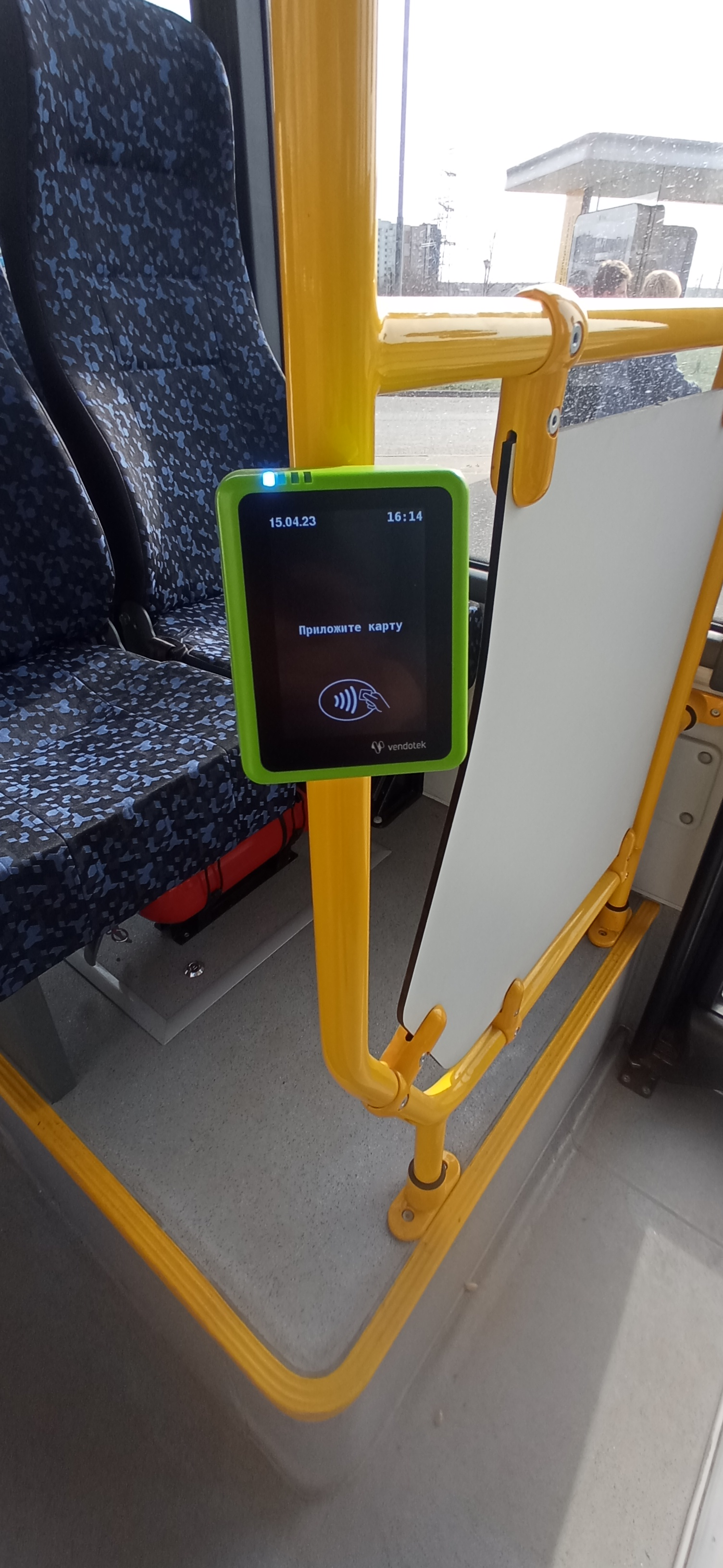
Validator on the NefAZ commuter bus-5299-31-52

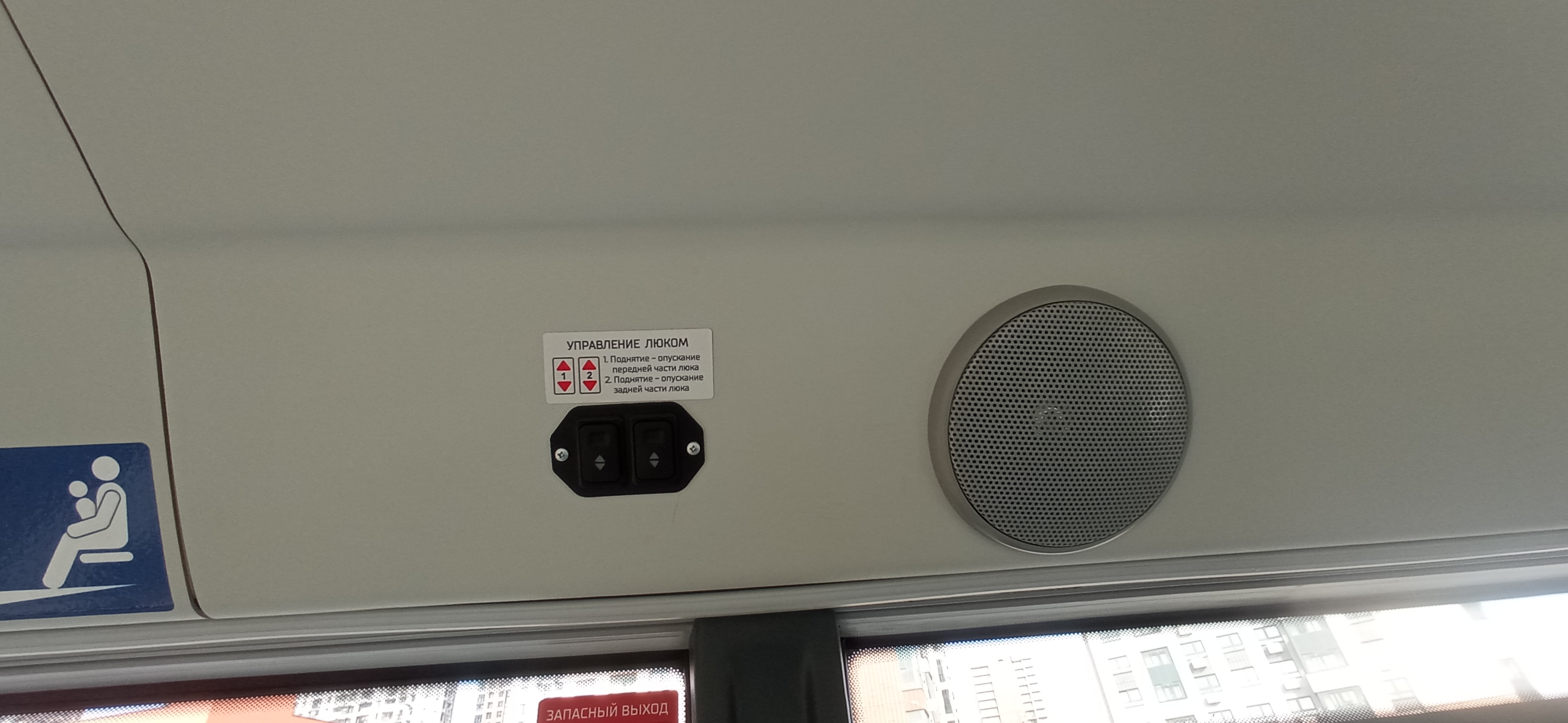
NefAZ Salon-5299-31-52 JSC "Mostransavto". View of the front hatch control buttons. The rear hatch of the bus opens and closes manually.

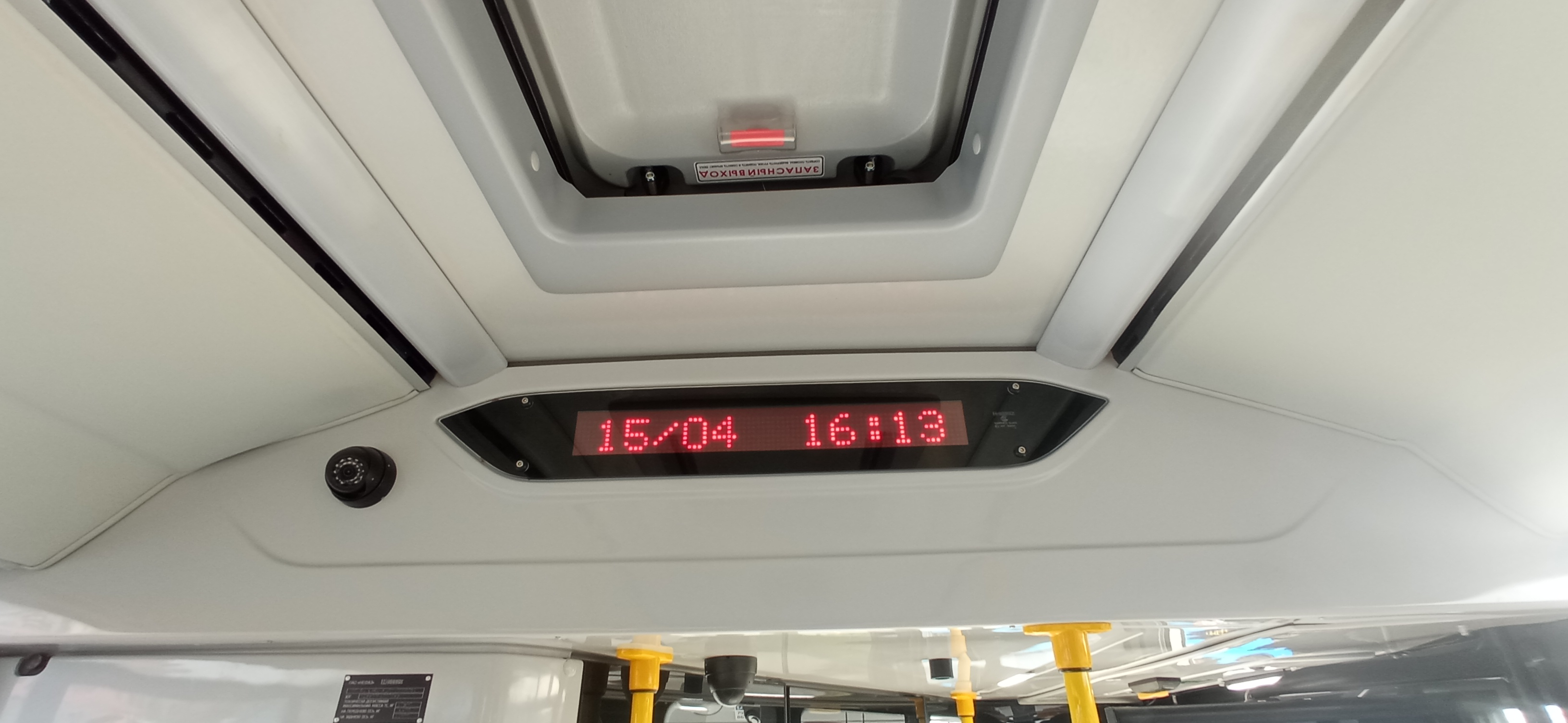
The scoreboard in the passenger compartment of the NefAZ commuter bus-5299-31-52. The nameplate is located below on the left.

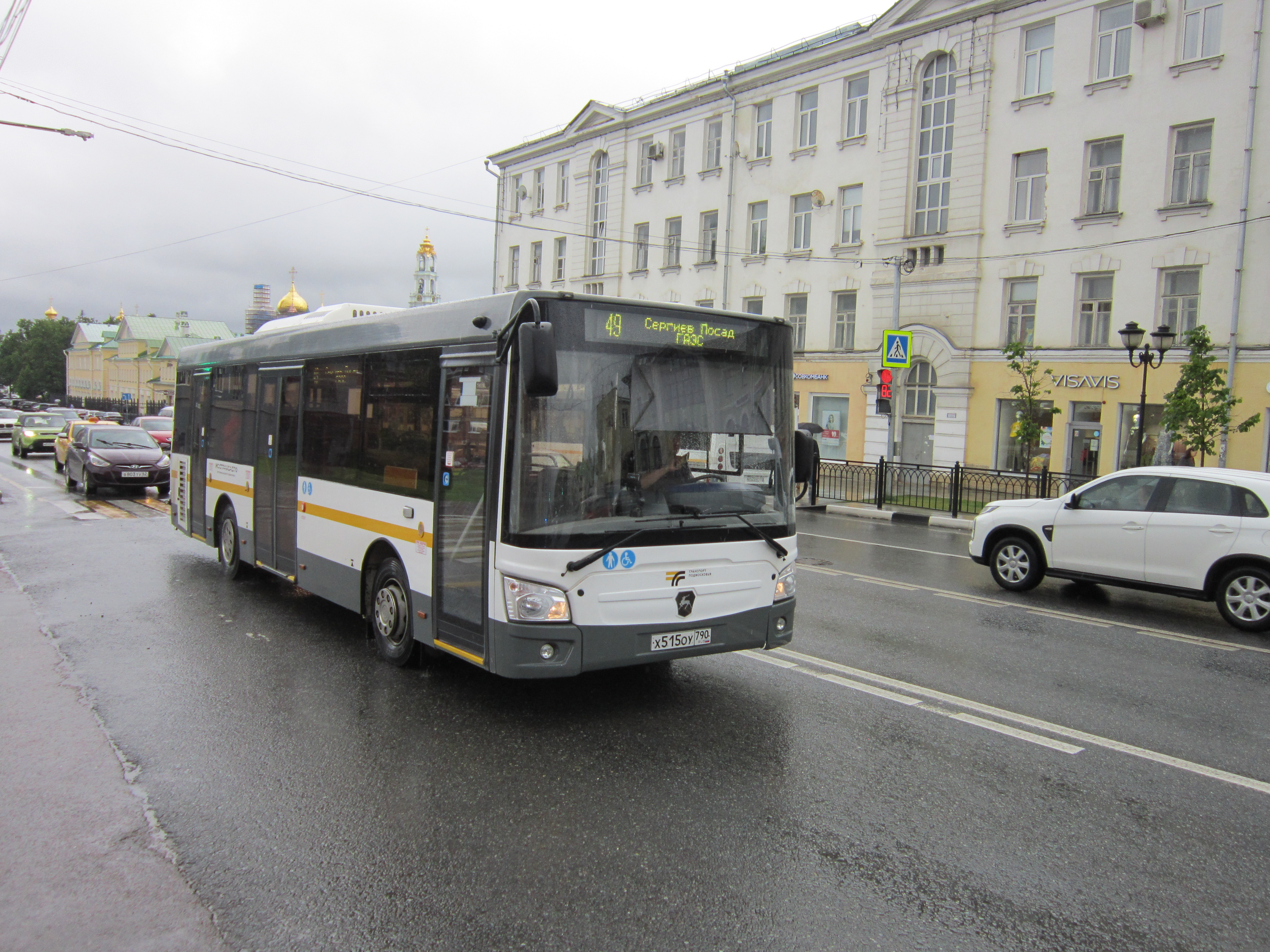
LiAZ-4292.60 (1-2-1) JSC "Mostransavto" for delivery in 2023 on Red Army Avenue in Sergiev Posad

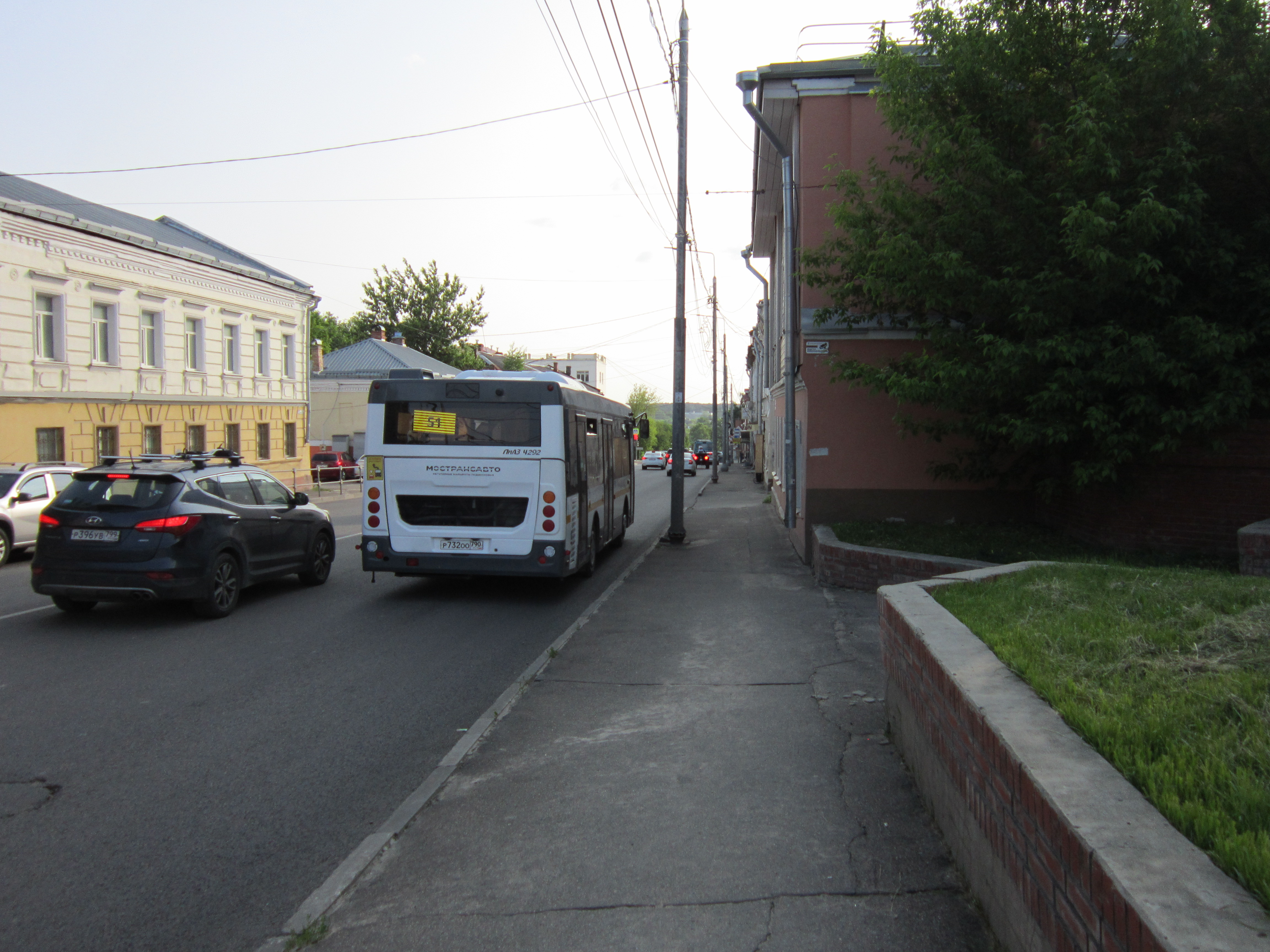
LiAZ-4292.60 JSC "Mostransavto" in Serpukhov. A special feature of individual buses is an EMU, similar to those used on the LiAZ-4292 and LiAZ-5292 buses in St. Petersburg by the State Unitary Enterprise Passazhiravtotrans of St. Petersburg.

== See also ==
- Mosgortrans
