= Vladimir Putin =

Leader of Russia since 1999

- Владимир Путин
- Putin in 2026

President of Russia
- Incumbent
- Assumed office 7 May 2012
- Prime Minister: Viktor Zubkov (acting); Dmitry Medvedev; Mikhail Mishustin (Note: Andrey Belousov served as acting prime minister in 2020 when Mishustin tested positive for COVID-19.)
- Preceded by: Dmitry Medvedev
- In office 31 December 1999 (Note: Acting: 31 December 1999 – 7 May 2000) – 7 May 2008
- Prime Minister: Himself; Mikhail Kasyanov; Mikhail Fradkov; Viktor Zubkov
- Preceded by: Boris Yeltsin
- Succeeded by: Dmitry Medvedev

Prime Minister of Russia
- In office 8 May 2008 – 7 May 2012
- President: Dmitry Medvedev
- First Deputy: Sergei Ivanov; Viktor Zubkov; Igor Shuvalov
- Preceded by: Viktor Zubkov
- Succeeded by: Dmitry Medvedev; Viktor Zubkov (acting)
- In office 9 August 1999 (Note: Acting: 9–16 August 1999) – 7 May 2000
- President: Boris Yeltsin; Himself (acting)
- First Deputy: Nikolay Aksyonenko; Viktor Khristenko; Mikhail Kasyanov
- Preceded by: Sergei Stepashin
- Succeeded by: Mikhail Kasyanov

First Deputy Prime Minister of Russia
- In office 9–16 August 1999
- Prime Minister: Sergei Stepashin; Himself (acting)

Chairman of United Russia
- In office 7 May 2008 – 26 May 2012
- Preceded by: Boris Gryzlov
- Succeeded by: Dmitry Medvedev

De facto leader of United Russia
- Incumbent
- Assumed office 1 December 2001
Other offices held
Secretary of the Security Council of the Russian Federation
In office 9 March 1999 – 9 August 1999
Chairman	Boris Yeltsin
Preceded by	Nikolay Bordyuzha
Succeeded by	Sergei Ivanov
Director of the Federal Security Service
In office 25 July 1998 – 29 March 1999
President	Boris Yeltsin
Preceded by	Nikolay Kovalyov
Succeeded by	Nikolai Patrushev
First Deputy Chief of the Presidential Administration
In office 25 May 1998 – 24 July 1998
President	Boris Yeltsin
Deputy Chief of the Presidential Administration – Head of the Main Supervisory Department
In office 26 March 1997 – 24 May 1998
President	Boris Yeltsin
Preceded by	Alexei Kudrin
Succeeded by	Nikolai Patrushev

Personal details
- Born: 7 October 1952 (age 74) Leningrad, (Note: Now known as Saint Petersburg) Russian SFSR, Soviet Union
- Party: United Russia (de facto, since 2001); Independent (1991–1995, formally since 1999)
- Other political affiliations: People's Front (since 2011); Unity (1999–2001, de facto); Our Home – Russia; (1995–1999); CPSU (1975–1991)
- Spouse: Lyudmila Shkrebneva (m. 1983; div. 2014) (Note: The Putins officially announced their separation in 2013 and the Kremlin confirmed the divorce had been finalized in 2014; however, it has been alleged that Putin and Lyudmila divorced in 2008.)
- Children: At least 2: (Note: Putin has two daughters with his ex-wife Lyudmila. He is also alleged to have a third daughter, with Svetlana Krivonogikh, and a fourth daughter and twin sons, or just two sons, with Alina Kabaeva, although these reports have not been officially confirmed.): Maria; Katerina
- Relatives: Putin family
- Education: Leningrad State University (LLB); Leningrad Mining Institute (Candidate of Sciences)
- Awards: Full list
- Website: en.putin.kremlin.ru

Military service
- Allegiance: Soviet Union (1975–1991); Russia (1991–present)
- Branch/service: KGB; Federal Security Service; Russian Armed Forces
- Years of service: 1975–1991 (KGB); 1997–1999 (Federal Security Service); 2000–present (Russian Armed Forces)
- Rank: Colonel (KGB); 1st class Active State Councillor of the Russian Federation
- Commands: Supreme Commander-in-Chief
- Battles/wars: Second Chechen War; Russo-Georgian War; Insurgency in the North Caucasus; Russo-Ukrainian War; Syrian civil war; Central African Republic Civil War; Mali War
- Vladimir Putin's voice Putin declaring a "special military operation" in Ukraine; Recorded 24 February 2022
- Martial arts career
- Rank: 8th Dan–Judo; 8th Dan–Karate
- Years active: 1963–present

Vladimir Vladimirovich Putin (Note: /ˈpuːtɪn/ POO-tin; Russian: Владимир Владимирович Путин, pronounced [vlɐˈdʲimʲɪr vlɐˈdʲimʲɪrəvʲɪtɕ ˈputʲɪn] (Note: In this name that follows East Slavic naming customs, the patronymic is Vladimirovich and the family name is Putin.)) (born 7 October 1952) is a Russian politician and former intelligence officer who has served as President of Russia since 2012, having previously served from 1999 to 2008. Putin also served as Prime Minister of Russia from 1999 to 2000 (Note: Putin, who took office as prime minister on 9 August 1999, concurrently served as acting president of Russia from 31 December 1999 to 7 May 2000, when he took office as president.) and again from 2008 to 2012. (Note: Many argued that Putin was the de facto leader of Russia between 2008 and 2012; see Medvedev–Putin tandemocracy.) He has been described as the de facto leader of Russia since 1999.

Born in Leningrad (now Saint Petersburg), Putin worked as a KGB foreign intelligence officer for 16 years, rising to the rank of lieutenant colonel. He resigned in 1991 to begin a political career in Saint Petersburg. In 1996, Putin moved to Moscow to join the administration of President Boris Yeltsin. He briefly served as the director of the Federal Security Service (FSB) and then as secretary of the Security Council of Russia before being appointed prime minister in August 1999. Following Yeltsin's resignation, Putin became acting president and, less than three months later in March 2000, was elected to his first term as president. Formally an independent politician, he created the party United Russia and has led it de facto since then. He was reelected in 2004. Due to constitutional limitations on two consecutive presidential terms, Putin served as Prime Minister again from 2008 to 2012 under Dmitry Medvedev. He returned to the presidency in 2012, following an election marked by allegations of fraud and protests, and was reelected in 2018.

During Putin's initial presidential tenure, the Russian economy grew on average by seven percent per year as a result of several economic reforms and a fivefold increase in the price of oil and gas. Additionally, Putin led Russia in a conflict against Chechen separatists, re-establishing federal control over the region. While serving as prime minister under Medvedev, he oversaw the Russo-Georgian War, alongside enacting military and police reforms. In his third presidential term, Russia occupied and annexed Crimea as well as supported a war in eastern Ukraine through several military incursions, resulting in international sanctions, which, together with a drop in oil prices on the international markets, led to the financial crisis in Russia. Additionally, he ordered a military intervention in Syria to support his ally, President Bashar al-Assad, during the Syrian civil war. In April 2021, after a referendum, he signed constitutional amendments into law that included one allowing him to run for reelection twice more, potentially extending his presidency to 2036. In February 2022, during his fourth presidential term, Putin launched a full-scale invasion of Ukraine, which prompted international condemnation and led to expanded sanctions. In September 2022, he announced a partial mobilization and forcibly annexed four Ukrainian oblasts into Russia. In March 2023, the International Criminal Court issued an arrest warrant for Putin for war crimes related to his alleged criminal responsibility for illegal child abductions during the war. In March 2024, he was reelected to another term in an election beset by record levels of fraud.

Under Putin's rule, the Russian political system has been transformed into an authoritarian dictatorship with a personality cult. His rule has been marked by endemic corruption and widespread human rights violations, including the imprisonment and suppression of political opponents, intimidation and censorship of independent media in Russia, and a lack of free and fair elections. Russia has consistently received very low scores on Transparency International's Corruption Perceptions Index, The Economist Democracy Index, Freedom House's Freedom in the World index, and the Reporters Without Borders' World Press Freedom Index.

== Early life and education ==
Putin was born on 7 October 1952 in Leningrad (now known as Saint Petersburg), Russian SFSR, Soviet Union. He is the youngest of three children born to Vladimir Spiridonovich Putin and Maria Ivanovna Putina (née Shelomova). Both of Putin's parents were born in 1911 in neighbouring villages in the Tver region; they married in 1928 and moved to Leningrad in 1932. His grandfather, Spiridon Putin, was a personal cook to Vladimir Lenin and Joseph Stalin. Putin's birth was preceded by the deaths of two brothers: Albert, born in the 1930s, died in infancy, and Viktor, born in 1940, died of diphtheria and starvation in 1942 during the Siege of Leningrad by German forces in World War II. The family lived in a communal apartment at 12 Baskov Lane, where several families shared basic facilities; Putin's parents had moved there in 1944 into housing provided through the factory where his father worked.

Putin's mother was a factory worker, and his father was a conscript in the Soviet Navy, serving in the submarine fleet in the early 1930s. During the early stage of the Nazi invasion of the Soviet Union, his father served in the destruction battalion of the NKVD. Later, he was transferred to the regular army and was severely wounded in 1942. Putin's maternal grandmother was killed by the German occupiers of the Tver region in 1941, and his maternal uncles disappeared on the Eastern Front during World War II.

=== Education ===
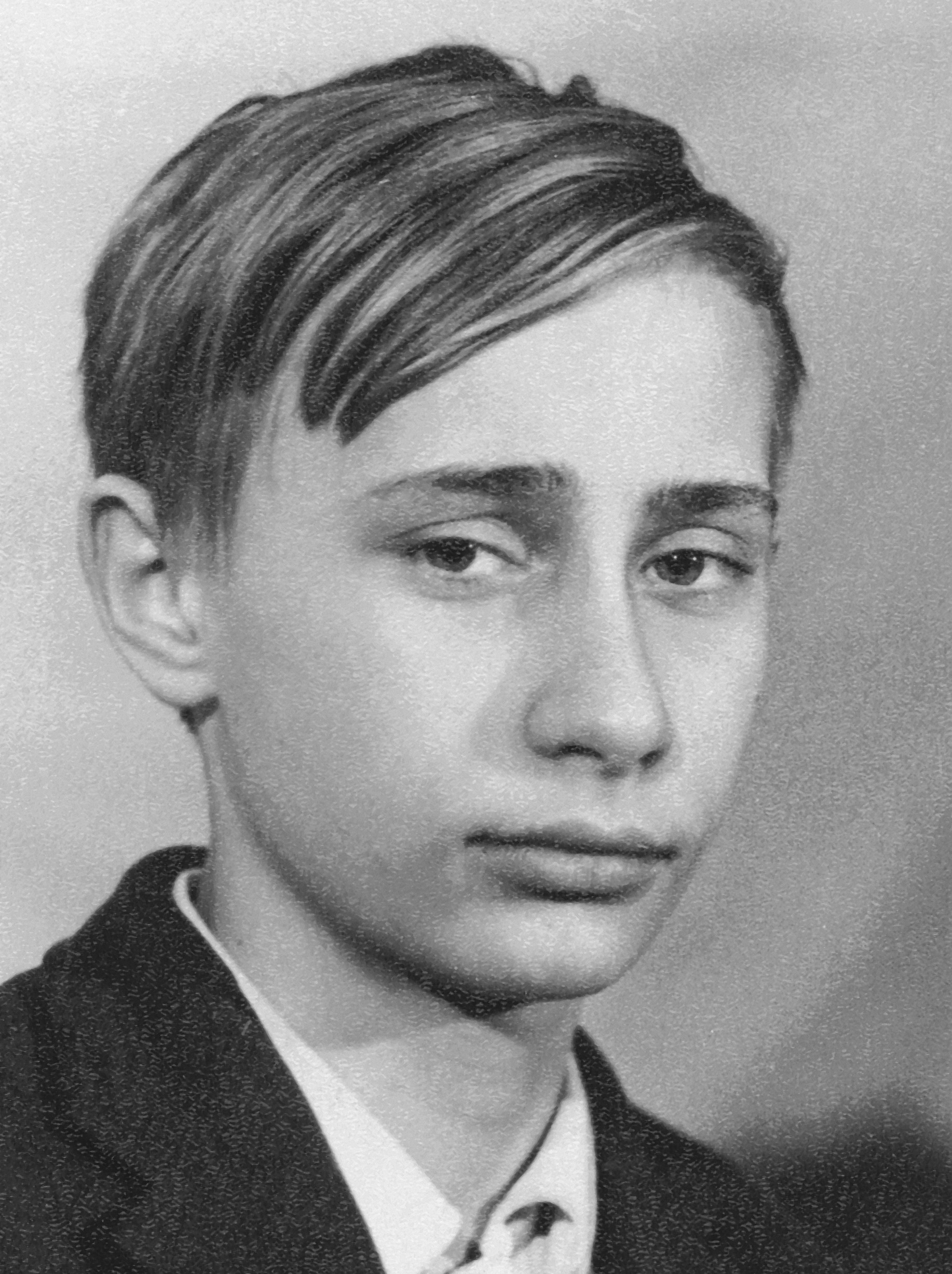
Putin c. 1960s

On 1 September 1960, Putin started at School No. 193 at Baskov Lane, near his home. He was one of a few in his class of about 45 pupils who were not yet members of the Young Pioneer (Komsomol) organization. At the age of 12, he began to practice sambo and judo. In his free time, he enjoyed reading the works of Karl Marx, Friedrich Engels, and Lenin. Putin attended Saint Petersburg High School 281 with a German language immersion program. He is fluent in German and has given speeches and interviews in that language.

Putin studied law at the Leningrad State University named after Andrei Zhdanov (now Saint Petersburg State University) in 1970 and graduated in 1975. His thesis was on "The Most Favored Nation Trading Principle in International Law." While there, he was required to join the Communist Party of the Soviet Union (CPSU); he remained a member until it ceased to exist in 1991. Putin also met Anatoly Sobchak, an assistant professor who taught business law, (Note: Russian: хозяйственное право, romanized: khozyaystvennoye pravo) who later became the co-author of the Russian constitution. Putin was influential in Sobchak's career in Saint Petersburg, and Sobchak was influential in Putin's career in Moscow.

In 1997, Putin received a degree in economics (Candidate of Economic Sciences) at the Saint Petersburg Mining University for a thesis on energy dependencies and their instrumentalisation in foreign policy. His supervisor was Vladimir Litvinenko, who in 2000 and again in 2004 managed his presidential election campaigns in St Petersburg. Igor Danchenko and Clifford Gaddy consider Putin to be a plagiarist according to Western standards. One book from which he copied entire paragraphs is the Russian-language edition of King and Cleland's Strategic Planning and Policy (1978). Balzer wrote on the Putin thesis and Russian energy policy and concludes along with Olcott that "The primacy of the Russian state in the country's energy sector is non-negotiable", and cites the insistence on majority Russian ownership of any joint-venture, particularly since BASF signed the Gazprom Nord Stream-Yuzhno-Russkoye deal in 2004 with a 49–51 structure, as opposed to the older 50–50 split of BP's TNK-BP project.

== Intelligence career ==
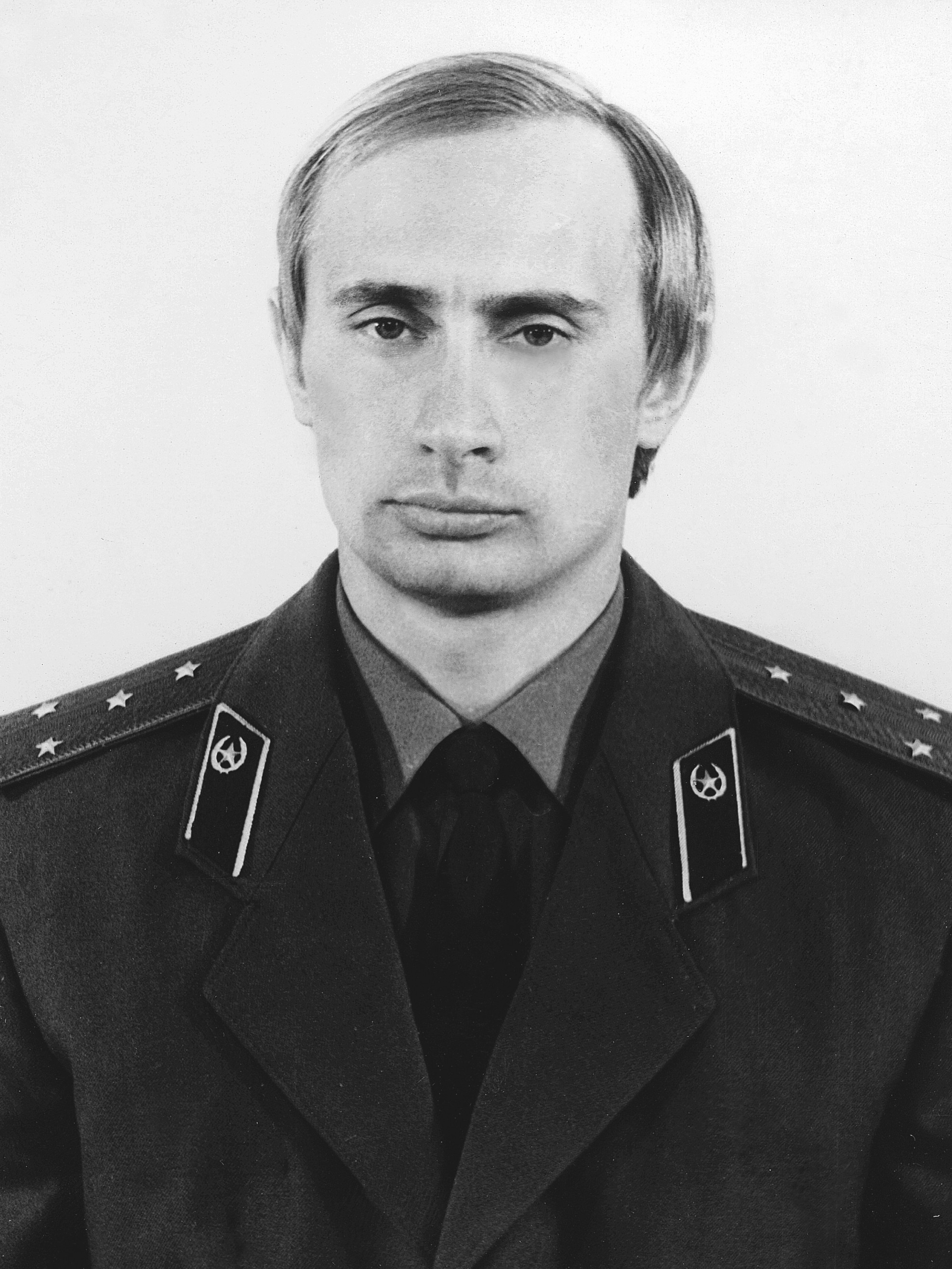
Putin in the KGB c. 1980

In 1975, Putin joined the KGB and trained at the 401st KGB School in Okhta, Leningrad. After training, he worked in the Second Chief Directorate (counterintelligence) before he was transferred to the First Chief Directorate, where he monitored foreigners and consular officials in Leningrad. In September 1984, Putin was sent to Moscow for further training at the Yuri Andropov Red Banner Institute.

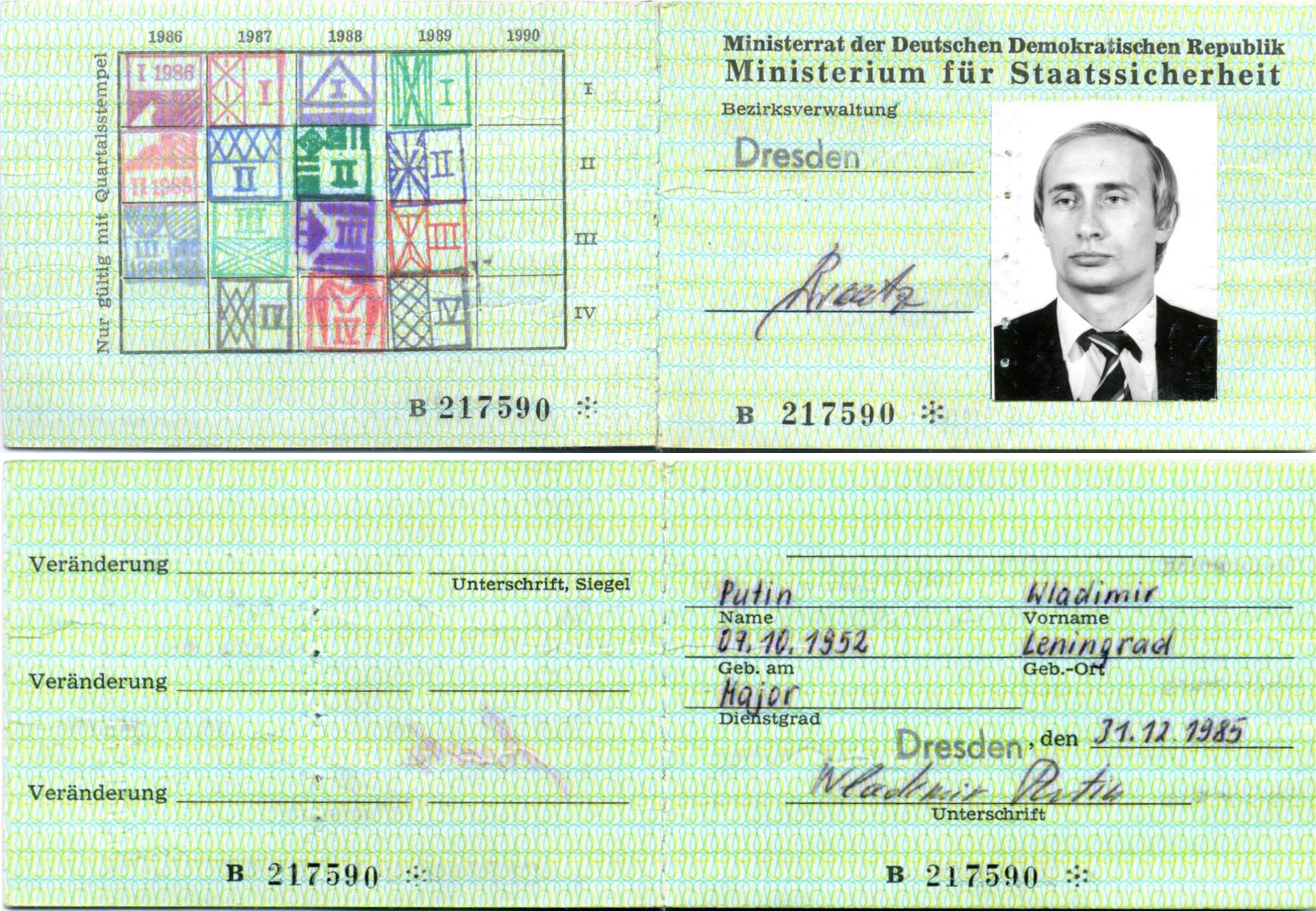
The Stasi identity card of Vladimir Putin, who worked in Dresden as a KGB liaison officer to the Stasi

From 1985 to 1990, he served in Dresden, East Germany, using a cover identity as a translator. While posted in Dresden, Putin served as one of the KGB's liaison officers to the Stasi secret police and was reportedly promoted to lieutenant colonel. According to the official Kremlin presidential site, the East German communist regime commended Putin with a bronze medal for "faithful service to the National People's Army." Putin has publicly conveyed delight over his activities in Dresden, once recounting his confrontations with East Germany's anti-communist protestors of 1989 who attempted to occupy the city's Stasi buildings.

"Putin and his colleagues were reduced mainly to collecting press clippings, thus contributing to the mountains of useless information produced by the KGB", Russian-American Masha Gessen wrote in their 2012 biography of Putin. His work was also downplayed by former Stasi spy chief Markus Wolf and Putin's former KGB colleague Vladimir Usoltsev. Journalist Catherine Belton wrote in 2020 that this downplaying was actually a cover for Putin's involvement in KGB coordination and support for the terrorist Red Army Faction (RAF), whose members frequently hid in East Germany with the support of the Stasi. Dresden was preferred as a "marginal" town with only a small presence of Western intelligence services. According to an anonymous source who claimed to be a former RAF member, at one of these meetings in Dresden, the militants presented Putin with a list of weapons that were later delivered to the RAF in West Germany. Klaus Zuchold, who claimed to be recruited by Putin, said that Putin handled a neo-Nazi, Rainer Sonntag, and attempted to recruit the author of a study on poisons. Putin reportedly met Germans to be recruited for wireless communications affairs, together with an interpreter. He was involved in wireless communications technologies in South-East Asia due to trips of German engineers, recruited by him, there and to the West. However, a 2023 investigation by Der Spiegel reported that the anonymous source had never been an RAF member and is "considered a notorious fabulist" with "several previous convictions, including for making false statements."

According to Putin's official biography, during the fall of the Berlin Wall that began on 9 November 1989, he saved the files of the Soviet Cultural Center (House of Friendship) and of the KGB villa in Dresden for the official authorities of the would-be united Germany to prevent demonstrators, including KGB and Stasi agents, from obtaining and destroying them. He then supposedly burnt only the KGB files, in a few hours, but saved the archives of the Soviet Cultural Center for the German authorities. Nothing is written about the selection criteria during this burning; for example, regarding Stasi files or files of other agencies of the German Democratic Republic or of the USSR. He explained that many documents were left in Germany only because the furnace burst; however, many documents of the KGB villa were sent to Moscow.

After the collapse of the Communist East German government, Putin was to resign from active KGB service because of suspicions aroused regarding his loyalty during demonstrations in Dresden and earlier, although the KGB and the Soviet Army still operated in eastern Germany. He returned to Leningrad in early 1990 as a member of the "active reserves", where he worked for about three months with the International Affairs section of Leningrad State University, reporting to Vice-Rector Yuriy Molchanov, while working on his doctoral dissertation.

There, he looked for new KGB recruits, watched the student body, and renewed his friendship with his former professor, Anatoly Sobchak, who was soon afterward elected the Mayor of Leningrad. Putin said that he resigned with the rank of lieutenant colonel on 20 August 1991, on the second day of the 1991 Soviet coup d'état attempt against Soviet president Mikhail Gorbachev. Putin stated: "As soon as the coup began, I immediately decided which side I was on", although he said that the choice was hard because he had spent the best part of his life with "the organs".

== Political career ==
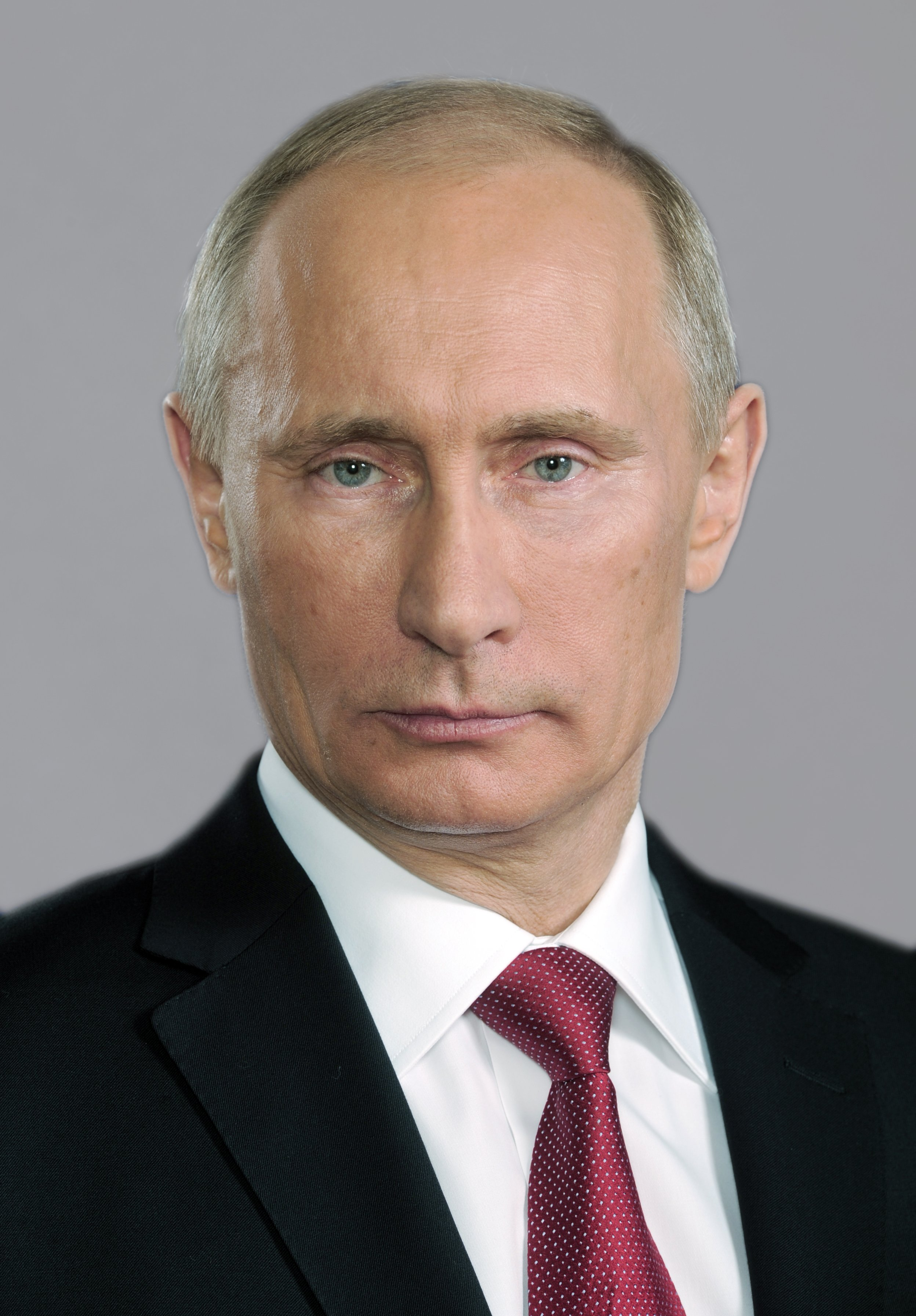
Putin's official portrait as president, 2012

Putin's political rise began in the Saint Petersburg administration (1990–1996), where in May 1990, he was appointed as an advisor on international affairs to Mayor Anatoly Sobchak. Shortly thereafter, in June 1991, he became the head of the Committee for External Relations of the Saint Petersburg Mayor's Office, overseeing the promotion of international ties, foreign investment, and the registration of business ventures. Though his tenure was marred by investigations from the city legislative council concerning discrepancies in asset valuation and the export of metals, Putin retained his position until 1996. During the mid-1990s, he expanded his responsibilities in Saint Petersburg, serving as first deputy head of the city administration and leading the local branch of the pro-government political party Our Home Is Russia, as well as participating in advisory roles with regional newspapers.

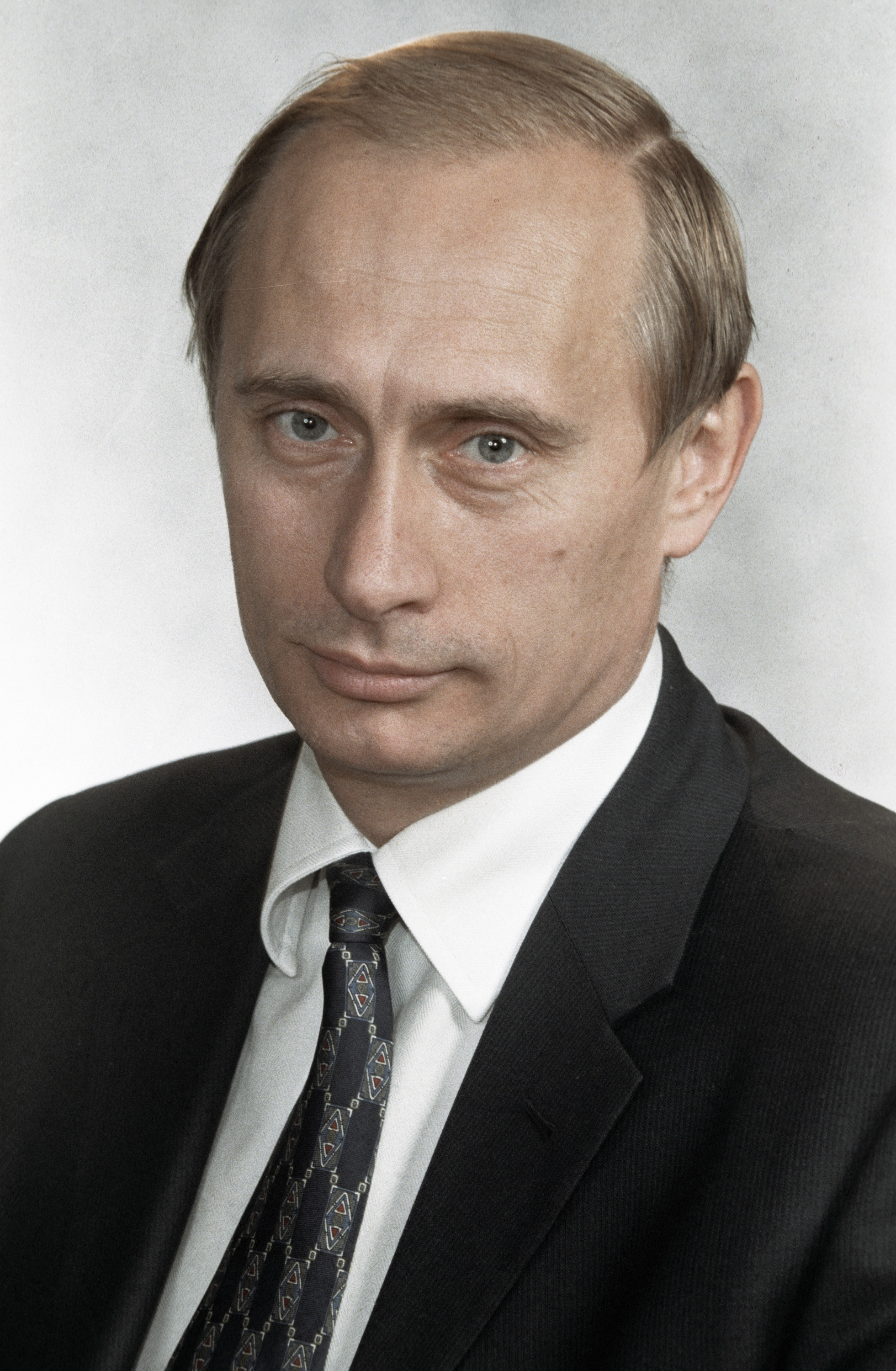
Putin as director of the Federal Security Service (FSB), 1998

Transitioning to the national scene in 1996, Putin was called to Moscow following the electoral defeat of Sobchak, where he assumed the role of Deputy Chief of the Presidential Property Management Department. In this capacity, he was responsible for managing the transfer of former Soviet assets to the Russian Federation. His career in Moscow advanced rapidly with his appointment in 1997 as deputy chief of the Presidential Staff and later as chief of the Main Control Directorate of the same department. A pivotal moment came in 1998 when President Boris Yeltsin appointed him director of the FSB, Russia's primary intelligence and security agency. In this role, Putin concentrated on reorganising and strengthening the agency after years of perceived decline, a period that would prove formative for his later approach to governance.

In 1999, Putin described communism as "a blind alley, far away from the mainstream of civilization". By 1999, Zyuganov was the evident frontrunner for the first round of the pending 2000 presidential election. However, by the autumn of 1999, Vladimir Putin had overtaken Zyuganov as leading candidate in the polls.

In August 1999, Putin's profile increased substantially when he was named one of the three First Deputy Prime Ministers, and later the acting Prime Minister following the dismissal of Sergei Stepashin's cabinet. Endorsed by Yeltsin as his preferred successor, Putin quickly capitalized on his law-and-order reputation and rose in popularity, winning the presidential election in March 2000 and being inaugurated on 7 May 2000. Throughout his subsequent terms, alternately serving as president and Prime Minister, Putin has overseen extensive reforms aimed at consolidating state power, restructuring federal relations, and curbing the influence of oligarchs. His tenure has been punctuated by significant foreign policy actions, including the controversial annexation of Crimea in 2014, military interventions in Syria, and ongoing involvement in the Russo-Ukrainian war, including a full-scale war with Ukraine since 2022.

Putin is formally not a card-carrying member of any parties, and as president he presents himself as the figure above party politics. Nevertheless, United Russia has been acting as his party since his rise to power. It was created by him in 2001 through merging the party of his supporters and associates Unity with the electoral bloc Fatherland – All Russia, partially with the goal of regulating political and business elites; since then, he has led the party de facto. Putin treats it as his own party, chaired it when serving as prime minister despite not becoming its formal member, has participated in its congresses and boosted it during electoral campaigns through directly associating himself with it personally and in Russian media, and the Russian elections are falsified to maintain the party's ruling status. Putin himself said in 2016 that he "initiated and created this party, the need for it was vital, first of all, to strengthen Russian statehood and consolidate society."

== Domestic policies ==
Putin's domestic policies, particularly early in his first presidency, were aimed at creating a vertical power structure. On 13 May 2000, he issued a decree organizing the 89 federal subjects of Russia into seven administrative federal districts and appointed a presidential envoy responsible for each of those districts (whose official title is Plenipotentiary Representative).

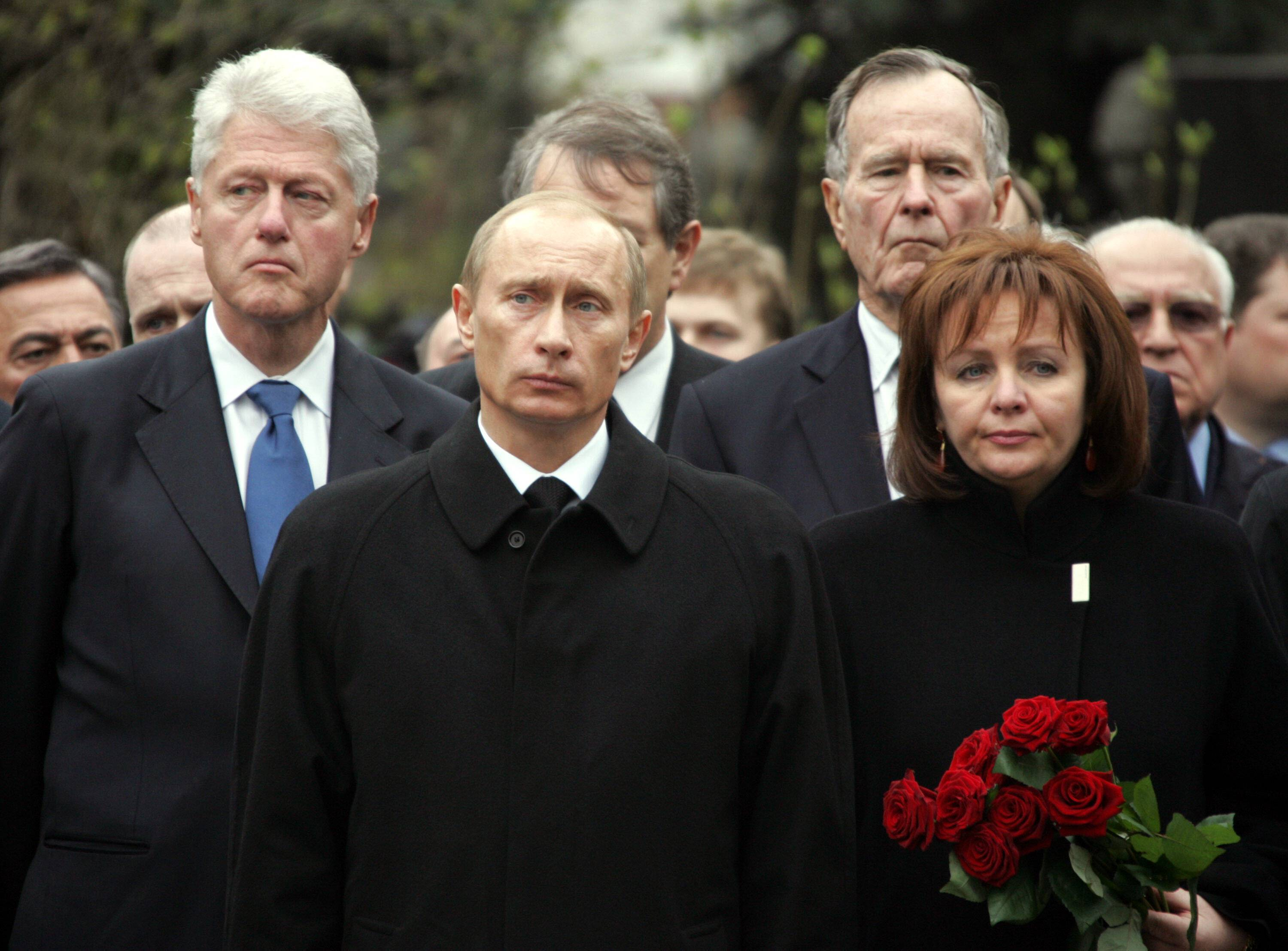
Putin (center) with his wife Ludmila and former U.S. presidents Bill Clinton and George H. W. Bush at the state funeral of Boris Yeltsin on 25 April 2007

According to Stephen White, under the presidency of Putin, Russia made it clear that it had no intention of establishing a "second edition" of the American or British political system, but rather a system that was closer to Russia's own traditions and circumstances. Some commentators have described Putin's administration as a "sovereign democracy". According to the proponents of that description (primarily Vladislav Surkov), the government's actions and policies ought above all to enjoy popular support within Russia itself and not be directed or influenced from outside the country.

The practice of the system is characterized by Swedish economist Anders Åslund as manual management, commenting: "After Putin resumed the presidency in 2012, his rule is best described as 'manual management' as the Russians like to put it. Putin does whatever he wants, with little consideration for the consequences, with one important caveat. During the Russian financial crash of August 1998, Putin learned that financial crises are politically destabilizing and must be avoided at all costs. Therefore, he cares about financial stability".

The period after 2012 saw mass protests against the falsification of elections, censorship, and the toughening of free assembly laws. In July 2000, according to a law proposed by Putin and approved by the Federal Assembly of Russia, Putin gained the right to dismiss the heads of the 89 federal subjects. In 2004, the direct election of those heads (usually called "governors") by popular vote was replaced with a system whereby they would be nominated by the president and approved or disapproved by regional legislatures.

This was seen by Putin as a necessary move to stop separatist tendencies and get rid of those governors who were connected with organized crime. This and other government actions effected under Putin's presidency have been criticized by many independent Russian media outlets and Western commentators as anti-democratic.

During his first term in office, Putin opposed some of the Yeltsin-era business oligarchs, as well as his political opponents, resulting in the exile or imprisonment of such people as Boris Berezovsky, Vladimir Gusinsky, and Mikhail Khodorkovsky; other oligarchs such as Roman Abramovich and Arkady Rotenberg are friends and allies with Putin. Putin succeeded in codifying land law and tax law and promulgated new codes on labour, administrative, criminal, commercial, and civil procedural law. Under Medvedev's presidency, Putin's government implemented some key reforms in the area of state security, the Russian police reform and the Russian military reform. During Putin's rule, the Communist Party of the Russian Federation has changed from radical, civil war-threatening to a component of the "systemic opposition" with criticism rarely more than rhetorical.

=== Economic, industrial, and energy policies ===
Sergey Guriyev, when talking about Putin's economic policy, divided it into four distinct periods: the "reform" years of his first term (1999–2003); the "statist" years of his second term (2004—the first half of 2008); the world economic crisis and recovery (the second half of 2008–2013); and the Russo-Ukrainian War, Russia's growing isolation from the global economy, and stagnation (2014–present).

In 2000, Putin launched the "Programme for the Socio-Economic Development of the Russian Federation for the Period 2000–2010", but it was abandoned in 2008 when it was 30% complete. Fueled by the 2000s commodities boom including record-high oil prices, under the Putin administration from 2000 to 2016, an increase in income in USD terms was 4.5 times. During Putin's first eight years in office, industry grew substantially, as did production, construction, real incomes, credit, and the middle class. A fund for oil revenue allowed Russia to repay the Soviet Union's debts by 2005. Russia joined the World Trade Organization in August 2012.

In 2006, Putin launched an industry consolidation programme to bring the main aircraft-producing companies under a single umbrella organization, the United Aircraft Corporation (UAC). In September 2020, the UAC general director announced that the UAC will receive the largest-ever post-Soviet government support package for the aircraft industry in order to pay and renegotiate the debt.

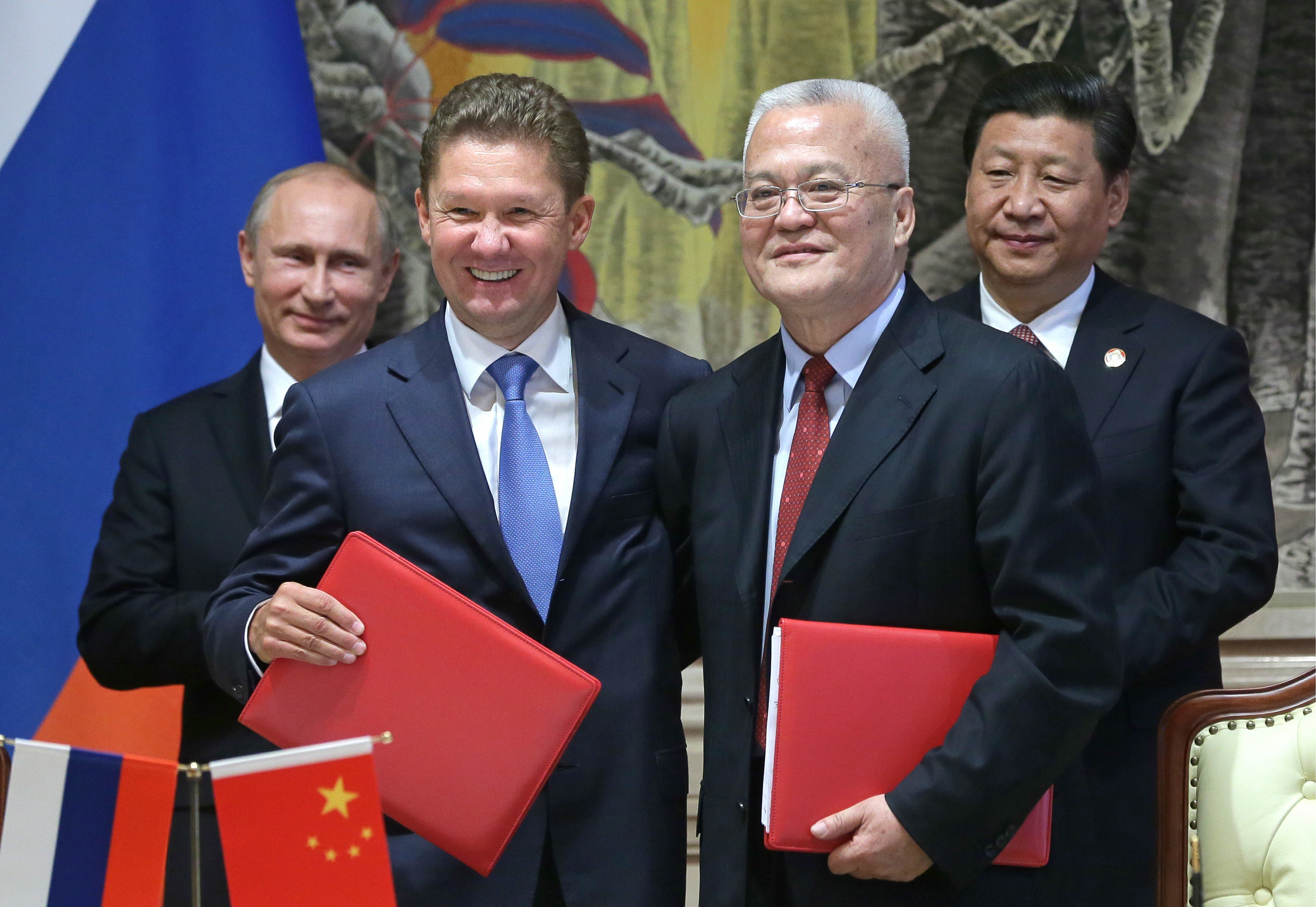
Putin, Gazprom CEO Alexey Miller, CNPC General Manager Zhou Jiping, and Chinese President Xi Jinping. The Russian economy is heavily dependent on the export of natural resources such as oil and natural gas.

In 2014, Putin signed a deal to supply China with 38 billion cubic meters of natural gas per year. Power of Siberia, which Putin has called the "world's biggest construction project", was launched in 2019 and is expected to continue for 30 years at an ultimate cost to China of $400 billion. The ongoing financial crisis began in the second half of 2014 when the Russian ruble collapsed due to a decline in the price of oil and international sanctions against Russia. These events in turn led to loss of investor confidence and capital flight, although it has also been argued that the sanctions had little to no effect on Russia's economy. In 2014, the Organized Crime and Corruption Reporting Project named Putin their Person of the Year for furthering corruption and organized crime.

According to Meduza, Putin has since 2007 predicted on several occasions that Russia will become one of the world's five largest economies. In 2013, he said Russia was one of the five biggest economies in terms of gross domestic product but still lagged behind other countries on indicators such as labour productivity. By the end of 2023, Putin planned to spend almost 40% of public expenditures on defense and security.

=== Environmental policy ===
In 2004, Putin signed the Kyoto Protocol treaty designed to reduce greenhouse gas emissions. However, Russia did not face mandatory cuts, because the Kyoto Protocol limits emissions to a percentage increase or decrease from 1990 levels and Russia's greenhouse-gas emissions fell well below the 1990 baseline due to a drop in economic output after the breakup of the Soviet Union, excluding emissions from land use, land-use change and forestry (LULUCF).

In 2019, Russia joined the Paris Agreement. Russia's goal is to reach net zero by 2060, but its energy strategy to 2035 is mostly about burning more fossil fuels. Reporting military emissions is voluntary and, as of 2024, no data is available since before the 2022 Russian invasion of Ukraine.

Putin described climate change as a concerning fact with big consequences for Russia. Though he expressed doubt that climate change was man-made, he stated that Russia will try to reduce man-made emissions with forests and "low-emission energy", such as natural gas, nuclear energy, and hydroenergy. He also argued that rich countries should provide finance and technology to those with less money for lower emissions. Energy expert Tatiana Lanshina described his policy as "mimicry of climate policy", accusing him of turning environmentalism into a tool of political influence.

=== Religious policy ===
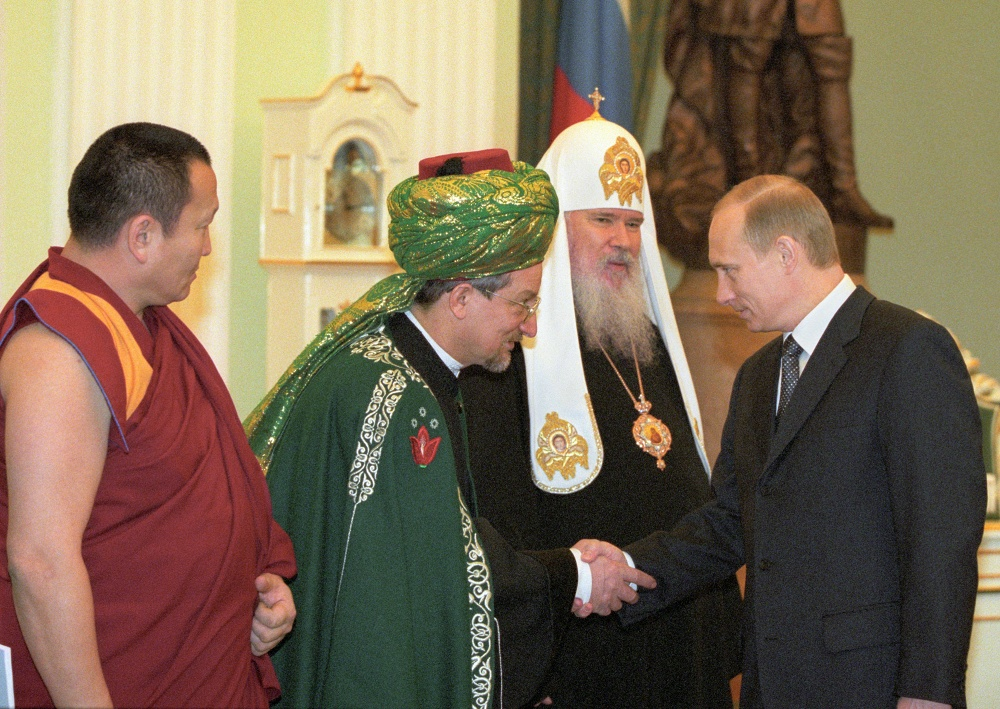
Putin with religious leaders of Russia, February 2001

Putin regularly attends the most important services of the Russian Orthodox Church on the main holy days and has established a good relationship with Patriarchs of the Russian Church, the late Alexy II of Moscow and the current Kirill of Moscow. As president, Putin took an active personal part in promoting the Act of Canonical Communion with the Moscow Patriarchate, signed 17 May 2007, which restored relations between the Moscow-based Russian Orthodox Church and the Russian Orthodox Church Outside Russia after the 80-year schism.

Under Putin, the Hasidic Federation of Jewish Communities of Russia became increasingly influential within the Jewish community, partly due to the influence of Federation-supporting businessmen mediated through their alliances with Putin, notably Lev Leviev and Roman Abramovich. According to the Jewish Telegraphic Agency, Putin is popular amongst the Russian Jewish community, who see him as a force for stability. Russia's chief rabbi, Berel Lazar, said Putin "paid great attention to the needs of our community and related to us with a deep respect". In 2016, Ronald S. Lauder, the president of the World Jewish Congress, also praised Putin for making Russia "a country where Jews are welcome".

Human rights organizations and religious freedom advocates have criticized the state of religious freedom in Russia. In 2016, Putin oversaw the passage of legislation that prohibited missionary activity in Russia. Nonviolent religious minority groups have been repressed under anti-extremism laws, especially Jehovah's Witnesses. One of the 2020 amendments to the Constitution of Russia directly refers to belief in God.

=== Military development ===
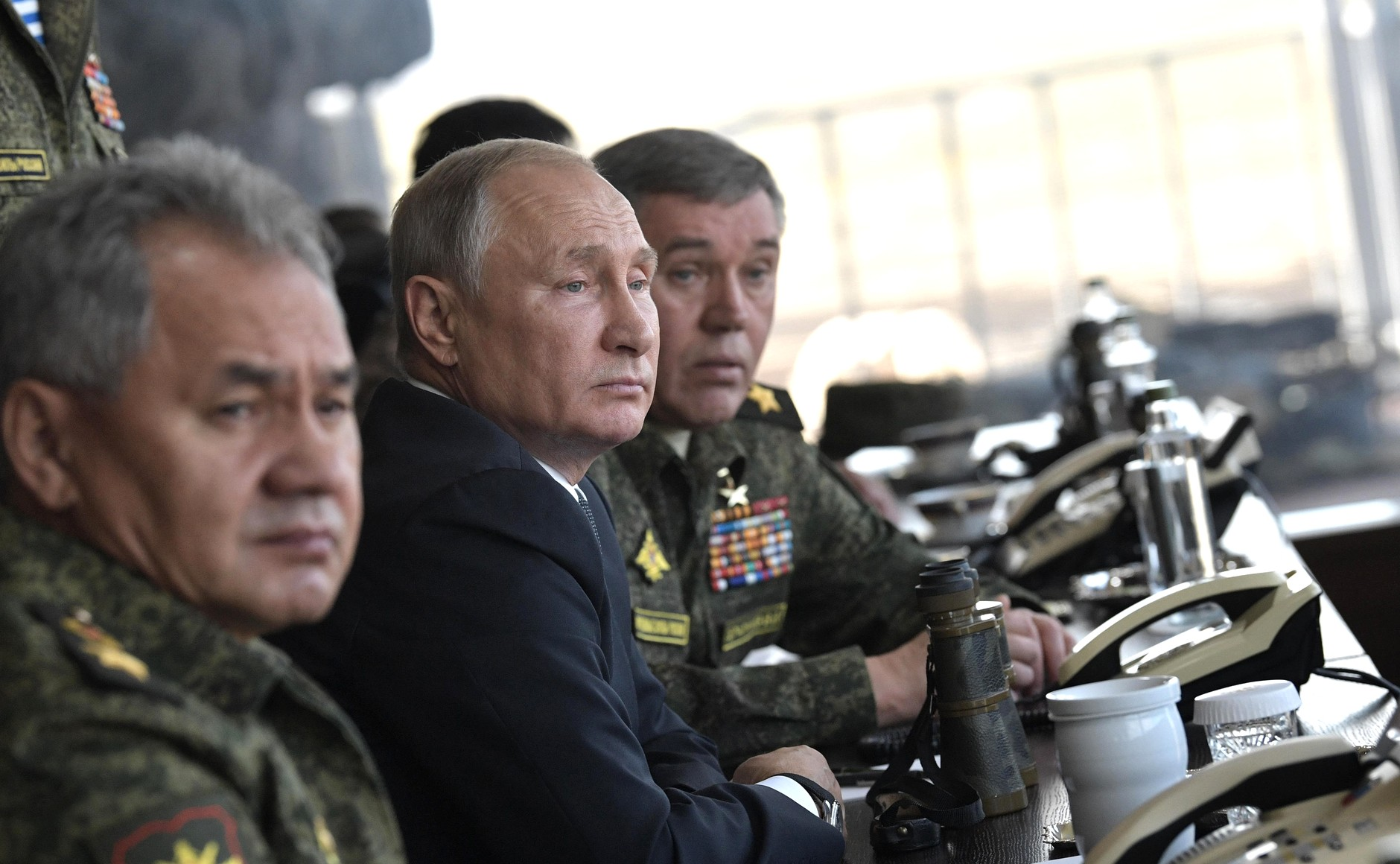
Putin with Russia's long-serving Defense Minister Sergei Shoigu (left) and Chief of the General Staff Valery Gerasimov at the Vostok 2018 military exercise

The resumption of long-distance flights of Russia's strategic bombers was followed by the announcement by Russian defense minister Anatoliy Serdyukov during his meeting with Putin on 5 December 2007, that 11 ships, including the aircraft carrier Kuznetsov, would take part in the first major navy sortie into the Mediterranean since Soviet times.

Key elements of the reform included reducing the armed forces to a strength of one million, reducing the number of officers, centralizing officer training from 65 military schools into 10 systemic military training centers, creating a professional NCO corps, reducing the size of the central command, introducing more civilian logistics and auxiliary staff, elimination of cadre-strength formations, reorganizing the reserves, reorganizing the army into a brigade system, and reorganizing air forces into an airbase system instead of regiments.

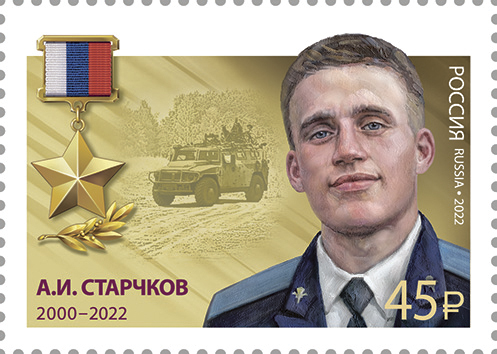
Russian postage stamp honoring a soldier killed in the 2022 Russian invasion of Ukraine

According to the Kremlin, Putin embarked on a build-up of Russia's nuclear capabilities because of U.S. president George W. Bush's unilateral decision to withdraw from the 1972 Anti-Ballistic Missile Treaty. To counter what Putin sees as the United States' goal of undermining Russia's strategic nuclear deterrent, Moscow has embarked on a program to develop new weapons capable of defeating any new American ballistic missile defense or interception system. Some analysts believe that this nuclear strategy under Putin has brought Russia into violation of the 1987 Intermediate-Range Nuclear Forces Treaty.

Accordingly, U.S. President Donald Trump announced the U.S. would no longer consider itself bound by the treaty's provisions, raising nuclear tensions between the two powers. This prompted Putin to state that Russia would not launch first in a nuclear conflict but that "an aggressor should know that vengeance is inevitable, that he will be annihilated, and we would be the victims of the aggression. We will go to heaven as martyrs".

Putin has also sought to increase Russian territorial claims in the Arctic and its military presence there. In August 2007, Russian expedition Arktika 2007, part of research related to the 2001 Russian territorial extension claim, planted a flag on the seabed at the North Pole. Both Russian submarines and troops deployed in the Arctic have been increasing.

=== Human rights policy ===
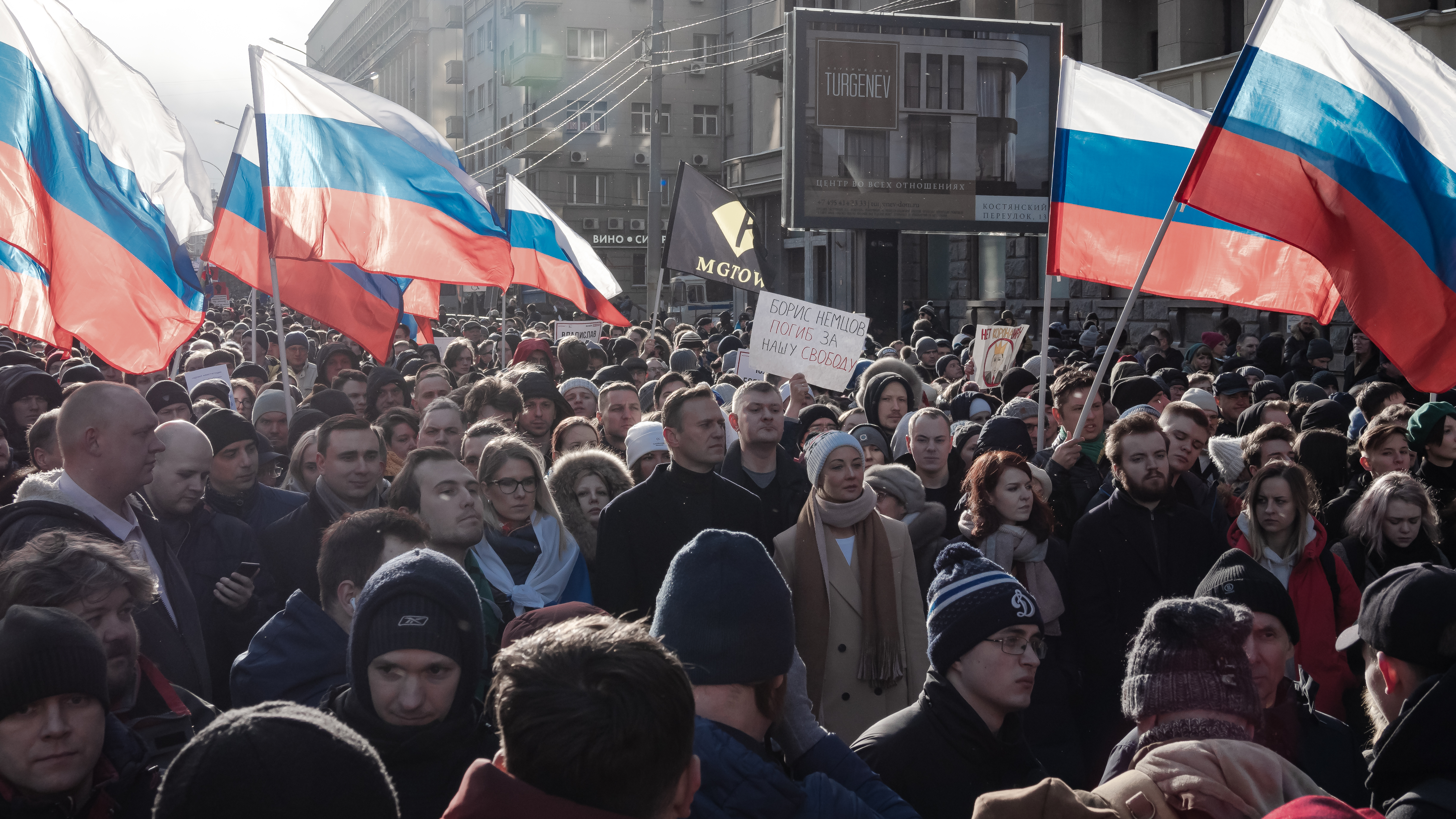
Russian opposition politician Alexei Navalny attends a march in memory of assassinated opposition politician Boris Nemtsov, Moscow, 29 February 2020

New York City–based NGO Human Rights Watch, in a report titled Laws of Attrition, authored by Hugh Williamson, the British director of HRW's Europe & Central Asia Division, has claimed that since May 2012, when Putin was reelected as president, Russia has enacted many restrictive laws, started inspections of non-governmental organizations, harassed, intimidated and imprisoned political activists, and started to restrict critics. The new laws include the "foreign agents" law, which is widely regarded as overbroad by including Russian human rights organizations that receive some international grant funding, the treason law, and the assembly law, which penalizes many expressions of dissent. Human rights activists have criticized Russia for censoring speech of LGBT activists due to "the gay propaganda law" and increasing violence against LGBT+ people due to the law.

In 2020, Putin signed a law on labelling individuals and organizations receiving funding from abroad as "foreign agents". The law is an expansion of "foreign agent" legislation adopted in 2012.

As of June 2020, per the Memorial Human Rights Center, there were 380 political prisoners in Russia, including 63 individuals prosecuted, directly or indirectly, for political activities (including Alexey Navalny) and 245 prosecuted for their involvement with one of the Muslim organizations that are banned in Russia. 78 individuals on the list, i.e., more than 20% of the total, are residents of Crimea. As of December 2022, more than 4,000 people were prosecuted for criticizing the war in Ukraine under Russia's war censorship laws.

=== Media ===
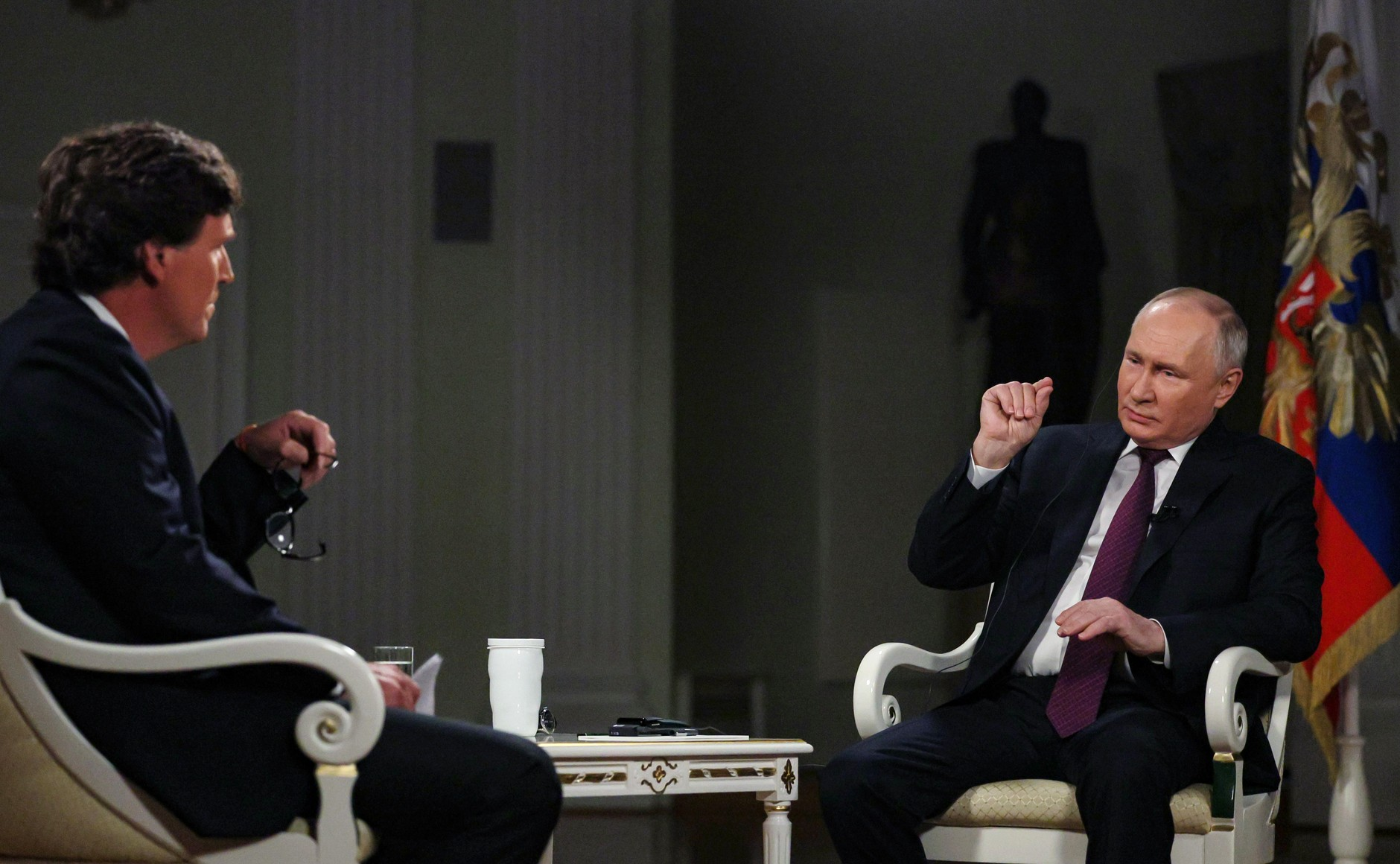
Putin being interviewed by Tucker Carlson on 6 February 2024

Scott Gehlbach, a professor of Political Science at the University of Wisconsin–Madison, has claimed that since 1999, Putin has systematically punished journalists who challenge his official point of view. Maria Lipman, an American writing in Foreign Affairs claims, "The crackdown that followed Putin's return to the Kremlin in 2012 extended to the liberal media, which had until then been allowed to operate fairly independently". The Internet has attracted Putin's attention because his critics have tried to use it to challenge his control of information. Marian K. Leighton, who worked for the CIA as a Soviet analyst in the 1980s, says, "Having muzzled Russia's print and broadcast media, Putin focused his energies on the Internet."

Robert W. Orttung and Christopher Walker reported that "Reporters Without Borders, for instance, ranked Russia 148 in its 2013 list of 179 countries in terms of freedom of the press. It particularly criticized Russia for the crackdown on the political opposition and the failure of the authorities to vigorously pursue and bring to justice criminals who have murdered journalists. Freedom House ranks Russian media as "not free", indicating that basic safeguards and guarantees for journalists and media enterprises are absent. About two-thirds of Russians use television as their primary source of daily news, while around 85% of Russians get most of their information from Russian state media.

In the early 2000s, Putin and his circle began promoting the idea in Russian media that they are the modern-day version of the 17th-century Romanov tsars who ended Russia's "Time of Troubles", meaning they claim to be the peacemakers and stabilizers after the fall of the Soviet Union. Since the 2022 Ukraine invasion, Putin has only once granted an interview to a Western journalist, namely Tucker Carlson in February 2024.

=== Promoting conservatism ===
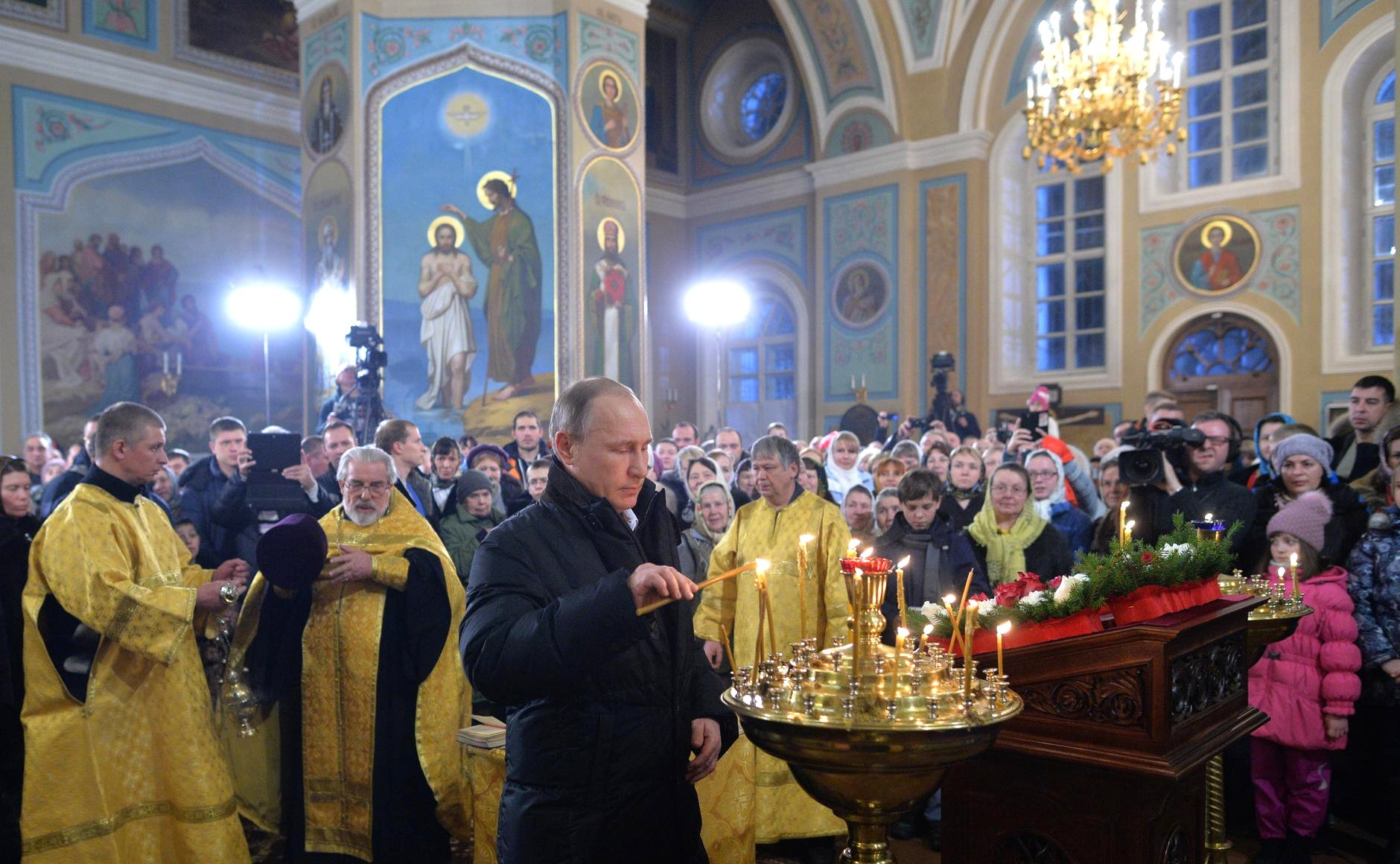
Putin attends the Orthodox Christmas service in the village of Turginovo in Kalininsky District, Tver Oblast, 7 January 2016

Putin has promoted explicitly conservative policies in social, cultural, and political matters, both at home and abroad. Putin has attacked globalism and neoliberalism and is identified by scholars with Russian conservatism. Putin has promoted new think tanks that bring together like-minded intellectuals and writers. For example, the Izborsky Club, founded in 2012 by the conservative right-wing journalist Alexander Prokhanov, stresses (i) Russian nationalism, (ii) the restoration of Russia's historical greatness, and (iii) systematic opposition to liberal ideas and policies. Vladislav Surkov, a senior government official, has been one of the key economic consultants during Putin's presidency. Leonid Bershidsky analyzed Putin's interview with the Financial Times and concluded, "Putin is an imperialist of the old Soviet school, rather than a nationalist or a racist, and he has cooperated with, and promoted, people who are known to be gay".

In cultural and social affairs, Putin has collaborated closely with the Russian Orthodox Church. Patriarch Kirill of Moscow, head of the Church, endorsed his election in 2012 stating Putin's terms were like "a miracle of God". Steven Myers reports, "The church, once heavily repressed, had emerged from the Soviet collapse as one of the most respected ... Now Kiril led the faithful directly into an alliance with the state".

Mark Woods, a Baptist Union of Great Britain minister and contributing editor to Christian Today, provides specific examples of how the Church has backed the expansion of Russian power into Crimea and eastern Ukraine. Some Russian Orthodox believers consider Putin a corrupt and brutal strongman or even a tyrant. Others do not admire him but appreciate that he aggravates their political opponents. Still others appreciate that Putin defends some although not all Orthodox teachings, whether he believes in them himself.

On abortion, Putin stated: "In the modern world, the decision is up to the woman herself". This put him at odds with the Russian Orthodox Church. In 2020, he supported efforts to reduce the number of abortions instead of prohibiting it. On 28 November 2023, during a speech to the World Russian People's Council, Putin urged Russian women to have "seven, eight, or even more children" and said "large families must become the norm, a way of life for all of Russia's people".

Putin supported the 2020 Russian constitutional referendum, which passed and defined marriage as a relationship between one man and one woman in the Constitution of Russia.

=== International sporting events ===
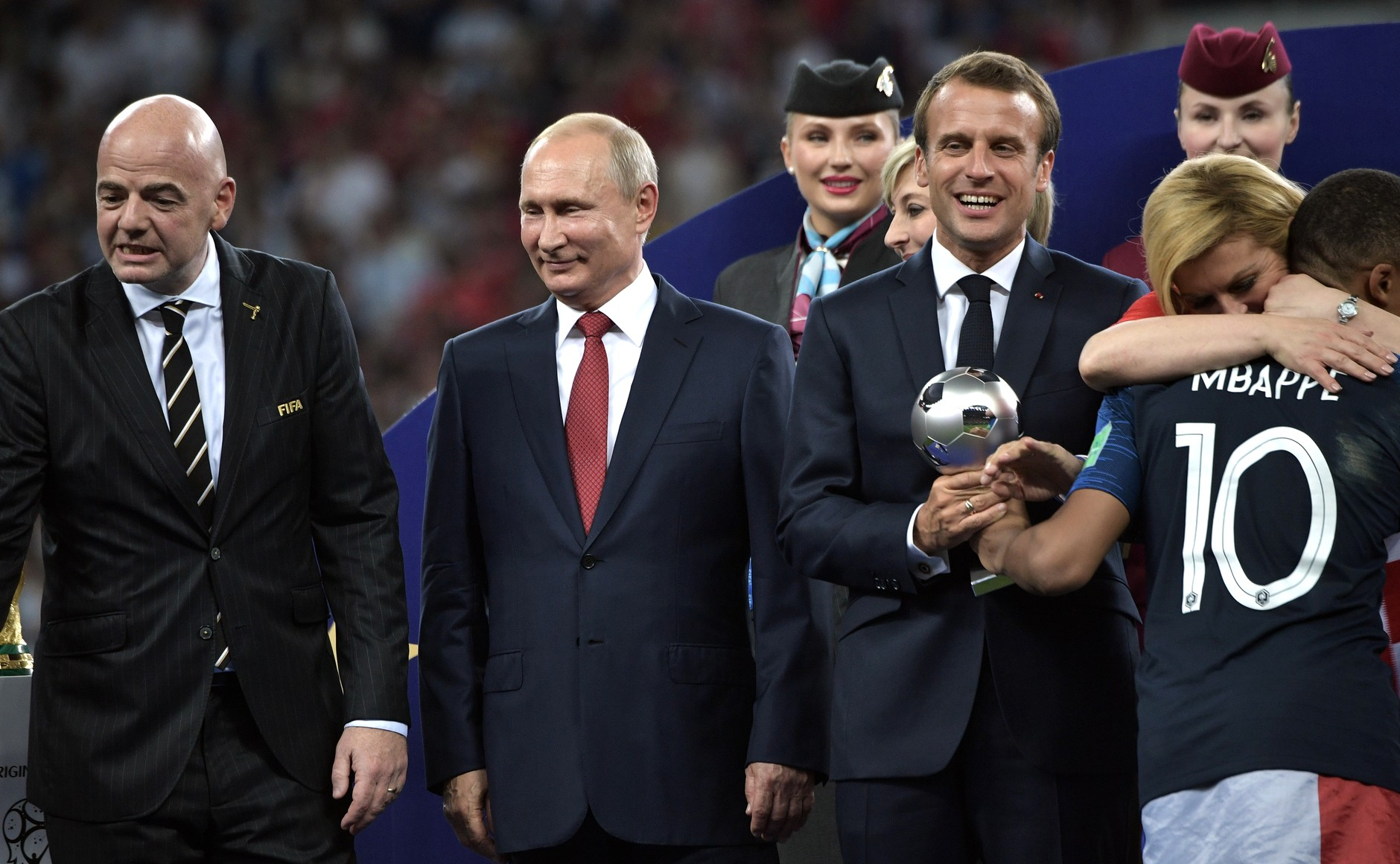
Putin, FIFA president Gianni Infantino, French president Emmanuel Macron and Croatian former president Kolinda Grabar-Kitarović at the 2018 FIFA World Cup Final in Russia, as French forward Kylian Mbappé receives the best young player award

In 2007, Putin led a successful effort on behalf of Sochi for the 2014 Winter Olympics and the 2014 Winter Paralympics, the first Winter Olympic Games to ever be hosted by Russia. In 2008, the city of Kazan won the bid for the 2013 Summer Universiade; on 2 December 2010, Russia won the right to host the 2017 FIFA Confederations Cup and 2018 FIFA World Cup, also for the first time in Russian history. In 2013, Putin stated that gay athletes would not face any discrimination at the 2014 Sochi Winter Olympics.

=== Historical memory ===
Putin has made extensive use of historical memory, in particular that of World War II and the Holocaust and Generalplan Ost, as a tool of legitimation of his foreign policy. Putin has de-emphasised the anti-Jewish character of the Holocaust in official statements about it and commemorations of it, instead often referring to the more general "genocide of the Soviet peoples". Putin has also engaged in what commentators have called a rhetorical war over historical memory with countries like Ukraine and the Baltic states, frequently bringing up the fact that many nationalists from those countries collaborated with Nazi Germany and framing contemporary Ukraine and NATO as the spiritual successors of Nazi Germany. By presenting the Soviet Union as the chief victim of Nazi Germany, Putin has also attacked the notion of the Soviet Union's co-responsibility for starting World War II in Europe through the Molotov-Ribbentrop Pact.

== Foreign policy ==
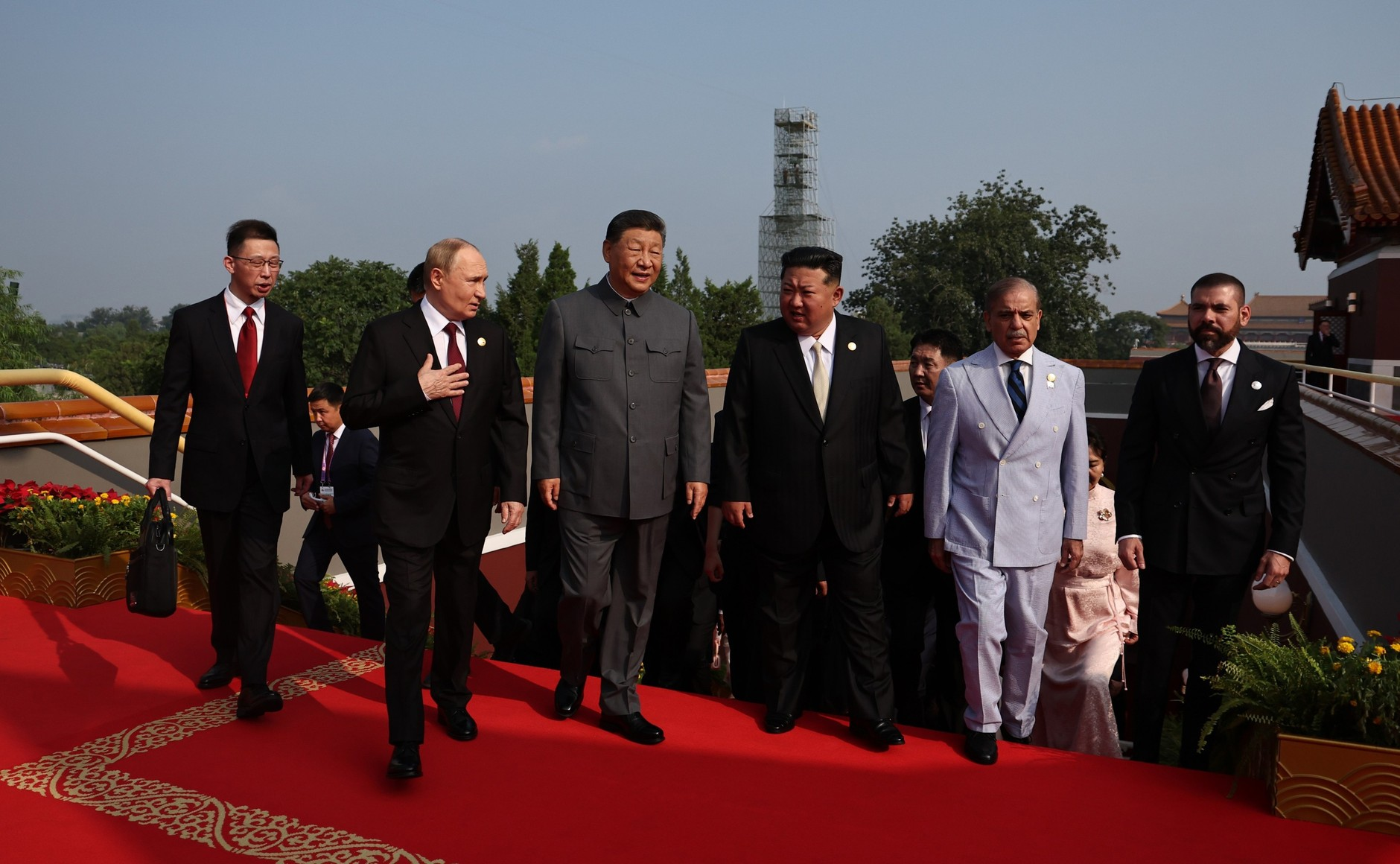
Putin together with North Korean leader Kim Jong Un, Chinese leader Xi Jinping, and Pakistani Prime Minister Shehbaz Sharif during the 2025 China Victory Day Parade

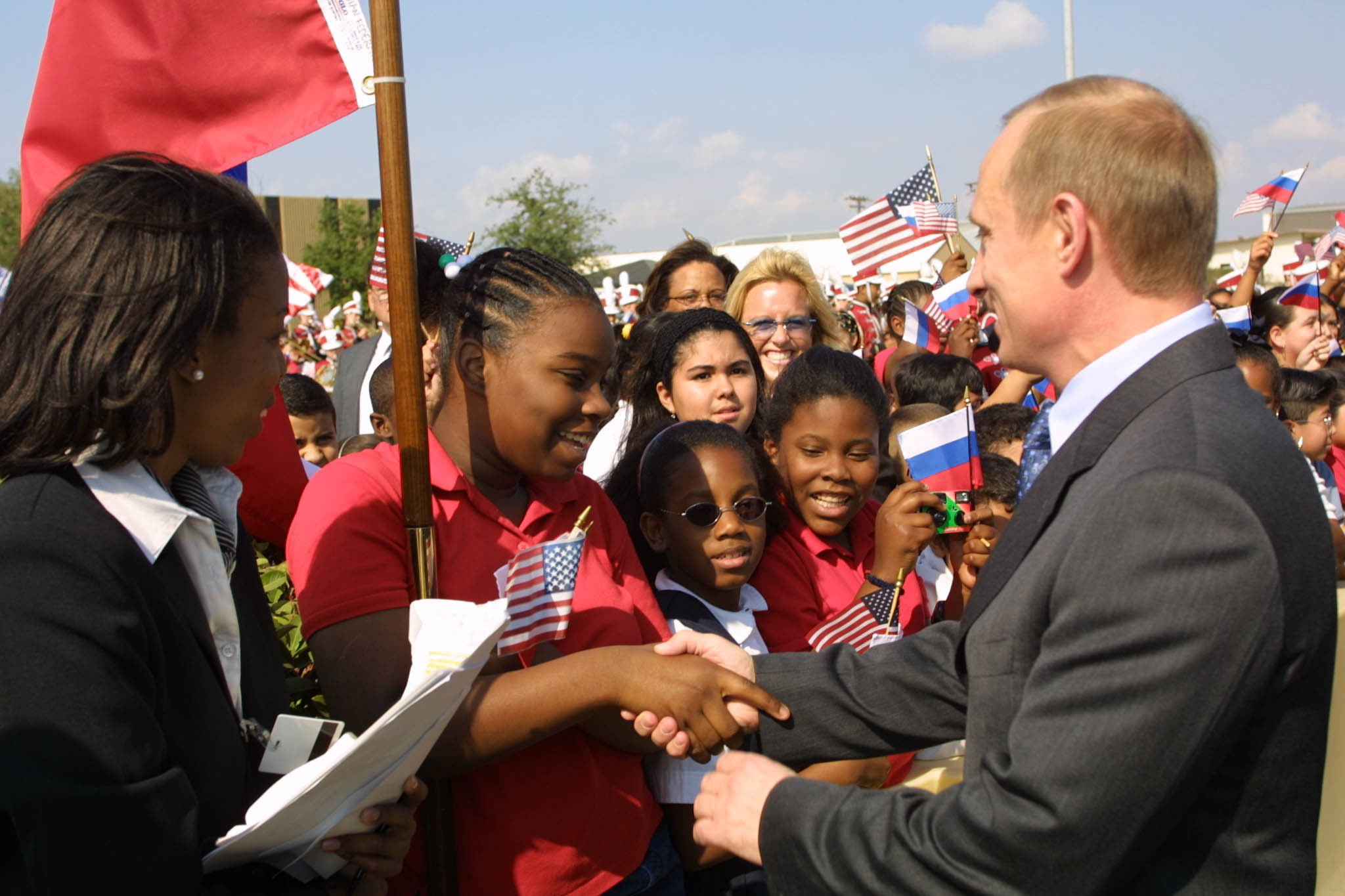
Putin's visit to the United States, November 2001

Generally, Putin's tenure experienced tensions with the West, as well as stronger relations with China. Anna Borshchevskaya, in her 2022 book, summarizes Putin's main foreign policy objectives as originating in his 30 December 1999 document, which appeared on the government's website, "Russia at the Turn of the Millennium". She presents Putin as orienting himself to the plan that "Russia is a country with unique values in danger of losing its unity – which... is a historic Russian fear. This again points to the fundamental issue of Russia's identity issues – and how the state had manipulated these to drive anti-Western security narratives to erode the US-led global order... Moreover, a look at Russia's distribution of forces over the years under Putin has been heavily weighted towards the south (Syria, Ukraine, Middle East), another indicator of the Kremlin's threat perceptions".

Putin spoke favorably of artificial intelligence regarding foreign policy, "Artificial intelligence is the future, not only for Russia, but for all humankind. It comes with colossal opportunities, but also threats that are difficult to predict. Whoever becomes the leader in this sphere will become the ruler of the world".

=== Asia-Pacific ===
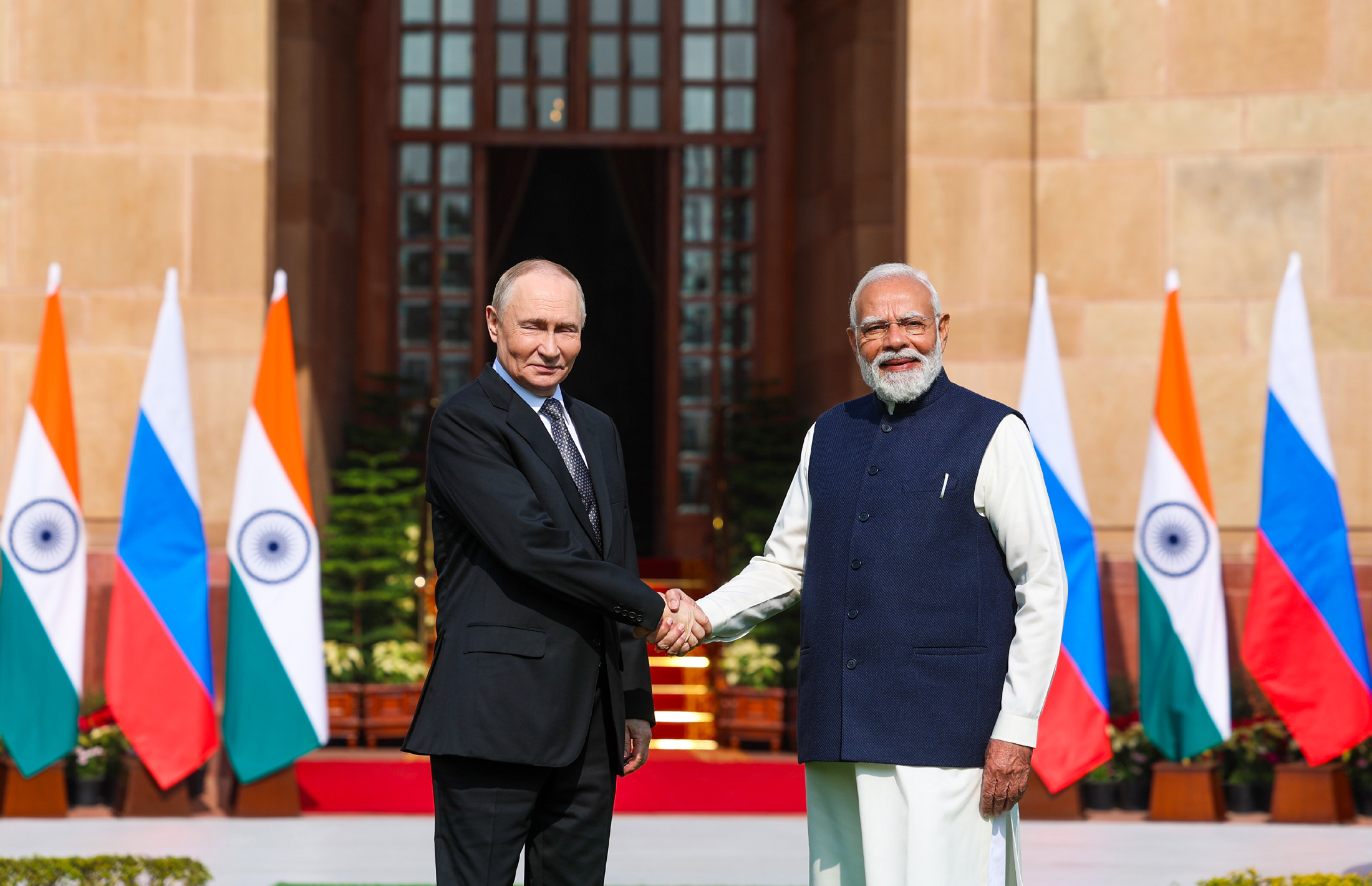
Putin with Indian Prime Minister Narendra Modi in New Delhi, India, 5 December 2025

In 2012, Putin wrote an article in Indian newspaper The Hindu, saying: "The Declaration on Strategic Partnership between India and Russia signed in October 2000 became a truly historic step". India remains the largest customer of Russian military equipment, and the two countries share a historically strong strategic and diplomatic relationship. In October 2022, Putin described India and China as "close allies and partners". Under Putin, Russia has maintained positive relations with the Asian states of SCO and BRICS, which include China, India, Pakistan, and post-Soviet states of Central Asia.

Putin and Prime Minister Shinzo Abe frequently met each other to discuss the Japan–Russia territorial disputes. Putin also voiced his willingness to construct a rail bridge between the two countries. Despite numerous meetings, no agreement was signed before Abe's resignation in 2020. Putin also made the first Russian or Soviet leader to visit North Korea, meeting Kim Jong Il in July 2000, shortly after a visit to South Korea.

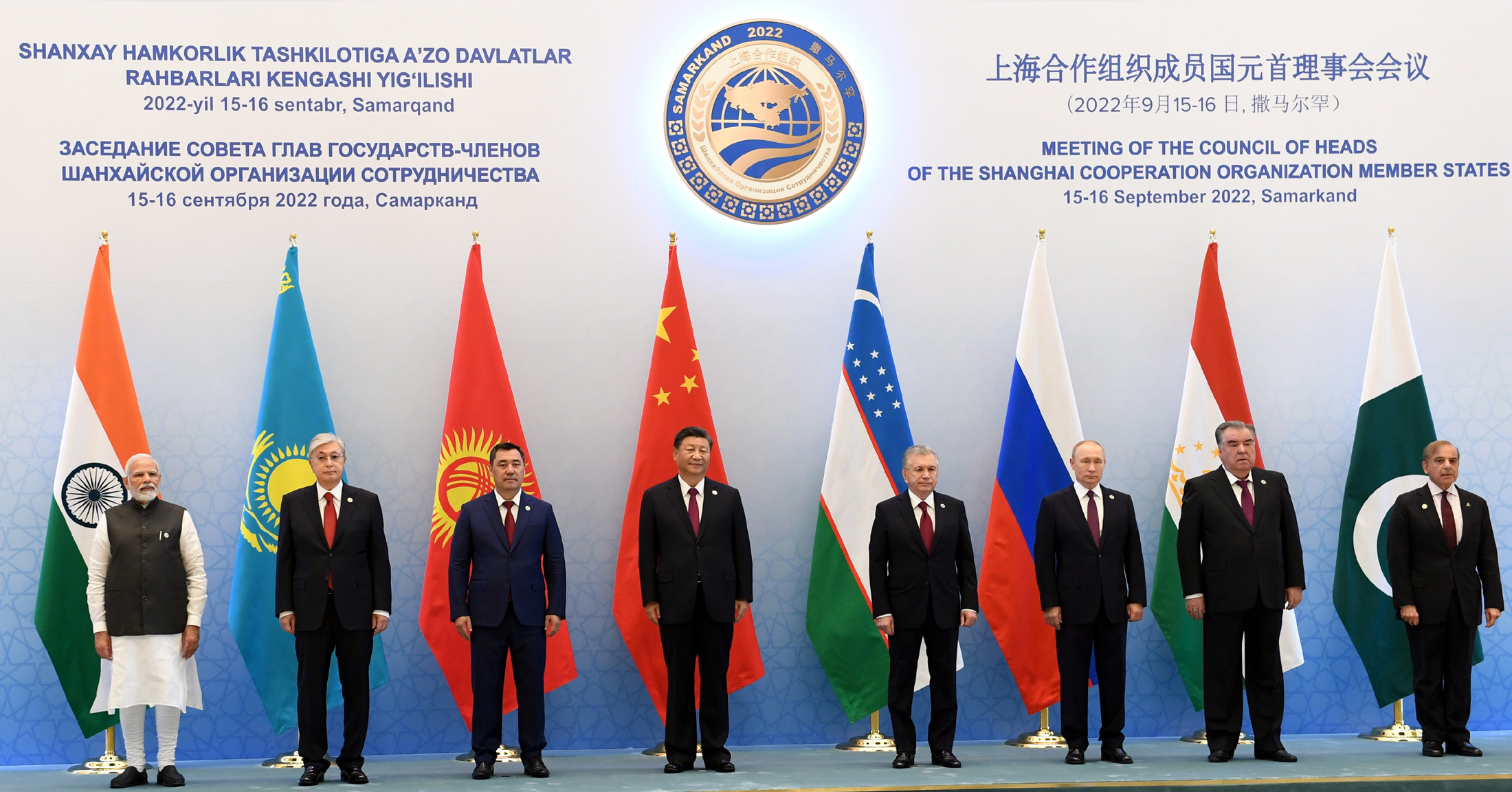
Putin with Chinese president Xi Jinping and other leaders at the Shanghai Cooperation Organisation summit in Uzbekistan on 16 September 2022

Putin made three visits to Mongolia and has enjoyed good relations with its neighbor. Putin and his Mongolian counterpart signed a permanent treaty on friendship between the two states in September 2019, further enhancing trade and cultural exchanges. Putin became the first Russian or Soviet leader to visit Indonesia in half a century in 2007, resulting in the signing of an arms deal. In another visit, Putin commented on long-standing ties and friendship between Russia and Indonesia. Russia has also boosted relations with Vietnam after 2011, and with Afghanistan in the 2010s, giving military and economic aid. The relations between Russia and the Philippines received a boost in 2016 as Putin forged closer bilateral ties with his Filipino counterpart, Rodrigo Duterte. Putin has good relations with Malaysia and its then Prime Minister Mahathir Mohamad. Putin criticized violence in Myanmar against the Rohingya minorities in 2017. Following the 2021 Myanmar coup d'état, Russia has pledged to boost ties with the Myanmar military regime.

In September 2007, Putin attended the APEC meeting held in Sydney, Australia, where he met with Prime Minister John Howard and signed a uranium trade deal for Australia to sell uranium to Russia. This was the first visit by a Russian president to Australia. Putin again visited Australia for 2014 G20 Brisbane summit. The Abbott government denounced Putin's use of military force in Ukraine in 2014 as "bullying" and "utterly unacceptable". Amid calls to ban Putin from attending the 2014 G20 Summit, Prime Minister Tony Abbott said he would "shirtfront" (challenge) the Russian leader over the shooting down of MH17 by Russian-backed rebels, which had killed 38 Australians. Putin denied responsibility for the killings.

=== China ===
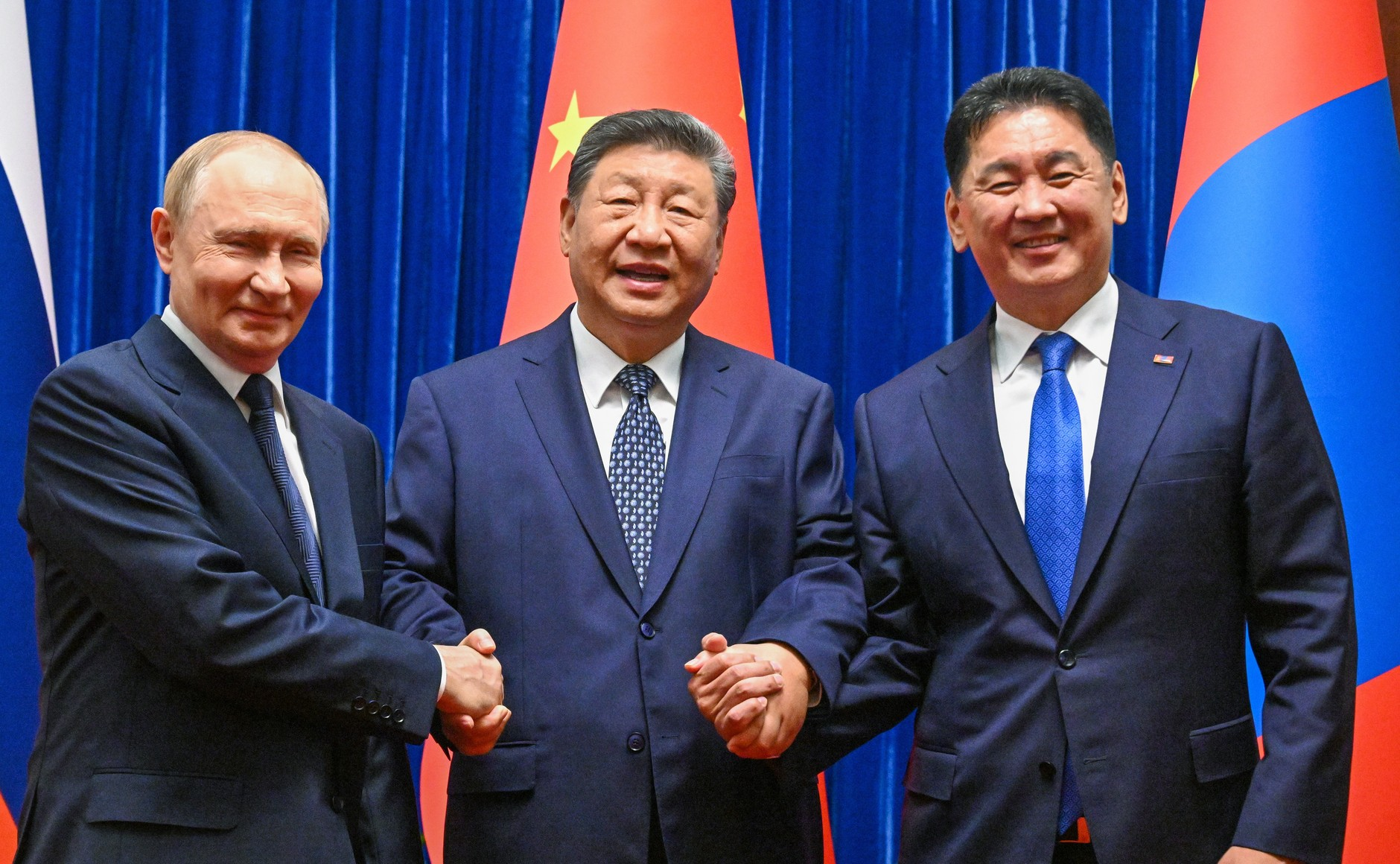
Putin with Chinese President Xi Jinping and Mongolian President Ukhnaagiin Khürelsükh in Beijing, China, 2 September 2025

In the 21st century, Sino-Russian relations have significantly strengthened bilaterally and economically—the Treaty of Friendship, and the construction of the ESPO oil pipeline and the Power of Siberia gas pipeline formed a "special relationship" between the two great powers. Putin and Chinese leader Hu Jintao held their first meeting in December 2002. The two leaders met regularly, meeting face to face five or six times a year. Russian Prime Minister Dimitry Medvedev and Chinese Premier Wen Jiabao also met regularly, with Wen quipping in 2007 that "We didn't even use prepared speeches." China backed Russia in the Second Chechen War and regards to Russia's concerns of NATO expansion, while Russia backed China regarding the issues of Taiwan, Tibet and Xinjiang. The two countries also increasingly cooperated in the United Nations Security Council.

On the eve of a 2013 state visit to Moscow by Chinese leader Xi Jinping, Putin remarked that the two nations were forging a special relationship. Xi visited the Operational Command Headquarters of the Russian Armed Forces, the first time a foreign leader visited the building. Ties have continued to deepen after the 2022 Russian invasion of Ukraine, with Russia increasingly becoming dependent on China while it is under large-scale international sanctions.

=== Post-Soviet states ===
Post-Soviet states in English alphabetical order: 1. Armenia; 2. Azerbaijan; 3. Belarus; 4. Estonia; 5. Georgia; 6. Kazakhstan; 7. Kyrgyzstan; 8. Latvia; 9. Lithuania; 10. Moldova; 11. Russia; 12. Tajikistan; 13. Turkmenistan; 14. Ukraine; 15. Uzbekistan

Under Putin, the Kremlin has consistently stated that Russia has a sphere of influence and "privileged interests" over other post-Soviet states, which are referred to as the "near abroad" in Russia. It has also been stated that the post-Soviet states are strategically vital to Russian interests. Some Russia experts have compared this concept to the Monroe Doctrine.

A series of so-called colour revolutions in the post-Soviet states, namely the Rose Revolution in Georgia in 2003, the Orange Revolution in Ukraine in 2004, and the Tulip Revolution in Kyrgyzstan in 2005, led to frictions in the relations of those countries with Russia. In December 2004, Putin criticized the Rose and Orange revolutions, saying: "If you have permanent revolutions, you risk plunging the post-Soviet space into endless conflict."

Putin allegedly declared at a NATO-Russia summit in 2008 that if Ukraine joined NATO, Russia could contend to annex the Ukrainian East and Crimea. At the summit, he told U.S. President George W. Bush that "Ukraine is not even a state!", while the following year, Putin referred to Ukraine as "Little Russia". Following the Revolution of Dignity in March 2014, the Russian Federation annexed Crimea. According to Putin, this was done because "Crimea has always been and remains an inseparable part of Russia."

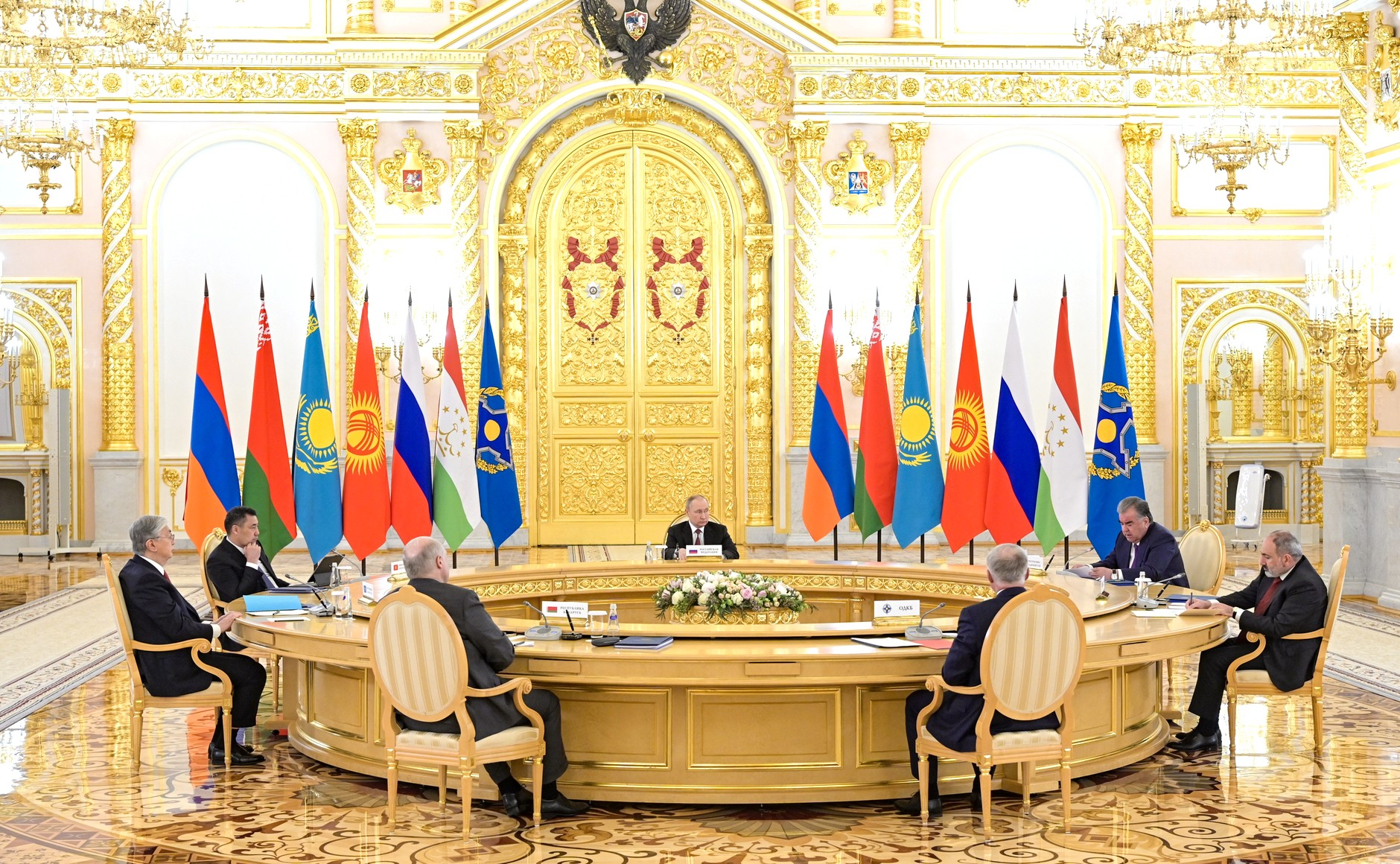
Putin hosted a meeting of the Russian-led military alliance, the Collective Security Treaty Organization (CSTO), in Moscow on 16 May 2022.

After the Russian annexation of Crimea, he said that Ukraine includes "regions of Russia's historic south" and "was created on a whim by the Bolsheviks". He went on to declare that the February 2014 ousting of Ukrainian President Viktor Yanukovych had been orchestrated by the West as an attempt to weaken Russia. In a July 2014 speech during the Russian-supported armed insurgency in Eastern Ukraine, Putin stated he would use Russia's "entire arsenal of available means" up to "operations under international humanitarian law and the right of self-defense" to protect Russian speakers outside Russia.

In late August 2014, Putin stated: "People who have their own views on history and the history of our country may argue with me, but it seems to me that the Russian and Ukrainian peoples are practically one people." After making a similar statement, in late December 2015, he stated: "the Ukrainian culture, as well as Ukrainian literature, surely has a source of its own". In July 2021, he published a lengthy article On the Historical Unity of Russians and Ukrainians revisiting these themes, and saying the formation of a Ukrainian state hostile to Moscow was "comparable in its consequences to the use of weapons of mass destruction against us"—it was made mandatory reading for military-political training in the Russian Armed Forces.

During the Russo-Ukrainian war, Putin set out several conditions for a peace agreement, which included permanent Ukrainian neutrality, limits on the size of Ukraine's military, and the cession of four southeastern regions annexed by Russia in 2022 but not fully controlled by Russian forces. Ukraine rejected the terms, which Western officials and analysts said would effectively compromise the country's sovereignty and independence.

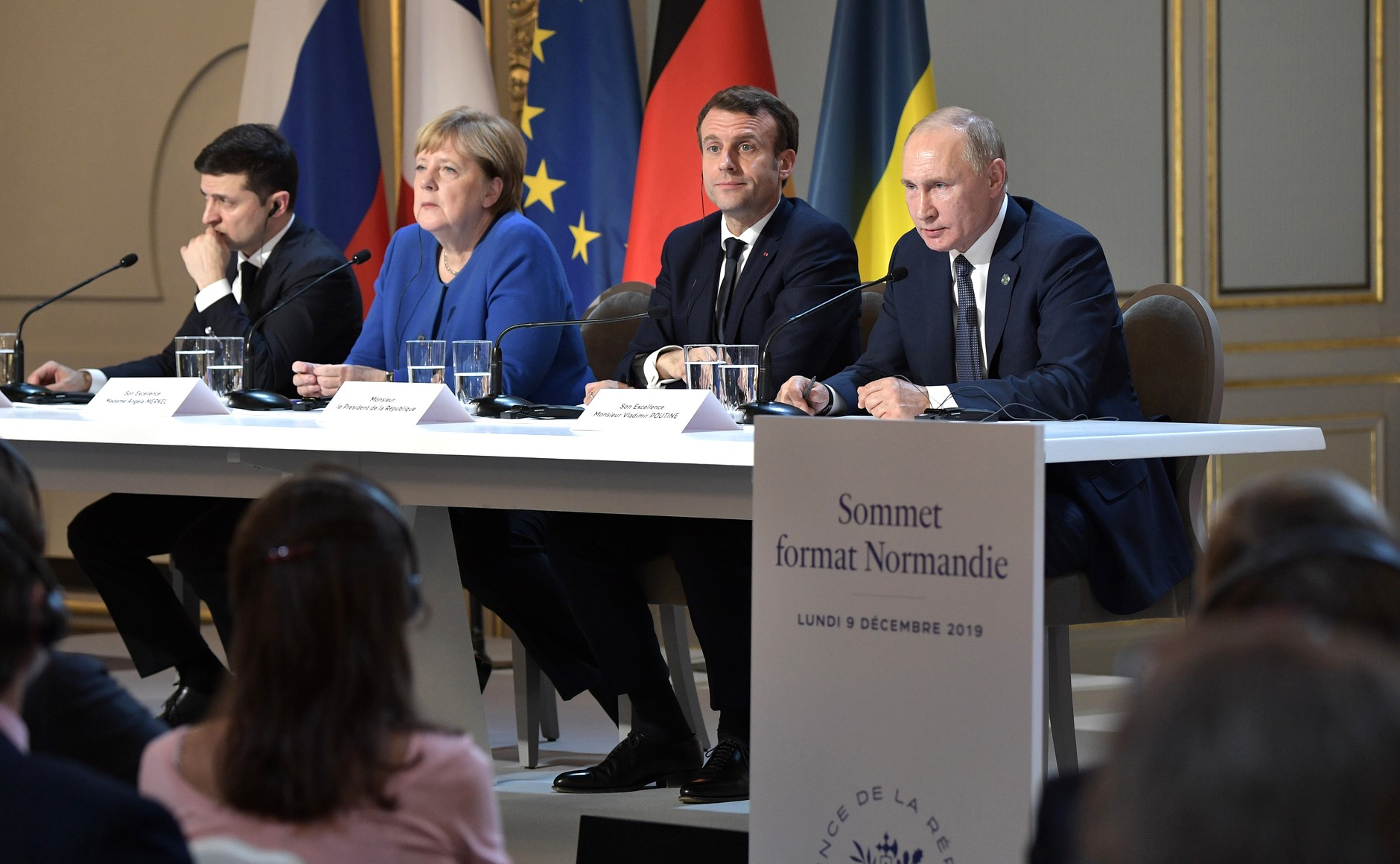
Ukrainian president Volodymyr Zelenskyy, German chancellor Angela Merkel, French president Emmanuel Macron, and Putin met in Paris on 9 December 2019 in the "Normandy Format" aimed at ending the war in Donbas.

In August 2008, Georgian President Mikheil Saakashvili attempted to restore control over the breakaway South Ossetia. However, the Georgian military was soon defeated in the resulting 2008 South Ossetia War after regular Russian forces entered South Ossetia and then other parts of Georgia, also opening a second front in the other Georgian breakaway province of Abkhazia with Abkhazian forces.

Despite existing or past tensions between Russia and most of the post-Soviet states, Putin has followed the policy of Eurasian integration. Putin endorsed the idea of a Eurasian Union in 2011; the concept was proposed by the president of Kazakhstan in 1994. On 18 November 2011, the presidents of Belarus, Kazakhstan, and Russia signed an agreement setting a target of establishing the Eurasian Union by 2015. The Eurasian Union was established on 1 January 2015.

Under Putin, Russia's relations have improved significantly with Uzbekistan, the second-largest post-Soviet republic after Ukraine. This was demonstrated in Putin's visit to Tashkent in May 2000, after lukewarm relations under Yeltsin and Islam Karimov, who had long distanced itself from Moscow. In another meeting in 2014, Russia agreed to write off Uzbek debt. A theme of a greater Soviet region, including the former USSR and many of its neighbors or imperial-era states—rather than just post-Soviet Russia—has been consistent in Putin's May Day speeches.

=== United States, the West, and NATO ===
Under Putin, Russia's relationships with NATO and the U.S. have passed through several stages. When he first became president, relations were cautious, but after the 9/11 attacks, Putin quickly supported the U.S. in the war on terror, and the opportunity for partnership appeared. According to Russian studies scholar Stephen F. Cohen, the U.S. "repaid ... by further expanding NATO to Russia's borders and by unilaterally withdrawing from the 1972 Anti-Ballistic Missile Treaty", but others pointed out the applications from new countries willing to join NATO was driven primarily by Russian behavior in Chechnya, Transnistria, Abkhazia, the 1991 Soviet coup attempt, as well as calls to restore USSR in its previous borders by prominent Russian politicians.

From 2003, when Russia strongly opposed the U.S. when it waged the Iraq War, Putin became ever more distant from the West, and relations steadily deteriorated. According to Cohen, the narrative of the mainstream U.S. media, following that of the White House, became anti-Putin. In an interview with Michael Stürmer, Putin said there were three questions which most concerned Russia and Eastern Europe: namely, the status of Kosovo, the Treaty on Conventional Armed Forces in Europe and American plans to build missile defence sites in Poland and the Czech Republic, and suggested that all three were linked. His view was that concessions by the West on one of the questions might be met with concessions from Russia on another.

In 2003, relations between Russia and the United Kingdom deteriorated when the United Kingdom granted political asylum to Putin's former patron, oligarch Boris Berezovsky. This deterioration was intensified by allegations that the British were spying and making secret payments to pro-democracy and human rights groups. The end of 2006 brought more strained relations in the wake of the death by polonium poisoning in London of former KGB and FSB officer Alexander Litvinenko, who became an MI6 agent in 2003. In 2007, the crisis in relations continued with the expulsion of four Russian envoys over Russia's refusal to extradite former KGB bodyguard Andrei Lugovoi to face charges over the murder. Mirroring the British actions, Russia expelled UK diplomats and took other retaliatory steps. In 2015, the British Government launched a public inquiry into Litvinenko's death, presided over by Robert Owen, a former British High Court judge. The Owen report, published on 21 January 2016, stated, "The FSB operation to kill Mr. Litvinenko was probably approved by Mr Patrushev and also by President Putin". The report outlined some possible motives for the murder, including Litvinenko's public statements and books about the alleged involvement of the FSB in mass murder, and what was "undoubtedly a personal dimension to the antagonism" between Putin and Litvinenko.

One single center of power. One single center of force. One single center of decision-making. This is the world of one master, one sovereign. ... Primarily, the United States has overstepped its national borders, and in every area.

— Putin criticizing the United States in his Munich Speech, 2007

In a January 2007 interview, Putin said Russia was in favor of a democratic multipolar world and strengthening the systems of international law. In February 2007, Putin criticized what he called the United States' monopolistic dominance in global relations, and "almost uncontained hyper use of force in international relations". He said the result of it is that "no one feels safe! Because no one can feel that international law is like a stone wall that will protect them. Of course such a policy stimulates an arms race." This came to be known as the Munich Speech, and NATO secretary Jaap de Hoop Scheffer called the speech "disappointing and not helpful".

The months following Putin's Munich Speech were marked by tension and a surge in rhetoric on both sides of the Atlantic. Both Russian and American officials, however, denied the idea of a new Cold War. Putin publicly opposed plans for the U.S. missile shield in Europe and presented President George W. Bush with a counterproposal on 7 June 2007, which was declined. Russia suspended its participation in the Conventional Forces in Europe treaty on 11 December 2007.

Putin opposed Kosovo's unilateral declaration of independence from Serbia on 17 February 2008, warning that it would destabilize the whole system of international relations. He described the recognition of Kosovo's independence by several major world powers as "a terrible precedent, which will de facto blow apart the whole system of international relations, developed not over decades, but over centuries", and that "they have not thought through the results of what they are doing. At the end of the day it is a two-ended stick and the second end will come back and hit them in the face". In March 2014, Putin used Kosovo's declaration of independence as a justification for recognizing the independence of Crimea, citing the so-called "Kosovo independence precedent".

After the 9/11 attacks on the U.S. in 2001, Putin had good relations with the American President George W. Bush, and many Western European leaders. His "cooler" and "more business-like" relationship with German chancellor Angela Merkel is often attributed to Merkel's upbringing in the former DDR, where Putin was stationed as a KGB agent. He had a very friendly and warm relationship with Prime Minister of Italy Silvio Berlusconi; the two leaders often described their relationship as a close friendship, continuing to organize bilateral meetings even after Berlusconi's resignation in November 2011. When Berlusconi died in 2023, Putin described him as an "extraordinary man" and a "true friend".

The NATO-led military intervention in Libya in 2011 prompted a widespread wave of criticism from several world leaders, including Putin, who said that the United Nations Security Council Resolution 1973 is "defective and flawed", adding: "It allows everything. It resembles medieval calls for crusades".

In late 2013, Russian-American relations deteriorated further when the United States canceled a summit for the first time since 1960 after Putin gave asylum to the American Edward Snowden, who had leaked massive amounts of classified information from the NSA. In 2014, Russia was suspended from the G8 group as a result of its annexation of Crimea. Putin gave a speech highly critical of the United States, accusing them of destabilizing world order and trying to "reshape the world" to its own benefit. In June 2015, Putin said that Russia has no intention of attacking NATO.

On 9 November 2016, Putin congratulated Donald Trump on becoming the 45th president of the United States. In December 2016, US intelligence officials (headed by James Clapper) quoted by CBS News stated that Putin approved the email hacking and cyber attacks during the U.S. election, against the Democratic presidential nominee, Hillary Clinton. A spokesman for Putin denied the reports. Putin has repeatedly accused Hillary Clinton, who served as U.S. secretary of state from 2009 to 2013, of interfering in Russia's internal affairs, and in December 2016, Clinton accused Putin of having a personal grudge against her. Putin stated that U.S.–Russian relations, already at the lowest level since the end of the Cold War, continued to deteriorate after Trump took office in January 2017.

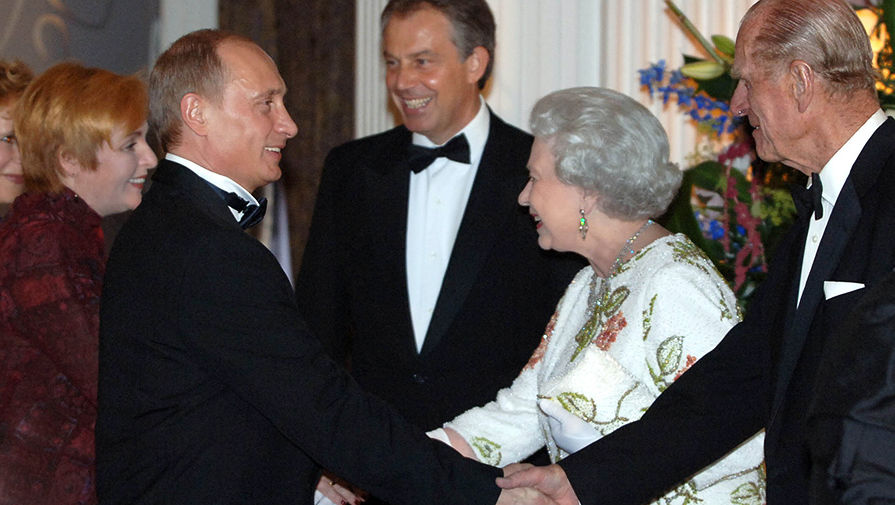
Putin and his wife Lyudmila meeting with Queen Elizabeth II, her husband Prince Philip, Duke of Edinburgh, and Prime Minister Tony Blair in 2005

On 4 March 2018, former double agent Sergei Skripal was poisoned with a Novichok nerve agent in Salisbury. Ten days later, the British government formally accused the Russian state of attempted murder, a charge which Russia denied. After the UK expelled 23 Russian diplomats (an action which would later be responded to with a Russian expulsion of 23 British diplomats), British Foreign Secretary Boris Johnson said on 16 March that it was "overwhelmingly likely" Putin had personally ordered the poisoning of Skripal. Putin's spokesman Dmitry Peskov called the allegation "shocking and unpardonable diplomatic misconduct".

On 18 June 2020, The National Interest published a nine-thousand-word essay by Putin, titled "The Real Lessons of the 75th Anniversary of World War II". In the essay, Putin criticizes the Western historical view of the Molotov–Ribbentrop Pact as the start of World War II, stating that the Munich Agreement was the beginning.

On 21 February 2023, Putin suspended Russia's participation in the New START nuclear arms reduction treaty with the United States. On 25 March, President Putin announced the stationing of tactical nuclear weapons in Belarus. Russia would maintain control of the weapons. President Putin told Russian TV: "There is nothing unusual here either. Firstly, the United States has been doing this for decades. They have long deployed their tactical nuclear weapons on the territory of their allied countries."

In August 2024, Putin pardoned American journalist Evan Gershkovich, opposition figures Vladimir Kara-Murza, Ilya Yashin, and others in a prisoner swap with Western countries. The 2024 Ankara prisoner exchange was the most extensive between Russia and United States since the end of the Cold War, involving the release of 26 people. On 22 June 2025, Putin condemned the U.S. strikes on Iranian nuclear sites as an "unprovoked act of aggression."

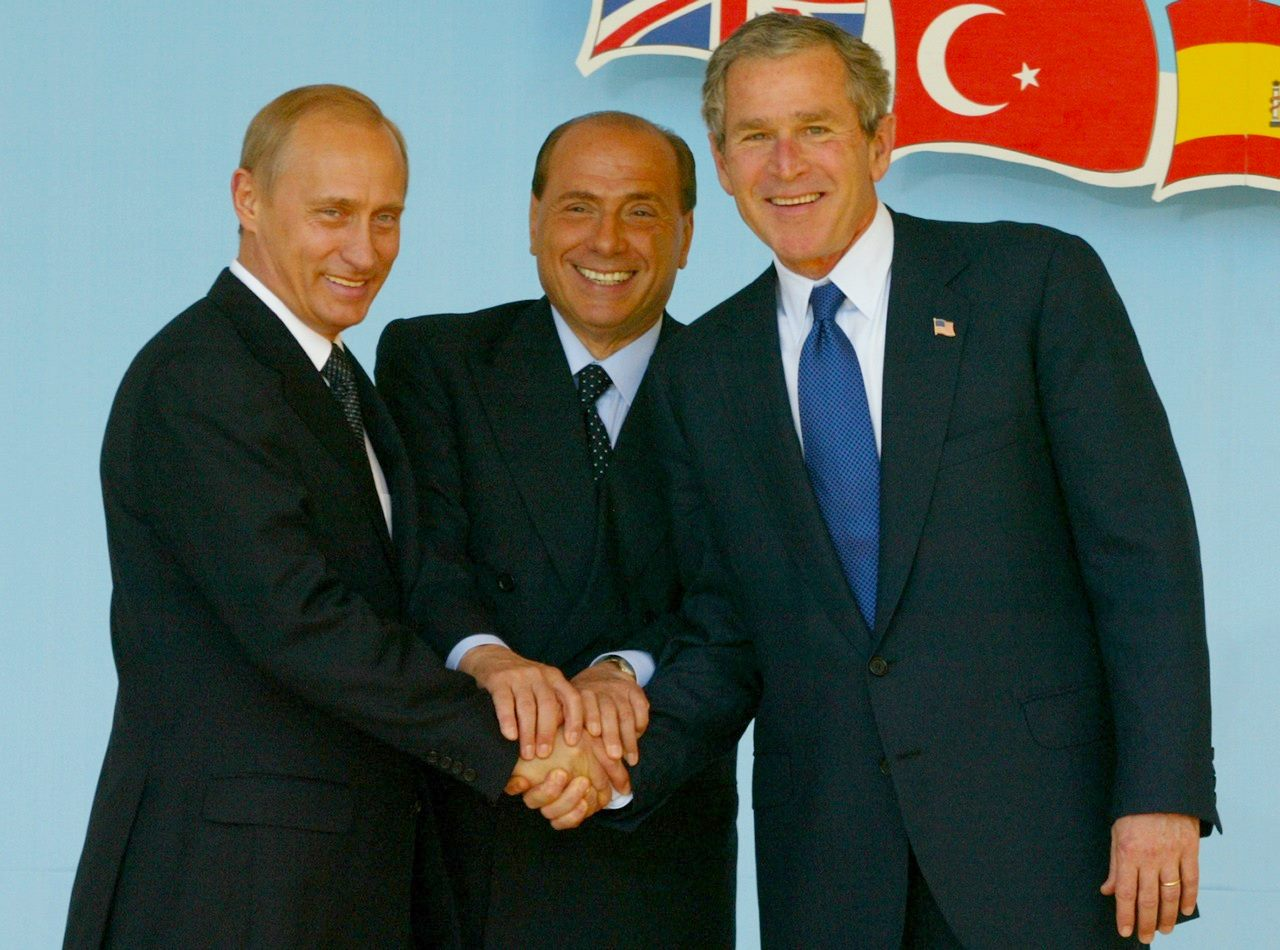
Putin with Italian prime minister Silvio Berlusconi and U.S. president George W. Bush at the NATO-Russia Council meeting in Rome on 28 May 2002

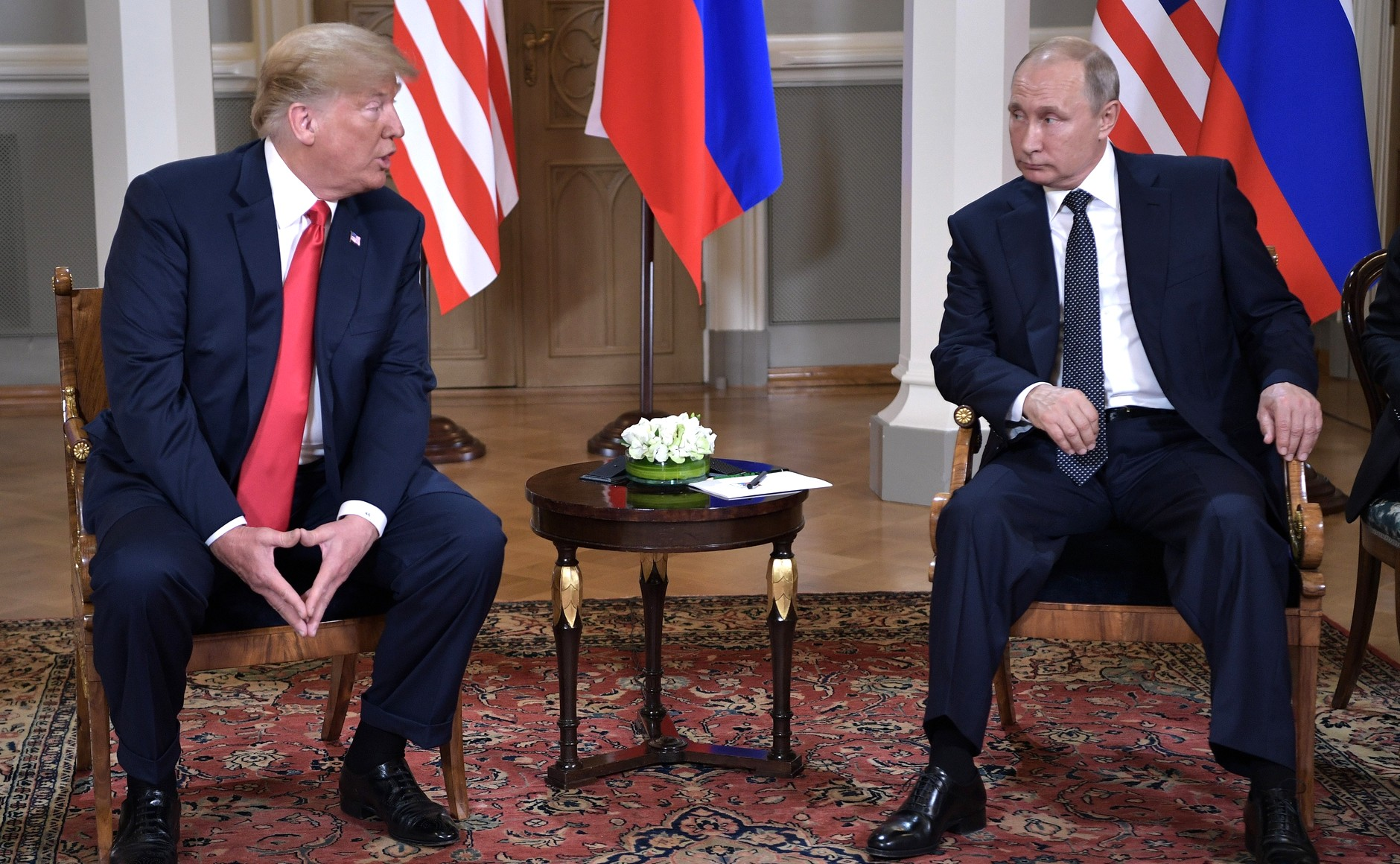
Putin with U.S. president Donald Trump at a summit meeting in Helsinki, Finland, 16 July 2018

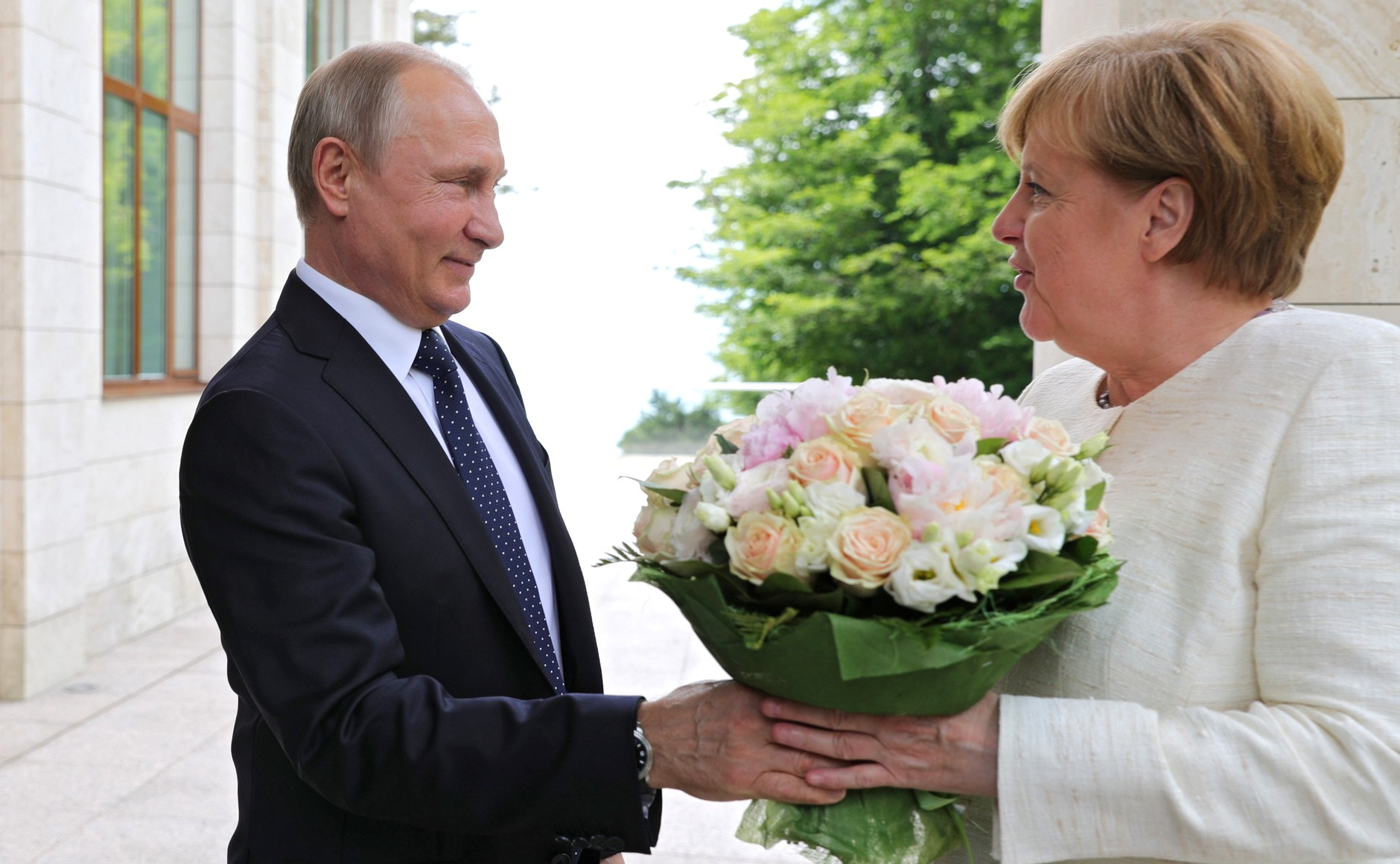
Putin held a meeting in Sochi with German chancellor Angela Merkel to discuss the Nord Stream 2 natural gas pipeline in May 2018.

=== Latin America ===
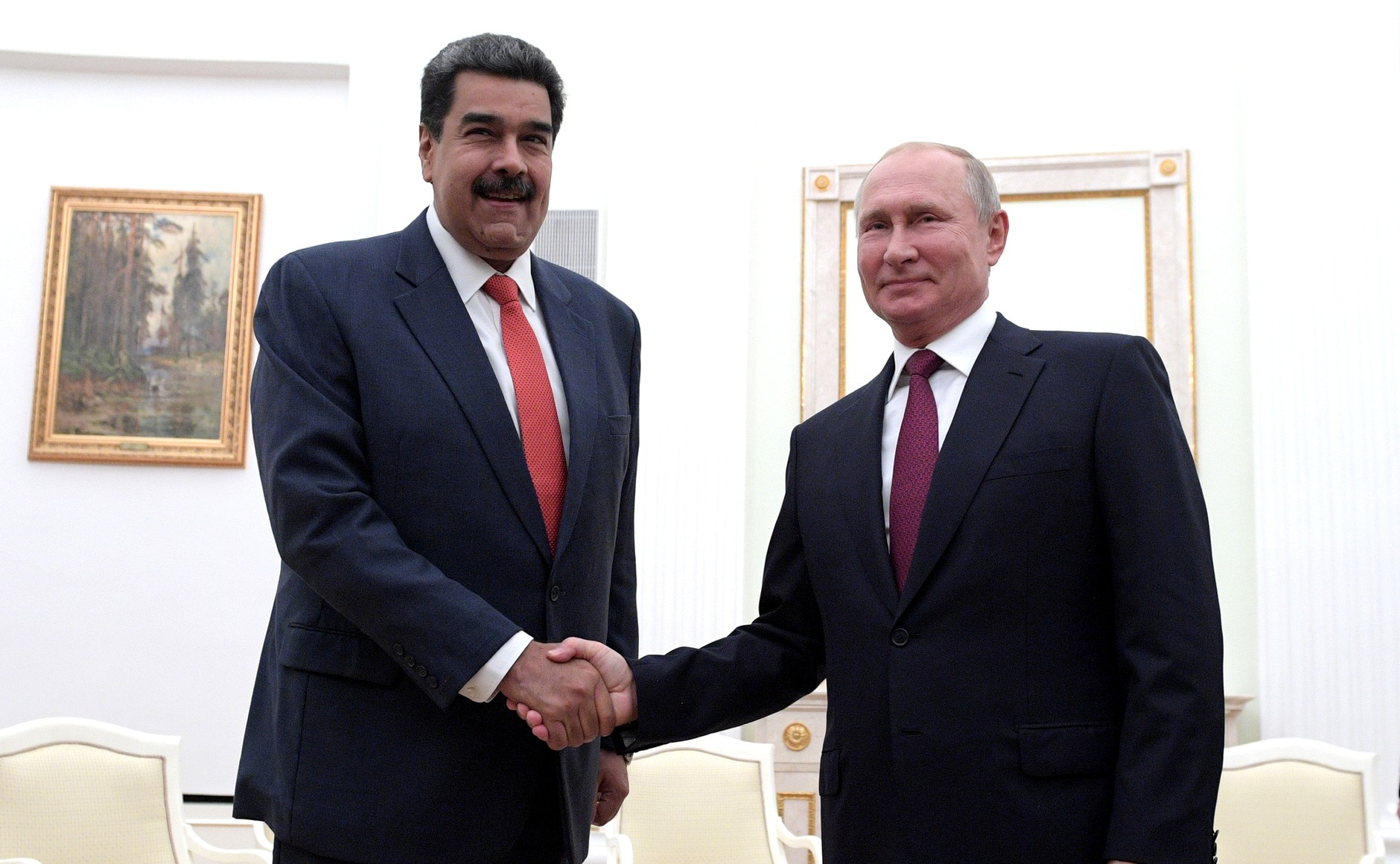
Putin and Venezuelan President Nicolás Maduro on 10 October 2019

Putin and his successor, Medvedev, enjoyed warm relations with Hugo Chávez of Venezuela. Much of this has been through the sale of military equipment; since 2005, Venezuela has purchased more than $4 billion worth of arms from Russia. In September 2008, Russia sent Tupolev Tu-160 bombers to Venezuela to carry out training flights. In November 2008, both countries held a joint naval exercise in the Caribbean. Earlier in 2000, Putin had re-established stronger ties with Fidel Castro's Cuba.

"You express the best masculine qualities", Putin told Jair Bolsonaro in 2020. "You look for solutions in all matters, always putting above all the interests of your people, your country, leaving out your own personal issues". Political scientist Oliver Stuenkel noted, "Among Brazil's right-wing populists, Putin is seen as someone who is anti-woke, and that is seen as something that is definitely appealing to Bolsonaro. He is a strongman, and that is very inspiring to Bolsonaro. He would like to be someone who concentrates as much power".

=== Middle East and Africa ===
On 16 October 2007, Putin visited Iran to participate in the Second Caspian Summit in Tehran, where he met with Iranian president Mahmoud Ahmadinejad. This was the first visit of a Soviet or Russian leader to Iran since Joseph Stalin's participation in the Tehran Conference in 1943, and marked a significant event in Iran–Russia relations. At a press conference after the summit Putin said that "all our (Caspian) states have the right to develop their peaceful nuclear programmes without any restrictions". Putin was quoted as describing Iran as a "partner", although he expressed concerns over the Iranian nuclear programme.

In April 2008, Putin became the first Russian president to visit Libya. Putin condemned the 2011 foreign military intervention in Libya, referring to the UN resolution as "defective and flawed", and added, "It allows everything. It resembles medieval calls for crusades". Upon the death of Muammar Gaddafi, Putin called it as "planned murder" by the US, saying: "They showed to the whole world how he (Gaddafi) was killed", and "There was blood all over. Is that what they call a democracy?"

From 2000 to 2010, Russia sold around $1.5 billion worth of arms to Syria, making Damascus Russia's seventh-largest client. During the Syrian civil war, Russia threatened to veto any sanctions against the Syrian government, and continued to supply arms to its regime. Putin opposed any foreign intervention in the Syrian civil war. In June 2012, in Paris, he rejected the statement of French president François Hollande who called on Bashar al-Assad to step down. Putin echoed Assad's argument that anti-regime militants were responsible for much of the bloodshed. He also talked about previous NATO interventions and their results, and asked, "What is happening in Libya, in Iraq? Did they become safer? Where are they heading? Nobody has an answer".

On 11 September 2013, The New York Times published an op-ed by Putin urging caution against US intervention in Syria and criticizing American exceptionalism. Putin subsequently helped to arrange for the destruction of Syria's chemical weapons. In 2015, he took a stronger pro-Assad stance and mobilized military support for the regime. Some analysts have summarized Putin as being allied with Shias and Alawites in the Middle East. Putin ordered Russian intervention to support his ally, Assad, to undermine the U.S.-led international order. As a result, Russia increased its influence in the Eastern Mediterranean by strengthening its control over the Tartus Naval Base and becoming an operator of the Khmeimim Air Base.

In 2017, Putin dispatched Russian PMCs to back the Touadéra regime in the Central African Republic Civil War, gaining a permanent military presence in return. The first Russia-Africa Summit was held in October 2019 in Sochi, Russia, co-hosted by Putin and Egyptian president Abdel Fattah el-Sisi. The meeting was attended by 43 heads of state and government from African countries.

In October 2019, Putin visited the United Arab Emirates, where six agreements were struck with Abu Dhabi Crown Prince Mohammed bin Zayed. One of them included shared investments between Russian sovereign wealth fund and the Emirati investment fund Mubadala. The two nations signed deals worth over $1.3 billion in the energy, health, and advanced technology sectors. On 22 October 2021, Putin highlighted the "unique bond" between Russia and Israel during a meeting with Israeli prime minister Naftali Bennett.

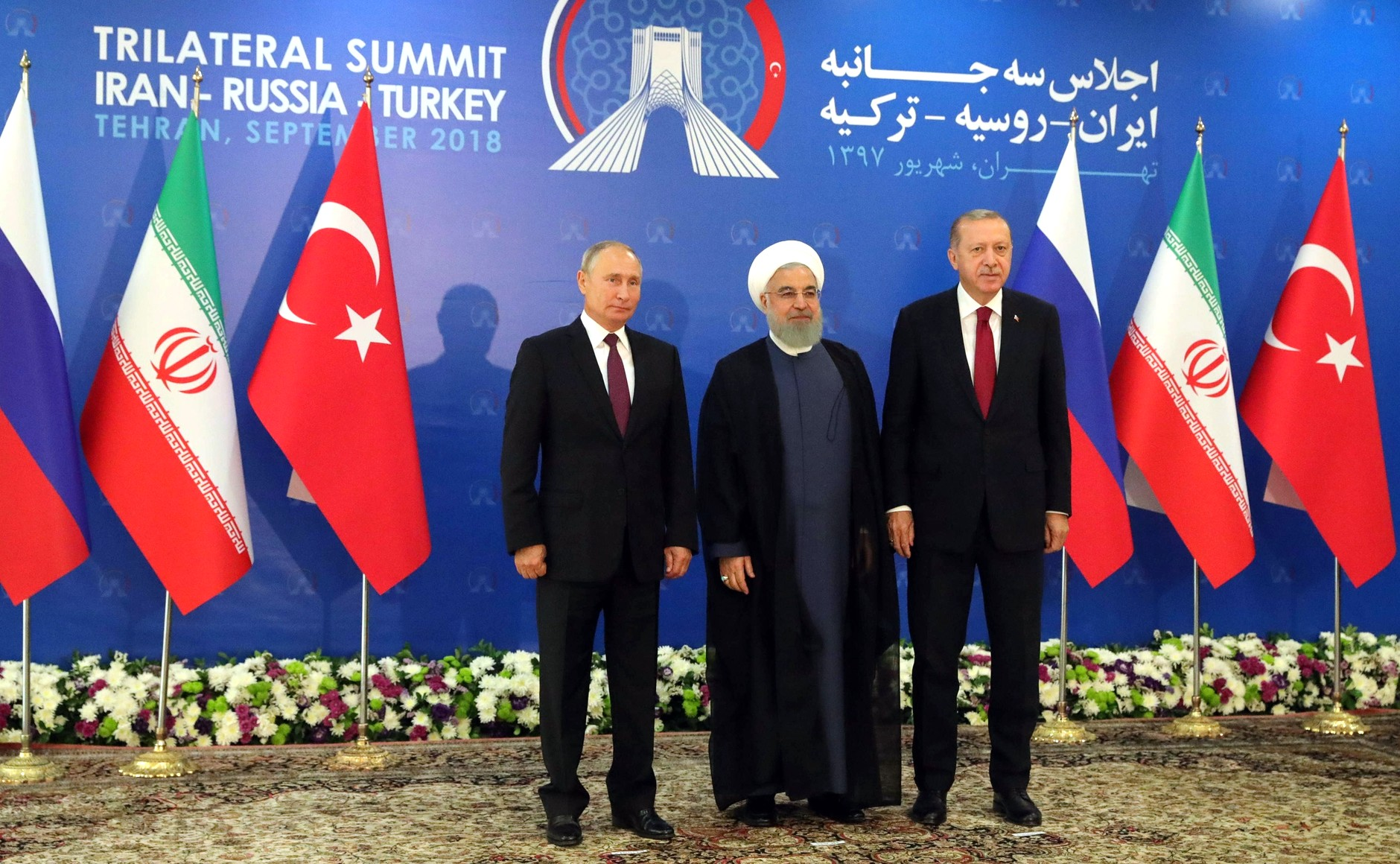
Putin with Iranian president Hassan Rouhani and Turkish president Recep Tayyip Erdoğan, September 2018

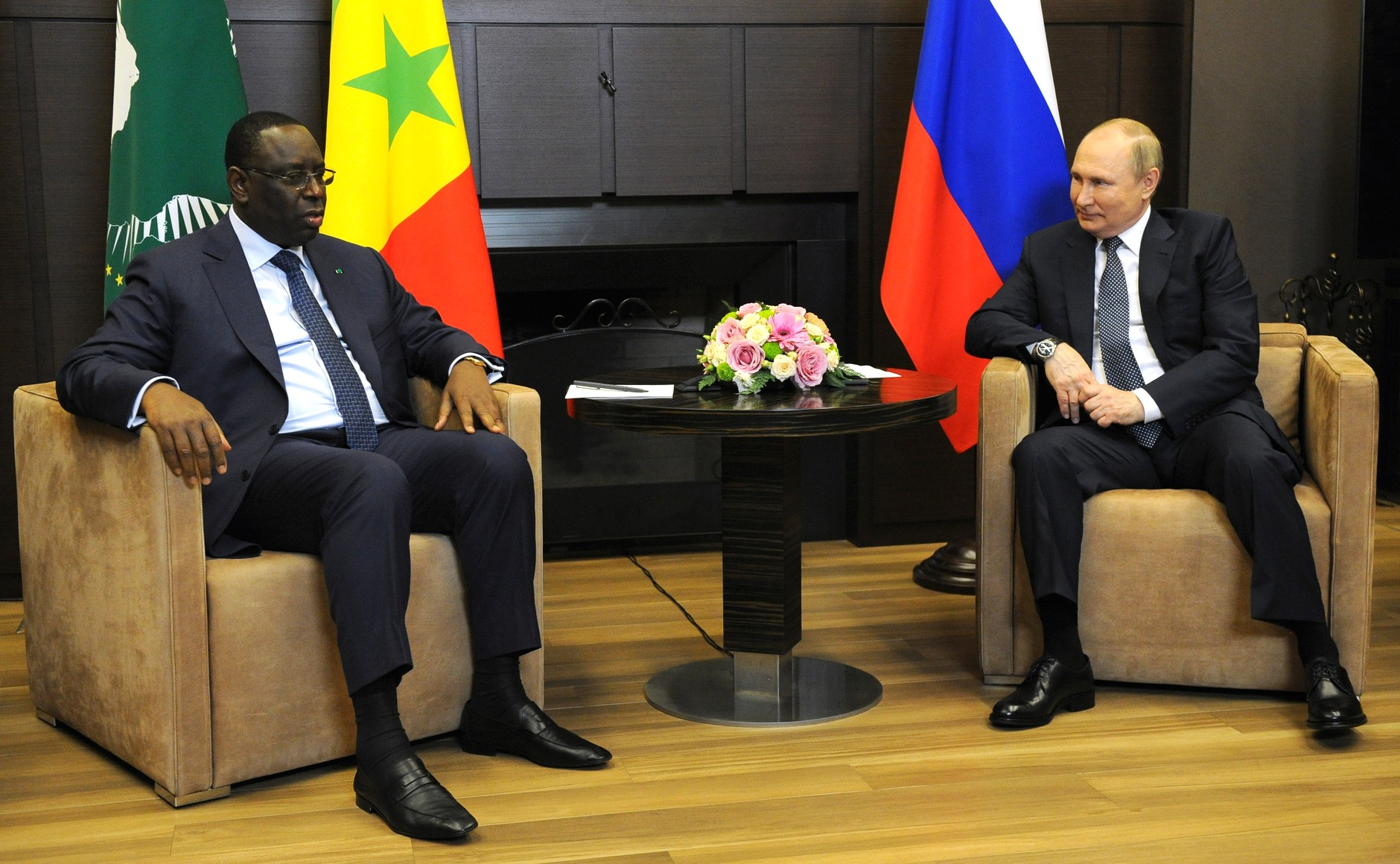
Putin met with the president of the African Union, Macky Sall, to discuss grain deliveries, June 2022. The war in Ukraine contributed to the 2022–2023 food crises.

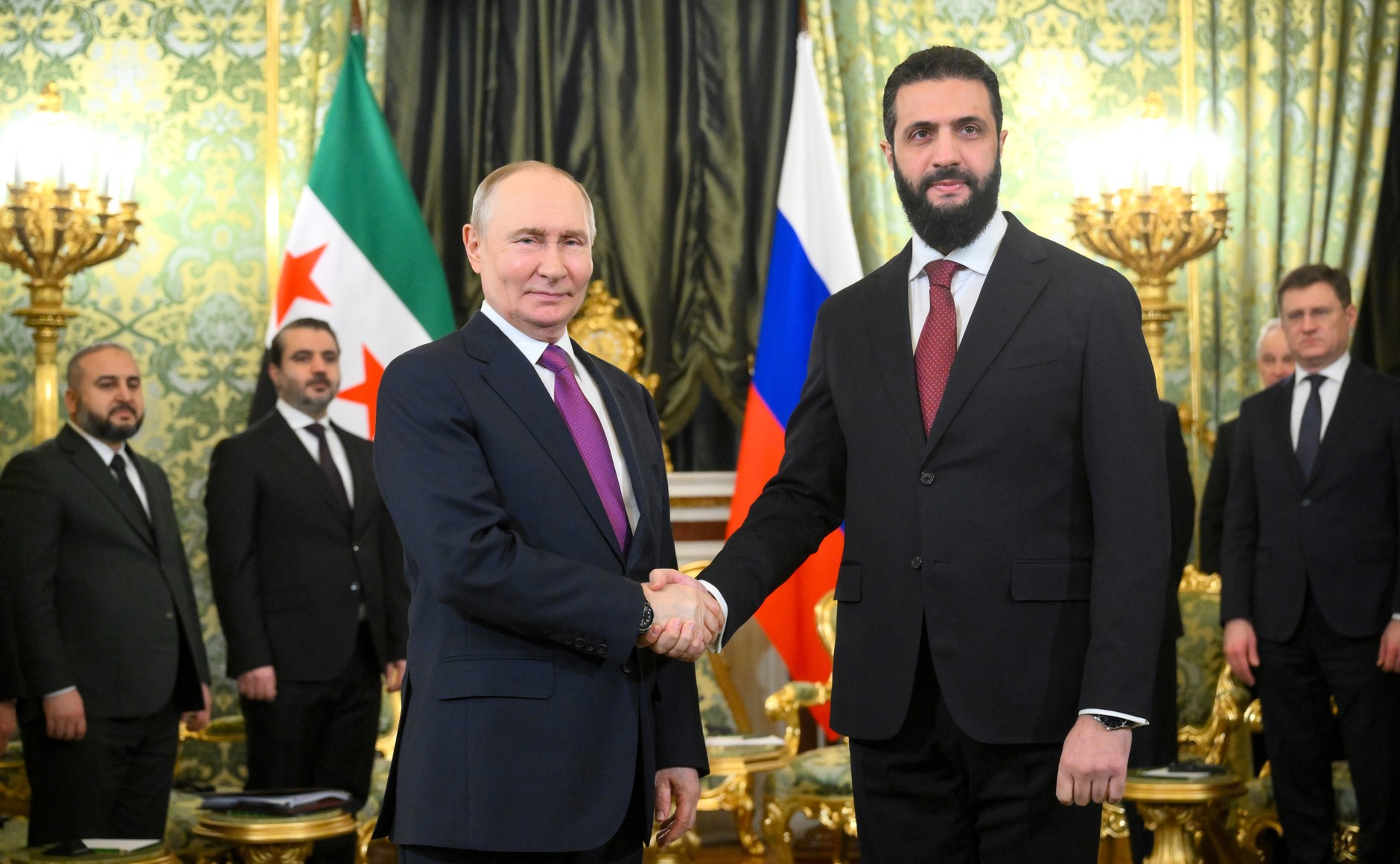
Putin with Syrian president Ahmed al-Sharaa, 28 January 2026

== Public image ==
=== Domestic opinion ===
In a June 2007 public opinion survey, Putin's approval rating was 81%, the second-highest of any leader in the world that year. In January 2013, at the time of the 2011–2013 Russian protests, Putin's rating fell to 62%, the lowest since 2000. In a context of increased diplomatic isolation and international sanctions on Russian officials prompted by the Russo-Ukrainian war, Putin's approval rating reached 87% in August 2014. In June 2015, Putin's approval rating climbed to 89%, an all-time high. Observers saw Putin's high approval ratings in 2010s as a consequence of improvements in living standards, and Russia's reassertion on the world scene during his presidency. The director of the Levada Center stated in 2015 that drawing conclusions from Russian poll results or comparing them to polls in democratic states was irrelevant, as there is no real political competition in Russia, where, unlike in democratic states, Russian voters are not offered any credible alternatives and public opinion is primarily formed by state-controlled media, which promotes those in power and discredits alternative candidates.

Putin's performance in reining in corruption is unpopular among Russians. Newsweek reported in 2017 that a poll "indicated that 67% held Putin personally responsible for high-level corruption". Corruption is a significant problem in Russia. In October 2018, two-thirds of Russians surveyed agreed that "Putin bears full responsibility for the problems of the country", which has been attributed to a decline in a popular belief in "good tsar and bad boyars", a traditional attitude towards justifying failures at the top of the ruling hierarchy in Russia. In January 2019, the percentage of Russians trusting Putin hit a then-historic low—33%. In May 2020, amid the COVID crisis, Putin's approval rating was 68%, when respondents were presented a list of names (closed question), and 27% when respondents were expected to name politicians they trust (open question). This has been attributed to continued post-Crimea economic stagnation but also an apathetic response to the pandemic crisis in Russia.

Following the Russian invasion of Ukraine in 2022, state-controlled TV, where most Russians get their news, presented the invasion as a "special military operation" and liberation mission, in line with the government's narrative. The Russian censorship apparatus Roskomnadzor ordered the country's media to employ information only from state sources or face fines and blocks. The Russian media was banned from using the words "war", "invasion" or "aggression" to describe the invasion, with media outlets being blocked as a result. In March 2022, 97% of Ukrainians said they had an unfavorable view of Putin, and 98% of Ukrainians—including 82% of ethnic Russians living in Ukraine—said they did not believe any part of Ukraine was rightfully part of Russia.

In late February 2022, a survey conducted by the independent research group Russian Field found that 59% of respondents supported the "special military operation" in Ukraine. In late February and mid-March 2022 two polls surveyed Russians' sentiments about the "special military operation" in Ukraine. The results were obtained by Radio Liberty. 71% of Russians polled said that they supported the "special military operation" in Ukraine. A poll published on 30 March in Russia saw Putin's approval rating jump, from 71% in February, to 83%. However, experts warned that the figures may not accurately reflect the public mood, as the public tends to rally around leaders during war and some may be hiding their true opinions, especially with the Russian 2022 war censorship laws prohibiting dissemination of "fake information" about the military. Many respondents do not want to answer pollsters' questions for fear of negative consequences. When researchers commissioned a survey on Russians' attitudes to the war, 29,400 out of 31,000 refused to answer. The Levada Center's director stated that early feelings of "shock and confusion" were being replaced with the belief that Russia was being besieged and that Russians must rally around their leader. The Kremlin's analysis concluded that public support for the war was broad but not deep, and that most Russians would accept anything Putin labeled a victory. In September 2023, the head of the VTsIOM state pollster Valery Fyodorov said in an interview that only 10–15% of Russians actively supported the war, and that "most Russians are not demanding the conquest of Kyiv or Odesa".

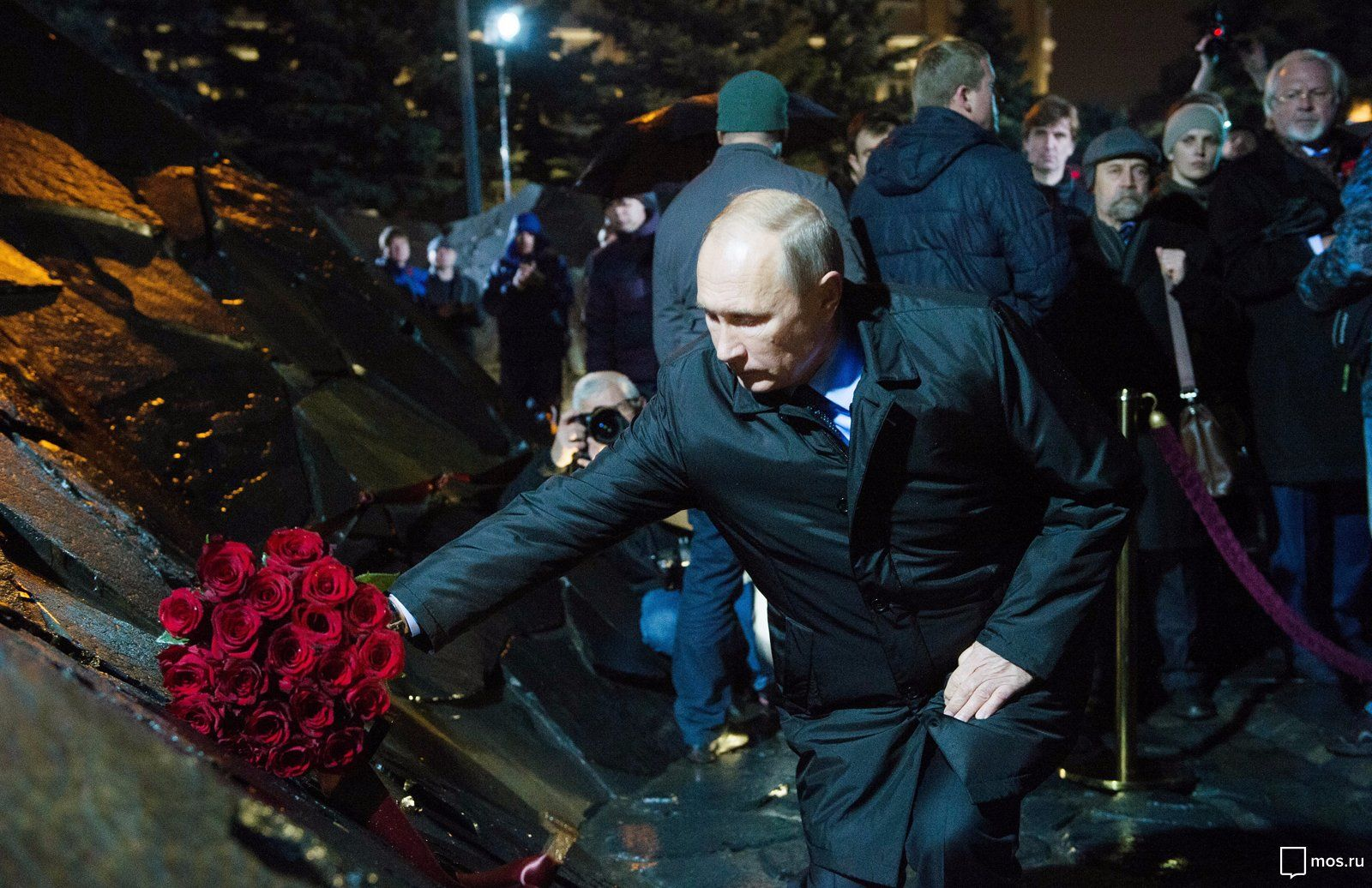
Putin opens the Wall of Grief, a monument to victims of Stalinist repression, October 2017

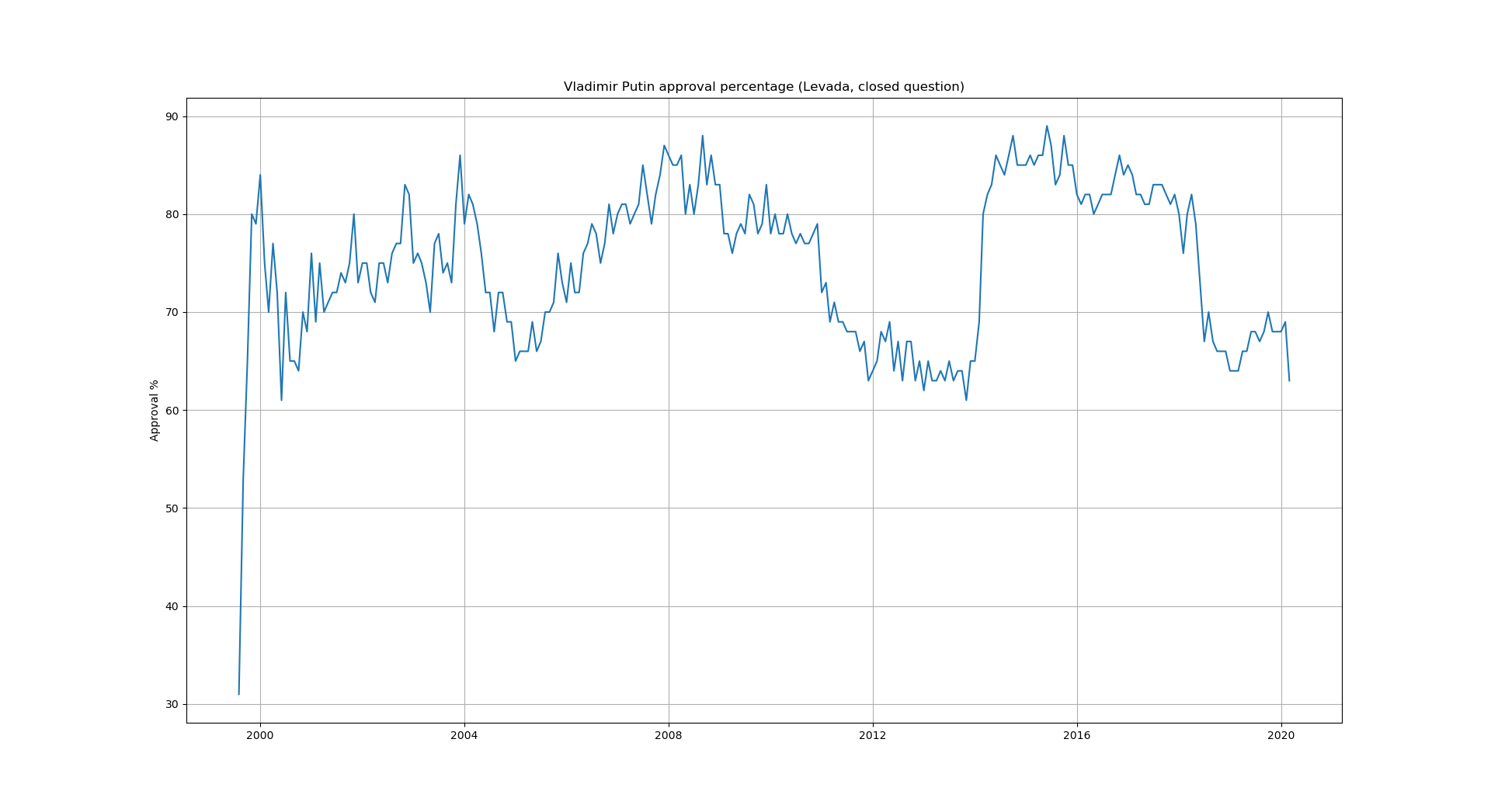
Vladimir Putin's public approval 1999–2020 (Levada, 2020)

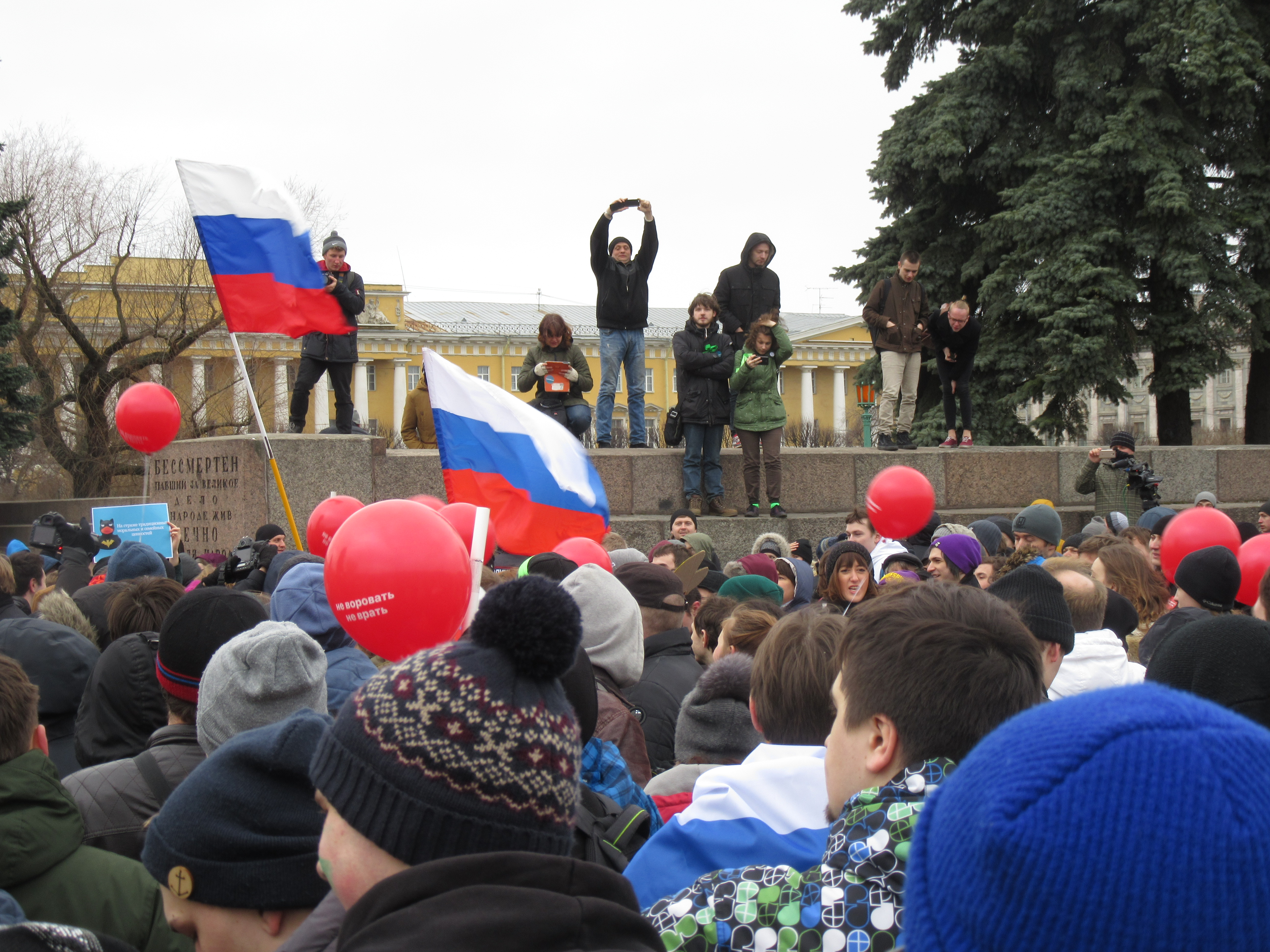
The Levada Center survey showed that 58% of surveyed Russians supported the 2017 Russian protests against high-level corruption.

=== International opinion ===
Global views of Russia's leadership in 2022. Net approval in blue, net disapproval in red.

Once popular in many regions outside Europe and North America, Putin's international reputation has fallen significantly since the invasion of Ukraine in 2022. Since 2008, approval for Russia's leadership has fallen in neighbouring countries of the former Soviet Union, particularly in 2014 and 2022. According to Gallup International Association (GIA) polling, Putin's global average net favorability was +3 in 2017 and fell to -41 by 2025. In 2022, Pew Research Center found that approval for Putin had declined to record lows in many countries following the invasion.

According to polling by Gallup, (Note: Gallup, Inc. is an American company with no direct connection to Gallup International Association, an association of polling organizations based Switzerland. Both are named after George Gallup.) median net approval for Russia's leadership was -1 in 2008, declined to -14 by 2014, recovered to -5 by 2021, and fell dramatically to -36 in 2022. With 57% median disapproval across 137 countries (Note: Afghanistan, Albania, Algeria, Argentina, Armenia, Australia, Austria, Azerbaijan, Bangladesh, Belgium, Benin, Bolivia, Bosnia and Herzegovina, Botswana, Brazil, Bulgaria, Cambodia, Cameroon, Canada, Chad, Chile, Colombia, Comoros, Congo, Democratic Republic of the Congo, Costa Rica, Ivory Coast, Croatia, Cyprus, Czech Republic, Denmark, Dominican Republic, Ecuador, El Salvador, Estonia, Eswatini, Ethiopia, Finland, France, Gabon, Gambia, Georgia, Germany, Ghana, Greece, Guatemala, Guinea, Honduras, Hong Kong, Hungary, Iceland, India, Indonesia, Iran, Iraq, Ireland, Israel, Italy, Jamaica, Japan, Jordan, Kazakhstan, Kenya, Kosovo, Kuwait, Kyrgyzstan, Laos, Latvia, Lebanon, Lesotho, Liberia, Libya, Lithuania, Luxembourg, Madagascar, Malawi, Malaysia, Mali, Malta, Mauritania, Mauritius, Mexico, Moldova, Mongolia, Montenegro, Morocco, Mozambique, Myanmar, Namibia, Nepal, Netherlands, New Zealand, Nicaragua, Niger, Nigeria, North Macedonia, Northern Cyprus, Norway, Pakistan, Palestine, Panama, Paraguay, Peru, Philippines, Poland, Portugal, Puerto Rico, Romania, Senegal, Serbia, Sierra Leone, Singapore, Slovakia, Slovenia, South Africa, South Korea, Spain, Sri Lanka, Sweden, Switzerland, Taiwan, Tanzania, Thailand, Togo, Tunisia, Turkey, Uganda, Ukraine, United Kingdom, United States, Uruguay, Uzbekistan, Venezuela, Vietnam, Yemen, Zambia and Zimbabwe) in 2022, net approval was -78 in Europe, (Note: Excluding Ukraine, Belarus, Moldova and the Caucasus.) -22 in post-Soviet Eurasia, -27 in the Middle East and North Africa, +3 in Sub-Saharan Africa, -23 in the Asia-Pacific, and -45 in Latin America and the Caribbean.

A GIA survey of 58 countries (Note: Austria, Belgium, Bosnia and Herzegovina, Bulgaria, Croatia, Czech Republic, Denmark, Estonia, Finland, France, Germany, Greece, Hungary, Ireland, Italy, Kosovo, Latvia, Lithuania, Moldova, Netherlands, North Macedonia, Norway, Poland, Portugal, Romania, Serbia, Slovakia, Slovenia, Spain, Sweden, Switzerland, Ukraine, United Kingdom, Armenia, Australia, Azerbaijan, Georgia, India, Indonesia, Iran, Iraq, Japan, Malaysia, Pakistan, Philippines, South Korea, Syria, Thailand, Turkey, Ghana, Kenya, South Africa, Mexico, United States, Argentina, Colombia, Ecuador and Peru) found that average opinion of Putin was 66% unfavorable and 25% favorable in 2025. Net average favourability fell from +3 in 2017 (43% versus 40%) to -13 in 2018 (35% versus 48%) and -41 in 2025, falling in 38 out of the 45 countries surveyed by WIN/GIA since 2007. Previously positive in most regions outside Europe and North America, net opinion in 2025 was negative in all regions outside South Asia. Since 2017, opinion of Putin fell in Serbia (by 31 points), India (by 19) and Iran (by 56), with the largest falls in Croatia, Greece, Moldova and Armenia (by 75 to 84 points).

Median approval of Russia's leadership among 25 nearby and neighbouring countries since 2008

Approval for Russia's leadership has gradually fallen in neighbouring and nearby countries since 2008. In 2025, Gallup found that median approval was 22% across 25 countries (Note: Lithuania, Latvia, Estonia, Albania, Poland, Azerbaijan, Croatia, Czech Republic, Kosovo, Georgia, Romania, Slovakia, Republic of Moldova, Greece, Bosnia and Herzegovina, Bulgaria, Hungary, Kazakhstan, North Macedonia, Montenegro, Armenia, Uzbekistan, Serbia, Kyrgyzstan and Tajikistan) in Eastern and Southern Europe, Central Asia and the Caucasus. Approval peaked at 45% in 2008, declining to 35% by 2013 and falling further to 25% in 2014 after the Russian annexation of Crimea. Approval recovered somewhat to 31% by 2021, before falling to an all-time low of 18% in 2023 after the 2022 invasion of Ukraine. In 2025, Gallup found approval of less than 25% in 14 out of the 25 countries, and majority approval in only four (Tajikistan, Kyrgyzstan, Serbia and Uzbekistan). The leadership of the European Union (EU) had higher approval than the Russian leadership in every EU member state surveyed, including in Hungary (42%, versus 29% for Russia) and Bulgaria (44%, versus 26% for Russia). Among the Russian diaspora in Kazakhstan, Estonia and Latvia, net approval was higher than for non-Russians, but had declined by 30 to 60 points as of 2023. Since 2007, net approval has fallen substantially in every Central Asian, Caucasian and Baltic country except Azerbaijan.

In 2023, Pew found that a median share of 87% across 24 countries (Note: France, Germany, Greece, Hungary, Italy, Netherlands, Poland, Spain, Sweden, United Kingdom, Australia, India, Indonesia, Israel, Japan, South Korea, Kenya, Nigeria, South Africa, Canada, Mexico, United States, Argentina and Brazil) did not have confidence in Putin to do the right thing in world affairs, versus 11% that did. In 2020, a median of 60% across 33 countries (Note: Canada, United States, Greece, Italy, Germany, France, United Kingdom, Netherlands, Spain, Sweden, Bulgaria, Slovakia, Czech Rep., Hungary, Lithuania, Poland, Ukraine, Philippines, India, Indonesia, Australia, Japan, South Korea, Tunisia, Lebanon, Israel, Turkey, Nigeria, Kenya, South Africa) did not have confidence in Putin, versus 30% that did. Between 2019 and 2023, confidence in Putin declined in 19 out of the 22 countries surveyed in both years, and was overwhelmingly negative in countries such as Mexico, Brazil, Japan and Australia, as well as in every European country surveyed, including Hungary, Germany, Italy and Poland. Net confidence was negative in 20 out of 24 countries, positive and improving only in Indonesia, Kenya and India, and positive but declining in Nigeria. In 2025, Pew found that confidence in Putin was higher among supporters of far-right or right-wing populist parties such as Alternative for Germany, Hungary's Fidesz and Greek Solution. In 2026, landslide election defeats for Viktor Orbán in Hungary and Aleksandar Vučić in Serbia were seen as losses of important allies for Putin.

=== Cult of personality ===
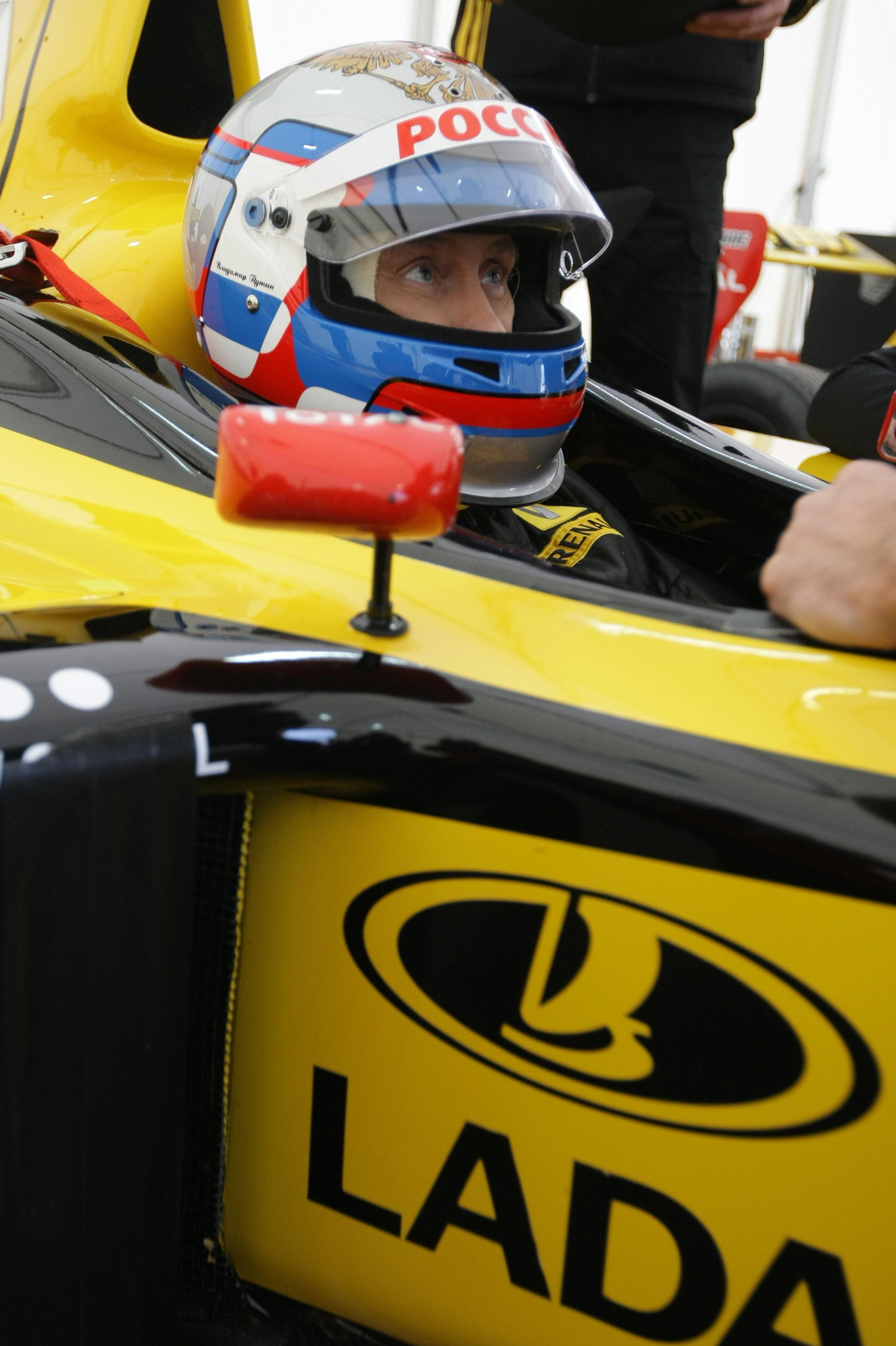
Putin driving a Formula One car, 2010 (video)

Putin has cultivated a cult of personality for himself with an outdoorsy, athletic, tough guy public image, demonstrating his physical prowess and taking part in unusual or dangerous acts, such as extreme sports and interaction with wild animals, part of a public relations approach that, according to Wired, "deliberately cultivates the macho, take-charge superhero image". In 2007, the tabloid Komsomolskaya Pravda published a huge photograph of a shirtless Putin vacationing in the Siberian mountains under the headline "Be Like Putin". Tatiana Mikhailova opines that virility is an aspect of the image of the Father of the Nation, which Putin wants to create. She refers to, as an example of the success of this image building attempt, a 2006 incident in which Putin lifted the shirt of a boy to kiss his stomach without permission – which did not cause much reaction in Russia even though, according to Mikhailova, it was unprecedented and transgressive by Russian standards and would have caused outrage in any other country (media reports note that there was widespread reaction in Russia and abroad, though).

Numerous Kremlinologists have accused Putin of seeking to create a cult of personality around himself, an accusation that the Kremlin has denied. Some of Putin's activities have been criticised for being staged; outside of Russia, his macho image has been the subject of parody. Putin's height has been estimated by Kremlin insiders to be between 155 and 165 centimetres (5 feet 1 inch and 5 feet 5 inches) tall but is usually given at 170 centimetres (5 feet 7 inches).

There are many songs about Putin, and Putin's name and image are widely used in advertisements and product branding. Among the Putin-branded products are Putinka vodka, the PuTin brand of canned food, the Gorbusha Putina caviar, and a collection of T-shirts with his image.

=== Putinisms ===
Putin has produced many aphorisms and catch-phrases known as putinisms. Many of them were first made during his annual Q&A conferences, where Putin answered questions from journalists and other people in the studio, as well as from Russians throughout the country, who either phoned in or spoke from studios and outdoor sites across Russia. Putin is known for his often tough and sharp language, often alluding to Russian jokes and folk sayings. Putin sometimes uses Russian criminal jargon (known as "fenya" in Russian), albeit not always correctly.

== Assessments ==
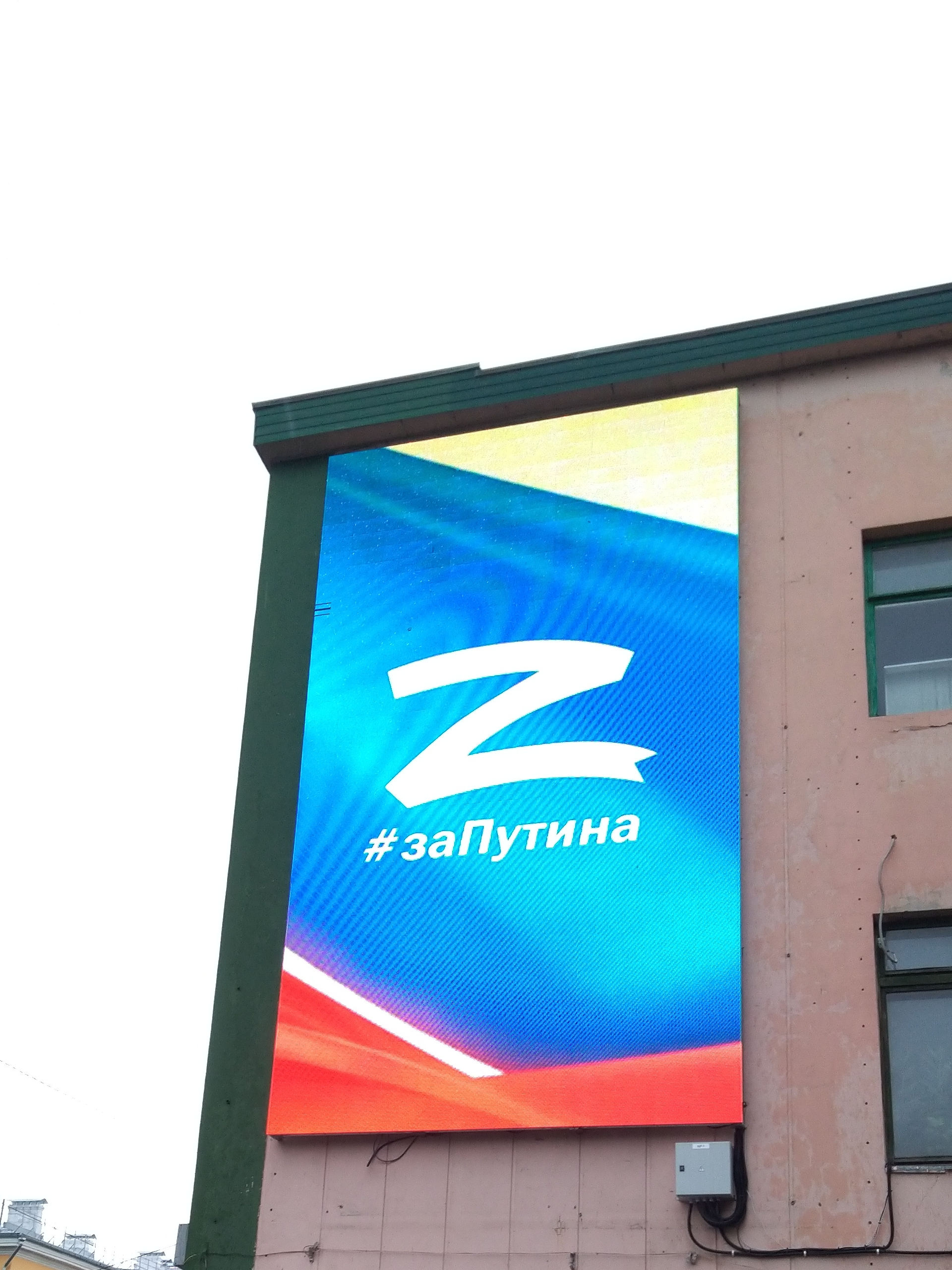
Z symbol on a billboard reads Russian: За Путина (lit. 'For Putin'), 24 September 2022

Assessments of Putin's character as a leader have evolved during his long presidency. His shifting of Russia towards autocracy and weakening of the system of representative government advocated by Boris Yeltsin has met with criticism. Russian dissidents and western leaders now frequently characterise him as a dictator. Others have offered favourable assessments of his impact on Russia.

Russia has suffered democratic backsliding during Putin's tenure. Freedom House has listed Russia as being "not free" since 2005. Experts do not generally consider Russia to be a democracy, citing purges and jailing of political opponents, curtailed press freedom, and the lack of free and fair elections. In 2004, Freedom House warned that Russia's "retreat from freedom marks a low point not registered since 1989, when the country was part of the Soviet Union".

In 2007, Putin was named Time Person of the Year, where he was described as "choosing order before freedom". From 2013 to 2016, Putin was No. 1 on the Forbes list of The World's Most Powerful People, and was No. 2 in 2018, the last year the list has been published.

The Economist Intelligence Unit has rated Russia as "authoritarian" since 2011, whereas it had previously been considered a "hybrid regime" (with "some form of democratic government" in place). According to political scientist Larry Diamond, writing in 2015, "no serious scholar would consider Russia today a democracy".

Following the jailing of the anti-corruption blogger and activist Alexei Navalny in 2018, Forbes wrote: "Putin's actions are those of a dictator... As a leader with failing public support, he can only remain in power by using force and repression that gets worse by the day". In November 2021, The Economist also noted that Putin had "shifted from autocracy to dictatorship".

Many Russians credit Putin for reviving Russia's fortunes. Chechen Republic head and Putin supporter, Ramzan Kadyrov, stated prior to 2011 that Putin saved both the Chechen people and Russia.

Putin was described in 2015 as a "dictator" by political opponent Garry Kasparov, and as the "Tsar of corruption" in 2016 by opposition activist and blogger Alexei Navalny. In 2015, opposition politician Boris Nemtsov said that Putin was turning Russia into a "raw materials colony" of China.

Former Soviet Union leader Mikhail Gorbachev, while acknowledging the flawed democratic procedures and restrictions on media freedom during the Putin presidency, said that Putin had pulled Russia out of chaos at the end of the Yeltsin years. In 2013, Gorbachev that Russian politics was "turning into an imitation of democracy", and that corruption "has taken on colossal proportions". In 2016, he said: "I am ashamed for [Putin and Medvedev]. They act in an indecent way. As if there was no society, as there was no constitution, no election system." Gorbachev was upset about the invasion of Ukraine in 2022, according to journalist Alexei Venediktov, a close friend of Gorbachev, and called for an end to hostilities in February 2022.

Otto von Habsburg, the last crown prince of Austria-Hungary and former Member of the European Parliament, was an early critic of Putin. In a newspaper interview in 2002 and in two speeches in 2003 and 2005, he warned of Putin as an "international threat", that he was "cruel and oppressive", and a "stone cold technocrat". He was described as a "bully" and "arrogant" by former U.S. secretary of state Hillary Clinton, and as "self-centered" by the Dalai Lama. Former U.S. secretary of state Henry Kissinger wrote in 2014 that the West had demonized Putin. In 2019, Egon Krenz, the last communist leader of East Germany, said the Cold War never ended, adding: "After weak presidents like Gorbachev and Yeltsin, it is a great fortune for Russia that it has Putin".

In German, the term Putinversteher (lit. 'Putin-understander') is a pejorative referring to politicians and commentators who express sympathy for Putin's actions. Formed from the verb verstehen ('to understand'), it can be translated as "Putin sympathizer" or "one who understands Putin".

In a 2015 opinion article for The Wall Street Journal, former U.S. ambassador to Germany John Kornblum disputed Putin's claim that Russia had been betrayed by the West after the Cold War. Kornblum argued that Western governments had not intended to humiliate Russia and had observed the agreements reached with Moscow in the early 1990s.

In her 2017 book Red Hangover: Legacies of Twentieth-Century Communism, Kristen Ghodsee argued that the triumphalist attitudes of Western powers at the end of the Cold War, and the fixation with linking all leftist and socialist political ideals with the horrors of Stalinism, allowed neoliberalism to fill the void, undermined democratic institutions and reforms, left a trail of economic misery, unemployment, hopelessness and rising inequality throughout the former Eastern Bloc. This includes Russia, helping fuel the rise of Putin's extremist right-wing nationalism.

=== After the 2022 invasion of Ukraine ===
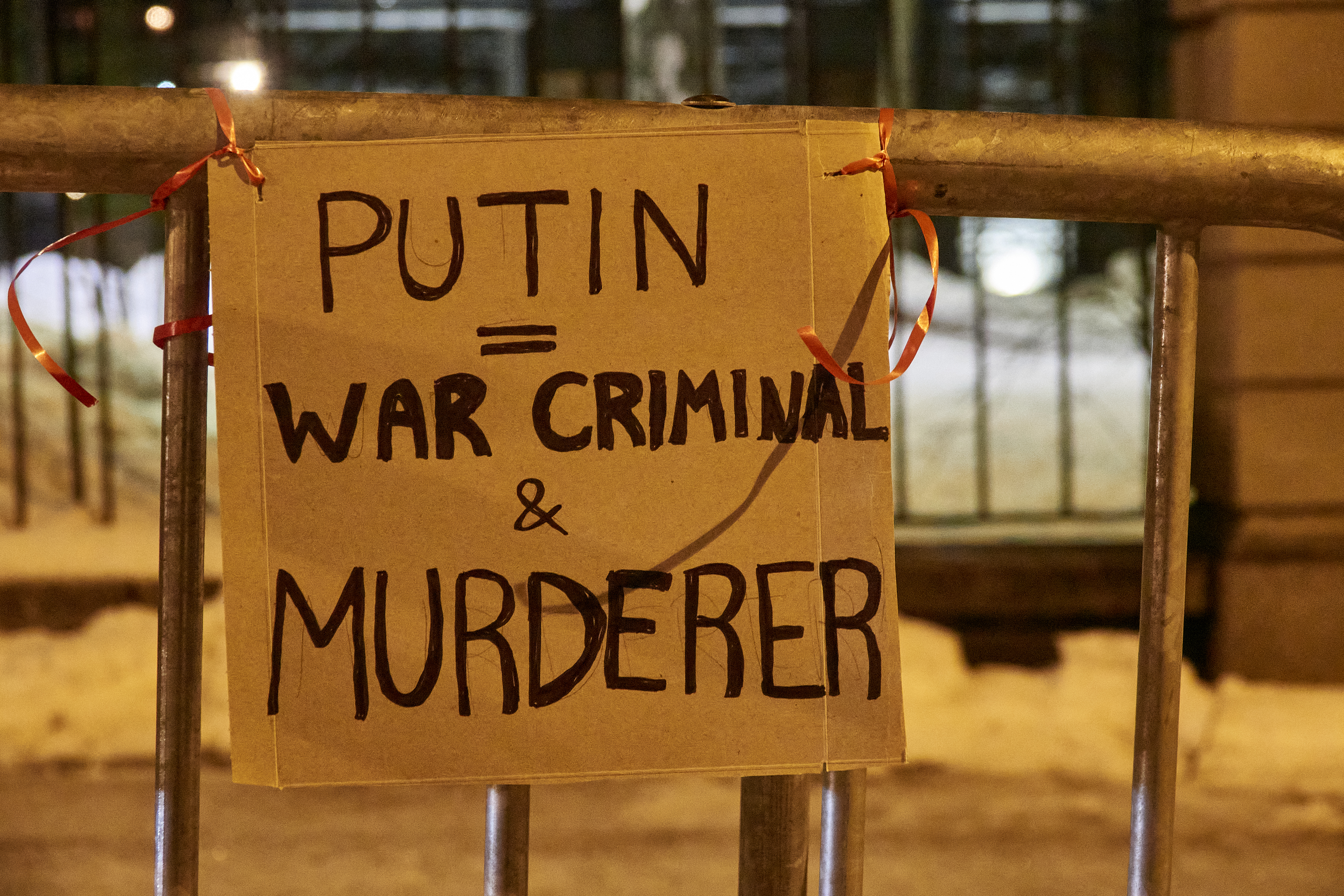
Protest sign in front of the Russian embassy in Finland. Putin has been labeled a war criminal by international law experts.

Following mounting civilian casualties during the Russian invasion of Ukraine, U.S. president Joe Biden called Putin a war criminal and "murderous dictator". In the 2022 State of the Union Address, Biden said that Putin had "badly miscalculated". The Ukrainian envoy to the United Nations, Sergiy Kyslytsya likened Putin to Adolf Hitler. Latvian prime minister Krisjanis Karins also likened the Russian leader to Hitler, saying he was "a deluded autocrat creating misery for millions" and that "Putin is fighting against democracy (...) If he can attack Ukraine, theoretically it could be any other European country".

Lithuania's foreign minister, Gabrielius Landsbergis, stated, "The battle for Ukraine is a battle for Europe. If Putin is not stopped there, he will go further." French President Emmanuel Macron said Putin was "deluding himself". French foreign minister Jean-Yves Le Drian denounced him as "a cynic and a dictator". Canadian Prime Minister Justin Trudeau called Putin "a lying, murderous dictator". UK Prime Minister Boris Johnson also labelled Putin a "dictator" who had authorised "a tidal wave of violence against a fellow Slavic people". Several authors and academics, such as Michael Hirsh, described Putin as a "messianic" Russian nationalist and Eurasianist.

In a March 2025 essay in The Atlantic, Franklin Foer argued that Putin's rule had had consequences beyond Russia, including for democratic development in neighboring states and for relations between Russia and the West.

== Electoral history ==
Vladimir Putin has been nominated and elected as President of Russia all five times since 2000, typically under an independent banner. In the most recent 2024 Russian presidential election, Putin achieved 88% of the popular vote. There were reports of irregularities at this election, including ballot stuffing and coercion. Russian authorities claimed that in occupied areas of Ukraine's Zaporizhzhia and Kherson regions, Putin won 88.12% and 92.83% of votes. In Chechnya, Putin won 98.99% of the vote.

== Personal life ==
=== Family ===
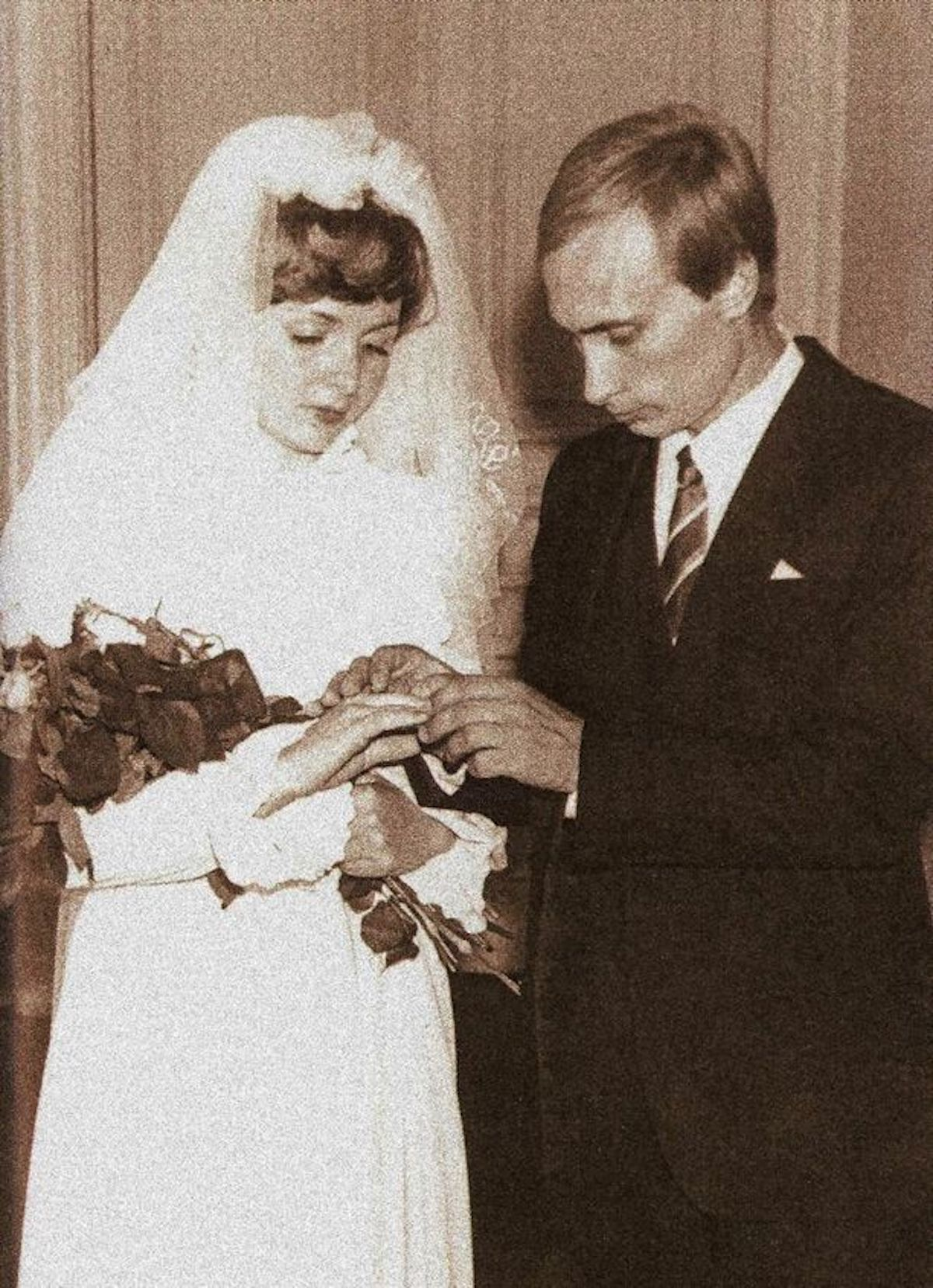
Putin and Lyudmila Putina during their wedding on 28 July 1983

On 28 July 1983, Putin married Lyudmila Shkrebneva, and they lived together in East Germany from 1985 to 1990. They have two daughters, Maria Putina, born on 28 April 1985 in Leningrad (now Saint Petersburg), and Yekaterina Putina, born on 31 August 1986 in Dresden, East Germany (now Germany).

An investigation by Proekt published in November 2020 alleged that Putin has another daughter, Elizaveta, also known as Luiza Rozova, (born in March 2003), with Svetlana Krivonogikh. Elizaveta studied in Paris under the name Elizaveta Olegovna Rudnova. In April 2008, the Moskovsky Korrespondent reported that Putin had divorced Lyudmila and was engaged to marry Olympic gold medalist Alina Kabaeva, a former rhythmic gymnast and Russian politician. The story was denied, and the newspaper was shut down shortly thereafter. Putin and Lyudmila continued to make public appearances together as spouses, while the status of his relationship with Kabaeva became a topic of speculation.

On 6 June 2013, Putin and Lyudmila announced that their marriage was over; on 1 April 2014, the Kremlin confirmed that the divorce had been finalised. Kabaeva reportedly gave birth to a daughter by Putin in 2015; this report was denied. Kabaeva reportedly gave birth to twin sons by Putin in 2019. However, in 2022, Swiss media, citing the couple's Swiss gynecologist, wrote that on both occasions Kabaeva gave birth to a boy.

Putin has two grandsons, born in 2012 and 2017, through Maria. He reportedly also has a granddaughter, born in 2017, through Katerina. His cousin, Igor Putin, was a director at Moscow-based Master Bank and was accused in a number of money-laundering scandals.

=== Wealth ===
Official figures released during the legislative election of 2007 put Putin's wealth at approximately 3.7 million rubles (US$280,000) in bank accounts, a private 77.4-square-meter (833 sq ft) apartment in Saint Petersburg, and miscellaneous other assets. Putin's reported 2006 income totaled 2 million rubles (approximately $152,000). In 2012, Putin reported an income of 3.6 million rubles ($270,000). Putin has been photographed wearing several expensive wristwatches, collectively valued at $700,000, nearly six times his annual salary. Putin has been known on occasion to give watches valued at thousands of dollars as gifts, for example a watch identified as a Blancpain to a Siberian boy he met while on vacation in 2009, and another similar watch to a factory worker the same year.

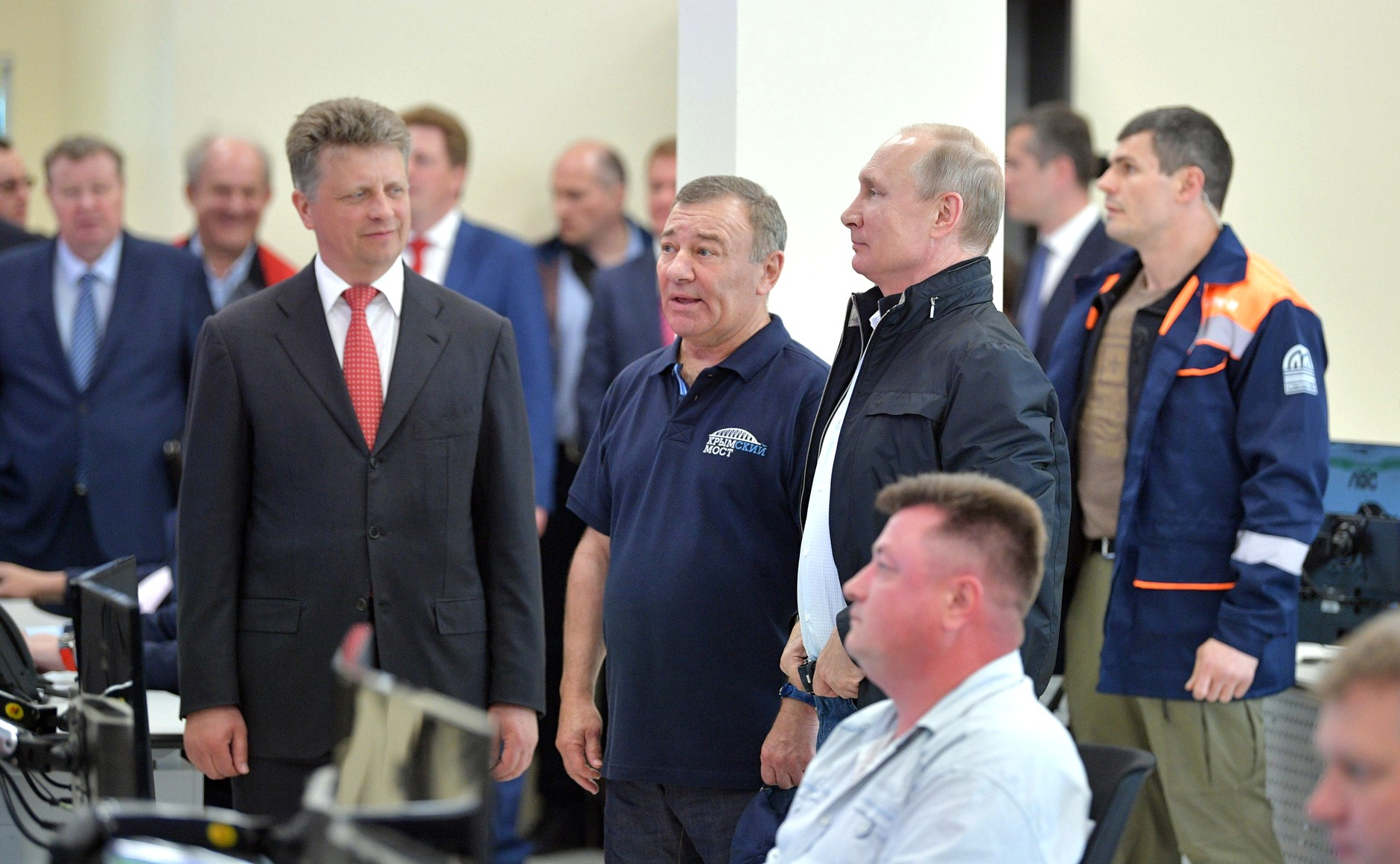
Putin's close associate Arkady Rotenberg mentioned in the Panama Papers, pictured in 2018

According to Russian opposition politicians and journalists, Putin secretly possesses a multi-billion-dollar fortune via successive ownership of stakes in several Russian companies. According to one editorial in The Washington Post, "Putin might not technically own these 43 aircraft, but, as the sole political power in Russia, he can act like they're his". An RIA Novosti journalist argued that "[Western] intelligence agencies ... could not find anything". These contradictory claims were analyzed by Polygraph.info, which looked at several reports by Western (Anders Åslund estimate of $100–160 billion) and Russian (Stanislav Belkovsky estimated of $40 billion) analysts, CIA (estimate of $40 billion in 2007) as well as counterarguments of Russian media. Polygraph concluded:

There is uncertainty on the precise sum of Putin's wealth, and the assessment by the Director of U.S. National Intelligence apparently is not yet complete. However, with the pile of evidence and documents in the Panama Papers and in the hands of independent investigators such as those cited by Dawisha, Polygraph.info finds that Danilov's claim that Western intelligence agencies have not been able to find evidence of Putin's wealth to be misleading

— Polygraph.info, "Are 'Putin's Billions' a Myth?"

In April 2016, 11 million documents belonging to Panamanian law firm Mossack Fonseca were leaked to the German newspaper Süddeutsche Zeitung and the Washington-based International Consortium of Investigative Journalists. The name of Putin does not appear in any of the records, and Putin denied his involvement with the company. However, various media have reported on three of Putin's associates on the list. According to the Panama Papers leak, close trusted associates of Putin own offshore companies worth US$2 billion in total. Süddeutsche Zeitung regards the possibility of Putin's family profiting from this money as plausible.

According to the paper, the US$2 billion had been "secretly shuffled through banks and shadow companies linked to Putin's associates", such as construction billionaires Arkady and Boris Rotenberg, and Bank Rossiya, previously identified by the U.S. State Department as being treated by Putin as his personal bank account, had been central in facilitating this. It concludes that "Putin has shown he is willing to take aggressive steps to maintain secrecy and protect [such] communal assets".

A significant proportion of the money trail leads to Putin's best friend Sergei Roldugin. Although a musician, and in his own words, not a businessman, it appears he has accumulated assets valued at $100 million, and possibly more. It has been suggested he was picked for the role because of his low profile. There have been speculations that Putin, in fact, owns the funds, and Roldugin just acted as a proxy. Garry Kasparov said that "[Putin] controls enough money, probably more than any other individual in the history of human race".

=== Residences ===
==== Official government residences ====
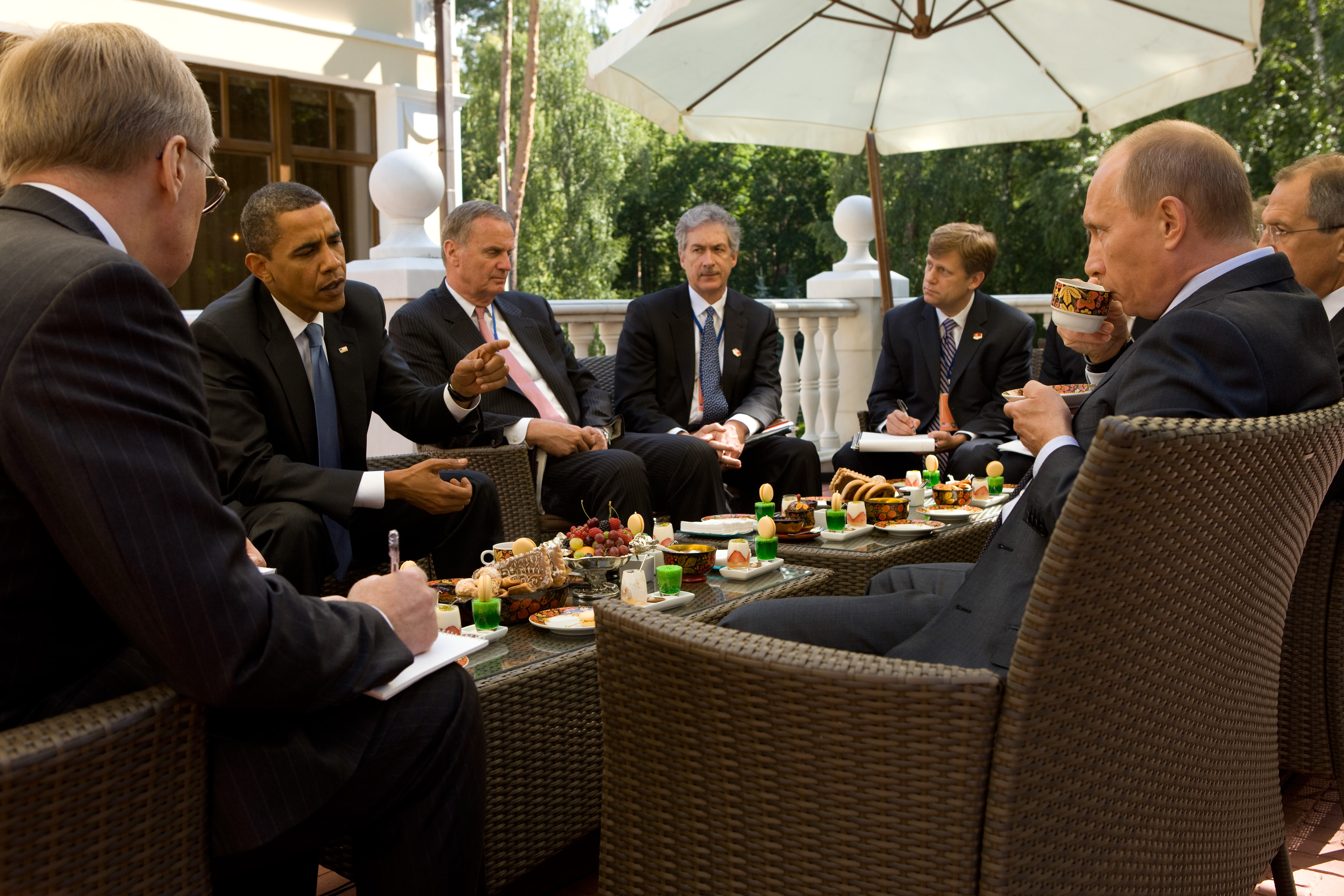
Putin receives Barack Obama at his residence in Novo-Ogaryovo in 2009

As president and prime minister, Putin has lived in numerous official residences throughout the country. These residences include: the Moscow Kremlin, Novo-Ogaryovo in Moscow Oblast, Gorki-9 near Moscow, Bocharov Ruchey in Sochi, Dolgiye Borody in Novgorod Oblast, and Riviera in Sochi. In August 2012, critics of Putin listed the ownership of 20 villas and palaces, nine of which were built during Putin's 12 years in power.

==== Personal residences ====
Soon after Putin returned from his KGB service in Dresden, East Germany, he built a dacha in Solovyovka on the eastern shore of Lake Komsomolskoye on the Karelian Isthmus in Priozersky District of Leningrad Oblast, near St. Petersburg. After the dacha burned down in 1996, Putin built a new one identical to the original and was joined by a group of seven friends who built dachas nearby. In 1996, the group formally registered their fraternity as a co-operative society, calling it Ozero ("Lake") and turning it into a gated community.

A massive Italianate-style mansion costing an alleged US$1 billion and dubbed "Putin's Palace" is under construction near the Black Sea village of Praskoveevka. In 2012, Sergei Kolesnikov, a former business associate of Putin's, told the BBC's Newsnight programme that he had been ordered by Deputy Prime Minister Igor Sechin to oversee the building of the palace. He also said that the mansion, built on government land and sporting three helipads, plus a private road paid for from state funds and guarded by officials wearing uniforms of the official Kremlin guard service, have been built for Putin's private use.

On 19 January 2021, two days after Alexei Navalny was detained by Russian authorities upon his return to Russia, a video investigation by him and the Anti-Corruption Foundation (FBK) was published, accusing Putin of using fraudulently obtained funds to build the estate for himself in what he called "the world's biggest bribe". In the investigation, Navalny said that the estate is 39 times the size of Monaco and costs over 100 billion rubles ($1.35 billion) to construct. It also showed aerial footage of the estate via a drone and a detailed floorplan of the palace that Navalny said was given by a contractor, which he compared to photographs from inside the palace that were leaked onto the Internet in 2011. He also detailed an elaborate corruption scheme allegedly involving Putin's inner circle that allowed Putin to hide billions of dollars to build the estate. Since the prelude to the Russian invasion of Ukraine, Putin prefers to travel in an armored train to flying.

=== Pets ===
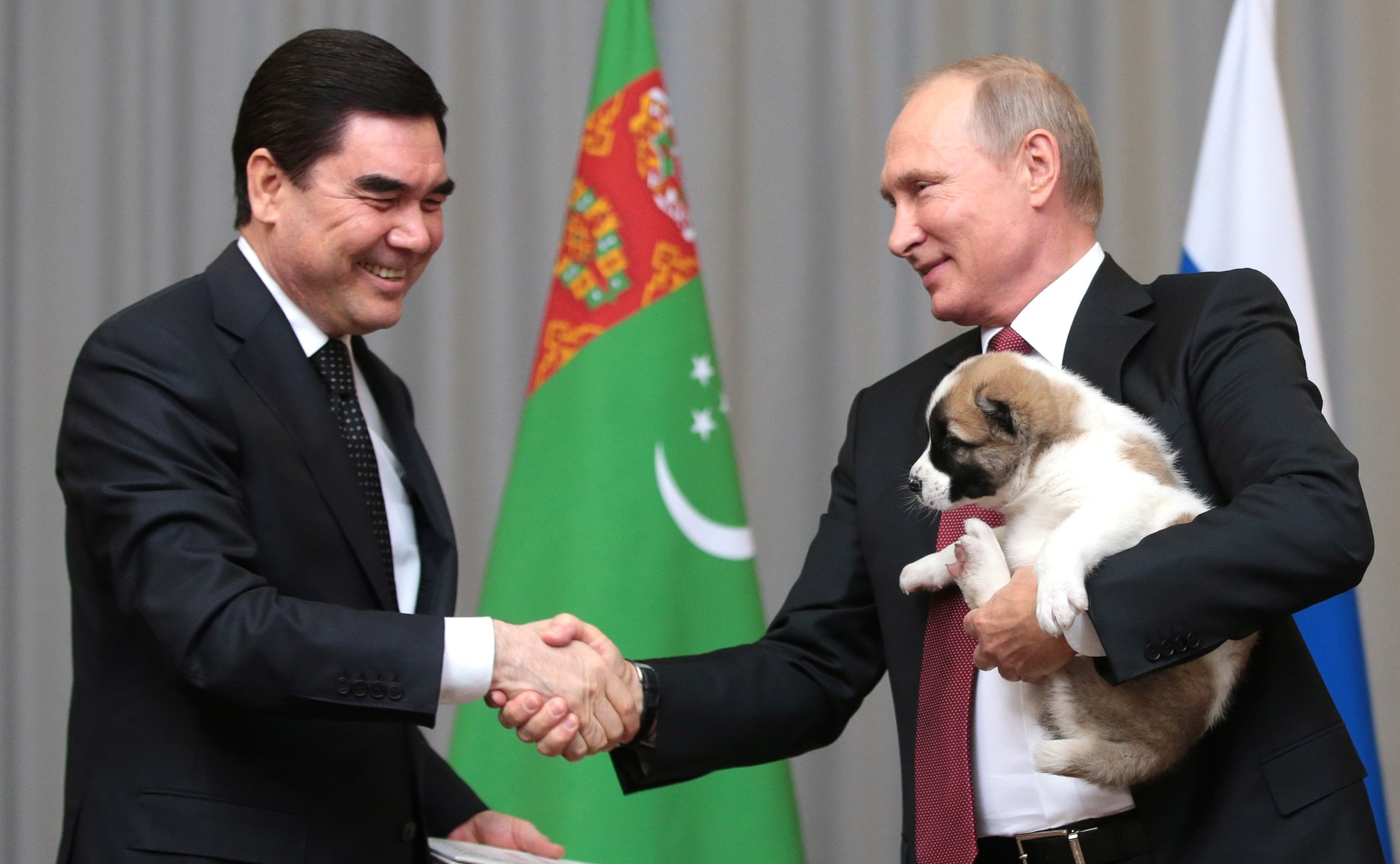
Putin's pet, named Verni, was a birthday gift from Gurbanguly Berdimuhamedow, president of Turkmenistan, during a meeting in Sochi in October 2017.

Putin has received five dogs from various national leaders: Konni, Buffy, Yume, Verni and Pasha. Konni died in 2014. When Putin first became president, the family had two poodles, Tosya and Rodeo. They reportedly stayed with his ex-wife Lyudmila after their divorce.

=== Religion ===
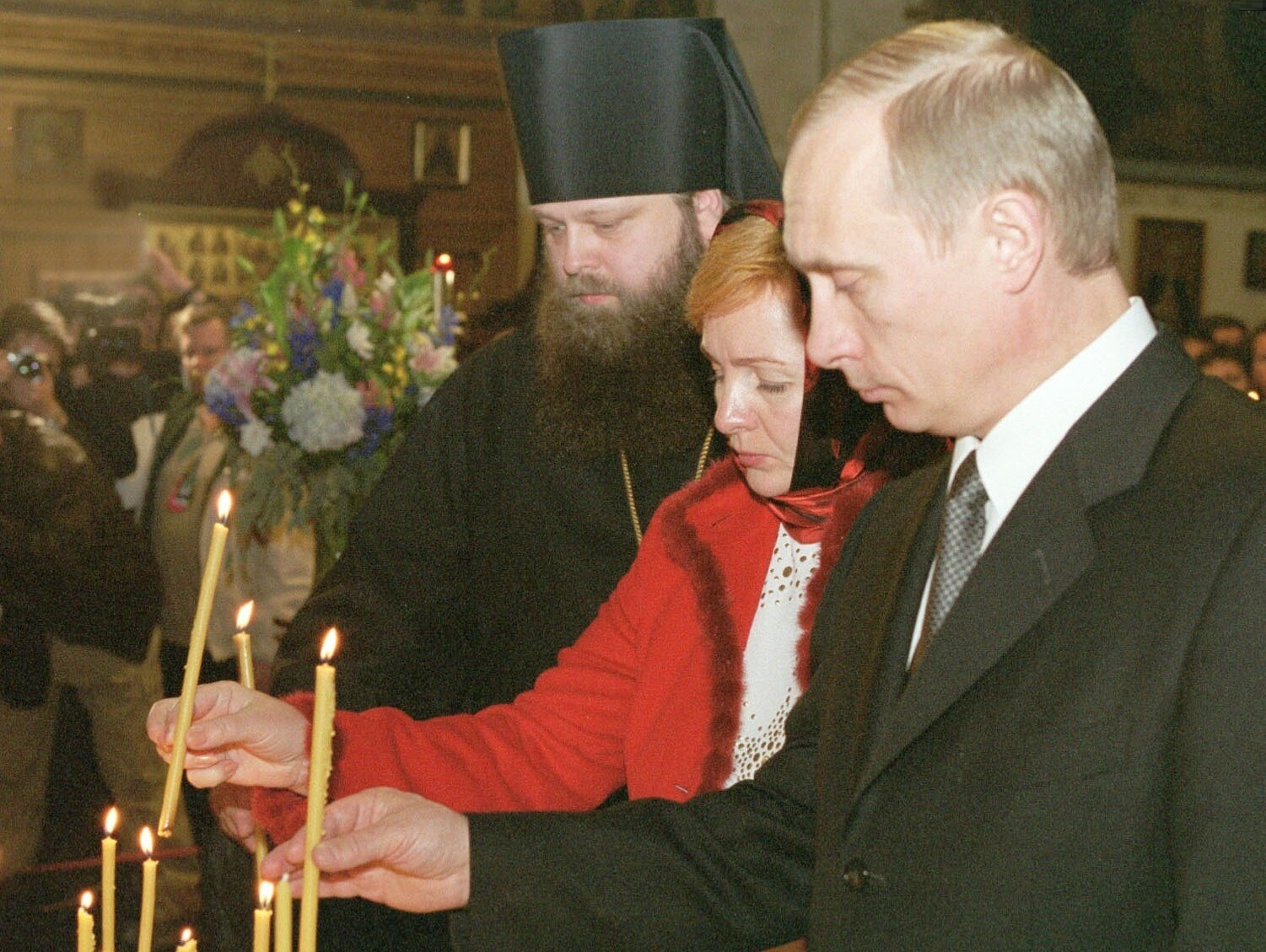
Putin and wife Lyudmila in New York at a service for victims of the September 11 attacks, 16 November 2001

Putin is Russian Orthodox. His mother was a devout Christian who attended the Russian Orthodox Church; his father was an atheist. Although his mother kept no icons at home, she attended church regularly, despite government persecution of her faith at that time. His mother secretly baptized him as a baby, and she regularly took him to services.

According to Putin, his religious awakening began after a serious car crash involving his wife in 1993, and a life-threatening fire that burned down their dacha in August 1996. Shortly before an official visit to Israel, Putin's mother gave him his baptismal cross, telling him to get it blessed. Putin has stated, "I did as she said and then put the cross around my neck. I have never taken it off since".

When asked in 2007 whether he believes in God, he replied, "There are things I believe, which should not in my position, at least, be shared with the public at large for everybody's consumption because that would look like self-advertising or a political striptease". Putin's rumoured confessor is Russian Orthodox bishop Tikhon Shevkunov. The sincerity of his Christianity has been rejected by his former advisor Sergei Pugachev.

=== Sports ===
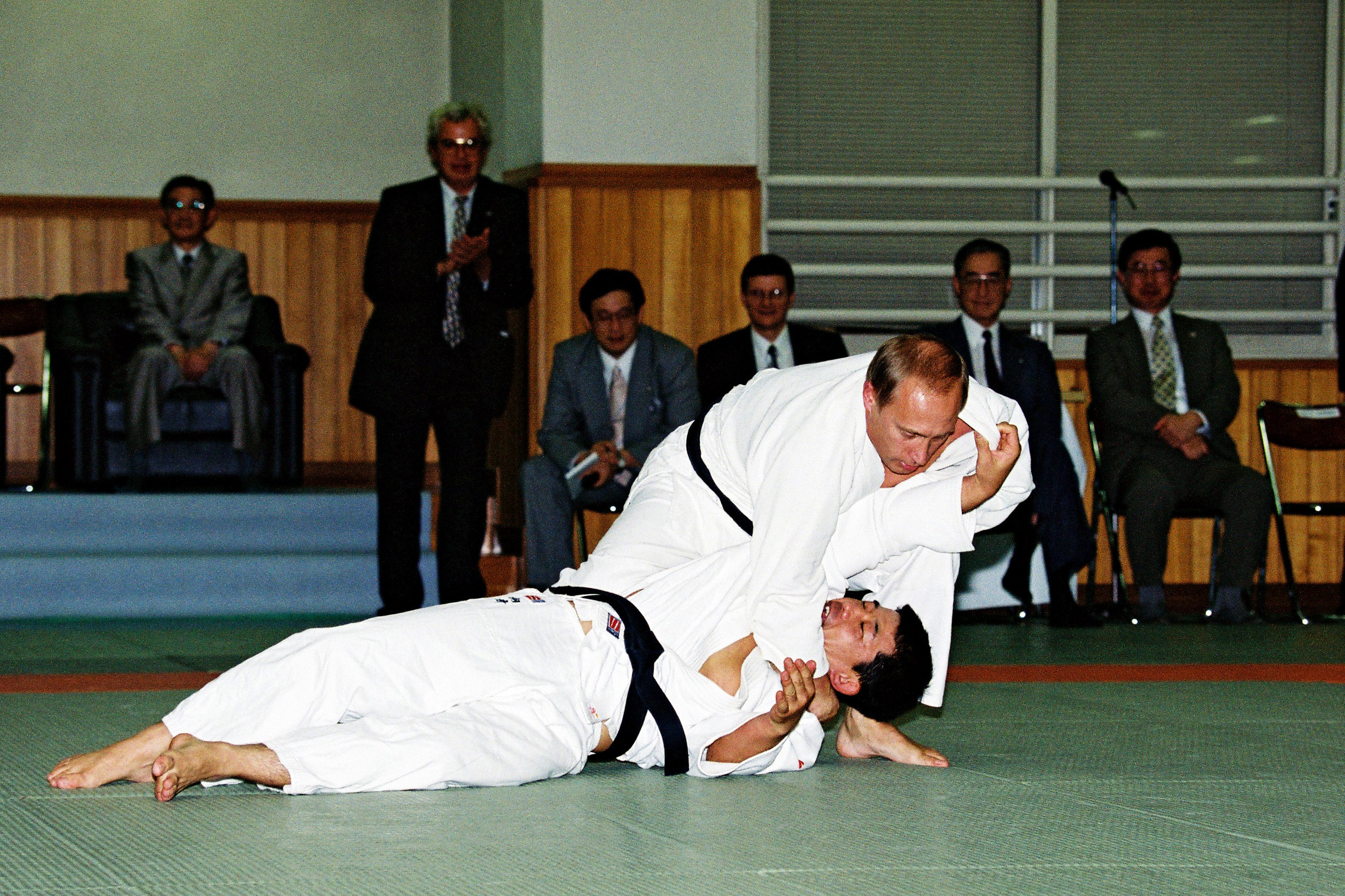
Putin practicing judo in Tokyo, Japan, in September 2000

Putin watches football and supports FC Zenit Saint Petersburg. He also displays an interest in ice hockey and bandy, and played in a star-studded hockey game on his 63rd birthday.

Putin has been practicing judo since he was 11, before switching to sambo at the age of fourteen. He won competitions in both sports in Leningrad (now Saint Petersburg). He was awarded eighth dan of the black belt in 2012, becoming the first Russian to achieve the status. He was rewarded an eighth-degree karate black belt in 2014.

He co-authored a book titled Learn Judo with Vladimir Putin in Russian (2000), (Note: Russian: Учимся дзюдо с Владимиром Путиным) and Judo: History, Theory, Practice in English (2004). Benjamin Wittes, a black belt in taekwondo and aikido and editor of Lawfare, has disputed Putin's martial arts skills, stating that there is no video evidence of Putin displaying any real noteworthy judo skills.

In March 2022, Putin was removed from all positions in the International Judo Federation (IJF) due to the Russo-Ukrainian war.

=== Health ===
In July 2022, the director of the U.S. Central Intelligence Agency, William Burns, stated they had no evidence to suggest Putin was unstable or in bad health. The statement was made because of increasing unconfirmed media speculation about Putin's health. Burns had previously been U.S. ambassador to Russia, and had personally observed Putin for over two decades, including a personal meeting in November 2021. A Kremlin spokesperson also dismissed rumours of Putin's bad health.

The Russian political magazine Sobesednik (Russian: Собеседник) alleged in 2018 that Putin had a sensory room installed in his private residence in the Novgorod Oblast. The White House, as well as Western generals, politicians, and political analysts, have questioned Putin's mental health after two years of isolation during the COVID-19 pandemic.

In April 2022, London tabloid newspaper The Sun asserted that based on video footage Putin may have Parkinson's disease. This speculation, which has not been supported by medical professionals, has spread in part due to Russia's invasion of Ukraine, which many saw as an irrational act. The Kremlin rejected the possibility of Parkinson's along with outside medical professionals, who stress that it is impossible to diagnose the condition based on video clips alone.

== Awards and honours ==
At least fifteen countries have awarded Vladimir Putin civilian honors since 2001. Putin has been awarded honorary doctorates and other awards from organizations across the world, but some of these were revoked after the 2022 Russian invasion of Ukraine.

== See also ==
- Bibliography of Vladimir Putin
- Bibliography of Russian history (1991–present)

== Explanatory notes ==
Government offices
Preceded by Nikolay Kovalyov	Director of the Federal Security Service; 1998–1999	Succeeded by Nikolai Patrushev
Preceded by Nikolay Bordyuzha	Secretary of the Security Council; 1999	Succeeded by Sergei Ivanov
Preceded by Alexei Kudrin	Deputy Chief of the Presidential Administration — Head of the Main Supervisory; 1997–1998	Succeeded by Nikolai Patrushev
Political offices
Preceded by Sergei Stepashin	Prime Minister of Russia; 1999–2000	Succeeded by Mikhail Kasyanov
Preceded by Boris Yeltsin	President of Russia; 2000–2008	Succeeded by Dmitry Medvedev
Preceded by Viktor Zubkov	Prime Minister of Russia; 2008–2012	Succeeded by Dmitry Medvedev
Preceded by Dmitry Medvedev	President of Russia; 2012–present	Incumbent
Diplomatic posts
Preceded by Tony Blair	Chairman of the Group of 8; 2006	Succeeded by Angela Merkel
Preceded by Barack Obama	Chairman of APEC; 2012	Succeeded by Susilo Bambang Yudhoyono
Preceded by Felipe Calderón	Chairman of the Group of 20; 2013	Succeeded by Tony Abbott
Preceded by Viktor Zubkov	Chairman of the Council of Ministers of the Union State; 2008–2012	Succeeded by Dmitry Medvedev
Party political offices
Preceded by Boris Gryzlov	Chairman of United Russia; 2008–2012	Succeeded by Dmitry Medvedev
Preceded by Office established	De facto leader of United Russia; 2001–present	Incumbent
Preceded by Office established	Leader of All-Russia People's Front; 2013–present	Incumbent
