= Vyacheslav Zaitsev =

Russian fashion designer (1938–2023)

- Вячеслав Зайцев
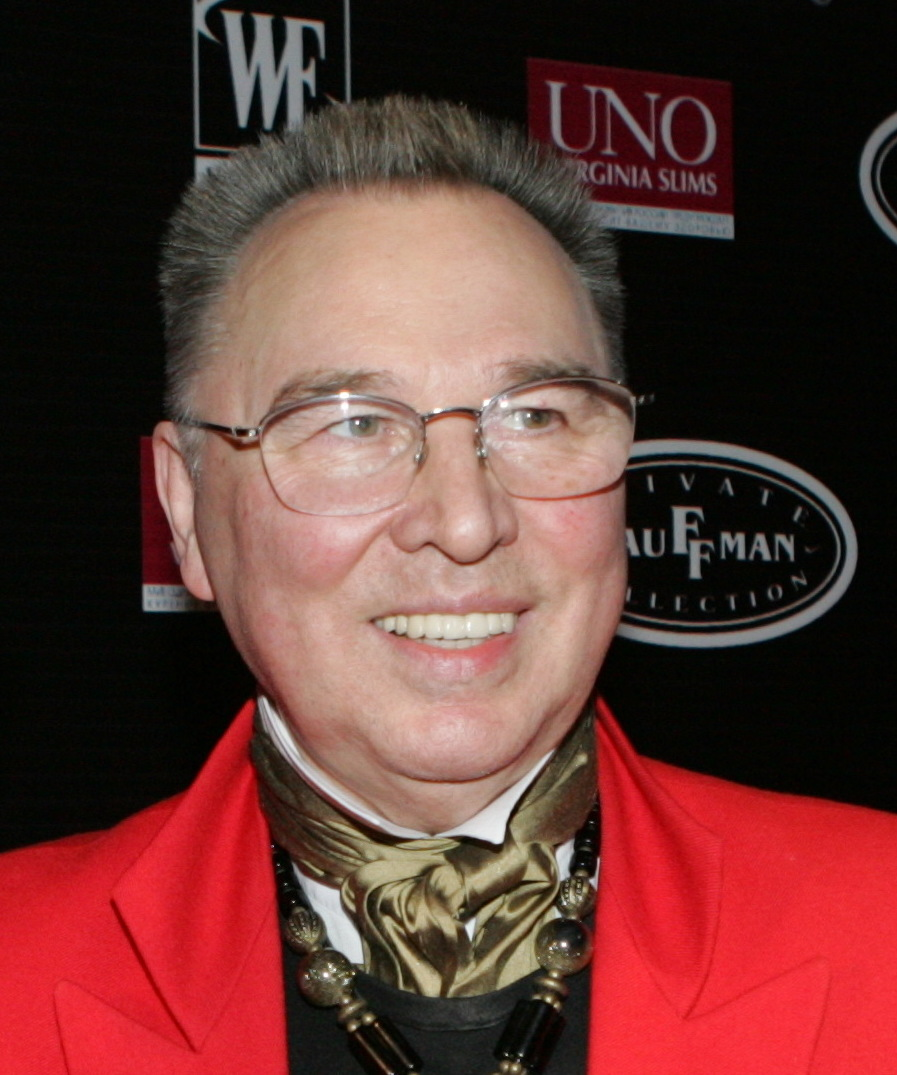
- Born: Vyacheslav Mikhailovich Zaitsev; 2 March 1938; Ivanovo, Russian SFSR, Soviet Union
- Died: 30 April 2023 (aged 85); Shchyolkovo, Moscow Oblast, Russia
- Occupations: Fashion designer; painter; artist
- Label: Slava Zaitsev
- Website: slavazaitsev.com

Vyacheslav Mikhailovich Zaitsev (Russian: Вячеслав Михайлович Зайцев; 2 March 1938 – 30 April 2023) was a Russian fashion designer, painter, graphic artist, and theatrical costume designer. He was considered to be one of the most prominent fashion designers of the Soviet Union, and had been compared to Christian Dior and Yves Saint Laurent.

Zaitsev first came to prominence in the 1960s, when he was featured in the magazine Paris Match and dubbed the "Red Dior" by the French media. By the 1990s, he had designed outfits for Russian politicians and foreign celebrities. His style was influenced by traditional Russian and Slavic designs, featuring shawls and quilted jackets, and several of his designs were intended for "larger" women. The Hermitage Museum has an extensive collection of his designs on exhibition.

== Early life ==
Zaitsev was born on 2 March 1938 in Ivanovo to Mikhail Yakovlevich Zaitsev and Maria Ivanovna Zaitseva. His father was a victim of the repressions of Joseph Stalin and was incarcerated in one of Stalin's camps, and his mother was a cleaner and laundress. From 1945 to 1952, he studied at Secondary School No. 22 in Ivanovo. As his father was deemed by the State to be an enemy of the people, Zaitsev was denied the opportunity to study at an industrial academy, a theatrical school, and a pilot training school.

In 1952, he began his studies in the Faculty of Applied Arts at the University of Chemistry and Technology in Ivanovo, and during this time he became interested in manufacturing and received the credentials to become a textile artist. He graduated, with honours, from the university in 1956. After realising that working with textiles was his dream, he moved to Moscow in 1956, and commenced studies at the Moscow Textile Institute, from which he graduated in 1962 with a bachelor's degree in painting and designing. Whilst he was studying at the institute, he married Marina Vladimirovna Zaitseva in 1959, and fathered a son, Yegor Vyacheslavovich Zaitsev, in 1960.

== Career ==
=== Career in the Soviet Union ===
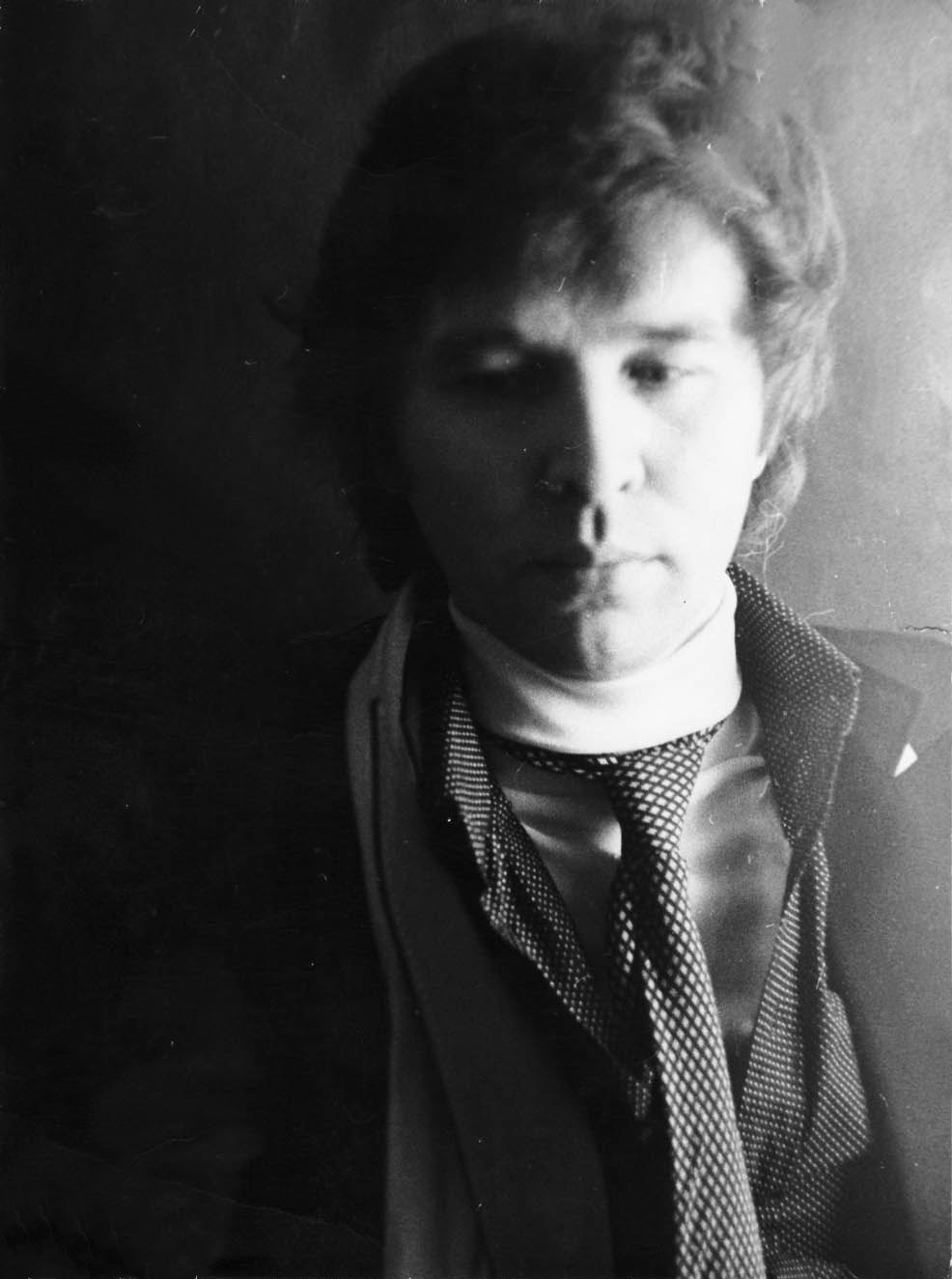
Zaitsev c. 1960s

During the Soviet era, clothing was dominated by Zaitsev and Valentin Yudashkin, and he was compared to other world-renowned fashion designers such as Christian Lacroix, Christian Dior, Pierre Cardin and Yves Saint Laurent, Zaitsev was seen as being able to compete with Western designers; however, under the communist regime, the only country outside of the USSR where Zaitsev was able to work was Czechoslovakia. Alexandre Vassiliev, a Russian-born, Paris-based fashion historian and designer, stated that "[i]f he had had a chance to show his collections abroad he would have been most possibly a world-famed brand."

In March 1962, he began work as the artistic director of experimental technical garment factory Mosoblsovnarkhoza, where he oversaw production of women's clothing for retail stores in Moscow and the surrounding region. Zaitsev came to attention in 1963 when he designed a chic version of the telogreika, Pavlovsky Posad shawl-inspired skirts and multi-coloured valenki for kolkhoz workers. Whilst his creations were lauded by the authorities for "sparkling with all colours of the rainbow", his collection was not approved for production by the Methodical Council. In February 1963, Paris Match became the first foreign media outlet to profile Zaitsev, and rated his collection highly.

In March 1965, Zaitsev became the chief designer at the All-Union Fashion House (Dom modeley) on Kuznetsky Most. In April 1965 Pierre Cardin, Marc Bohan (then with Dior), and Guy Laroche visited Moscow and became familiar with Zaitsev's works, although Zaitsev was not present, and was covered in an article of Paris Match. Pierre Cardin called Zaitsev an "equal among equals", and the French press dubbed him the "Red Dior". Between 1965 and 1968, Zaitsev's works, known as "the Russian series", were displayed abroad.

Zaitsev resigned from the All-Union Fashion House in 1978, and began to work out of a small studio. His mother, with whom he had a great affinity, died in the same year, and after her death he took up writing poetry. Zaitsev designed a collection of costumes for the Soviet team for the 1980 Summer Olympics which were held in Moscow, for which he was awarded the Order of the Badge of Honor. He authored two books in 1980, Such Changeable Fashion (Russian: Такая изменчивая мода) and This Multifaceted World of Fashion (Russian: Этот многоликий мир моды), which were republished in Bulgaria and Czechoslovakia in 1983.

In 1982 he transformed his studio into the "Slava Zaitsev Moscow Fashion House" (Russian: «Московский Дом Моды Вячеслава Зайцева»), also known as Dom Mody, becoming the first Soviet couturier who was permitted by the Soviet government to label his own clothing. By the mid-1980s, Dom Mody employed 600 civil servants and was required to produce some 2 million roubles' worth of clothing each year. In 1984 it was reported that Dom Mody had served 10,000 customers, and prices ranged from US$170 to US$260 for prêt-à-porter dresses, and up to US$1,000 for haute couture gowns. Zaitsev met with Thierry Mugler in 1985 in Moscow, and the French couturier photographed Zaitsev's fashions for an article in Paris Match.

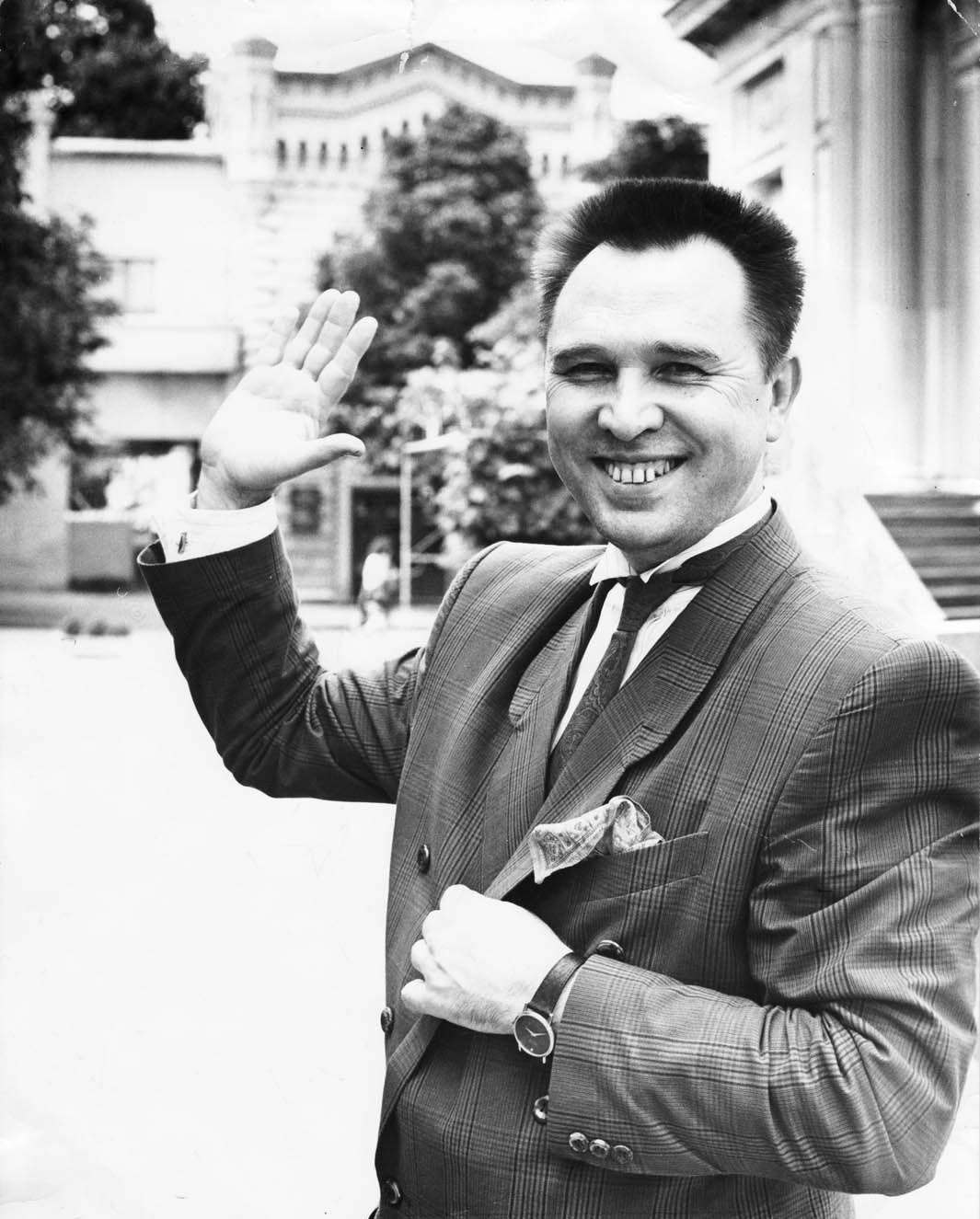
Zaitsev in the 1980s

Raisa Gorbachyova wore Zaitsev creations when she made what The New York Times described as a "perestroika splash" in the 1980s. Due to the patronage of the Soviet First Lady, he gained a reputation as one of the world's hottest fashion designers, and became an international celebrity and a household name in Russia. Zaitsev fashions were displayed at Expo '85 in Tsukuba, Japan, although it was not until 1986 that he was able to visit a capitalist country when he displayed some of his works in the Soviet pavilion at Expo 86 in Vancouver, British Columbia, Canada.

A member of the Communist Party of the Soviet Union, Zaitsev affirmed his belief in the Soviet Union and the future of communism, including the communist ideals of a workers' paradise. The New York Times reported that by the 1980s, he became disillusioned with the Party. Zaitsev told the newspaper that at mandatory party meetings he "began to defend the right to be free, as it says in the Communist charter. They constantly tried to distract me, not to let me get in. I'd be stuck in the elevator or I'd be sent off to some other event." This disillusionment led to Zaitsev quitting the party in the late 1980s.

Zaitsev often complained to the Soviet authorities about the lack of essential materials for his craft, and The New York Times noted in 1988 that he "until recently" had been forced to use dressmaker's mannequins from World War II. Zaitsev signed a three-year contract with Intertorg Inc. in August 1987, which saw Dom Mody selling its designs in the United States, with profits going to the design house rather than the Soviet Treasury. The contract was the first commercial consumer venture signed between the two countries. In October 1987 he showed his collection at the iconic Waldorf-Astoria in New York City, which critics called overwrought, out-of-date and reminiscent of Western fashion from several seasons earlier. Undiscouraged, Zaitsev said that he planned to return with a "pared-down, sexier collection". He returned to New York City in 1988 where he designed costumes for the musical revue Sophisticated Ladies, based on the music of Duke Ellington. Participation in his first Paris fashion shows came in January 1988 at the invitation of Madame Carven, whom Zaitsev met in Moscow in December 1987, showing his collection under the banner of "Russian Seasons". He also joined the Maison de Couture and was made an honorary citizen of Paris, by then mayor Jacques Chirac. The following year in March, Maison de Couture named Zaitsev as "Man of the Year in the World of Fashion"

In September 1989, Zaitsev showed his collections in West Germany for the first time under the theme "Fashion and Music Revue '90", and in December 1989 he won first prize at "Five Top Fashion Designers in the World–90" in Tokyo, Japan, where he was competing against Donna Karan, Claude Montana, Hanae Mori and Byblos.

=== Career in post-Soviet Russia ===
Whilst during the Soviet era Zaitsev's work was funded by the Soviet government, which as a state employee he earned the maximum of 1,000 roubles per month, after the collapse of the Soviet Union he became responsible for financing the business out of his private income, with New Russians making up the bulk of his clientele. In 1991 he designed a new uniform for the Russian police, and was bestowed the title of Honored Worker in the Field of the Arts. By 1992, Jane Fonda, Ted Turner and Herb Ritts were amongst the celebrities who became customers of Zaitsev, and in the same year Zaitsev launched a women's perfume named Maroussia, in conjunction with French-based L'Oréal. The perfume which is classified as a "floral oriental" and is still in production, was launched in a few European countries in 1992 and was launched worldwide in 1993.

1992 was also a significant year in Zaitsev's career, because it was then that he presented for the first time his recent fashion collection, as well as his paintings and works on paper in prestigious venues, both in New York and in Beverly Hills. Never before was Russian fashion design demonstrated on the American runways, and never before were Zaitsev's most personal paintings and drawings allowed to be exhibited in the West. Fashion shows and exhibitions were held at the Bowles-Sorokko Galleries on both the East and the West Coasts, and they were widely attended, marking the beginning of cultural exchanges in the area of visual arts between the US and the new Russia. According to Serge Sorokko, then president of the Bowles-Sorokko Galleries, Zaitsev was a lifelong painter, but was never free to exhibit publicly his art before. "[That was] because his work was outside the dogmas of socialist realism", Sorokko told The New York Times. "He was permitted to paint only for his own soul. When I visited his home in Moscow, I saw 20 years of pictorial work on his walls."

In 1994, Zaitsev hosted the inaugural Nadezhda Lamanova Prize competition for professional Russian designers at Dom Mody, and the competition has been held under his patronage since. In 1996 he launched a competition in Russia, using the slogan of "Goodbye Barbie, welcome Maroussia", to find the "purest essence of" female adolescence, with the aim of decreasing the influence of the American doll in Russia. In Zaitsev's words, "Barbie is rigid, cold, cynical, pragmatic. Now look at the faces of our children ... they are not only beautiful, but sweet, charming and mysterious. In every face there's a secret, and so must the new Russian doll". Also in 1996, a follow-up to 1992s Maroussia, a floriental fragrance named Authentic Maroussia was launched but has since been discontinued.

Zaitsev was the tailor to Vladimir Zhirinovsky for his 1996 Russian presidential campaign. Zaitsev, who planned to vote for Boris Yeltsin, stated on Zhirinovsky, "He wanted something distinctly Russian, so I thought back to the military-style jackets of the 20s, the 30s—like Stalin, only in new colours". On 27 May 1996, President of Russia Boris Yeltsin awarded Zaitsev the State Prize of the Russian Federation in the field of literature and the arts. In 1996, Zaitsev was also made an honorary citizen of the city of his birth, Ivanovo.

His 2001 collection entitled Dedication saw the most expensive dresses costing $10,000–12,000, whilst the cheapest were in the $2,000–3,000 price range.

When President of Russia Vladimir Putin was due to travel on a state visit to the United Kingdom in June 2003, Zaitsev designed attire for First Lady of Russia Lyudmila Putina to wear for the visit, which included an audience with Queen Elizabeth II. Zaitsev told Zhizn that it took some time to convince Putina to wear a hat, due to Russian women in general not wearing them.

By February 2005, Zaitsev had opened four Slava Zaytsev Men's Wear stores in Ryazan, Ufa, Orenburg, and Samara. The New York Times described Zaitsev in 2004 as one of the few Soviet icons who is still an icon in modern-day Russia, and Time magazine reported in 2007 that the Zaitsev name has 93% brand awareness in Russia. In 2007 Kommersant commissioned VCIOM to run a poll on public perception as to the make-up of the Russian elite; Zaitsev, who is often referred to as the Patriarch of Russian fashion, was rated at 74.

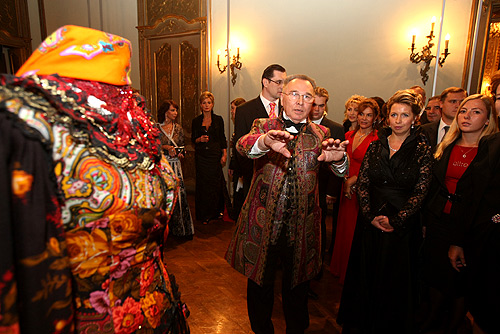
Zaitsev and Svetlana Medvedeva at the exhibition The Russian Evening-2008 in Milan, Italy in September 2008

Zaitsev was not interested in achieving worldwide renown by showing his creations abroad, preferring to stay true to his Russian roots and encouraged other Russian designers not to be influenced by the West. Zaitsev was quoted by Women's Wear Daily in April 2008 as saying:

I think that as a Russian artist, I should show in Russia. At the beginning of the 1990s, I had the chance to show in Paris, and I realised that it's not my place.

In 2007 Zaitsev took part in the TV show "Fashion Verdict" (Russian: Модный приговор) on Channel One, in which he acted as a judge passing down verdict on contestants' fashion sense. After visiting Ashgabat in June 2008 for the Turkmen Textile Exhibition, Zaitsev stated that he was fascinated by traditional Turkmen clothing, and announced plans for a new collection which would incorporate traditional Turkmen elements. The casual wear collection is to be made exclusively from cotton from Turkmenistan and would feature the traditional Turkmen embroidery which captured his imagination. In September 2008, Zaitsev participated in The Russian Evening-2008 at the Institute for International Political Studies in Milan, which was attended by Svetlana Medvedeva and Clio Maria Bittoni, the wife of Italian President Giorgio Napolitano.

Zaitsev had always been an admirer of the costumes sketches supplied by Pablo Picasso and Albert Benois, amongst others, for Sergei Diaghilev's Paris troupe, and to celebrate the 100th anniversary of Diaghilev's Ballets Russes, Zaitsev's collection for the 2009 Russian Fashion Week paid homage to the Russian ballet impresario.

== Death ==
Zaitsev died on 30 April 2023, at the age of 85 of gastrointestinal bleeding in a Shchyolkovo city hospital. He previously suffered from Parkinson's disease, being partially paralyzed, with impaired ability to talk and walk.

== Fashion style ==
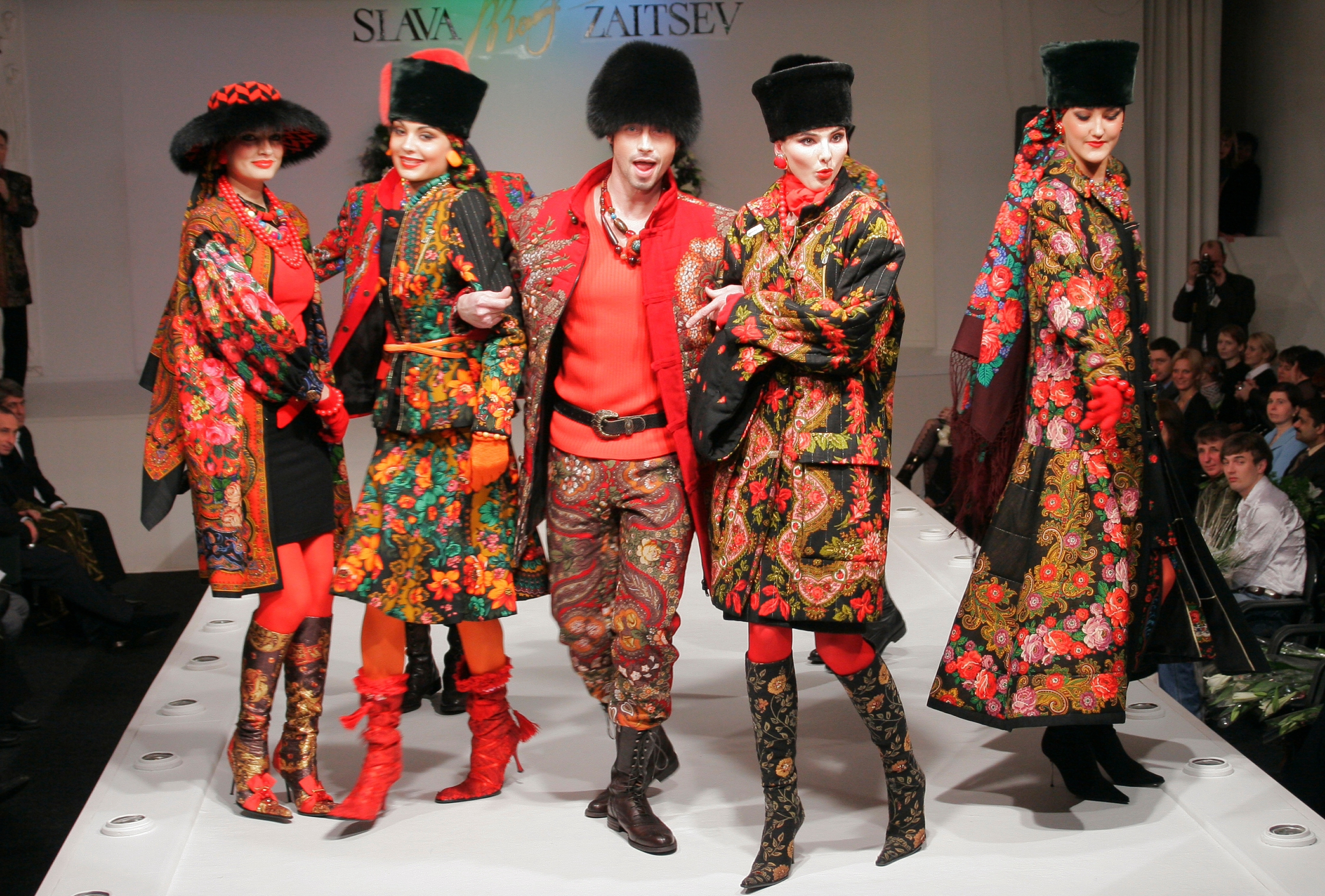
Fashion show of Slava Zaitsev featuring creations inspired by traditional Pavlovo Posad shawls

Zaitsev stated that his mother, Maria Ivanovna, was a cleaning lady and never owned a smart dress. In 2004, The New York Times stated, "[i]t is her stolid image that he has been dressing all these years in flounces and feathers, poufs and peplums, gold and glitter." During the Soviet era, he frequently complained that he designed collections for the "larger" woman in the 1970s, but only models up to size 48 were accepted for production.

Whilst Zaitsev regarded fashion designers Coco Chanel, Christian Dior, Gianfranco Ferré and Hubert de Givenchy as idols, his own creations were strongly influenced by traditional Russian and Slavic styles, and his collections included a variety of theme-based shows reflecting his take on the industry at the time. His collections included the "Millennium of the Christianisation of Russia" in 1988; "Russian Seasons" in Paris in 1988; "Agony of Perestroika" in 1991; and "Recollections of the Future" in 1996–1997. In his creations, Zaitsev included elements such as traditional Pavlovo Posad shawls and embroidered quilted jackets, which were featured in collections such as "Expectation of Changes".
