= Basil of Pavlovsky Posad =

Russian saint

Vasily Gryaznov
- Portrait of St Vasily Gryaznov
- Born: 1816; Pavlovo-Posadsky District
- Died: February 16, 1869; Pavlovsky Posad
- Venerated in: Eastern Orthodoxy (Locally venerated saint)
- Beatified: 1999
- Major shrine: Pokrovsko-Vasilevskogo Monastery
- Feast: February 16

Basil of Pavlovsky Posad, born Vasily Gryaznov (1816 – February 16, 1869), also known as Holy Vasily, is a Russian saint, glorified in 1999 for living a righteous life.

== Life ==
Gryaznov was born in the village of Evseevo Bogorodskogo County, now known as Pavlovo-Posadsky District. His father, Ivan Semenovich Basil, was a farmer and his mother, Evdokia Zaharovna, home schooled the children in subjects such as Chasoslovu and the Psalms, instilling a deep faith and love for God.

During his youth Basil worked at a factory, where he fell under the influence of his workmates and began drinking wine and engaging in acts of vice and passion. He is said to have mourned his sins and asked for forgiveness many a time, before repeatedly falling under the pressure of the bad company he was associated with. In an act of desperation and frustration he recognised his mistakes by changing his name to Gryazny (Russian for “dirty”).

After repenting his sins Basil strived to live a sacred life. His plight became known, and many people came to him for advice on the scriptures. In his home town there were many Old Believers. Upon listening to his sermons up to seven thousand of them joined the official Orthodoxy.

In 1840 Jacob Labzin, a well known businessman and owner of head scarf factories in Pavlovsky Posad, came to Gryaznov for help. Basil helped him to see how to live a sacred life, and the two became comrades, Labzin marrying Basil's sister Akilina and incorporating Basil as a business partner. Even with his wealth Gryaznov continued to conduct a life of the sacred devotee, donating his money to the poor and, together with his sister and brother in law, built schools and almshouses. He dreamed to construct a monastery in Pavlovsky Posad, but this was not to be, marred by his death in 1869.

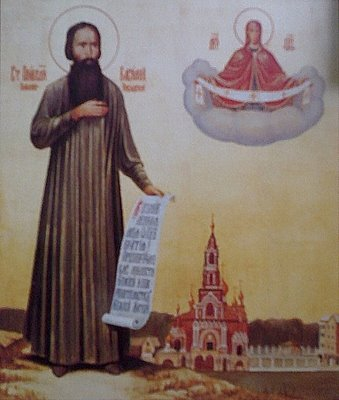
Icon of St Basil Gryaznov

== Legacy ==
After Basil's death people continued to address him through prayer, both to praise his righteous life and ask for direction in their own. His work among the poor was continued by Jacob Lazin and his sisters, and in 1894 the Pokrovsko-Vasilevskogo Monastery was built over his grave, now acting as his shrine of worship.

Gryaznov was recognised as a local saint in 1999, and is still praised throughout the Pavlovo-Posadsky District. His day of commemoration is February 16 (Orthodox calendar)

== See also ==
- Pavlovsky Posad

== Notes ==
- Ivan Shpitsberg. Святой Василий Грязнов: защита подмосковных акул текстильной промышленности / И. Шпицберг. - Москва : Научное о-во Атеист, 1925. - 32 с. : ил.
