= Pavlovo-Posadskiye izvestiya =

Russian: Павлово-Посадские известия
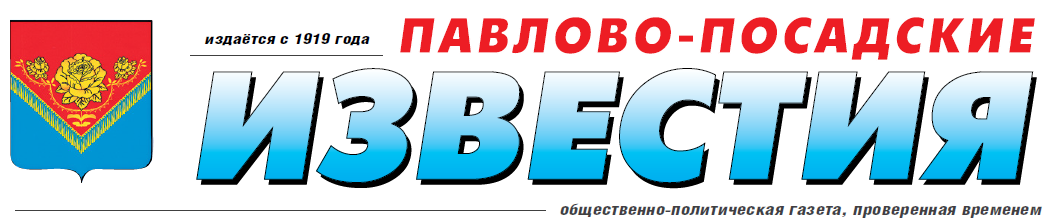
- Type: Weekly newspaper
- Format: А3
- Publisher: The News Agency Of Pavlovsky Posad District
- Editor-in-chief: Krasova Elena
- Founded: 28 July 1919
- Language: Russian
- Headquarters: Pavlovsky Posad, Moscow Oblast, Russia
- Circulation: 4050
- ISSN: 2225-6628
- Website: ia42.mosoblonline.ru

Pavlovo-Posadskiye izvestiya (Russian: Павлово-Посадские известия) is a regional weekly state-run newspaper in Pavlovsky Posad, Russia. It was founded in July 1919.

Since March 2005, the newspaper has been issued by the state institution of Moscow Oblast, The News Agency Of Pavlovsky Posad District.

The newspaper provides information on the government of Moscow Oblast and local government municipalities, The Chief Editor is Elena Krasova.

== History ==
In 1919, the newspaper was founded as Pavlovskiye Izvestiya. Since then, the name has been changed on several occasions (Udarnik, 1934, Leninskaya Iskra, 1950s, Znamya Lenina, 1961), until, in 1999, it became officially known as Pavlovo-Posadskiye izvestiya.

In 2005, the editorial office was reorganized and transformed into the state institution of Moscow Oblast, The News Agency Of Pavlovsky Posad District.

In 2014, the newspaper celebrated its 95th anniversary.
