= Oleg Chukhontsev =

Russian poet

- Олег Чухонцев
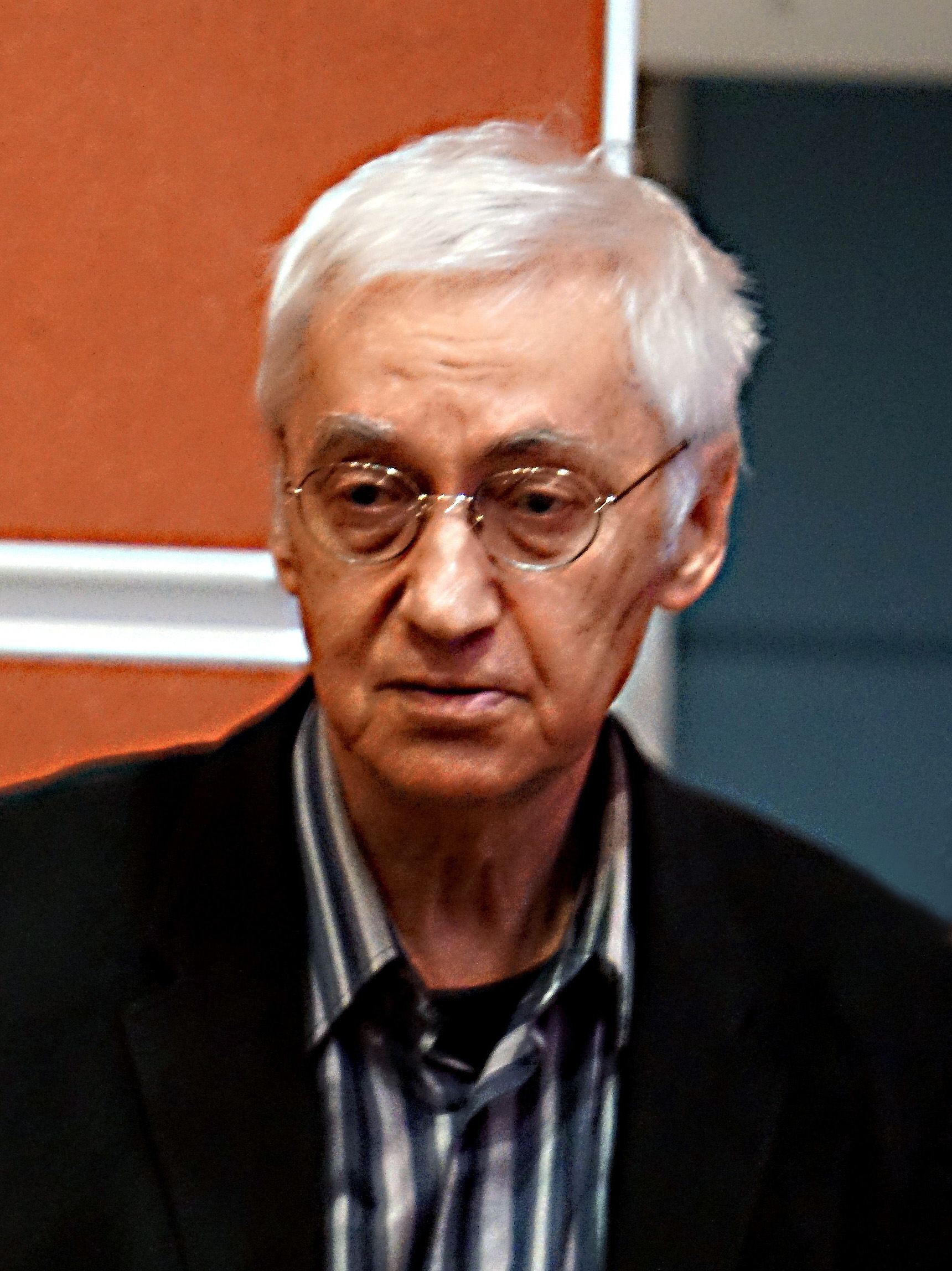
- Oleg Chukhontsev in 2019
- Born: 9 March 1938 (age 88)
- Education: State University of Education
- Occupation: Poet
- Awards: State Prize of the Russian Federation; Order "For Merit in Culture and Art"

Oleg Grigoryevich Chukhontsev (Russian: Оле́г Григо́рьевич Чухо́нцев, IPA: [ɐˈlʲeɡ ɡrʲɪˈɡorʲjɪvʲɪtɕ tɕʊˈxontsɨf]; born 1938 in Pavlovskiy Posad) is a Russian poet, representative neo-Acmeist poetry and the Sixtiers.

== Biography ==
In 1962 he finished the philology department of the State University of the Moscow Region. He worked for poetry section of journals Yunost and Novy Mir. His first poems were first published in 1958, however the first poetic books that were prepared by him ("The Intention" in 1960, and then "The Name") were not published, as his works did not suit the norms implied for the Soviet poetry in those days.

After the publication of his poem "A story about Kurbsky" in the Yunost journal in 1968, he was heavily attacked in press, and for 8 years his original works were officially considered "unpublishable". During these years Oleg Chukhontsev worked as a translator from the European languages, and local languages of the USSR.

His first book ("From Three Notebooks") was published in 1976, and the second one ("The Dormer Window") - in 1985, both still censured. His first book not affected by censorship-implied editing was "By Wind and by Ashes", published in 1989. In 2003 he published a book of new poems "Fifia".

His works are translated into various languages. He is a winner of several prizes, such as State Prize of the Russian Federation, Pushkin Prize, Anthologia premium for poetry, the Russian National Premium "Poet" and several others.

The name "Chukhontsev" comes from an old Russian word "chukhonets", which means "a Finn", or "a person of Finnish origin".
