= Death and state funeral of Boris Yeltsin =

2007 funeral of the 1st Russian president

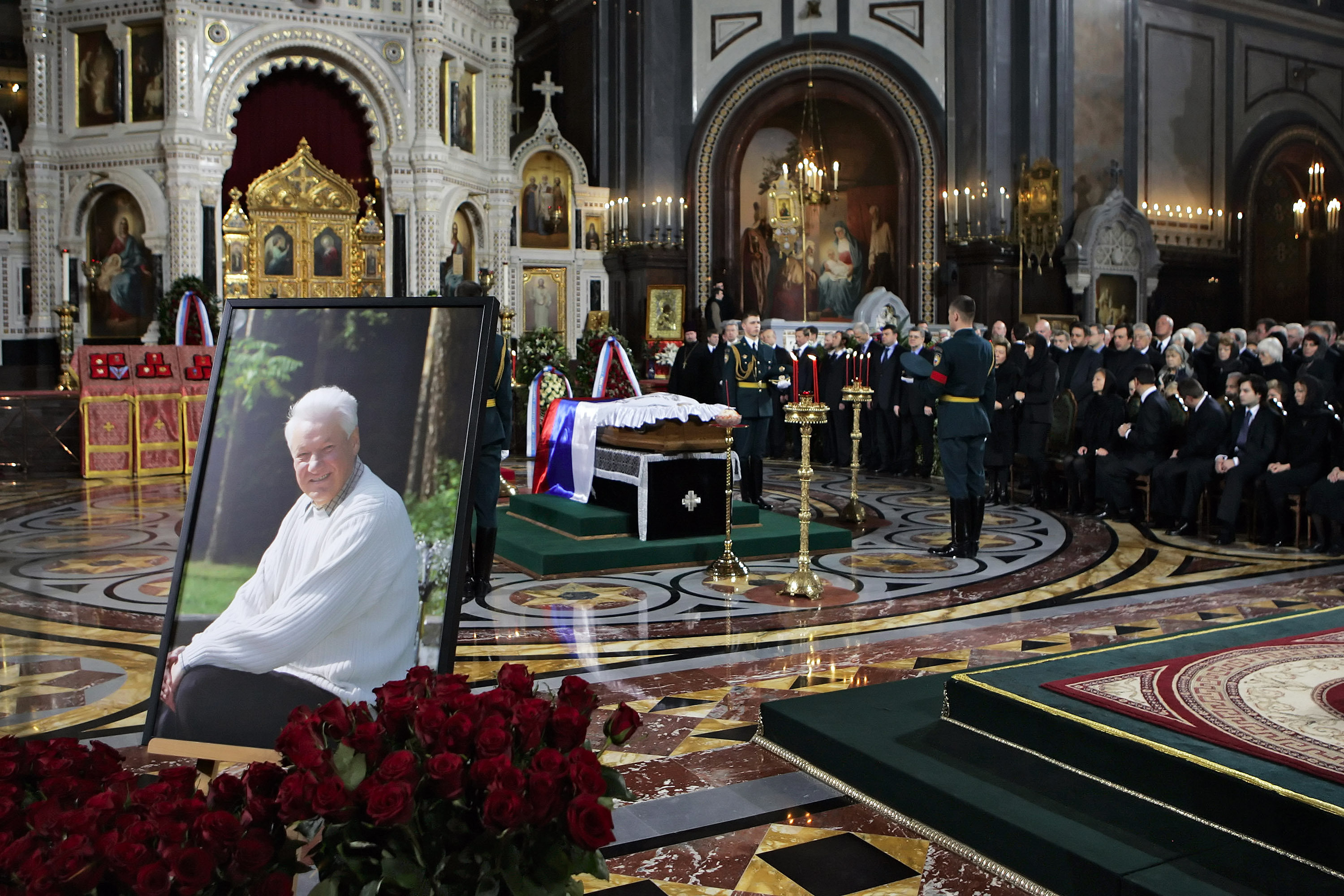
- Funeral service for Yeltsin in the cathedral, 2007
- Date: 23–25 April 2007
- Location: Cathedral of Christ the Saviour and Novodevichy Cemetery, Moscow
- Participants: Vladimir Putin, Sergey Sobyanin, Naina Yeltsina, Mikhail Fradkov, Dmitry Medvedev and others

Boris Yeltsin, the first President of Russia, died of cardiac arrest on 23 April 2007, twelve days after being admitted to the Central Clinical Hospital in Moscow. Yeltsin was the first Russian head of state to be buried in a church ceremony since Emperor Alexander III, 113 years prior.

On the day Yeltsin died, President Vladimir Putin declared the day of his funeral, held on 25 April 2007, to be a day of national mourning. The ceremony was broadcast live on the main Russian state TV channels, and was attended by current and former heads of state, with a number of them expressing their condolences. The lowering of the coffin into the grave was accompanied by an artillery salute.

== Last illness and cause of death ==
Yeltsin died due to heart failure at 15:45 Moscow time, as a result of progressive multiple organ dysfunction syndrome. Yeltsin was hospitalized for 12 days before his death. He was mostly bedridden for the last week, experiencing a sharp deterioration in his health along with heart pain in the last three days. Yeltsin's condition improved slightly on the morning of his death, but then his heart stopped twice, and doctors were unable to revive him the second time. According to Renat Akchurin, the heart surgeon who performed Yeltsin's bypass surgery in 1996, this heart failure was unexpected. An autopsy was carried out on the request of his relatives.

Shortly before his death, Yeltsin had traveled to the Middle East (Jordan, Israel and the Palestinian territories), which may have contributed to his health deteriorating.

President Vladimir Putin telephoned Yeltsin's widow Naina Yeltsina on 25 April 2007, to express his condolences. Others to express theirs were Angela Merkel, Jacques Chirac, George W. Bush, Lech Kaczyński, Helmut Kohl, Tony Blair and Bill Clinton. Students and staff of his native Urals State Technical University held a minute's silence and mourning to honor the former leader's memory.

== Farewell ceremony and funeral service ==
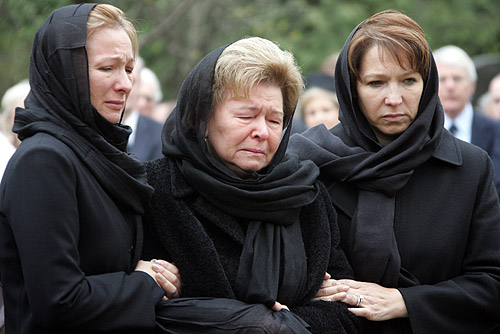
Yeltsin's widow and daughters

The day after his death, a farewell ceremony was held at the Cathedral of Christ the Savior, at 16:30 Moscow time. A half-couch casket and the Russian flag were placed in the center of the church, near a stand with Yeltsin's awards and portrait. The requiem liturgy was given by the Vicar of the Moscow Diocese Archbishop Arseny (Epifanov). An honor guard was present, formed of soldiers from the Kremlin Regiment. The church was open for viewing all evening and night, with around 25,000 people coming to pay their respects. All through the memorial service, representatives were present to accept condolences to the Yeltsin family members: his widow Naina, daughters Elena Okulova and Tatyana Dyachenko, and his grandchildren.

After the civil ceremony, which ended at 12:30 on 25 April, there was a farewell held for officials and representatives of foreign states.

The funeral service was led by Metropolitan Krutitsy and Kolomna Juvenal (Poyarkov), assisted by Metropolitan Kirill (Gundyaev) and Clement (Kapalin). During the reading of the Psalms, the funeral rites and the liturgy, Yeltsin was remembered as "First President of Russia Boris Nikolayevich," as opposed to the usual "servant of God, Boris". This change emphasized the President as the modern Russian equivalent to the monarch: the use of titles and patronymic name was the same construction as the heave offerings that were given to the monarch and members of the royal house until the abdication of Tsar Nicholas II.

== Burial ==
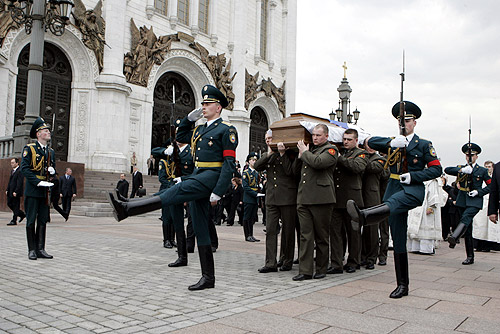
The coffin carried out of the Cathedral of Christ the Savior

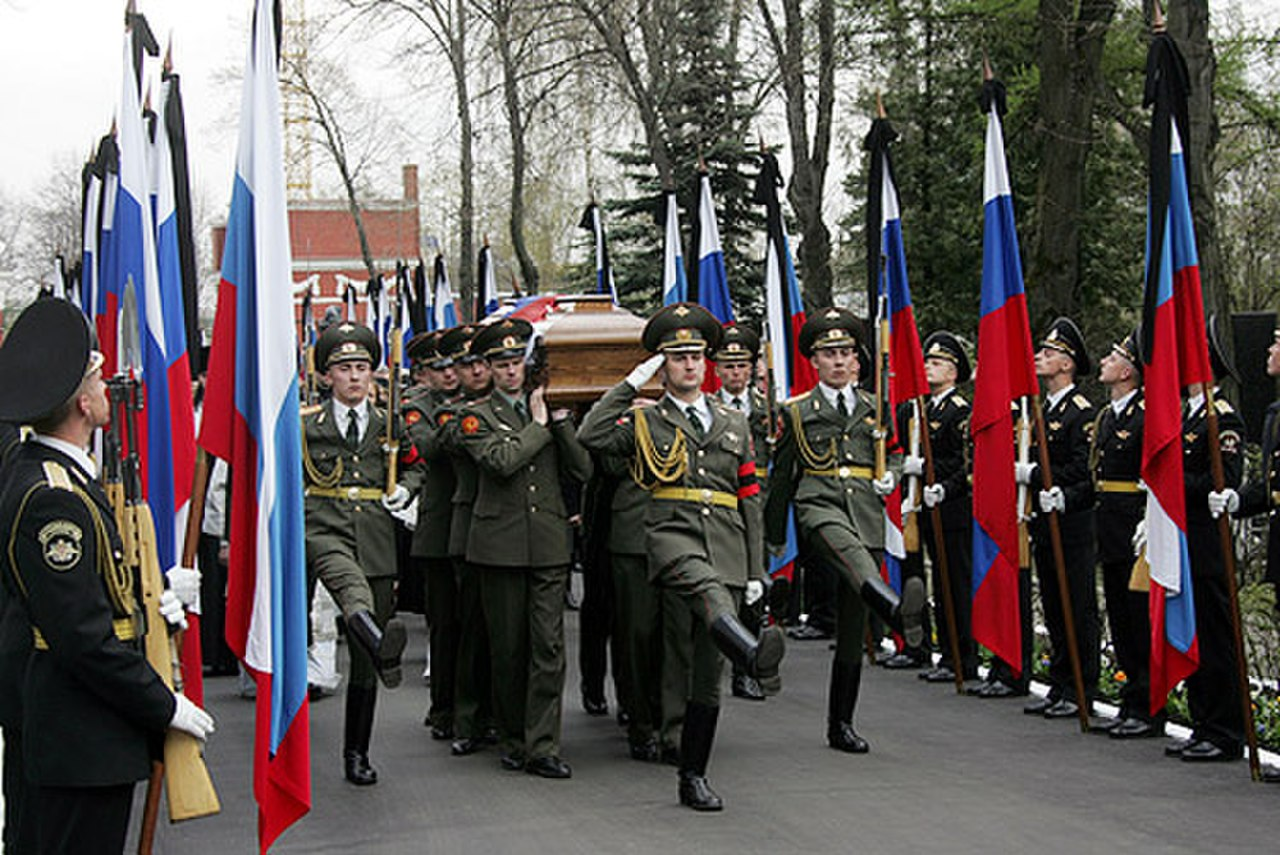
Yeltsin's coffin being carried to the cemetery

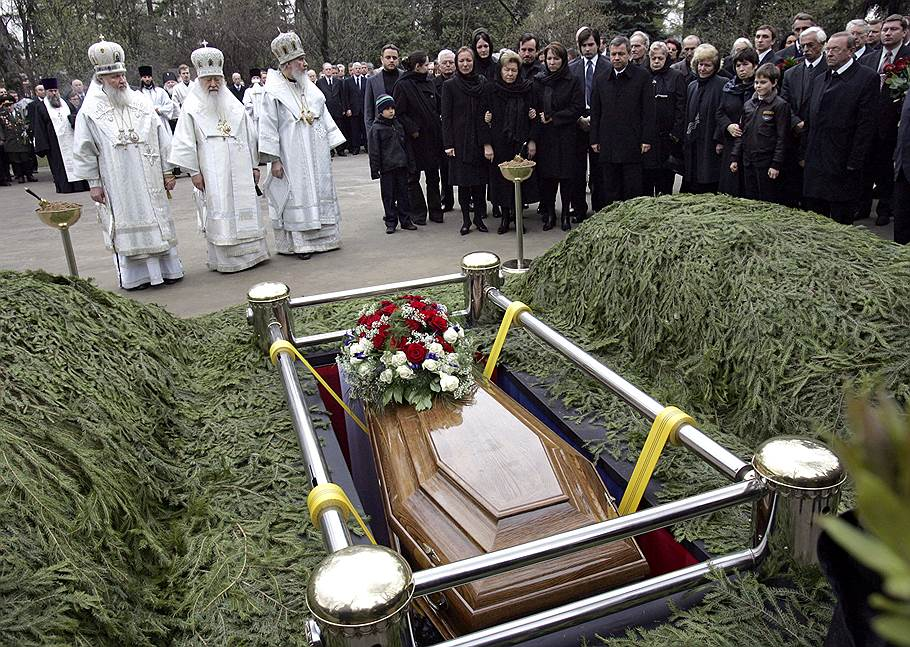
Yeltsin's coffin lowered into the grave

After the burial service, Yeltsin's coffin was closed and carried outside into a hearse which was then escorted through the Novodevichy streets by motorcyclists. Officers draped with the national flag on the hearse and placed it on a gun carriage, whereby it was drawn to the cemetery gates by an armored personnel carrier. From there, the funeral procession continued with the gun carriage being manoeuvred on foot. Yeltsin's coffin was removed and carried by eight officers, with a bell of the Novodevichy Convent. The procession continued to the central avenue to where the grave was, with a small hearse in front of it. The flag was taken from the coffin and handed over to Sergey Sobyanin, who in its turn gave it to Naina Yeltsina.

The coffin was taken down and opened again. Metropolitan Juvenal called Yeltsin's family to approach the body one last time, first Yelena Okulova, then Tatyana Dyachenko, and finally, widow Naina Yeltsina. After that a final memorial was performed by Mn. Juvenal, with Mns. Kirill and Kliment assisting, while "Eternal Memory" was sung by a female chorus from the Novodevichy Convent. Metropolitan Juvenal then put a small wreath on Yeltsin's brow. By about 16:30, the coffin was closed, adorned with flowers and lowered into the grave. An artillery salute of three volleys rang out and a military band played the Russian anthem.

Afterwards, at the reception in the Kremlin, Vladimir Putin gave his only speech.

== Participants ==
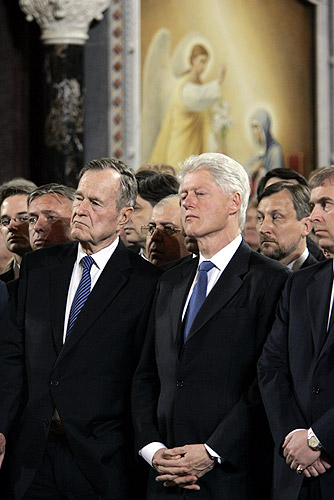
Former US Presidents George H. W. Bush and Bill Clinton

The ceremony was attended by more than thirty foreign visitors. These were the heads of state and government and other representatives of various countries, as well as many former heads of state and government, who had worked with Boris Yeltsin.

A total of 12 foreign leaders, 16 former leaders, 4 governmental delegates and 3 multilateral leaders attended the funeral. In total, 50 countries and 3 organizations was represented.

Country	Dignitaries
Armenia	President Robert Kocharyan
Azerbaijan	Prime Minister Artur Rasizade
Belarus	President Alexander Lukashenko; Former Chairman of the Supreme Soviet Stanislav Shushkevich
Bulgaria	Former President Zhelyu Zhelev
Canada	Former Prime Minister Jean Chrétien
Estonia	President Toomas Hendrik Ilves
Finland	Former President Mauno Koivisto
France	Minister of Foreign Affairs Philippe Douste-Blazy
Georgia	Chairman of Parliament Nino Burjanadze
Germany	President Horst Köhler; Former Chancellor Helmut Kohl; Former Chancellor Gerhard Schröder
Greece	Former President Konstantinos Stephanopoulos
Hungary	Former Prime Minister Péter Medgyessy
India	Ambassador to Russia Kanwal Sibal
Italy	Former Prime Minister Giulio Andreotti
Kazakhstan	President Nursultan Nazarbayev
Kyrgyzstan	Prime Minister Almazbek Atambayev; Former President Askar Akayev
Latvia	President Vaira Vīķe-Freiberga; Former President Guntis Ulmanis
Lithuania	President Valdas Adamkus; Former President Algirdas Brazauskas
Malta	Former President Guido de Marco
Poland	Former President Lech Wałęsa
Serbia	Minister of Internal Affairs Dragan Jočić; Minister of Science and Environmental Protection Aleksandar Popović
Spain	Chairman of the Constitutional Court María Emilia Casas
Sweden	Minister of Foreign Affairs, former Prime Minister Carl Bildt
Tajikistan	Prime Minister Oqil Oqilov
Turkey	Minister of State Mehmet Aydın
Turkmenistan	President Gurbanguly Berdimuhamedow
Ukraine	Former President Leonid Kravchuk; Former President Leonid Kuchma; Prime Minister Viktor Yanukovych
United Kingdom	Former Prime Minister John Major; Andrew Mountbatten-Windsor
United States	Former President George H. W. Bush; Former President Bill Clinton
Uzbekistan	President Islam Karimov
European Union	European Commissioner for External Relations Benita Ferrero-Waldner
CIS	General Secretary Sergei Lebedev

In addition to foreign leaders, many Russian politicians attended the funeral.

Representatives
President	Vladimir Putin
Prime Minister	Mikhail Fradkov
First Deputy Prime Minister	Dmitry Medvedev
First Deputy Prime Minister	Sergei Ivanov
Chairman of the Federation Council	Sergey Mironov
Chairman of the State Duma	Boris Gryzlov
Ministry of Economic Development	Herman Gref
President of the Republic of Bashkortostan	Murtaza Rakhimov
Prime Minister of Republic of Karelia	Pavel Chernov
Governor of Krasnoyarsk Krai	Alexander Khloponin
Governor of Irkutsk Oblast	Alexander Tishanin
Governor of Sverdlovsk Oblast	Eduard Rossel
Governor of Moscow Oblast	Boris Gromov
Governor of Saint Petersburg	Valentina Matviyenko
Mayor of Moscow	Yury Luzhkov
Former Prime Minister	Viktor Chernomyrdin
Former President of the Soviet Union & General Secretary of CPSU	Mikhail Gorbachev
Chief of Staff of the Presidential Executive Office	Sergey Sobyanin

== Gallery ==
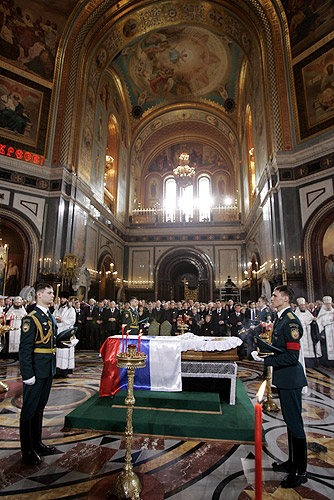
Coffin with the body of Boris Yeltsin in the Cathedral of Christ the Savior

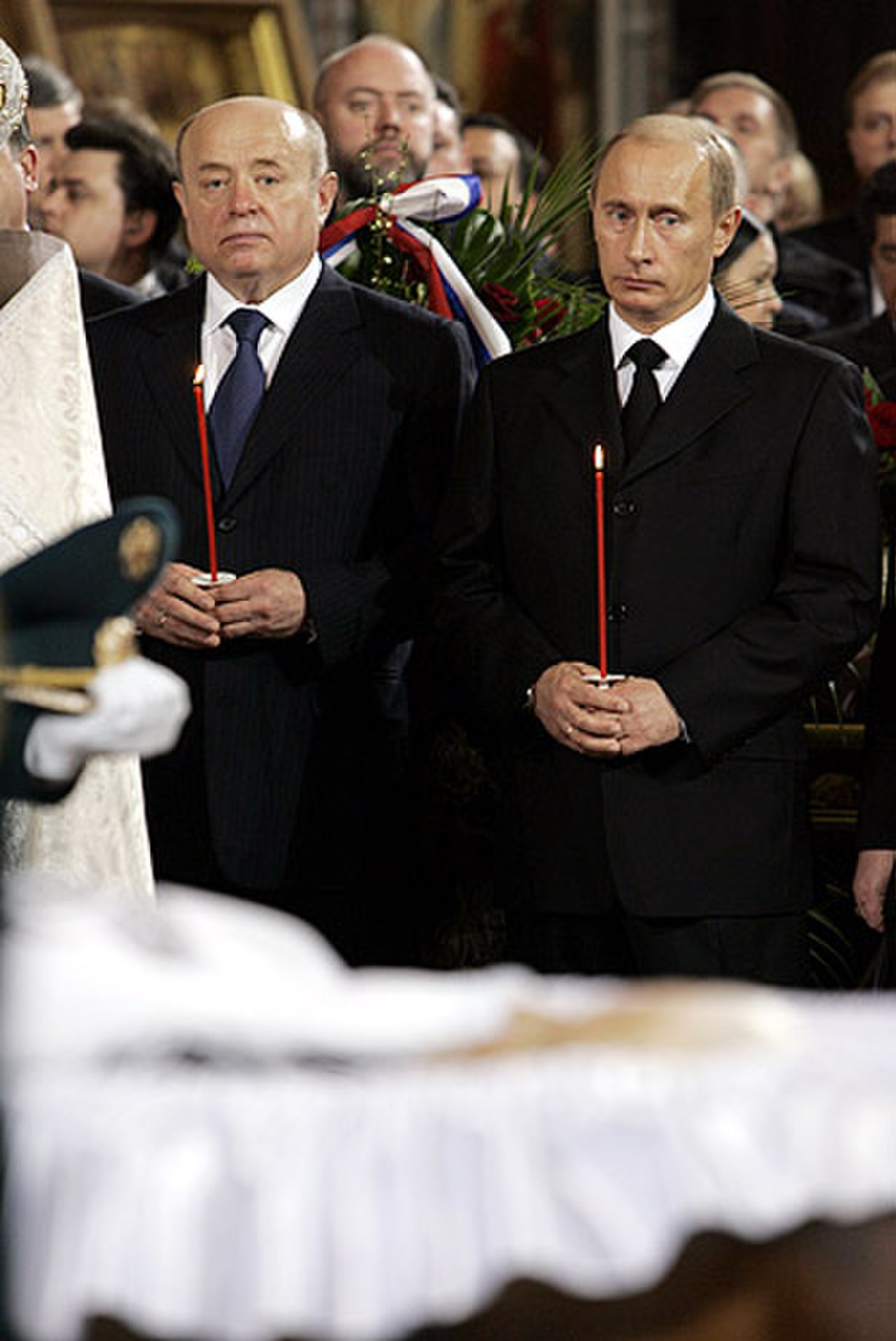
Prime Minister Fradkov and President Putin

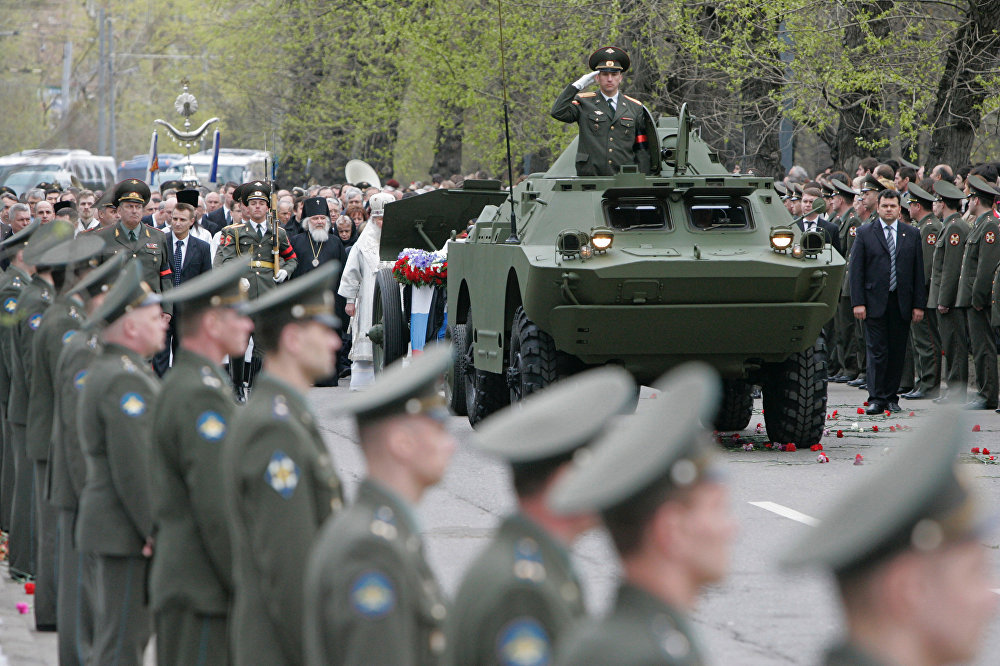
Yeltsin's coffin being taken to the cemetery

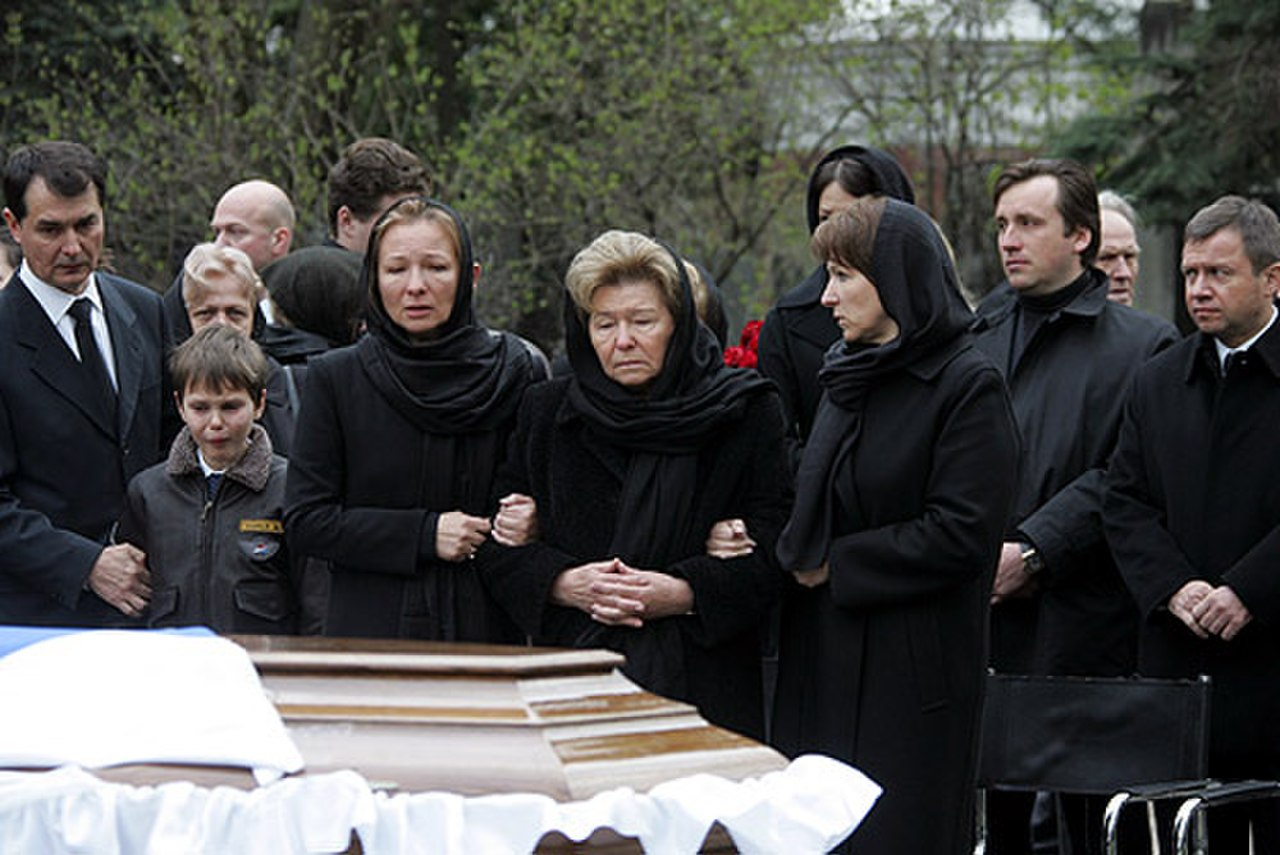
Yeltsin family

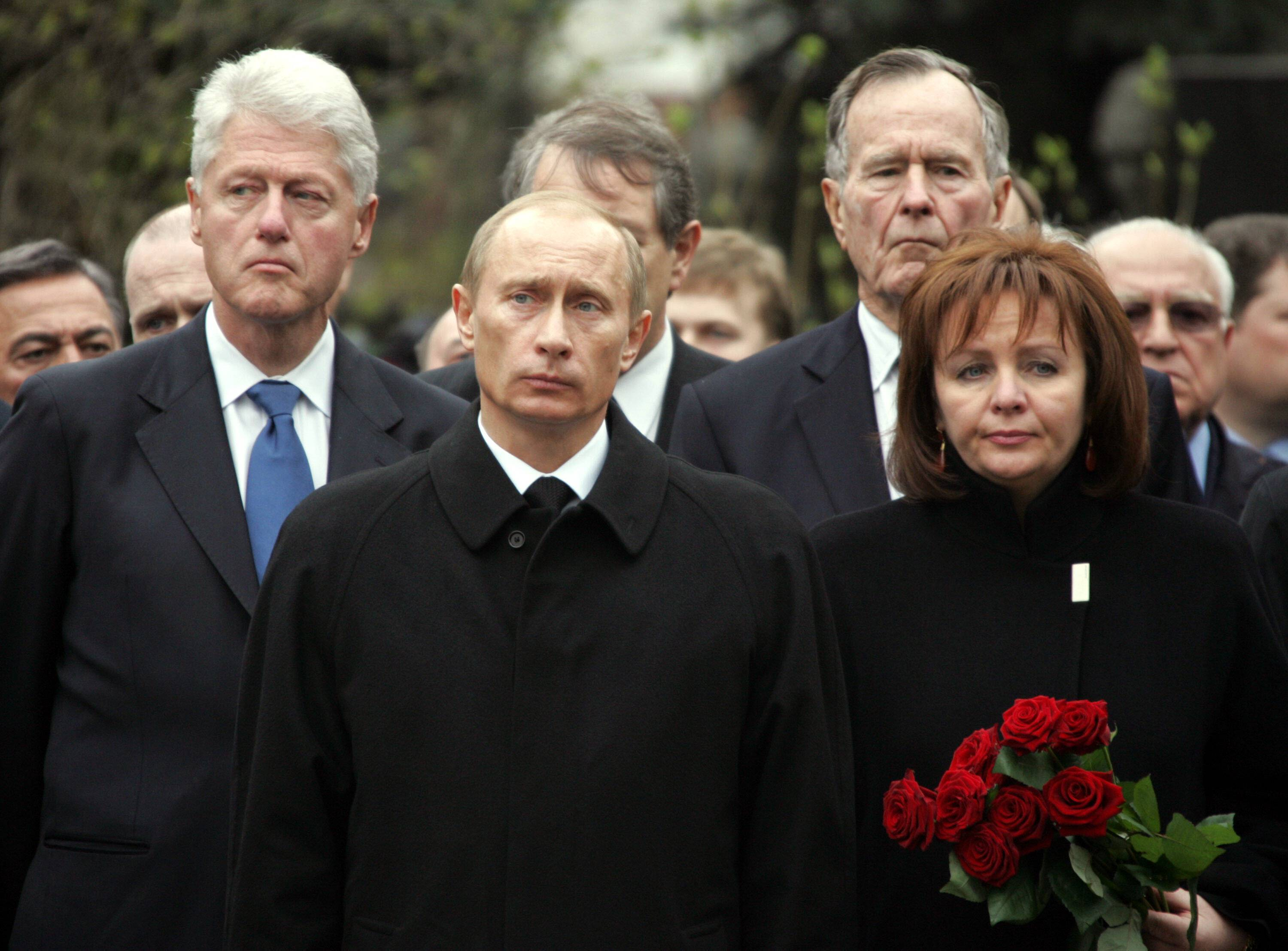
Bill Clinton, Vladimir Putin, wife Ludmila Putina and George H. W. Bush

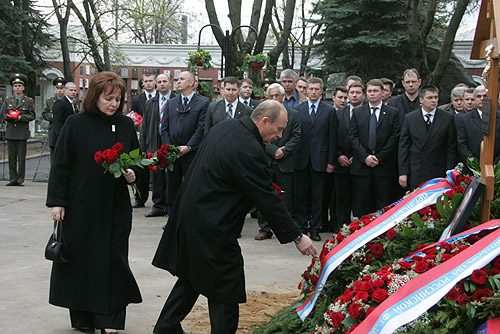
Vladimir Putin and his wife laying flowers on the grave

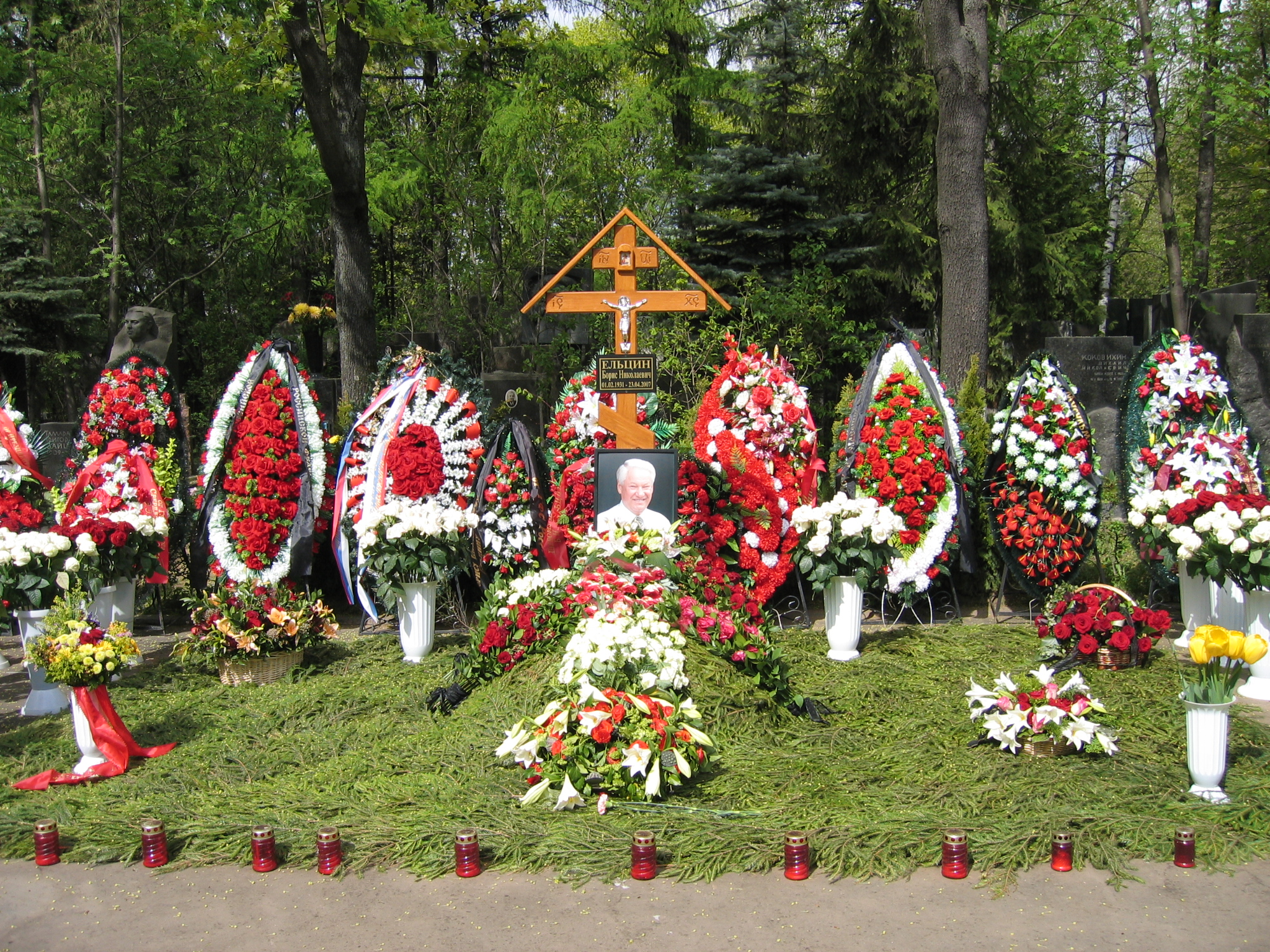
Grave before installing the tombstone

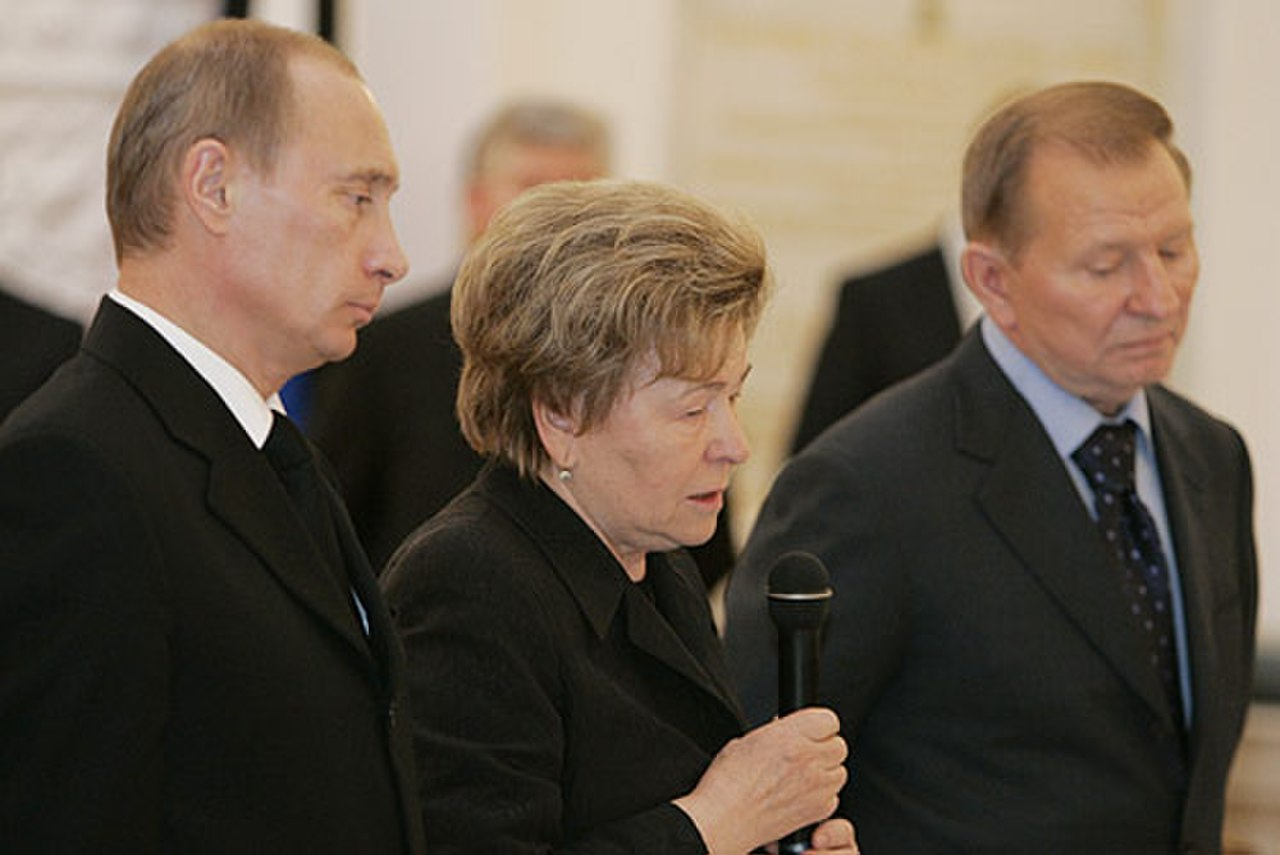
Vladimir Putin, Naina Yeltsina and Leonid Kuchma

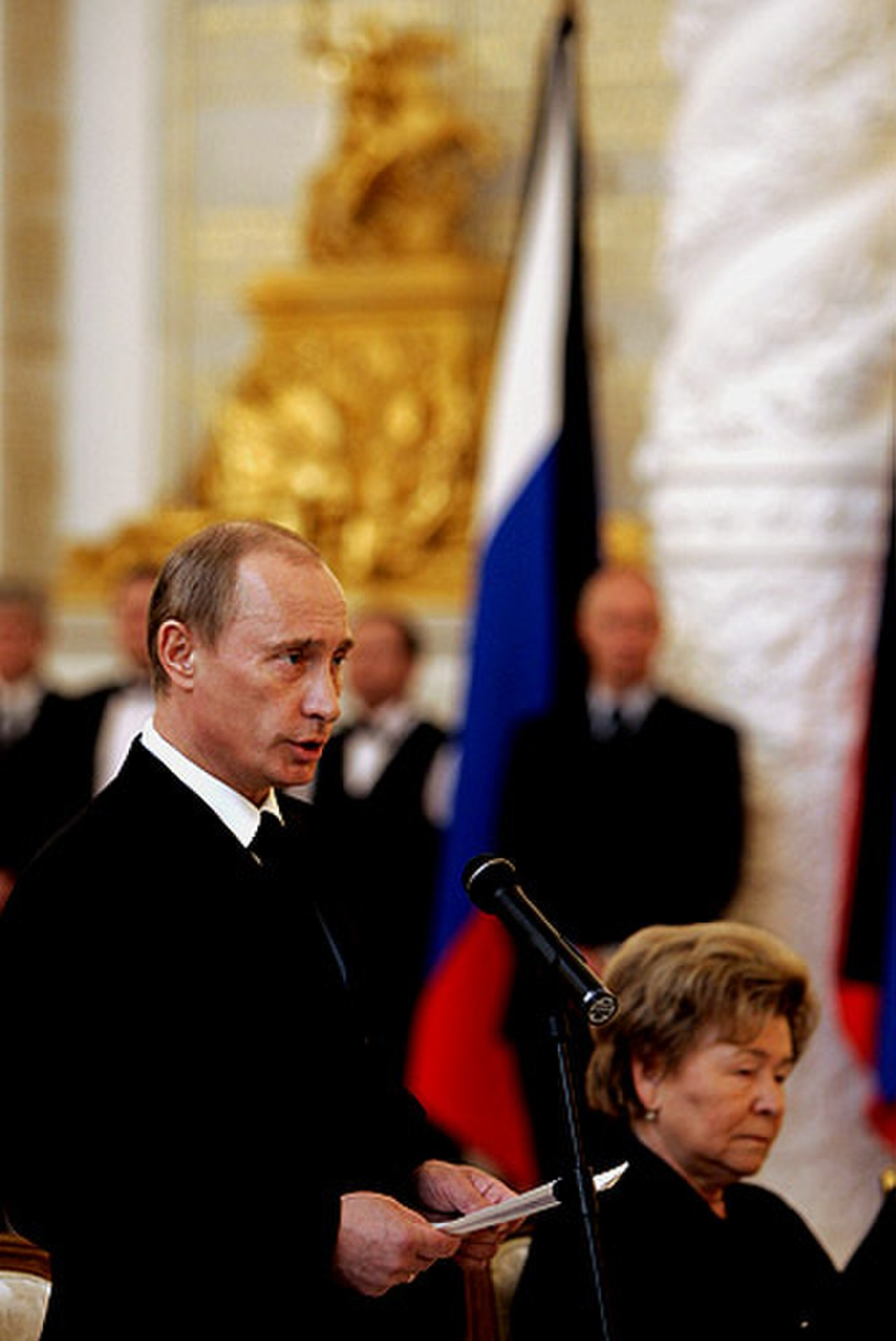
Vladimir Putin delivers a speech.

== Memorials ==
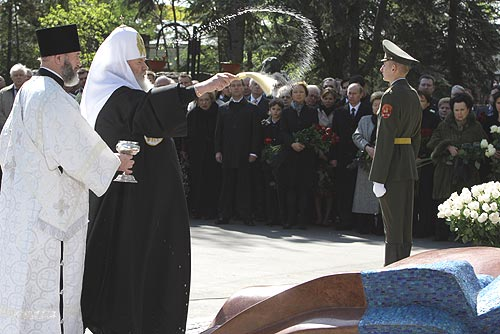
Unveiling Boris Yeltsin's gravestone memorial

Yeltsin was memorialised in several ways in 2008. On 8 April, a street in Yekaterinburg, formerly 9 January Street, was renamed "Boris Yeltsin Street". On 23 April, a grand opening ceremony at Novodevichy Cemetery was held for the monument to Boris Yeltsin, made by sculptor Georgy Frangulyan. The memorial is a broad headstone, made in the colors of the Russian flag – a white marble, blue Byzantine mosaics and red porphyry. On the pavement under the tricolor is an engraved Orthodox cross. The ceremony was attended by Yeltsin's family, including his widow, Naina, Russian President Vladimir Putin, the president-elect Dmitry Medvedev, Prime Minister Viktor Zubkov, Chief of Staff of the Presidential Executive Office Sergey Sobyanin, government members, friends, colleagues and others who worked with Yelstin. On the same day, the name of the Ural State Technical University was changed to include "Boris Yeltsin".

On 25 January 2015, the Boris Yeltsin Presidential Center opened in Yekaterinburg.

== See also ==
- Death and state funeral of Vladimir Lenin
- Death and state funeral of Joseph Stalin
- Death and state funeral of Leonid Brezhnev
- Death and funeral of Mikhail Gorbachev
