= First Lady of Russia =

Wife of the president of Russia

First Lady of the Russian Federation
- Первая леди Российской Федерации
- Incumbent; Vacant since 2 April 2014
- Abbreviation: FLOR
- Residence: Terem Palace
- Inaugural holder: Naina Yeltsina
- Formation: 10 July 1991
- Website: президент.рф (in Russian) eng.kremlin.ru (in English)

First Lady of the Russian Federation (Russian: Первая леди Российской Федерации, romanized: Pervaya ledi Rossiyskoy Federatsii) is the unofficial title given to the wife of the president of Russia. The post is highly ceremonial. The first lady position is currently vacant, since the divorce of the current president Vladimir Putin and Lyudmila Putina in 2014.

== First ladies of Russia ==
Denotes spouses of acting presidents

| No. | Portrait | Name | Marriage | Period | | President |
|---|---|---|---|---|---|---|
| 1 | | Naina Yeltsina (née Girina); Born: 14 March 1932 (age 94) | 28 September 1956 | 10 July 1991 | 31 December 1999 | Boris Yeltsin |
| 2 | | Lyudmila Putina (née Shkrebneva); Born: 6 January 1958 (age 68) | 28 July 1983 | 31 December 1999 | 7 May 2000 | Vladimir Putin (Acting) |
| 2 | | Lyudmila Putina (née Shkrebneva); Born: 6 January 1958 (age 68) | 28 July 1983 | 7 May 2000 | 7 May 2008 | Vladimir Putin |
| 3 | | Svetlana Medvedeva (née Linnik); Born: 15 March 1965 (age 61) | 24 December 1993 | 7 May 2008 | 7 May 2012 | Dmitry Medvedev |
| 4 | | Lyudmila Putina (née Shkrebneva); Born: 6 January 1958 (age 68) | 28 July 1983 | 7 May 2012 | 2 April 2014; Suspended: 6 June 2013 – 2 April 2014 | Vladimir Putin |
| – | Vacant; Vladimir Putin and Lyudmila Ocheretnaya are now divorced. | | | 2 April 2014 | Present | Vladimir Putin |

== See also ==
- First Lady
- Russia
- List of presidents of Russia
