= Naina Yeltsina =

Wife of Boris Yeltsin (born 1932)

- Наина Ельцина
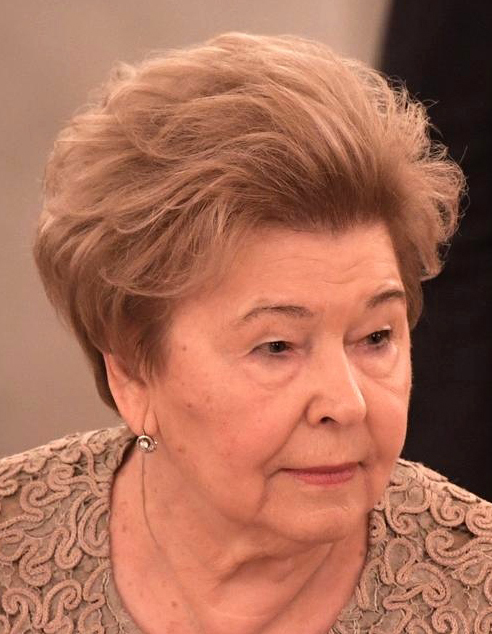
- Yeltsina in 2017

First Lady of Russia
- In role 10 July 1991 – 31 December 1999
- President: Boris Yeltsin
- Preceded by: Post established
- Succeeded by: Lyudmila Putina

Personal details
- Born: Anastasia Iosifovna Girina; 14 March 1932 (age 94) Orenburg Oblast, Russian SFSR, Soviet Union
- Spouse: Boris Yeltsin (m. 1956; died 2007)
- Children: 2, including Tatyana

Anastasia Iosifovna "Naina" Yeltsina (Russian: Анастасия Иосифовна "Наина" Ельцина; née Girina [Гирина]; born 14 March 1932) is a Russian civil engineer and the widow of the first President of Russia, Boris Yeltsin. She was the First Lady of Russia during her husband's presidency (1991–1999).

== Early life and education ==
Naina Yeltsina was born in the Orenburg Oblast in 1932. After graduating from the construction faculty at the Ural Polytechnic Institute in Sverdlovsk (now Yekaterinburg) in 1955, she worked with various projects at the Sverdlovsk Institute.

== Personal life ==
In 1956, she married Boris Yeltsin, whom she met at the Sverdlovsk institute, and has lived in Moscow since 1985. They have two daughters, Yelena and Tatyana, born in 1957 and 1960, respectively.

== First lady ==
Naina Yeltsina was rarely seen in public. She accompanied her husband on some of his foreign visits including 1997 visits to Sweden and Finland and a 1999 visit to China. As a rule, Naina Yeltsina never interfered in her husband's political work; however, in the 1996 election campaign, she met with voters and gave interviews to the media. She made a major public appearance in April 2007 at her husband's state funeral in Moscow.

== Later life ==
In 2017, Naina Yeltsina launched her autobiography at both the Yeltsin Center and then in Moscow.

Honorary titles
New title	First Lady of Russia; 1991-1999	Succeeded by Lyudmila Putina
