= Lyudmila Putina =

Ex-wife of Vladimir Putin (born 1958)

Lyudmila Aleksandrovna Ocheretnaya
- Людмила Александровна Очеретная
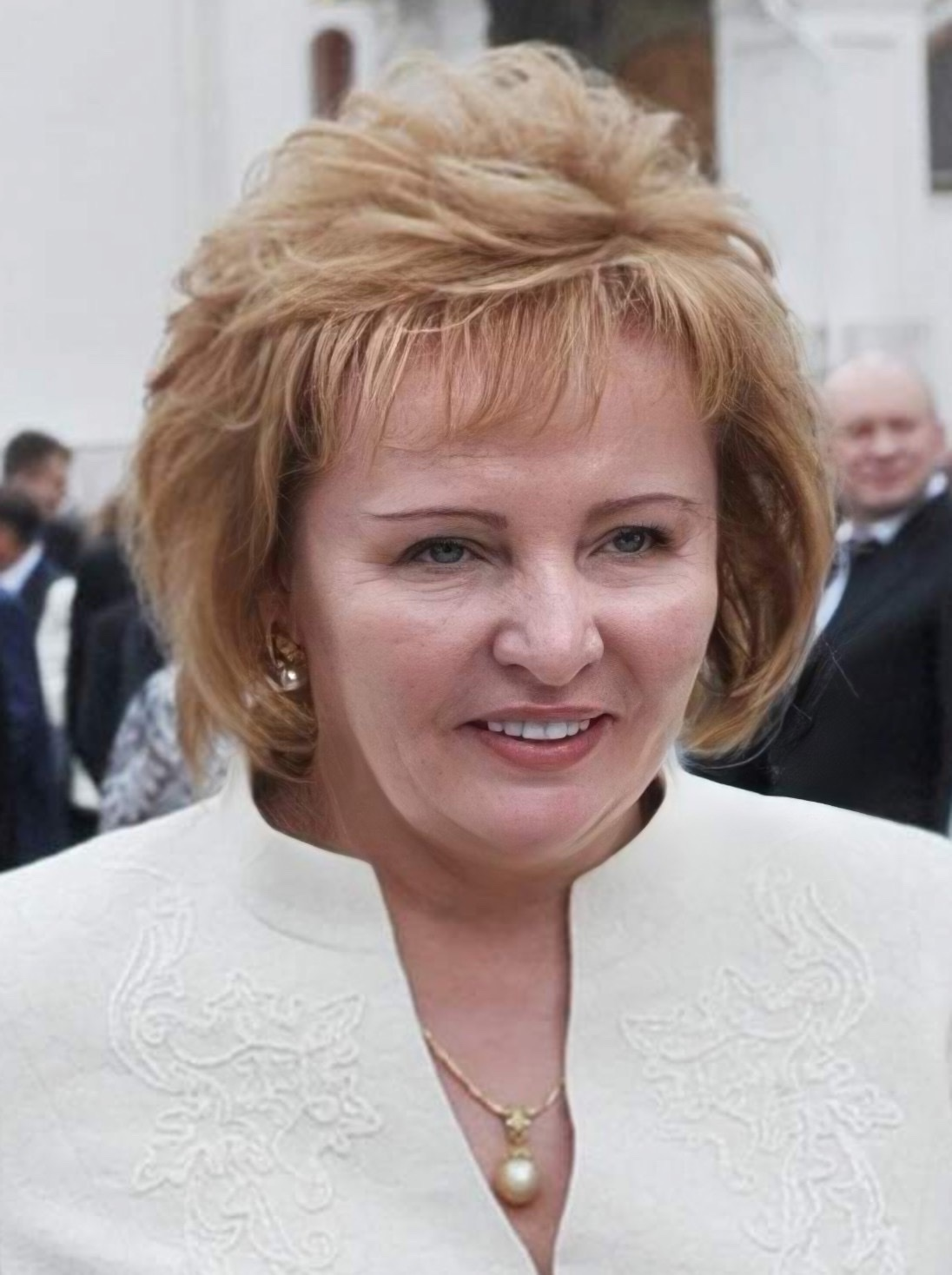
- Ocheretnaya in 2012

First Lady of Russia
- In role 7 May 2012 – 2 April 2014; Suspended: 6 June 2013 – 2 April 2014
- President: Vladimir Putin
- Preceded by: Svetlana Medvedeva
- Succeeded by: Vacant
- In role 7 May 2000 – 7 May 2008; Acting: 31 December 1999 – 7 May 2000
- President: Vladimir Putin
- Preceded by: Naina Yeltsina
- Succeeded by: Svetlana Medvedeva

Spouse of the Prime Minister of Russia
- In role 8 May 2008 – 7 May 2012
- Prime Minister: Vladimir Putin
- Preceded by: Zoe Zubkova
- Succeeded by: Zoe Zubkova (acting); Svetlana Medvedeva
- In role 9 August 1999 – 7 May 2000
- Prime Minister: Vladimir Putin
- Preceded by: Tamara Stepashina
- Succeeded by: Irina Kasyanova

Personal details
- Born: Lyudmila Aleksandrovna Shkrebneva; 6 January 1958 (age 68) Kaliningrad, Soviet Union
- Spouse: Vladimir Putin (m. 1983; div. 2014) Artur Ocheretny (m. 2015)
- Children: Maria; Katerina
- Education: Leningrad State University

Lyudmila Aleksandrovna Ocheretnaya (Note: In this name that follows East Slavic naming customs, the patronymic is Aleksandrovna and the family name is Ocheretnaya.) (Note: Russian: Людмила Александровна Очеретная, IPA: [lʲʊdˈmʲilə ɐlʲɪkˈsandrəvnə ɐtɕɪˈrʲetnəjə].) (formerly Putina; (Note: Russian: Путина, IPA: [ˈputʲɪnə].) née Shkrebneva; (Note: Russian: Шкребнева, IPA: [ˈʂkrʲebnʲɪvə].) born 6 January 1958) is a Russian linguist who served as the First Lady of Russia from 2000 to 2008 and from 2012 to 2014, while married to her then-husband, Vladimir Putin, the current president and former prime minister of Russia.

== Early life and education ==
Lyudmila was born in Kaliningrad, as the daughter of Alexander (his patronym is reported variously as either Abramovich or Avramovich) Shkrebnev and Yekaterina Tikhonovna Shkrebneva. Her father worked at Kaliningrad Mechanical Plant.

She was educated as a linguist. In 1986, Lyudmila graduated from the branch of Spanish language and philology of the Department of Philology of Leningrad State University.

== Later life and marriage ==
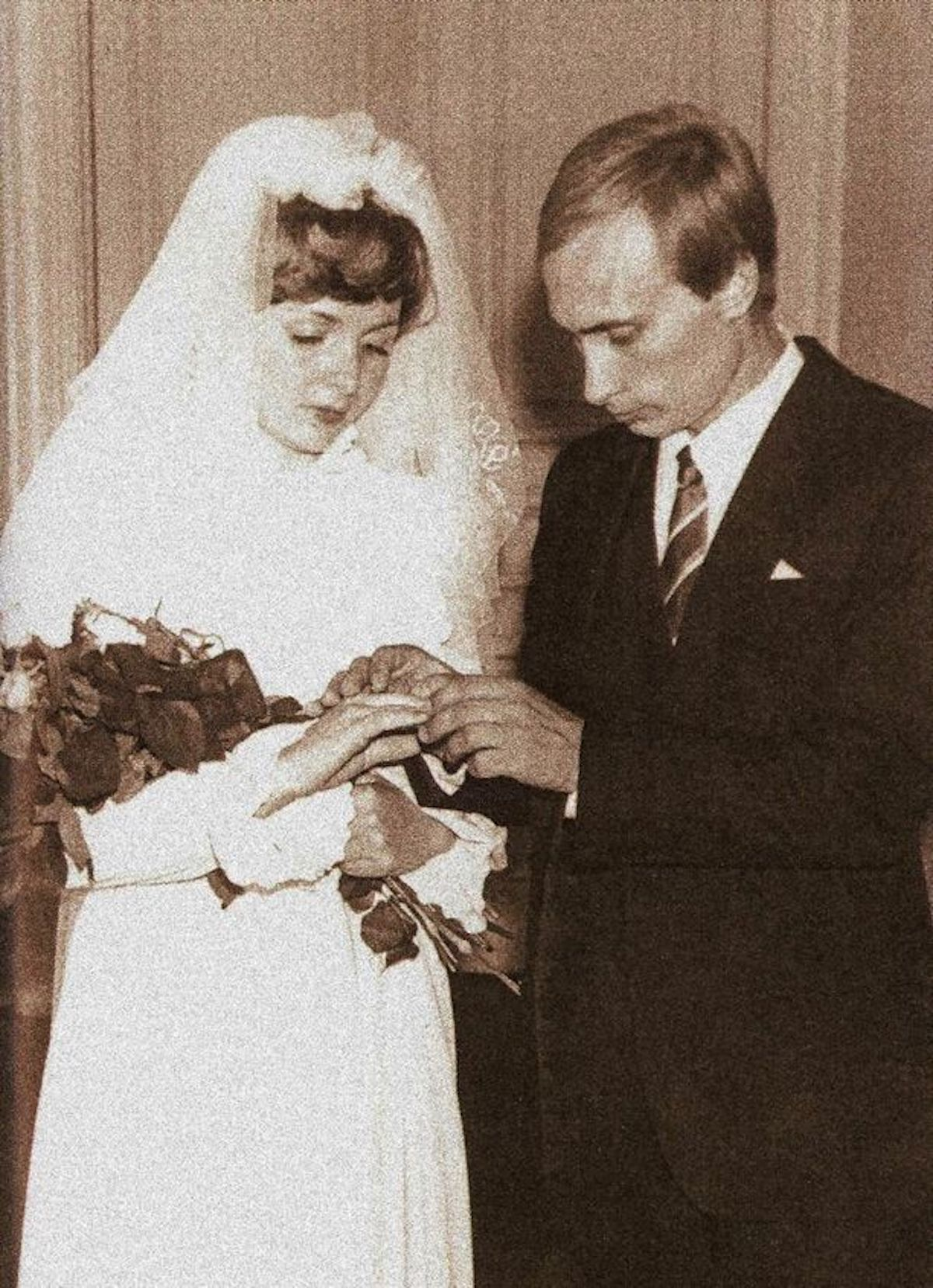
Lyudmila and Vladimir Putin during their wedding on 28 July 1983

In her early adult years, Lyudmila was a flight attendant for the Kaliningrad branch of Aeroflot. She met Vladimir Putin at an Arkady Raikin concert in Leningrad, and they married on 28 July 1983. The couple has two daughters, Maria (born on 28 April 1985 in Leningrad, Soviet Union) and Katerina (born on 31 August 1986 in Dresden, East Germany).

From 1990 to 1994, Lyudmila taught German at the Department of Philology of Leningrad State University. For a few years prior to Vladimir's appointment as Prime Minister of Russia in August 1999, she was a Moscow representative of the company Telecominvest from 1998 to 1999 where she, as the only employee in the Moscow office, answered phone calls and organized meetings. (Note: After Telecominvest was founded in 1994, Leonid Reiman was vice president of Telecominvest and two weeks after Vladimir Putin became prime minister in August 1999, Reiman became secretary of state - first deputy chairman of the Russian Federation state committee for telecommunications (Russian: статс-секретарем – первым заместителем председателя Госкомитета РФ по телекоммуникациям) and a few months later Reiman was minister. In 2004, both Jeffrey Galmond and Anthony Georgiou stated that the 51% stake held since 1995 by the Luxembourg registered firm First National Holding which was established through Commerzbank was beneficial to Reiman through the 1997 founded Liechtenstein firm Fiduciare Commerce Trust. In February 2000, the Swedish firm Telia obtained a 30% stake in First National Holding from Commerzbank.)

== First Lady ==
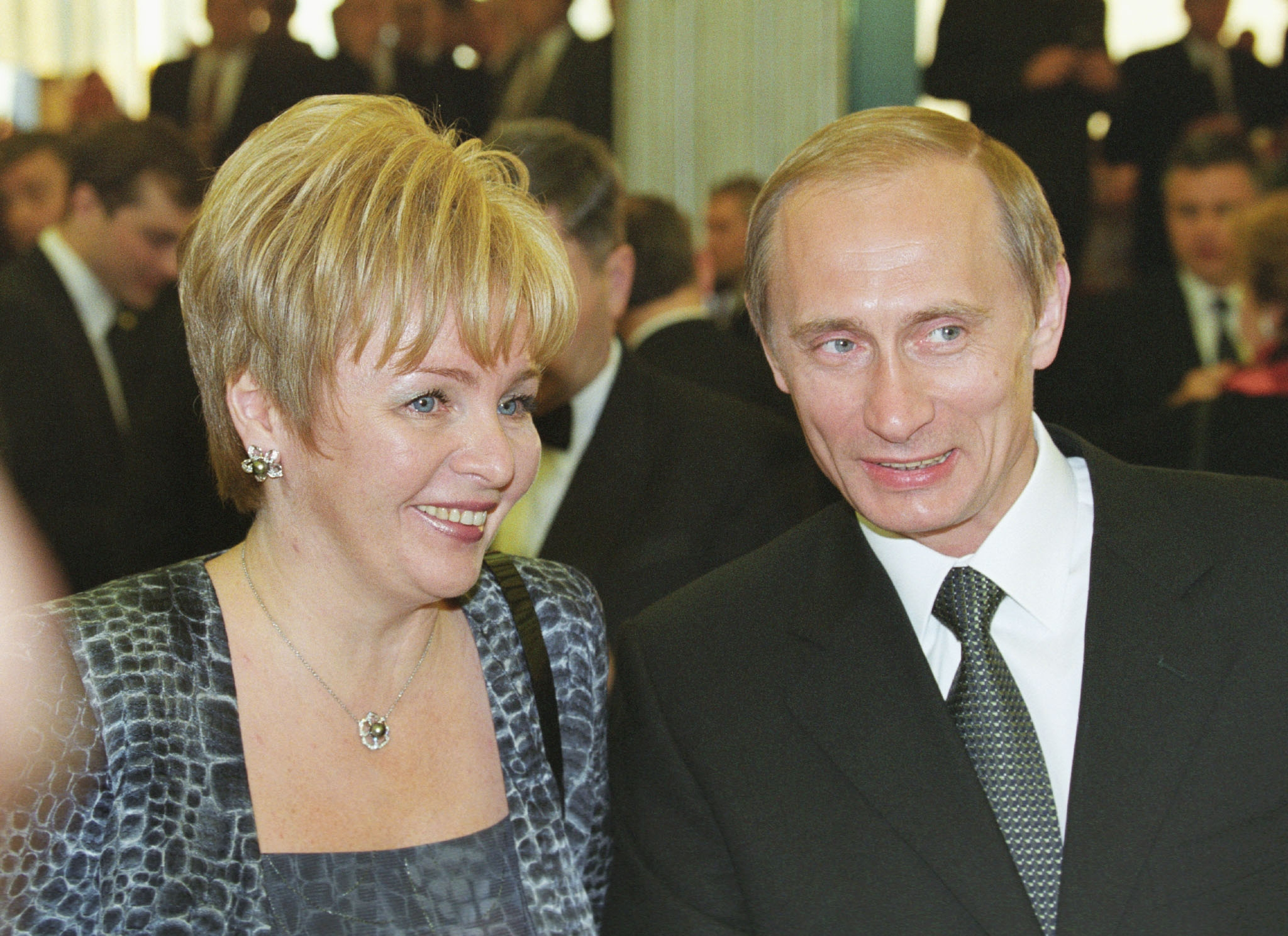
Lyudmila with Vladimir Putin after his inauguration on 7 May 2000

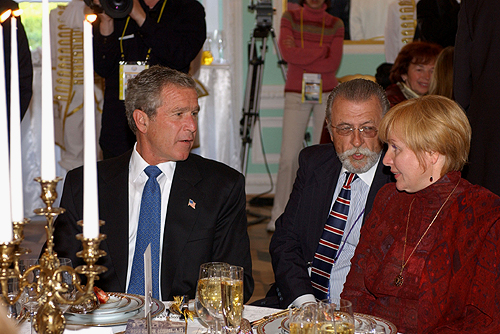
US President George W. Bush and Lyudmila at an official dinner in honour of the heads of state and their spouses, who arrived in St. Petersburg to mark the city's 300th anniversary in 2003

After Vladimir's rise to political power, Lyudmila maintained a low profile on the Russian political stage, generally avoiding the limelight except as required by protocol and restricting her public role to supportive statements about her husband.

As First Lady, Lyudmila Putina was a curator of a fund that aimed to develop the Russian language and sometimes produced statements concerning Russian language and education. Her preference for "maintaining and preserving" the Russian language led her to make public statements against orthographic reform. The Russian Academy of Science sponsored a commission to study the orthography of the Russian language and propose changes. Their recommendations were made public in 2002 after eight years of work, but were subsequently rejected by Putina, who used Russia's burgeoning economy as one of her reasons why the orthographic reform was not just unnecessary but untimely. However, although one newspaper in Moscow alleged that "Lyudmila Putina de facto cancelled any attempts to reform spelling", the fact remains that public and academic reaction to the reforms was sufficiently negative to have that particular reform attempt abandoned.

== Divorce and remarriage ==
On 6 June 2013, she and Putin publicly announced the termination of their marriage based on a mutual decision. The divorce announcement was made on camera for the Russian news media at the State Kremlin Palace during the intermission of a performance by the Kremlin Ballet, ending years of speculation about their relationship. In April 2014, the Kremlin confirmed that their divorce had been finalized.

In January 2016, a number of media outlets reported that Lyudmila married Artur Ocheretny in early 2015. In documents on the ownership of her former St. Petersburg apartment, she was referred to as Lyudmila Aleksandrovna Ocheretnaya.

== Property and business ==
According to Reuters, Lyudmila helped create and supports the foundation called the Centre for the Development of Inter-personal Communications (CDIC) which generates millions of dollars. The CDIC's offices are located in the center of Moscow, on Vozdvizhenka Street in the building previously known as Volkonsky House, which is its own property. The building, which once belonged to Leo Tolstoy's grandfather, was listed in Russian cultural heritage register but was completely rebuilt in 2013, raising its height from two stories to four, despite numerous objections and protests by Moscow citizens including an unanswered appeal to Vladimir Putin signed by 200 famous science and cultural persons of the city.

The building is mainly occupied by commercial tenants, including VTB Bank, Sberbank, a construction company called Severstroygroup, a sushi restaurant, and a Burger King. Total rent from the building is about $3–4 million.

Tenants pay their rent to a company known as Meridian, which is in turn owned by a company known as Intererservis, which is wholly owned by Lyudmila. Her sister, Olga Alexandrovna Tsomayeva, was previously General Director of Intererservis. Artur Ocheretny, Lyudmila's second husband, chairs the CDIC's management board.

== Sanctions ==
Following the Russian invasion of Ukraine, Lyudmila was sanctioned by the United Kingdom on 13 May 2022. The Foreign, Commonwealth and Development Office stated that Lyudmila has "benefited from preferential business relationships with state-owned entities".

== Honours and medals ==
National

- Laureate of the "Persons of the Year 2002" contest by Komsomolskaya Pravda in the category of "Educator of the Year" (2002)
- Honorary Citizen of Kaliningrad (2007)

Foreign

- Germany: Laureate of the Jacob Grimm Prize (2002)
- Kyrgyzstan: Laureate of the "Rukhaniyat" prize of the International Association for the Rebirth of Spirituality (2002)
- Kazakhstan:
  - Honorary Professor of the Eurasian National University named after Gumilev (2005)
  - Golden Warrior medal (2005)

== Notes ==
Honorary titles
Preceded by Naina Yeltsina	First Lady of Russia; Acting: 1999–2000; 2000–2008	Succeeded by Svetlana Medvedeva
Preceded by Svetlana Medvedeva	First Lady of Russia; 2012–2014	Vacant
