= Pavlovo-Posadsky District =

Pavlovo-Posadsky District Павлово-Посадский район (Russian)
- District
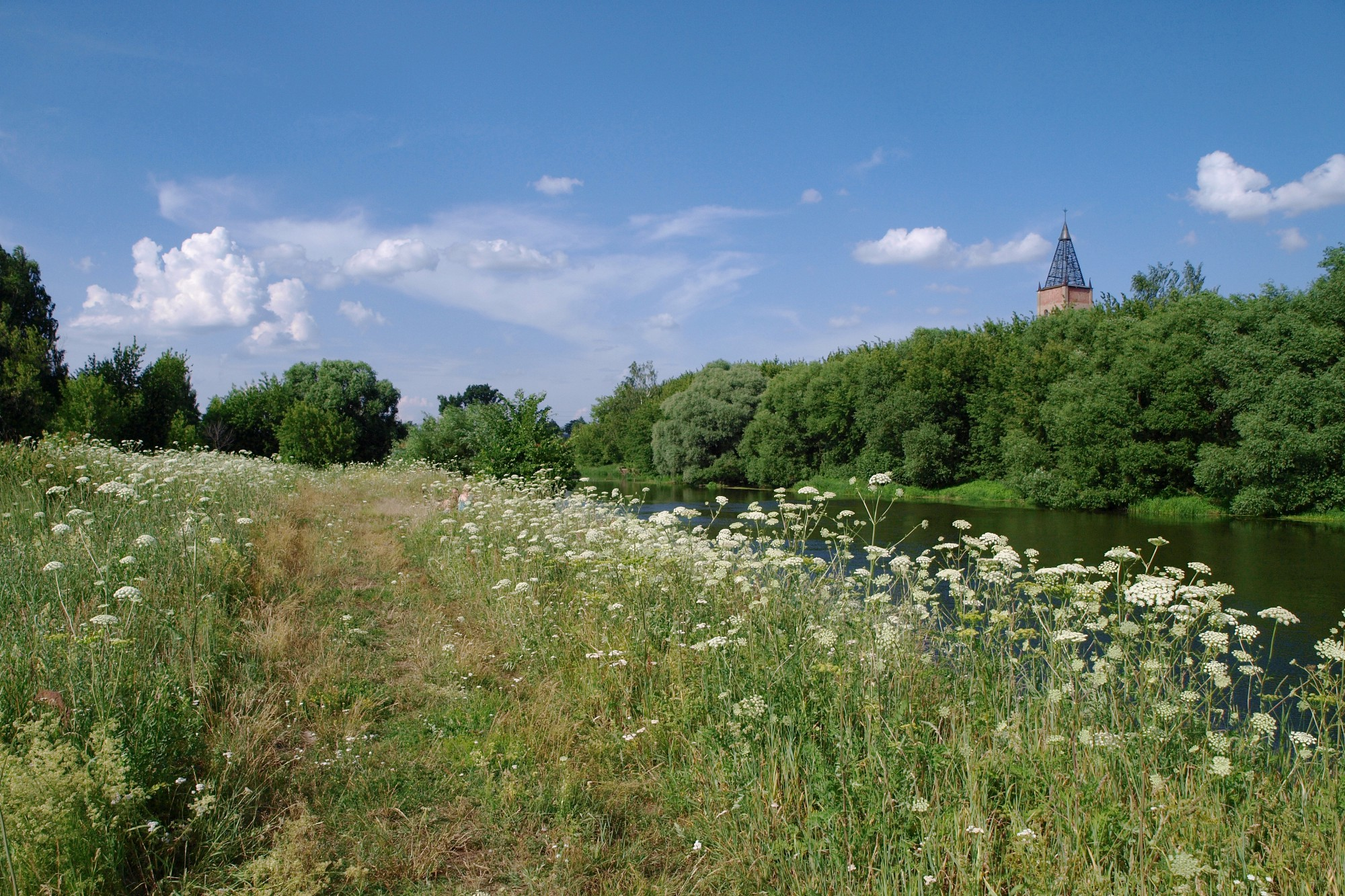
- View across the Klyazma River, Pavlovo-Posadsky District

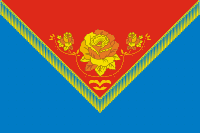
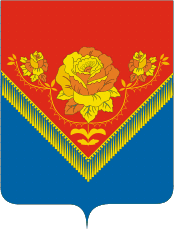
- Flag Coat of arms
- Location of Lukhovitsky District in Moscow Oblast (before July 2012)
- Coordinates: 55°47′N 38°39′E
- Country: Russia
- Federal subject: Moscow Oblast
- Established: 9 January 2023
- Administrative center: Pavlovsky Posad

Area
  - Total: 566.34 km^{2} (218.67 sq mi)

Population (2010 Census)
  - Total: 83,520
  - Density: 147.5/km^{2} (382.0/sq mi)
  - Urban: 82.2%
  - Rural: 17.8%

Administrative structure
  - Administrative divisions: 1 Towns, 1 Work settlements, 4 Rural settlements
  - Inhabited localities: 1 cities/towns, 1 urban-type settlements, 58 rural localities

Municipal structure
  - Municipally incorporated as: Pavlovo-Posadsky Municipal District
  - Municipal divisions: 2 urban settlements, 4 rural settlements
- Time zone: UTC+3 (MSK)
- OKTMO ID: 46759000
- Website: http://www.pavpos.ru/

Pavlovo-Posadsky District (Russian: Па́влово-Поса́дский райо́н) is an administrative and municipal district (raion), one of the thirty-six in Moscow Oblast, Russia. It is located in the east of the oblast. The area of the district is 566.34 square kilometers (218.67 sq mi). Its administrative center is the town of Pavlovsky Posad. Population: 83,520 (2010 Census); 102,311 (2002 census); 40,173 (1989 Soviet census). The population of Pavlovsky Posad accounts for 76.3% of the district's total population.
