= Pavlovo Posad shawl =

Traditional Russian shawl

The Pavlovo Posad shawl (Russian: Павловопосадский платок), Pavlovsky shawl or Povlovo Posad scarf is a traditional Russian garment and handicraft.

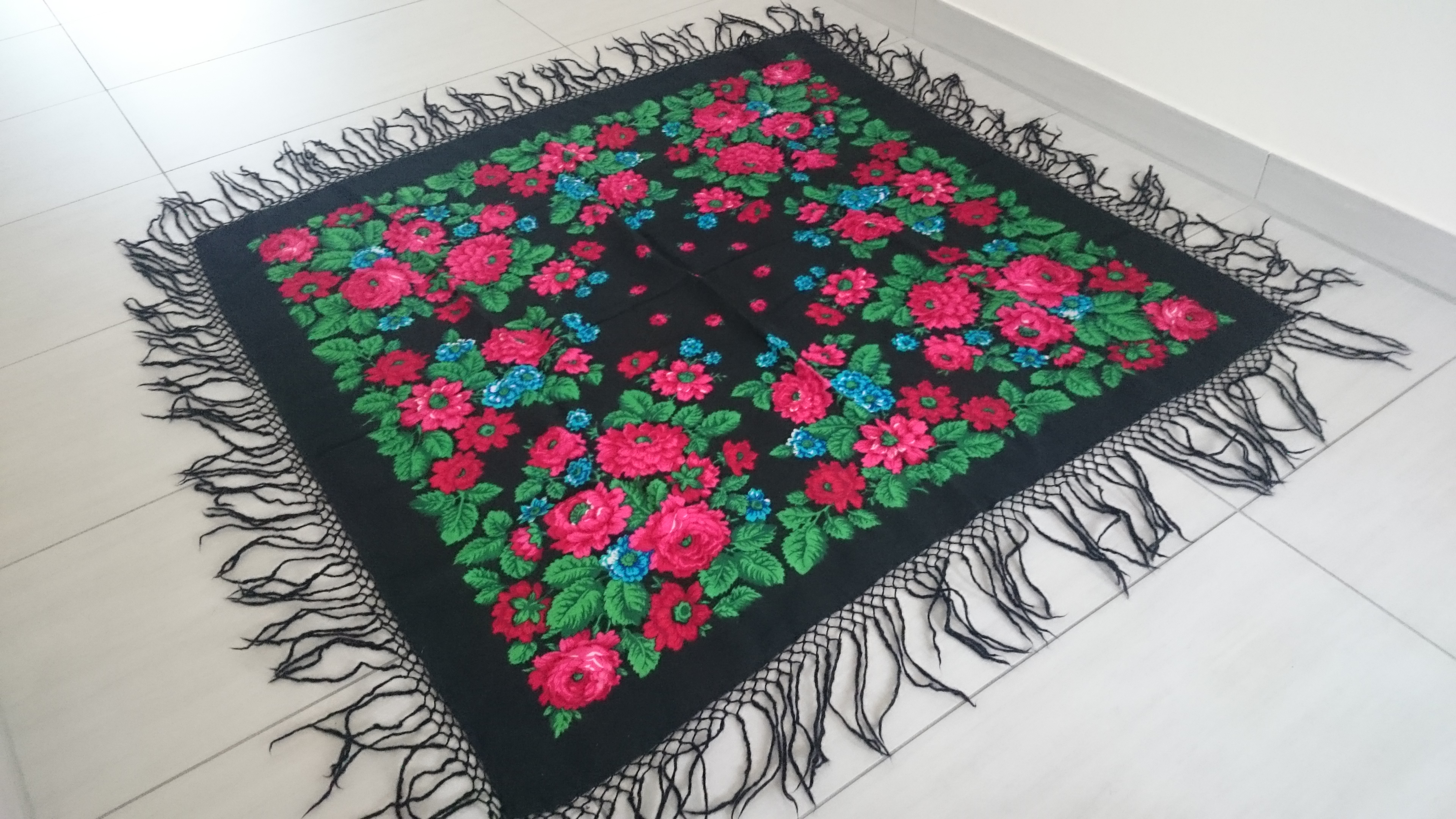
Pavlovo Posad shawl

In the beginning of the 19th century, it became fashionable to wear woolen shawls in Russia. The first shawls were produced in the small town Pavlovsky Posad in the Moscow Oblast in the middle of the 19th century. The basic tone of the woolen shawls is usually black while the composition of the motives is a mixture of large and small floral ornaments. Mostly roses are the motives on the scarfs.

The predominant color on the shawls has always been red, as this color means beautiful in Russian culture. Furthermore, Oriental and Turkish ornaments on the scarves had also been popular. The scarves are still enjoying a great popularity in Russia and its surrounding countries.
