= Svetlana Medvedeva =

Russian economist (born 1965)

- Светлана Медведева
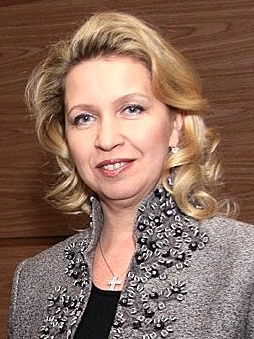
- Medvedeva in 2012

First Lady of Russia
- In role 7 May 2008 – 7 May 2012
- President: Dmitry Medvedev
- Preceded by: Lyudmila Putina
- Succeeded by: Lyudmila Putina

Personal details
- Born: Svetlana Vladimirovna Linnik; 15 March 1965 (age 61) Kronstadt, Leningrad, Russian SFSR, Soviet Union (now Kronstadt, Saint Petersburg, Russia)
- Spouse: Dmitry Medvedev (m. 1993)
- Children: 1
- Education: Saint Petersburg State University of Economics and Finance
- Profession: Economist

Svetlana Vladimirovna Medvedeva (Russian: Светлана Владимировна Медведева, pronounced [svʲɪˈtlanə vlɐˈdʲimʲɪrəvnə mʲɪdˈvʲedʲɪvə]; née Linnik [Линник]; born 15 March 1965) is a Russian economist who was the First Lady of Russia from 2008 to 2012, as the wife of the then president and former prime minister Dmitry Medvedev.

== Early life and education ==
Svetlana Linnik was born into a military family in Kronstadt, a town administered by Leningrad on 15 March 1965. Medvedeva was the youngest child in her family.

Medvedeva was active in extracurricular activities in school, and took an active part in school-held KVNs, spectacles, performances and other events. Medvedeva met her future husband in Middle School #305, in Kupchino, near Leningrad.

In 1987, Medvedeva began studying at the Saint Petersburg State University of Economics and Finance. In her first year at the university, Medvedeva switched to taking evening courses and started working full-time.

== Political activity ==
After the couple moved to Moscow, Medvedeva directed several Russian-Italian initiatives, Sister cities Milan – Saint Petersburg and Venice – Saint Petersburg, which intended to develop tourism between these cities. In 2006, Medvedeva initiated the annual Russian Art Festival in Bari, Italy.

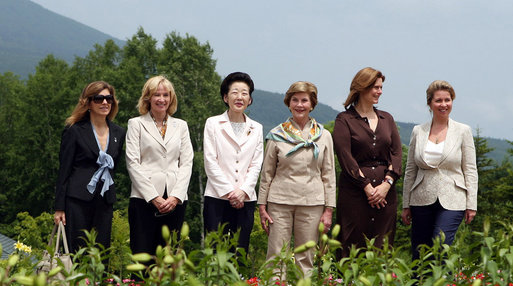
Svetlana Medvedeva at 34th G8 Summit

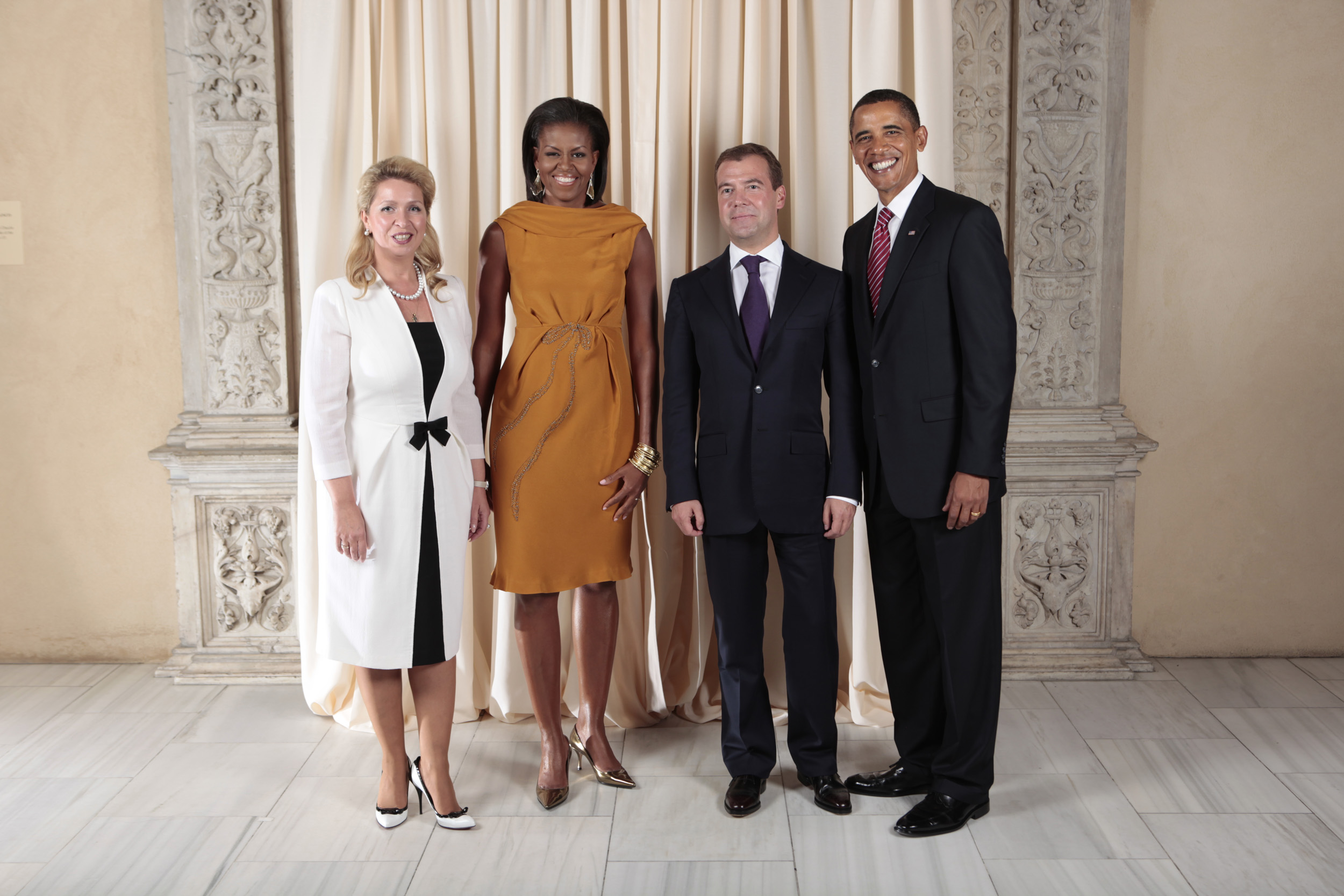
Svetlana and Dmitry Medvedevs with U.S. President Barack Obama and First Lady Michelle Obama at the Metropolitan Museum of Art in New York City, 2009

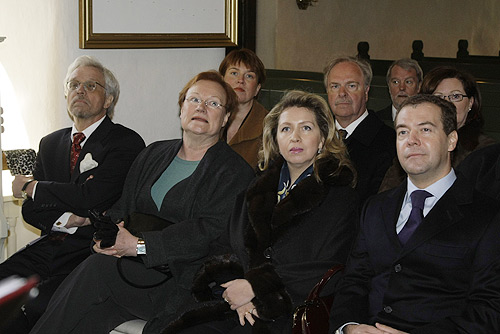
From right to left: Dmitry Medvedev, Svetlana Medvedeva, Finnish President Tarja Halonen and her husband Pentti Arajärvi at the Porvoo Cathedral in 2009

Medvedeva became First Lady when her husband, Dmitry Medvedev, took over as president following his victory in Russian Presidential elections on 7 May 2008. In the same year, Medvedeva headed the initiative for the institution of Family Day in Russia. Medvedeva has already caused something of a media frenzy, even though she shies away from photographers and rarely gives interviews. Medvedeva currently chairs the management council of multi-tier program Spiritual and moral culture of younger generation of Russia created with blessing of Alexy II of Moscow. In an interview, Medvedeva detailed her views on the interaction between the Russian Orthodox Church and the Government of Russia in promoting family policies. Medvedeva has taken up an anti-abortion cause in Russia's efforts to restrict abortion in 2011.

On 20 August 2010, Medvedeva visited the National Gallery and the History Museum of Armenia, along with visiting the Armenian First Lady, Rita Sargsyan. Together they admired the works of various painters, including Ivan Aivazovsky, Vardges Surenyants, Gevorg Bashinjaghyan, and Panos Terlemezyan. Following the exhibition, the Armenian First Lady showed her a 5500-year-old shoe, which was discovered in 2008 in the Vayots Dzor Province.

== Personal life ==
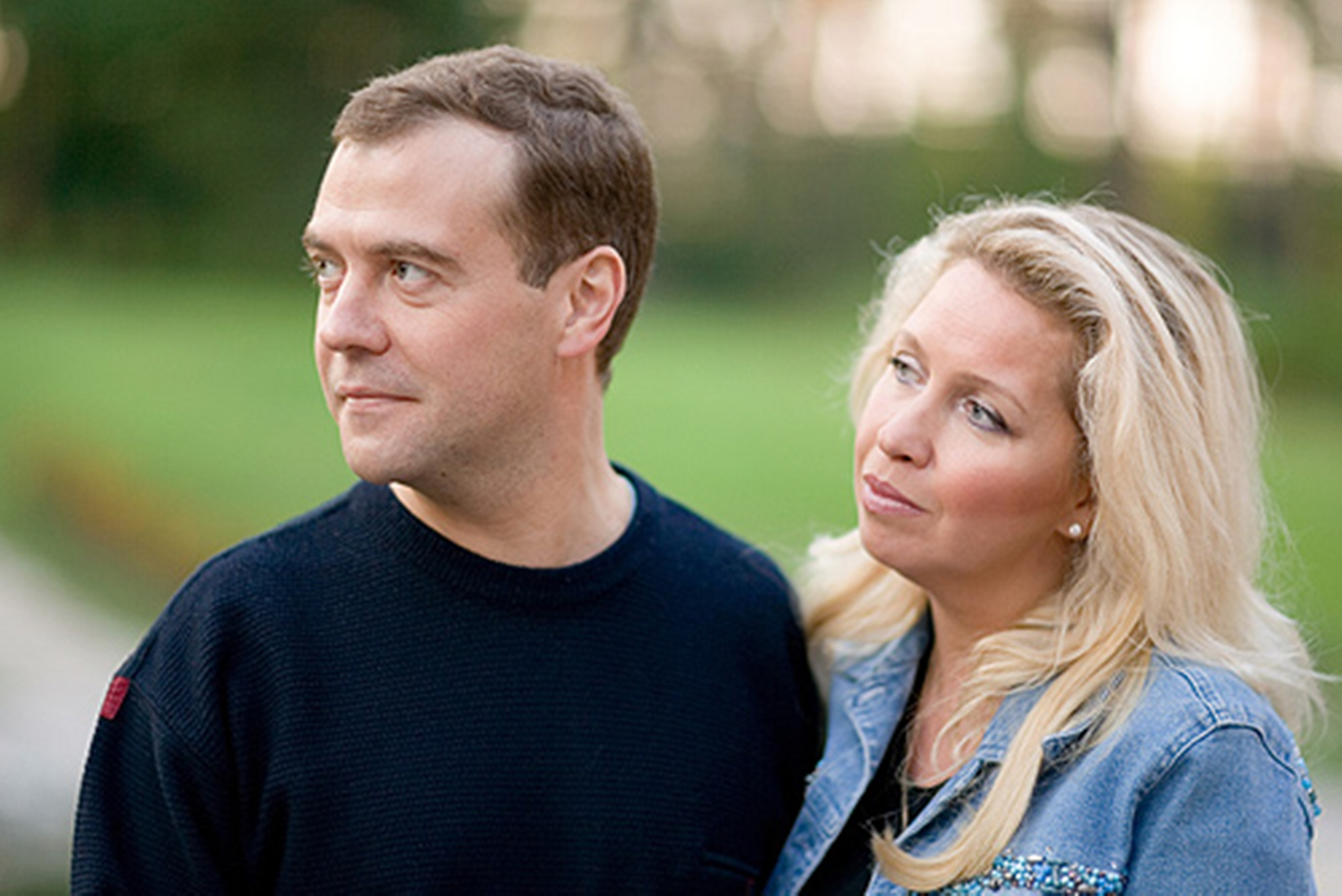
Svetlana with her husband, Dmitry

Svetlana married Dmitry Medvedev on 24 December 1993. The couple have a son born on 3 August 1995.

Honorary titles
Preceded by Lyudmila Putina	First Lady of Russia; 2008–2012	Succeeded by Lyudmila Putina
