= Pavlovsky Posad =

Town in Moscow Oblast, Russia

Pavlovsky Posad Павловский Посад
- Town
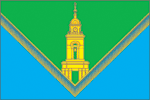
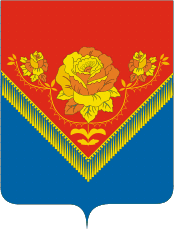
- Flag Coat of arms
- Interactive map of Pavlovsky Posad
- Location of Pavlovsky Posad Pavlovsky Posad (Moscow Oblast)
- Coordinates: 55°46′N 38°40′E
- Country: Russia
- Federal subject: Moscow Oblast
- Administrative district: Pavlovo-Posadsky District
- TownSelsoviet: Pavlovsky Posad
- Founded: 1844
- Town status since: 1844
- Elevation: 130 m (430 ft)

Population (2010 Census)
  - Total: 63,711
  - Estimate (2025): 65,331 (+2.5%)
  - Rank: 248th in 2010

Administrative status
  - Capital of: Pavlovo-Posadsky District, Town of Pavlovsky Posad

Municipal status
  - Municipal district: Pavlovo-Posadsky Municipal District
  - Urban settlement: Pavlovsky Posad Urban Settlement
  - Capital of: Pavlovo-Posadsky Municipal District, Pavlovsky Posad Urban Settlement
- Time zone: UTC+3 (MSK)
- Postal code: 142500–142507
- Dialing code: +7 49643
- OKTMO ID: 46759000001
- Website: www.pavposgor.ru

Pavlovsky Posad (Russian: Па́вловский Поса́д) is a town and the administrative center of Pavlovo-Posadsky District in Moscow Oblast, Russia, located 68 kilometers (42 mi) from Moscow, at the confluence of the Klyazma and Vokhna Rivers. Population: 63,711 (2010 census); 61,982 (2002 census); 71,297 (1989 Soviet census).

== History ==
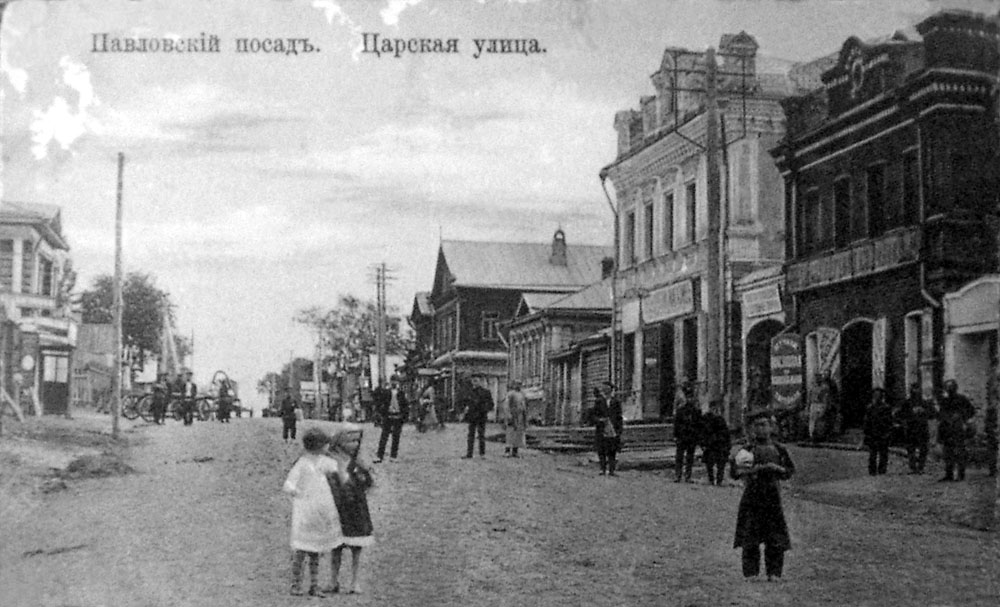
View of Tsarskaya Street in Pavlovsky Posad around 1910

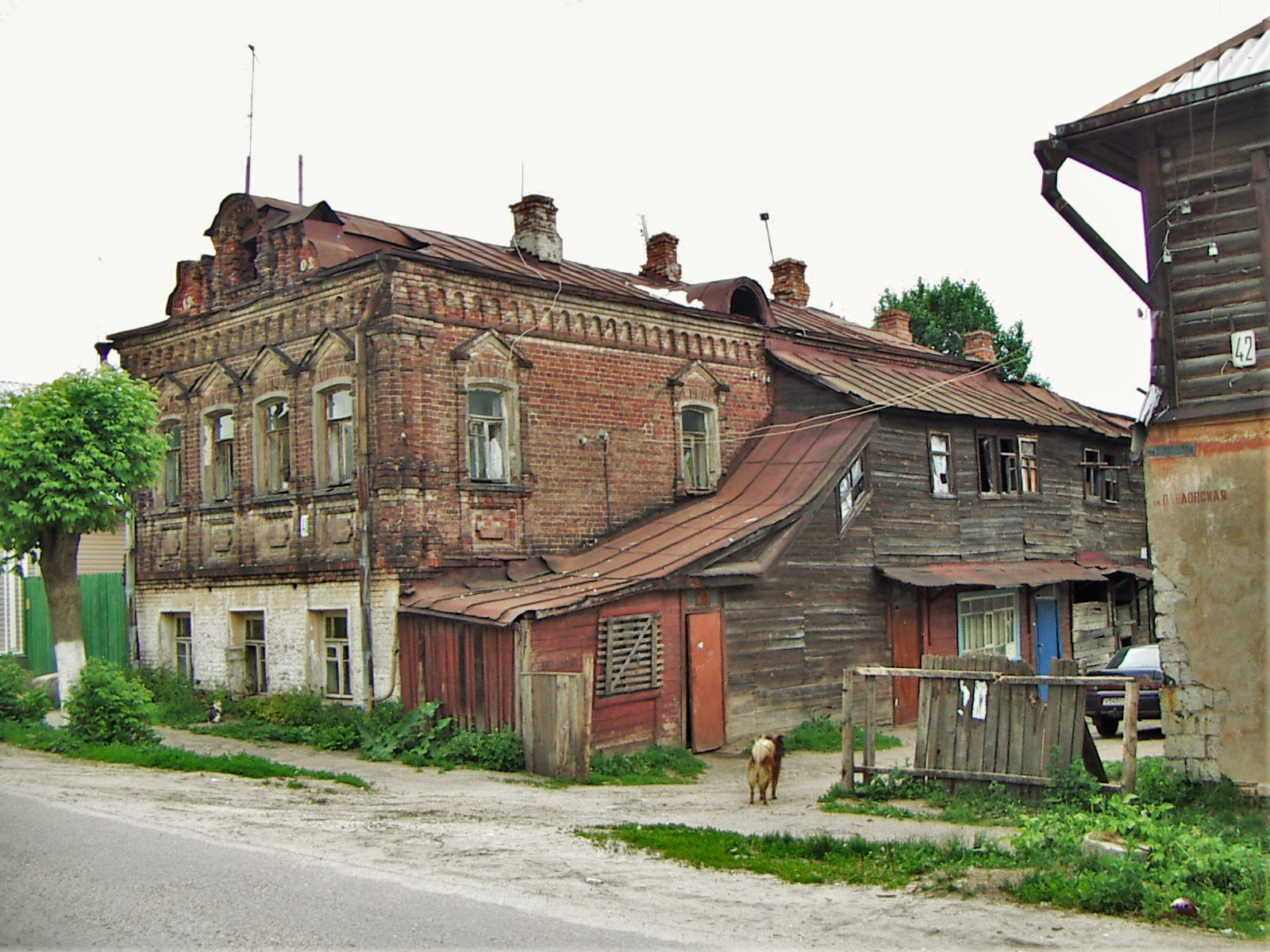
A typical house in Pavlovsky Posad

The town of Pavlovsky Posad was founded in 1844 by merging several villages (Pavlovo, Dubrovo, Zakharovo, and Melenki). From its very foundation, the land on which the town stands belonged to the Trinity Lavra of St. Sergius monastery of the Russian Orthodox Church. Later, from the mid-17th century, the land came into state ownership. Due to these peculiarities, Pavlovsky Posad never knew serfdom.

== Administrative and municipal status ==
Within the framework of administrative divisions, Pavlovsky Posad serves as the administrative center of Pavlovo-Posadsky District. As an administrative division, it is incorporated within Pavlovo-Posadsky District as the Town of Pavlovsky Posad. As a municipal division, the Town of Pavlovsky Posad is incorporated within Pavlovo-Posadsky Municipal District as Pavlovsky Posad Urban Settlement.

== Economy ==
From the very beginning Pavlovsky Posad has had the textile industry as its main business. This industry is still the most prominent in modern town. During the 1990s, most textile factories were transformed into public corporations and went through bankruptcy. The public float index for these factories is currently extremely low: about 90-95% of each factory's shares are owned by one person.

The town has also always been famous for its Pavlovo Posad shawl factories. One of these factories, Pavlovo-Posadkaya Manufaktura, is still producing traditional shawls and kerchiefs in the Russian style. Some other factories survived by concentrating on fire-equipment (such as fire hoses); whereas others yet are producing vestments for Orthodox priests.

=== Transportation ===
The Moscow–Vladimir railway goes through the town.

== Religion ==
Pokrovsko-Vasilyevsky Monastery was established near the cemetery in the beginning of the 20th century. In the monastery there's a cathedral that actually incorporates two independent churches: the upper church of Pokrov and the lower of St. Basil the Confessor, who was Vasily Gryaznov's saint patron. For his missionary work among the old believers, Vasily Gryaznov was granted sainthood in 1999. A cathedral also has a belltower. Both the cathedral and the belltower are built in the so-called pseudo-Russian style. There's also a little church of St. Andrei Rublev at the monastery gates.

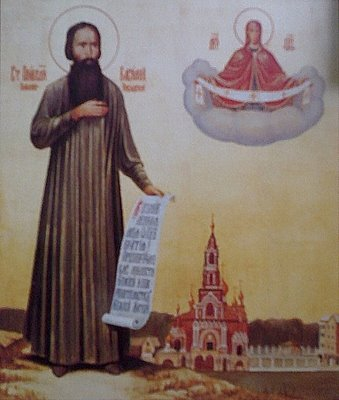
Icon of St. Basil the Confessor from Pavlovsky Posad

There are also three more Orthodox churches and one Old Believers' Orthodox church.

== Attractions ==
Local attractions include several 19th-century factory buildings, a local museum, a museum of Russian shawls and kerchiefs, and an exhibition center. Some old tombstones could be found on local Old Believer's cemeteries. There are also many old buildings in the streets of the town center.

== Notable people ==
- Valery Bykovsky, cosmonaut
- Oleg Chukhontsev, poet
- Natalya Petrusyova, speed skater
- Vyacheslav Tikhonov, actor
- Vasily of Pavlovsky Posad, Russian Orthodox saint
