= Operation Deutschland =

German war plan

- Native name: Operationsplan Deutschland
- Location: Germany
- Also known as: Operation Plan Germany
- Type: War plan
- Cause: Increased tensions with Russia
- Motive: To prepare Germany for a major war in Europe
- Organised by: German Armed Forces
- Participants: NATO
- Soldiers involved: 800,000 soldiers from various NATO countries
- Number of vehicles: 200,000 vehicles
- Website: https://www.bundeswehr.de/resource/blob/5761202/5101246ca9de726f78c4d988607532fc/oplan-data.pdf

Operation Deutschland also known as Operation Plan Germany, is a war plan created by the German Armed Forces in 2024 detailing how Germany would organize itself during a hypothetical large-scale war in Europe.

== Outline ==
Operation Deutschland is a 1,000 page long war plan detailing multiple points on how Germany would prepare a large war in Europe against Russia. Many details of the war plan are still classified. The outline of the outline of the war plan was disclosed to the German news outlet Frankfurter Allgemeine Zeitung. The plan describes how 800,000 NATO soldiers and 200,000 vehicles would be transferred through German territory in order to reach the frontline. The plan also includes how the 200,000 vehicles would be quickly moved through German territory in order to ensure that they reach the frontline.

== Issues ==
At a meeting in Hamburg, the head of Hamburg Regional Command Lieutenant Colonel Jörn Plischke noted that "70% of truck drivers in Germany are Eastern Europeans. In the event of war, they may simply not be in the country". There were also concerns about Germany's capability with producing military equipment and ammunition for the operation if it ever went into effect.
