= Russian Consulate School in Bonn =

Russian General Consulate School in Bonn
- Общеобразовательная школа при Генеральном консульстве России в Бонне, ФРГ
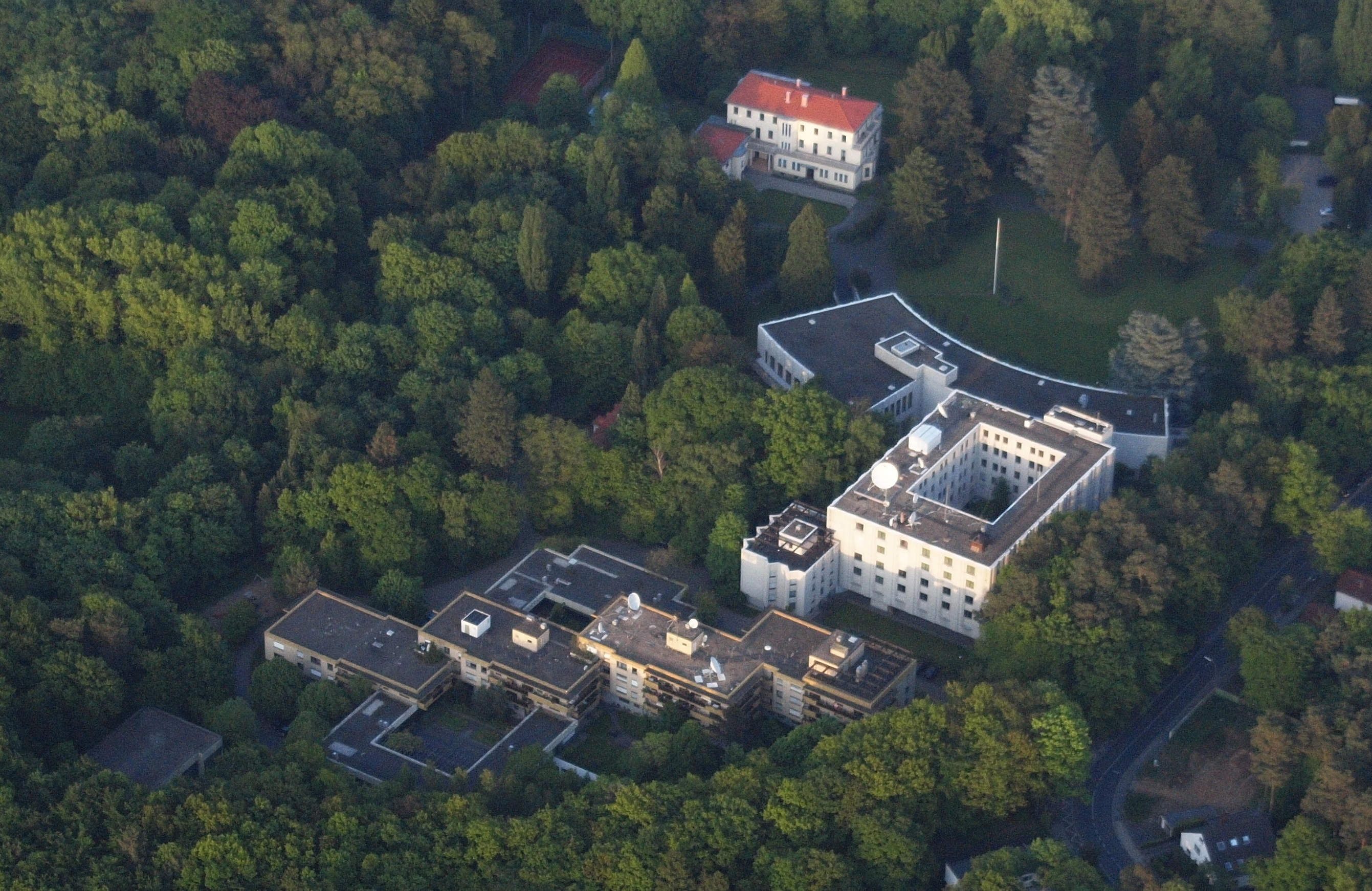

Location
- Waldstrasse 42; Bonn; Germany; 50.685222°N 7.132397°E

Information
- Former name: Secondary school under the Embassy of the USSR in Bonn
- Opened: 1981
- Language: Russian
- Website: https://schoolinbonn.ru/

The Russian Consulate School in Bonn (full official name: Secondary School with extended foreign language teaching of the General Consulate of Russia in Bonn, Russian: Средняя общеобразовательная школа с углубленным изучением иностранного языка Генерального консульства России в Бонне) is one of two Russian state-owned international schools in Germany along with the Russian Embassy School in Berlin.

The school was established in 1981 as a primary school of the Soviet embassy in West Germany. In 1986, the school was reorganized into a combined primary secondary school for children of the staff of the Soviet embassy in Bonn, the Soviet trade representation in Cologne, and the embassies of socialist Czechoslovakia, Bulgaria and Mongolia.

After the dissolution of the USSR, the school was transferred to the newly established Embassy of Russia in Germany along with other former Soviet diplomatic property. After the relocation of the embassy from Bonn to Berlin, the school became part of the Russian consulate in Bonn which remained in the former Soviet and Russian embassy compound.

== See also ==
- Russian Embassy School in Berlin
- German School Moscow
