= German School Moscow =

- Deutsche Schule Moskau; Немецкая школа в Москве
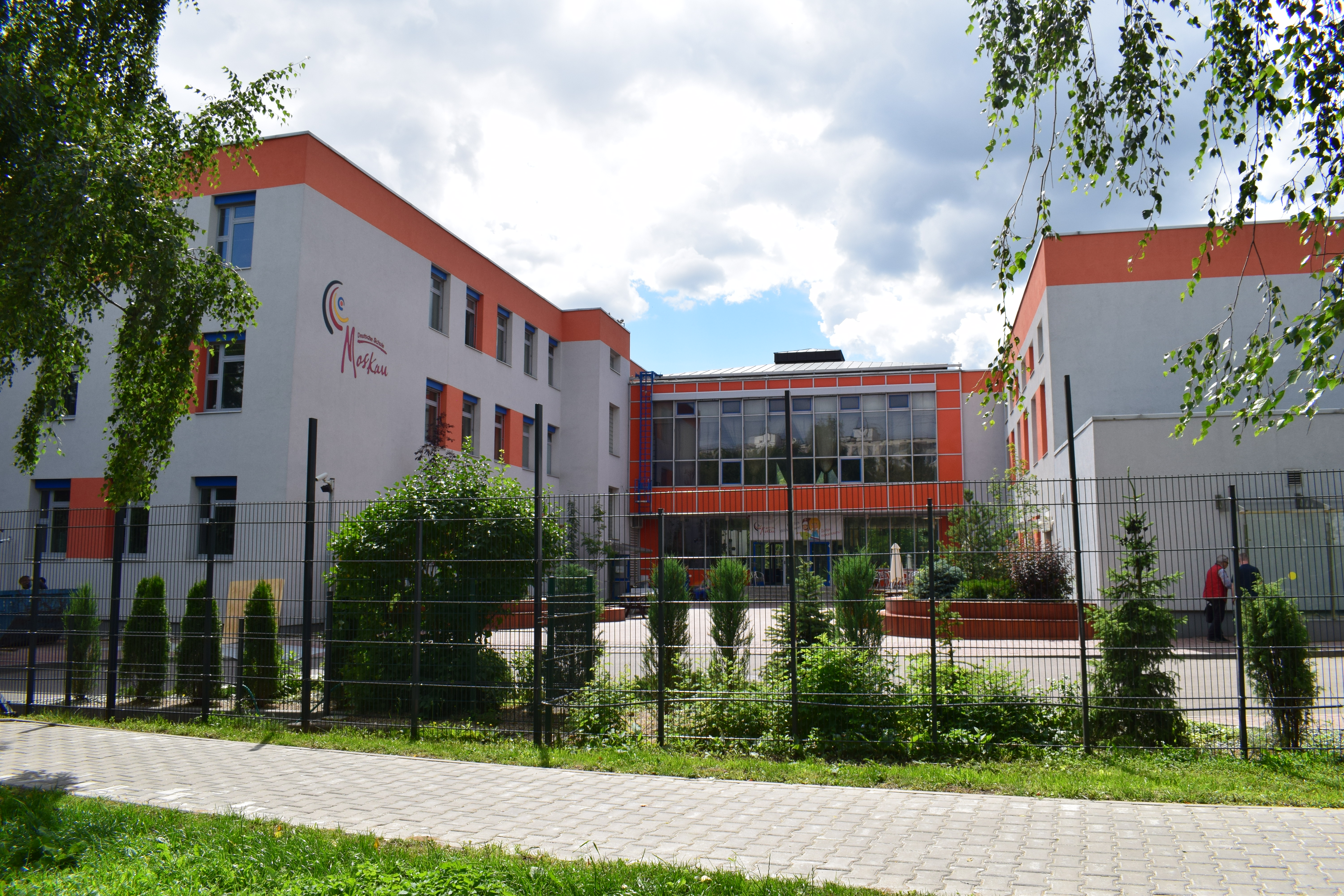
- The front of the German school

Location
- Prospekt Vernadskogo 103 / 5 119526 Moscow Russian Federation; Prospekt Wernadskogo 103 / 5 119526 Moskau Russische Föderation; Проспект Вернадского 103 / 5 119526 Москва Российская Федерация; Troparyovo-Nikulino District, Western Administrative Okrug, Moscow, Russia; 55°39′52″N 37°29′43″E

Information
- Type: German international school
- Motto: Beeilt Euch, Gutes zu tun!
- Established: 1956
- Principal: Peter Jigalin
- Grades: 1–12
- Website: deutscheschulemoskau.de

The German School Moscow "Friedrich-Joseph Haass" (German: Deutsche Schule Moskau, Russian: Немецкая школа в Москве) is a German-language private school in Troparyovo-Nikulino District, Western Administrative Okrug, Moscow, Russia. The German Foreign Office and the Central Agency for German Schools Abroad support the school.

In 2013 the majority of the students had citizenship of Austria, Germany, and/or Switzerland.

== Notable alumni ==
- Mariya and Yekaterina Putina (daughters of Vladimir Putin and Lyudmila Putina)
- Princess Maria Galitzine, Austrian aristocrat

== See also ==
- Germany-Russia relations
- Russian Embassy School in Berlin
- Russian Consulate School in Bonn
