= Germany–Russia relations =

- Germany: Russia

Diplomatic mission
- Embassy of Germany, Moscow: Embassy of Russia, Berlin

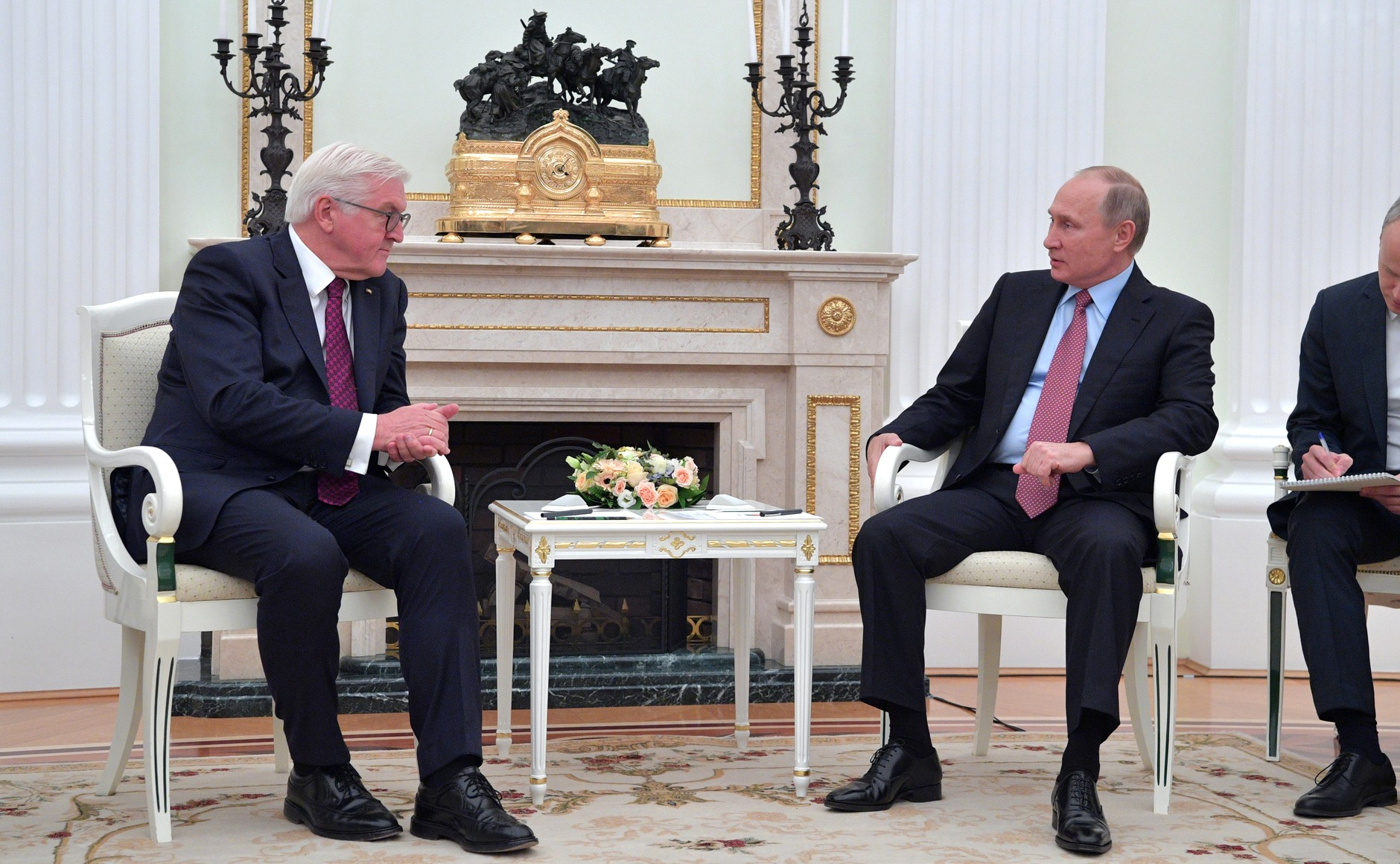
German President Frank-Walter Steinmeier during conversation with Russian President Vladimir Putin, 25 October 2017

Germany–Russia relations display cyclical patterns, moving back and forth from cooperation and alliance to strain and to total warfare.

Historian John Wheeler-Bennett says that since the 1740s:

Relations between Russia and Germany have been a series of alienations, distinguished for their bitterness, and of rapprochements, remarkable for their warmth. A cardinal factor in the relationship has been the existence of an independent Poland. When separated by a buffer state, the two great Powers of eastern Europe have been friendly, whereas a contiguity of frontiers has bred hostility.

Otto von Bismarck established the League of the Three Emperors in 1873 with the Russian Empire, German Empire, and Austria-Hungary. But after Bismarck's dismissal in 1890, his successors chose to support Austria against Russia over competing influence in the Balkans. Germany fought against Russia in World War I (1914–1918). Relations were warm in the 1920s, very cold throughout the 1930s, cooperative and friendly in 1939–41, and hostile in 1941–45. In the 1920s both countries co-operated with each other in trade and (secretly) in military affairs. Hostilities escalated in the 1930s as the fascists sponsored by Berlin and the communists sponsored by Moscow fought each other across the world, most famously in the Spanish Civil War (1936–39). In a stunning turnabout in August 1939, both countries came to an agreement, and divided up the previously independent nations of Eastern Europe. That détente collapsed in 1941 when Germany invaded the USSR. The Soviets survived however and formed an alliance with Britain and the U.S., and pushed the Germans back, capturing Berlin in May 1945.

During the Cold War 1947–1991, Germany was divided, with East Germany under Communist control and under the close watch of Moscow, which stationed a large military force there and repressed an uprising in 1953.

Germany has been consistently among the countries with the most negative views of Russia. In 2014 only 19% of Germans viewed Russia positively while 79% had a negative opinion and 81% disapproved of the Russian Leadership, making Germany one of the 10 countries with the highest disapproval in the world. In 2021 73% disapproved, still one of the highest numbers in the world. After the 2022 Russian invasion of Ukraine German distrust of Russia reached a record of 90% and as of 2024, 95% disapprove of Russia's President Vladimir Putin.

Relations turned highly negative in 2014 in response to Russia's seizure of Crimea from Ukraine and support for insurgents in Ukraine. Germany was a leader between NATO Quint in imposing round after round of increasingly harsh European Union sanctions against the Russian oil and banking industries and top allies of President Vladimir Putin. Russia responded by cutting food imports from the EU.

The 2022 Russian invasion of Ukraine led to a near complete reversal of German-Russian relations with the new German Chancellor, Olaf Scholz, "ordering" the immediate transfer of thousands of missiles to the Ukrainian military to aid in its fight against the invading Russian forces. Germany has also participated in severe economic banking sanctions against Russia since the start of the war. However, Germany is very dependent on Russia for natural gas and has been less willing to sanction this sector, aside from halting the Nord Stream 2 gas pipeline and the attack on September 26 temporarily shutting the pipes down. The pipeline made up a significant portion of Germany's petroleum imports from Russia. In response to sanctions imposed by Germany and the West, Russia gradually plunged flows of gas, which came to a complete halt in September 2022.

== History ==
=== Early history ===
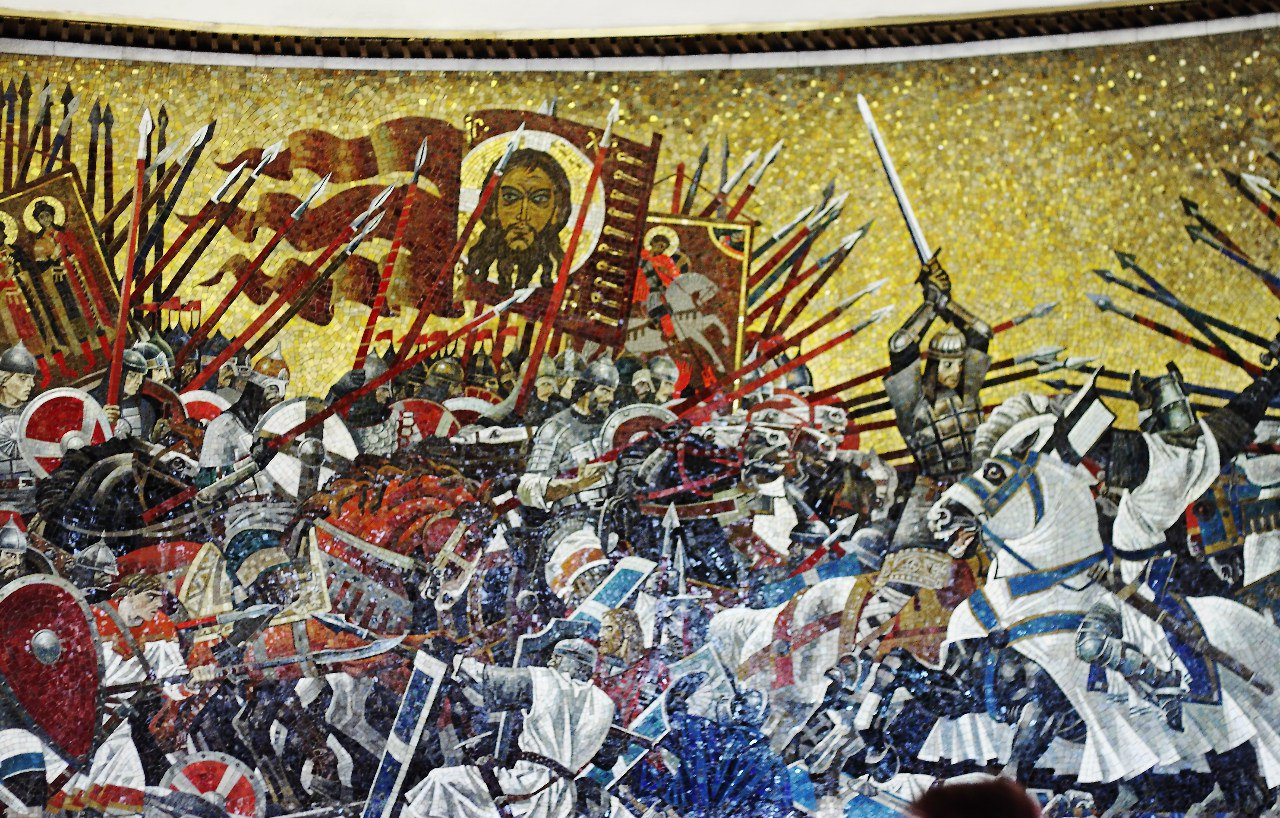
Prince Alexander Nevsky defeats the Teutonic Knights at the Battle of the Ice in 1242 (20th century work).

The earliest contact between Germans and East Slavs is unknown, though evidence of East Germanic loan-words suggest Slavic interactions with the Goths. Substantive historically recorded contact goes back to the times of the Teutonic Knights' campaigns in the Baltic region, where the Knights took control of the land in the 13th century CE. Prince Alexander Nevsky defeated the Teutonic Knights at the Battle of the Ice in 1242.

Russia before the mid-18th century stood largely aloof from German affairs, while Germany, until the Napoleonic period, remained divided into numerous small states under the nominal leadership of the Holy Roman Emperor.

After Russia's Great Northern War of 1700–1721 against Sweden, however, Russia's influence spread definitively into the Baltic area.

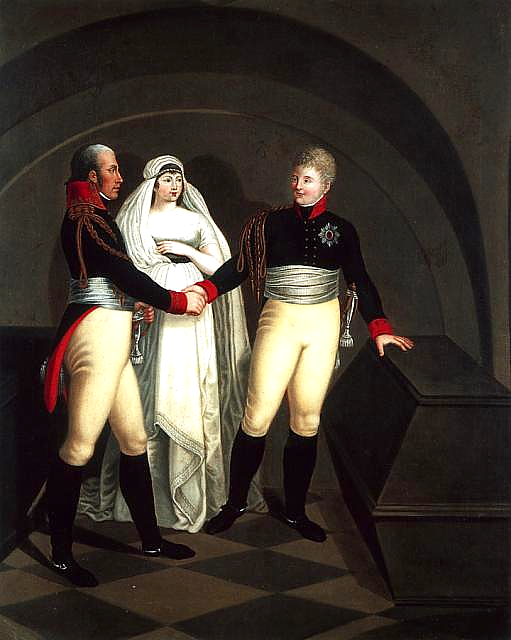
Emperor Alexander I of Russia venerates the mortal remains of Frederick the Great in the presence of King Frederick William III and Louise of Mecklenburg-Strelitz in 1805.

=== German migrations eastward ===
Over the centuries, from the Middle Ages onwards, German settlers steadily moved eastward, often into mostly Slavic areas and areas near to or controlled by Russia. Flegel points out that German farmers, traders and entrepreneurs moved into East and West Prussia, the Baltic states, the Danzig and Vistula River region, Galicia, Slovenia, the Banat, the Bachka, Bukovina, Transylvania, the Volga River district of Russia, Posen, the Duchy of Warsaw, Polish and Ukrainian Volhynia, Bessarabia, and the Mount Ararat region between the 17th and the 20th centuries. Often they came at the invitation of Russian governments. The Germans typically became the dominant factors in land-owning and in business enterprise. Some groups, such as part of the Mennonites, migrated to North America in 1860–1914. The Germans in the Baltic states returned home voluntarily in 1940. Some 12 to 14 million were brutally expelled from Poland, Czechoslovakia and other countries in Eastern Europe in 1944–46, with the death of 500,000 or more. When the Cold War ended Germany funded the return of hundreds of thousands of people of German descent, whether or not they spoke German.

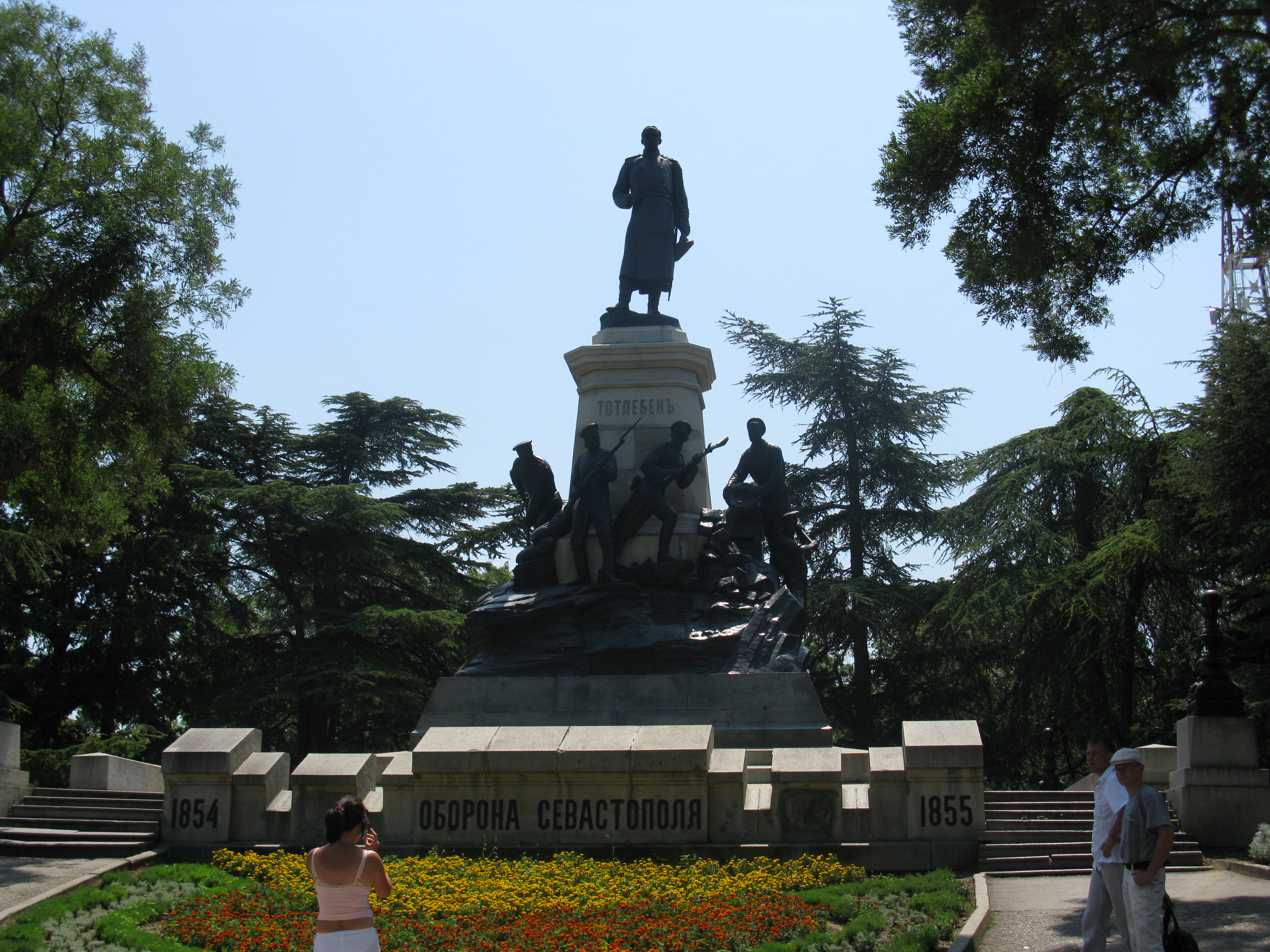
Monument to Baltic German military engineer Eduard Totleben in Sevastopol, Crimea

A number of Baltic Germans served as ranking generals in the Russian Imperial Army and Navy, including Michael Barclay de Tolly, Adam von Krusenstern, Fabian von Bellingshausen, Friedrich von Buxhoeveden, Paul von Rennenkampf, Ivan Ivanovich Michelson and Eduard Totleben.

Many Baltic Germans (such as Baron Roman von Ungern-Sternberg, Baron Pyotr Nikolayevich Wrangel, Yevgeny Miller, and Anatoly Lieven) sided with the Whites and related anti-Bolshevik forces (like the Baltische Landeswehr and the Freikorps movement) during the Russian Civil War.

=== Prussia and Russia ===
With the creation of the Kingdom of Prussia in 1701 and the proclamation of the Russian Empire in 1721, two powerful new states emerged that began to interact.

They fought on opposite sides during the War of the Austrian Succession (1740 – 1748), but the war saw both grow in power. Russia defeated Sweden and Prussia defeated Austria. Russia and Prussia again were at odds during the Seven Years' War (1756–1763) and fought the battles of Gross-Jägersdorf, Zorndorf, Kay and Kunersdorf. However, when Russian Tsar Peter III came to power, he made peace with Prussia by signing the Treaty of Saint Petersburg, allowing Prussian King Frederick the Great to concentrate on his other enemies.

Prussia and Russia in agreement with Austria then cooperated to carve up Poland-Lithuania between them in 1772, 1793, and 1795. Poland disappeared from the map.

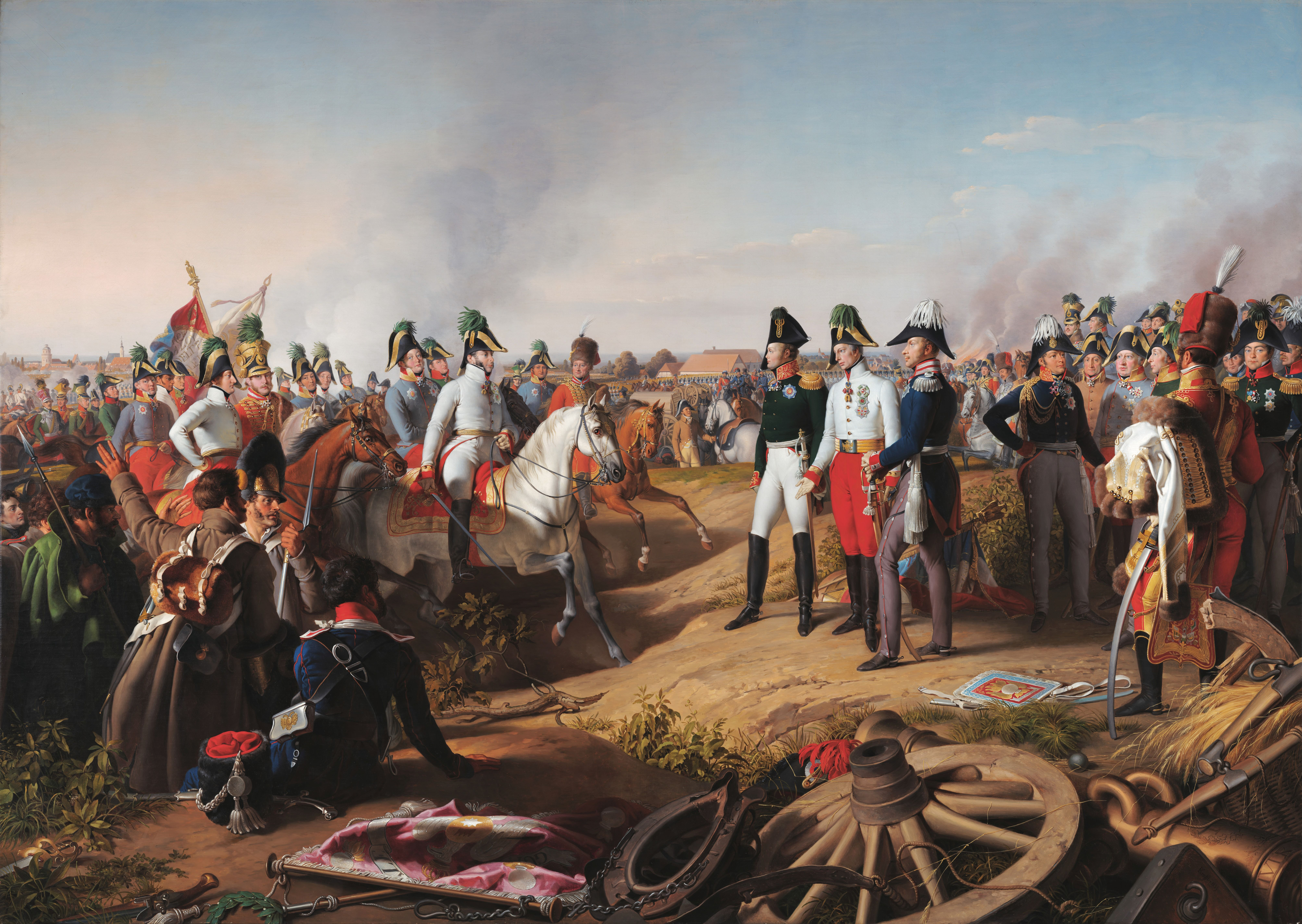
Johann Peter Krafft.The Declaration of Victory After the Battle of Leipzig by Frederick III of Prussia, Alexander I of Russia and Francis I of Austria after the Battle of Leipzig, 1813

Both Russia and Prussia had absolute monarchies that reacted sharply when the French Revolution executed the king. They at first were part of the coalition against the new French regime during the French Revolutionary Wars and later the Napoleonic Wars. During the Napoleonic era (1799 to 1815) Austria, Prussia, and Russia were at one time or another in coalition with Napoleon against his arch-enemy Great Britain. In the end, the two German states of Austria and Prussia united with Russia and Britain in opposing Napoleon. That coalition was primarily a matter of convenience for each nation. The key matchmaker was the Austrian Chancellor Klemens von Metternich, who forged a united front that proved decisive in overthrowing Napoleon, 1813–1814.

Russia was one of the most powerful forces on the continent after 1815 and played a major role in the Concert of Europe which included France, Russia, Austria and Britain, but not Prussia. In 1815, the Holy Alliance consisting of Prussia, Russia and Austria was completed in Paris. For forty years (1816–56) Russian-German diplomat Karl Nesselrode as foreign minister guided Russian foreign policy. The revolutions of 1848 did not reach Russia, but its political and economic system was inadequate to maintain a modern army. It did poorly in the Crimean War. As Fuller notes, "Russia had been beaten on the Crimean peninsula, and the military feared that it would inevitably be beaten again unless steps were taken to surmount its military weakness." The Crimean War marked the end of the Concert of Europe. Prussia was shaken by the Revolutions of 1848 but was able to withstand the revolutionaries' call to war against Russia. Prussia did go to war with Denmark, however, and was only stopped by British and Russian pressure. Prussia remained neutral in the Crimean War.

Prussia's successes in the Wars of German Unification in the 1860s were facilitated by Russia's lack of involvement. The creation of the German Empire under Prussian dominance in 1871, however, greatly changed the relations between the two countries.

=== The German and Russian Empires ===
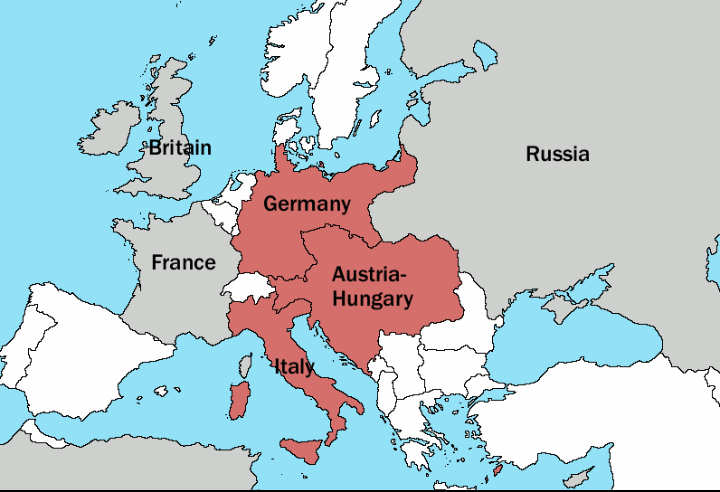
The Triple Alliance (shown in red) was constructed by Germany to isolate France; it responded by a new alliance, the Triple Entente with Britain and Russia. As a result, Russia and Germany were now on opposite sides.

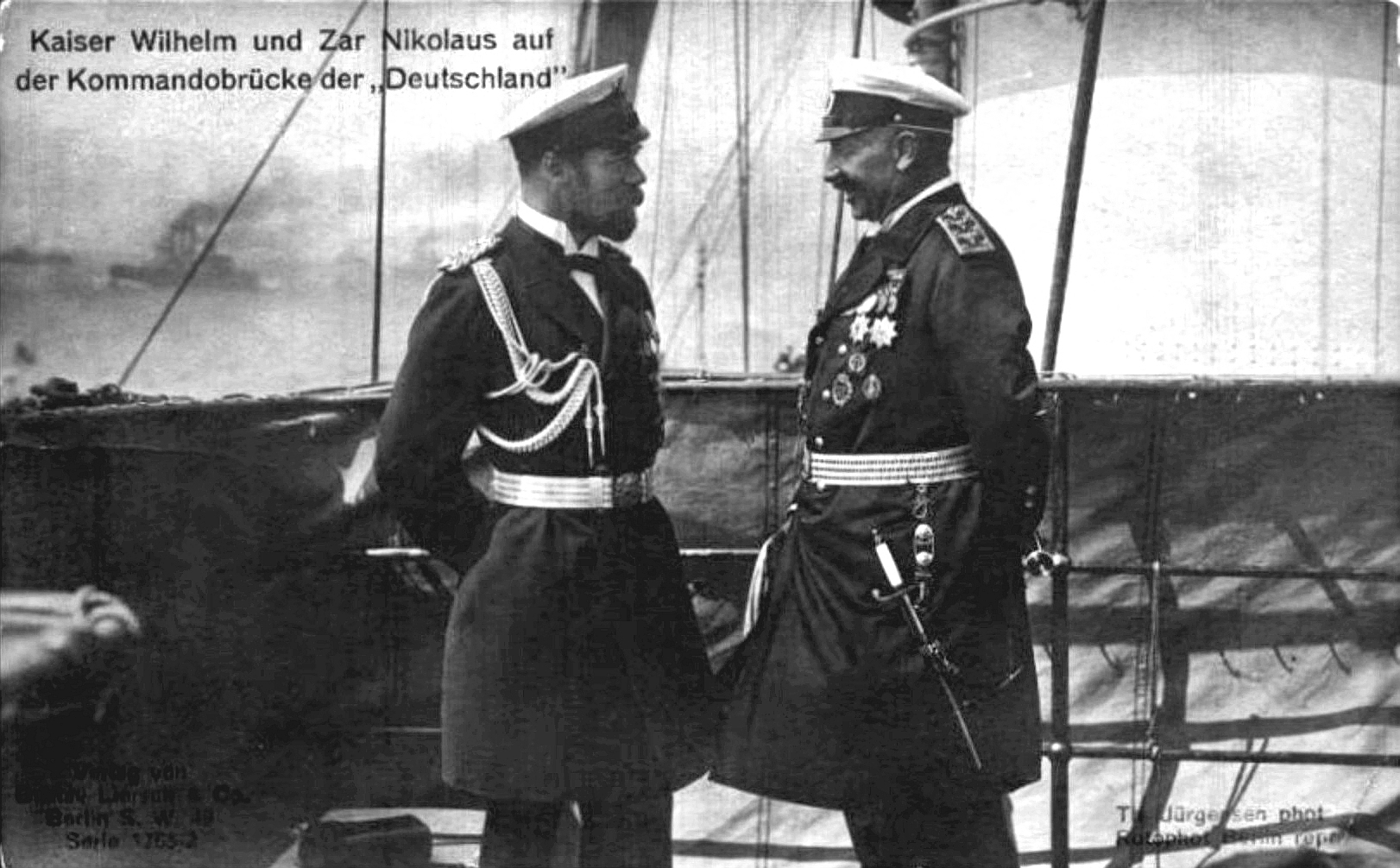
Czar Nicholas II of Russia and his cousin, Kaiser Wilhelm II of Germany, 1907

Initially, it seemed as if the two great empires would be strong allies. German Chancellor Otto von Bismarck formed the League of the Three Emperors in 1872 binding together Russia, Austria, and Germany. The League stated that republicanism and socialism were common enemies, and that the three powers would discuss any matters concerning foreign policy. Bismarck needed good relations with Russia in order to keep France isolated. In 1877–1878, Russia fought a victorious war with the Ottoman Empire and attempted to impose the Treaty of San Stefano on it. This upset the British in particular, as they were long concerned with preserving the Ottoman Empire and preventing a Russian takeover of the Bosphorus. Germany hosted the Congress of Berlin (1878), whereby a more moderate peace settlement was agreed to. Germany had no direct interest in the Balkans, however, which was largely an Austrian and Russian sphere of influence.

In 1879, Bismarck formed a Dual Alliance of Germany and Austria-Hungary, with the aim of mutual military assistance in the case of an attack from Russia, which was not satisfied with the agreement reached at the Congress of Berlin. The establishment of the Dual Alliance led Russia to take a more conciliatory stance, and in 1887, the so-called Reinsurance Treaty was signed between Germany and Russia: in it, the two powers agreed on mutual military support in the case that France attacked Germany, or in case of an Austrian attack on Russia. Russia turned its attention eastward to Asia and remained largely inactive in European politics for the next 25 years.

A continental alliance of France, Germany, and Russia against Britain was proposed by Count Mikhail Muravyov and Théophile Pierre Delcassé, at the time of the Anglo-Boer War in 1900 but the pact never materialized when Wilhelm II declined due to irreconcilable, prestige and independent policy.

Germany was somewhat worried about Russia's potential industrialization—it had far more potential soldiers—while Russia feared Germany's already established industrial power. In 1907 Russia went into a coalition with Britain and France, the Triple Entente. Treaty of Björkö was a secret mutual defense agreement signed on 1905, an island near the Swedish coast, between Germany and Russia, aiming to strengthen bilateral ties and counterbalance other European alliances. It was countersigned by Heinrich von Tschirschky, head of the German Foreign Office, and Naval Minister Aleksei Birilev. The treaty was sought to isolate France diplomatically by enticing Russia away from its partnership with France and possibly enhance Germany's position in Russo-France alliance towards at Britain, but it ultimately failed to alter the preexisting alliance networks. In June 1909, Kaiser Wilhelm II and Tsar Nicholas II exchanged cordial visits aboard the Royal yachts Hohenzollern and Standart off Bjorko. This possible rapprochement meeting was significant as it marked a diplomatic moment between the two emperors, who shared a common interest in maintaining European peace and stability the meeting represented a temporary easing of tensions following the Bosnian Crisis. It demonstrated imperial attempts at leveraged international relations. The visit was accompanied by German Minister for Foreign Affairs Herr von Schoen and Russian Premier M. Stolypin.

In November 1910 and 1913, wherein two monarchs visited in Potsdam for private discussions aimed at strengthening family ties and easing diplomatic tensions between their empires. The personal rapport between Wilhelm and Nicholas, documented through the Willy–Nicky correspondence, the visit largely ceremonial it own symbolized the complex interplay of personal diplomacy in ultimately could not overcome the pressures of national alliances and political crise. The ultimate result of this was that Russia and Germany became enemies in World War I. The Eastern Front saw Germany successful, with victories at Tannenberg, First and Second Masurian Lakes and Lake Naroch. The czarist system collapsed in 1917. The Bolsheviks came to power in the October Revolution. The new regime signed the Treaty of Brest-Litovsk which was highly advantageous to Germany, although it was reversed when Germany surrendered to the Allies in November 1918.

=== Interwar period ===
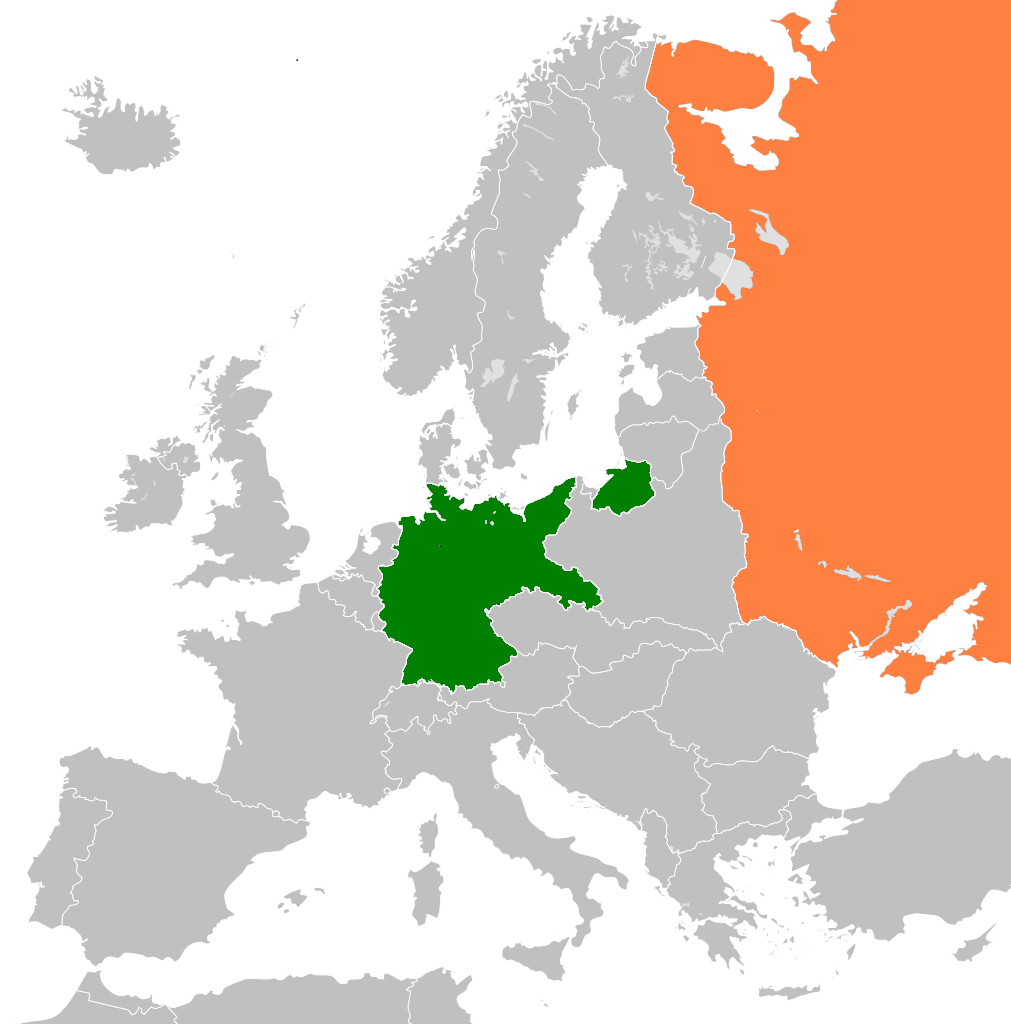

Weimar Republic (1918–1933) Nazi Germany (1933–1945)	Russian SFSR (1917–1922) as a sovereign state USSR (1922–1990)

After the peace treaties that ended the Great War, the newly created states of the Weimar Republic and the Soviet Union both found themselves outcasts in the international system and gravitated toward each other. The Treaty of Rapallo (1922) formalized their warming relationship. Until 1933 the Soviet Union secretly provided training camps for the German Armed Forces.

The coming to power in 1933 of Adolf Hitler and the creation of the Nazi state with its virulent anti-Semitic and anti-communist rhetoric made for extremely hostile propaganda in both directions. Nazi propaganda, across Europe and Latin America, focused on warnings against Jewish and Bolshevik threats emanating from Moscow. The Comintern, representing Moscow's international Communist network, moved to a popular front approach after 1934, allowing the Communists worldwide to cooperate with socialists, intellectuals and workers on the left in opposing Fascism. The worldwide left-wing support for the Republicans in the Spanish Civil War (1936–39) proved of enormous aid to the Communist cause. Germany and the Soviets both sent military forces and advisors into Spain, as did Italy.

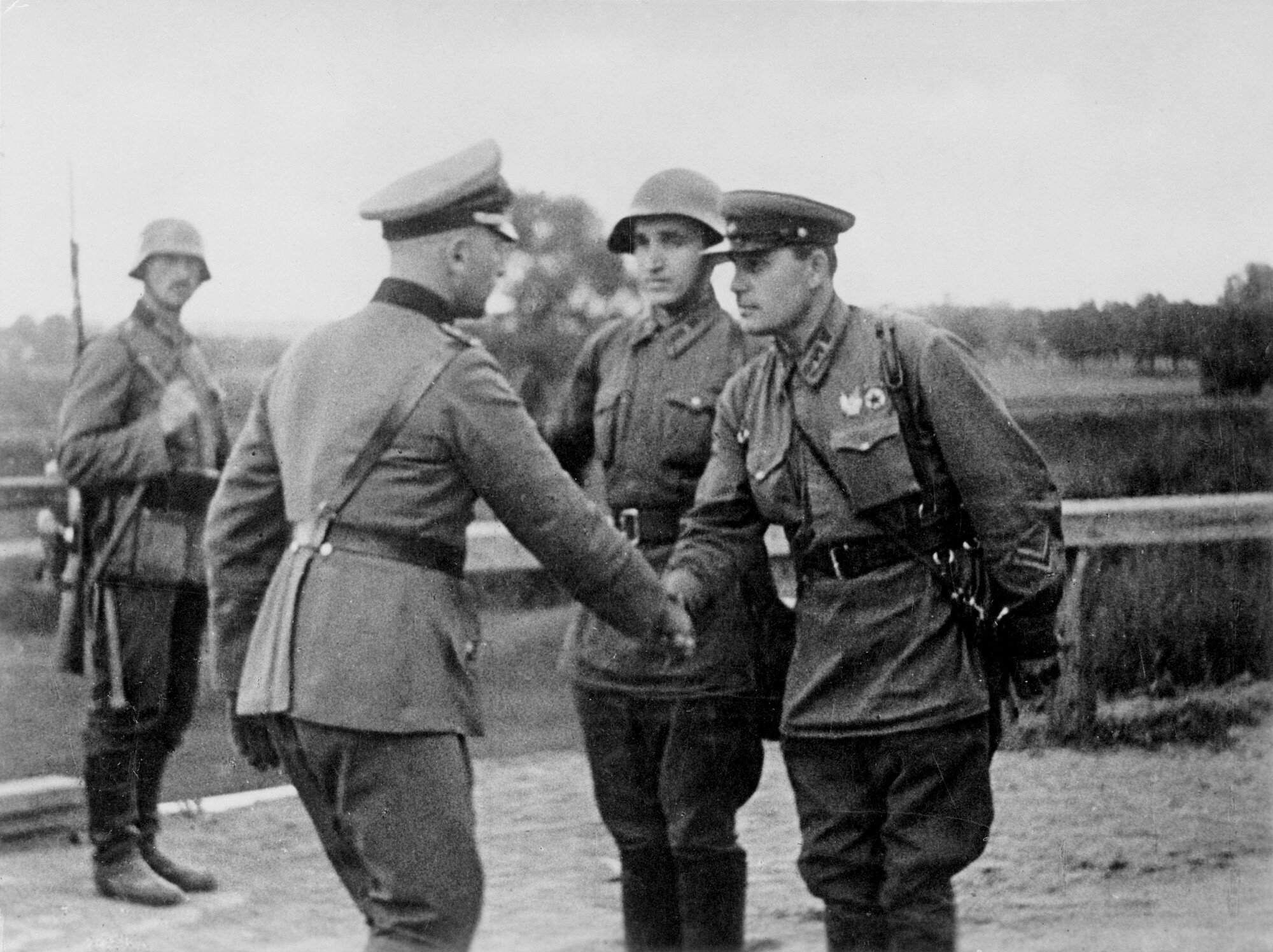
German and Soviet troops shaking hands following the invasion of Poland in September 1939

The Spanish Civil War was in part a proxy war. The Nationalists led by General Francisco Franco and the Republican government fought it out for the control of the country. Militarily, the Nationalists usually had the upper hand and they won in the end. Germany sent in the Condor Legion comprising elite air and tank units to the Nationalist forces. The Soviet Union sent military and political advisors, and sold munitions in support of the "Loyalist," or Republican, side. The Comintern helped Communist parties around the world send volunteers to the International Brigades that fought for the Loyalists.

In August 1939 the two states stunned the world by coming to a major agreement, the Molotov–Ribbentrop Pact. They agreed to invade and partition Poland and divided up Eastern Europe. The Soviets provided Germany with oil and reversed the anti-Nazi rhetoric of Communist parties around the world. At the same time, the Soviet and German interests were not reconciled in the Balkano-Danubian region. Thus, during 1940-1941 hot Soviet-German discussions concerning a new division of the South-Eastern Europe were going on. In June 1940, Moscow recognized that Slovakia was in the German sphere of influence. Otherwise, Russian request for the exclusive influence in Romania, Bulgaria and Turkey was rejected by Berlin in November 1940.

=== German invasion of Soviet Union and World War II ===
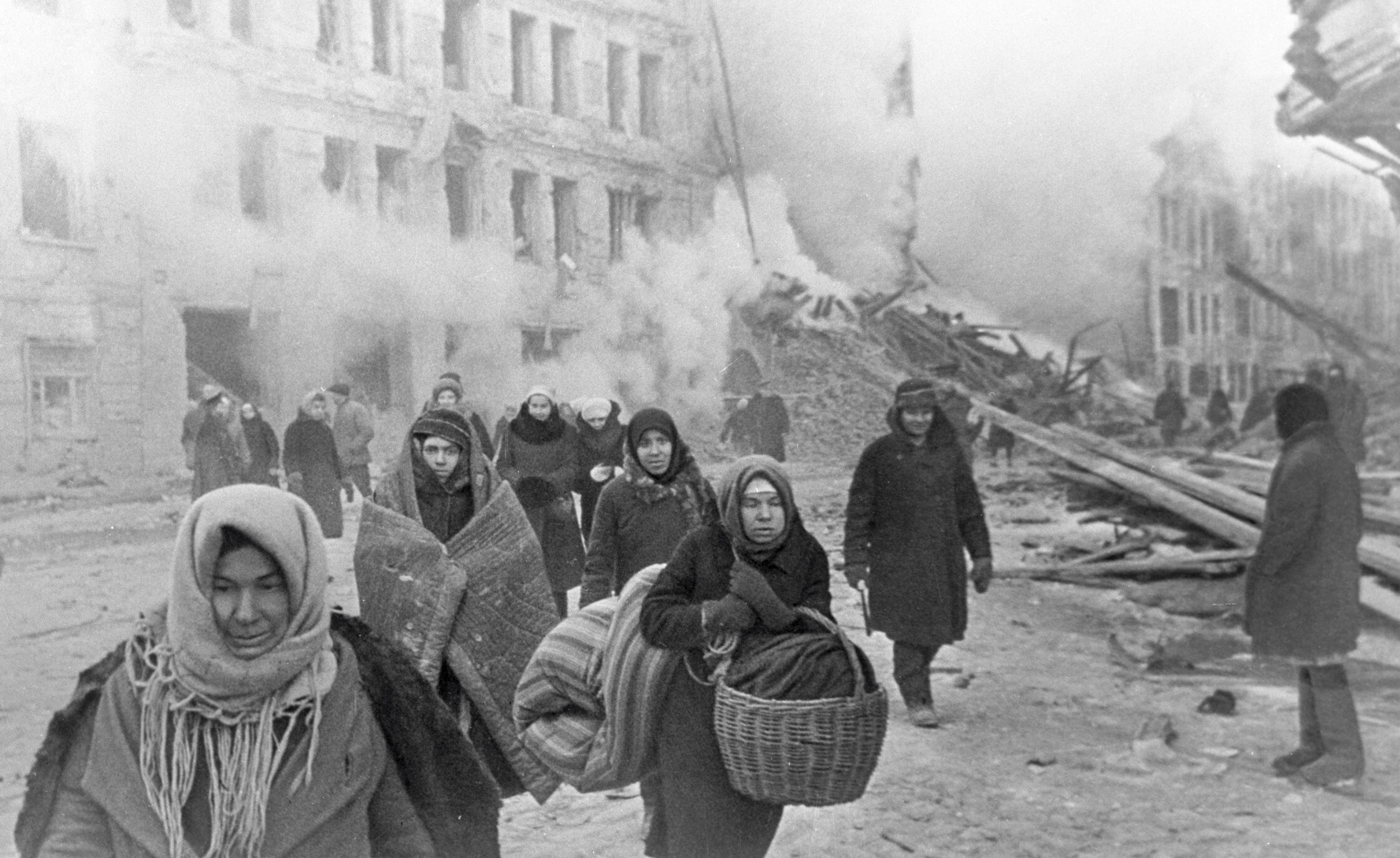
The siege of Leningrad during World War II was the deadliest siege of a city in history.

In 1941, it was Russia's turn, yet Joseph Stalin refused to believe the multiple warnings of a German invasion. Operation Barbarossa began in June 1941, captured or destroyed multiple Soviet armies, and reached the gates of Moscow by December. Stalin fought back and forged close relations with Britain and the United States, both of which provided large amounts of munitions.

The Eastern Front became an ideological and race war with more than 27 million killed, including Soviet prisoners of war and Jews. It was perhaps the bloodiest conflict in human history.

=== After the war: the Soviet Union and the two German states ===
West Germany–Soviet Union relations
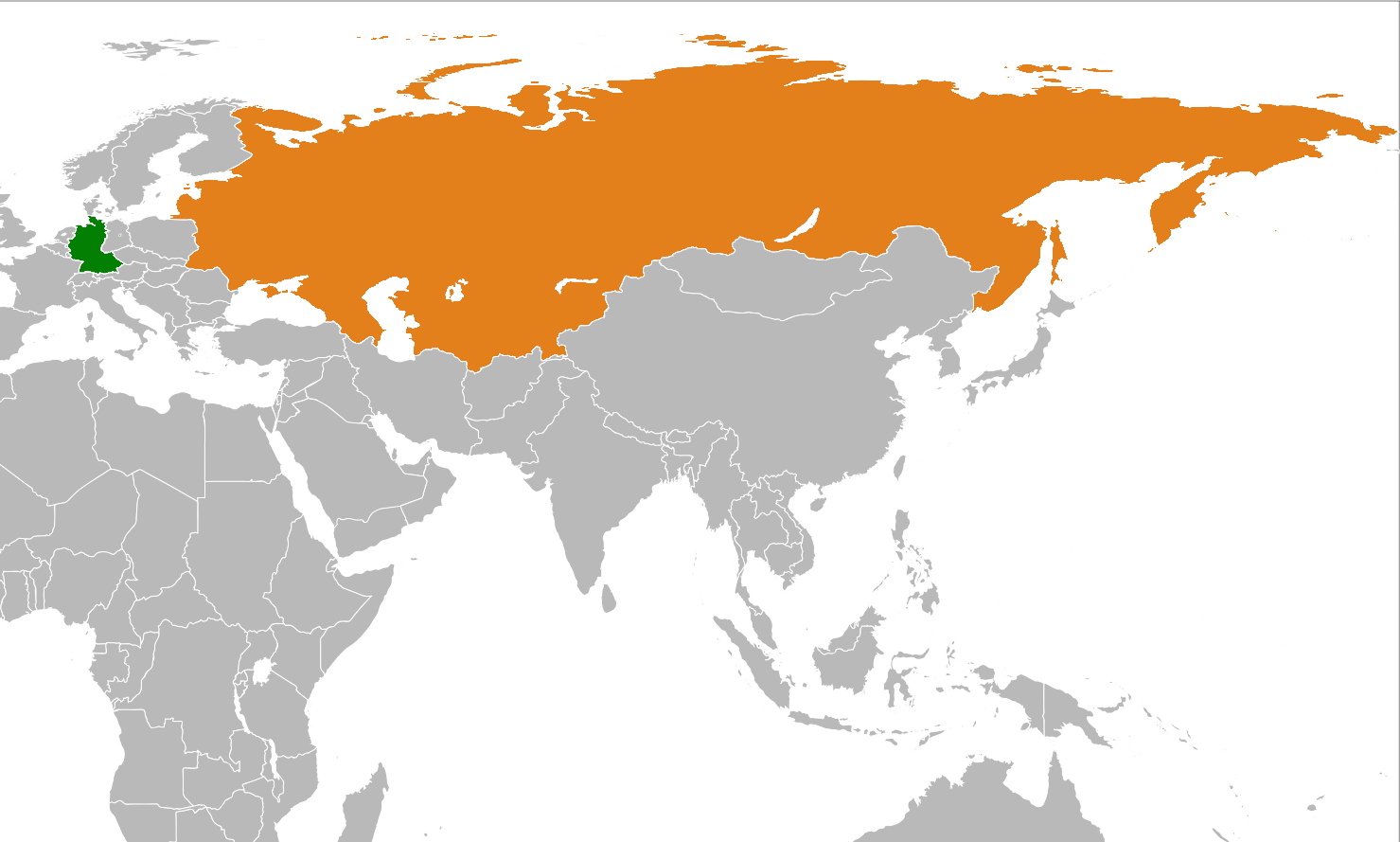

- West Germany: Soviet Union

East Germany–Soviet Union relations
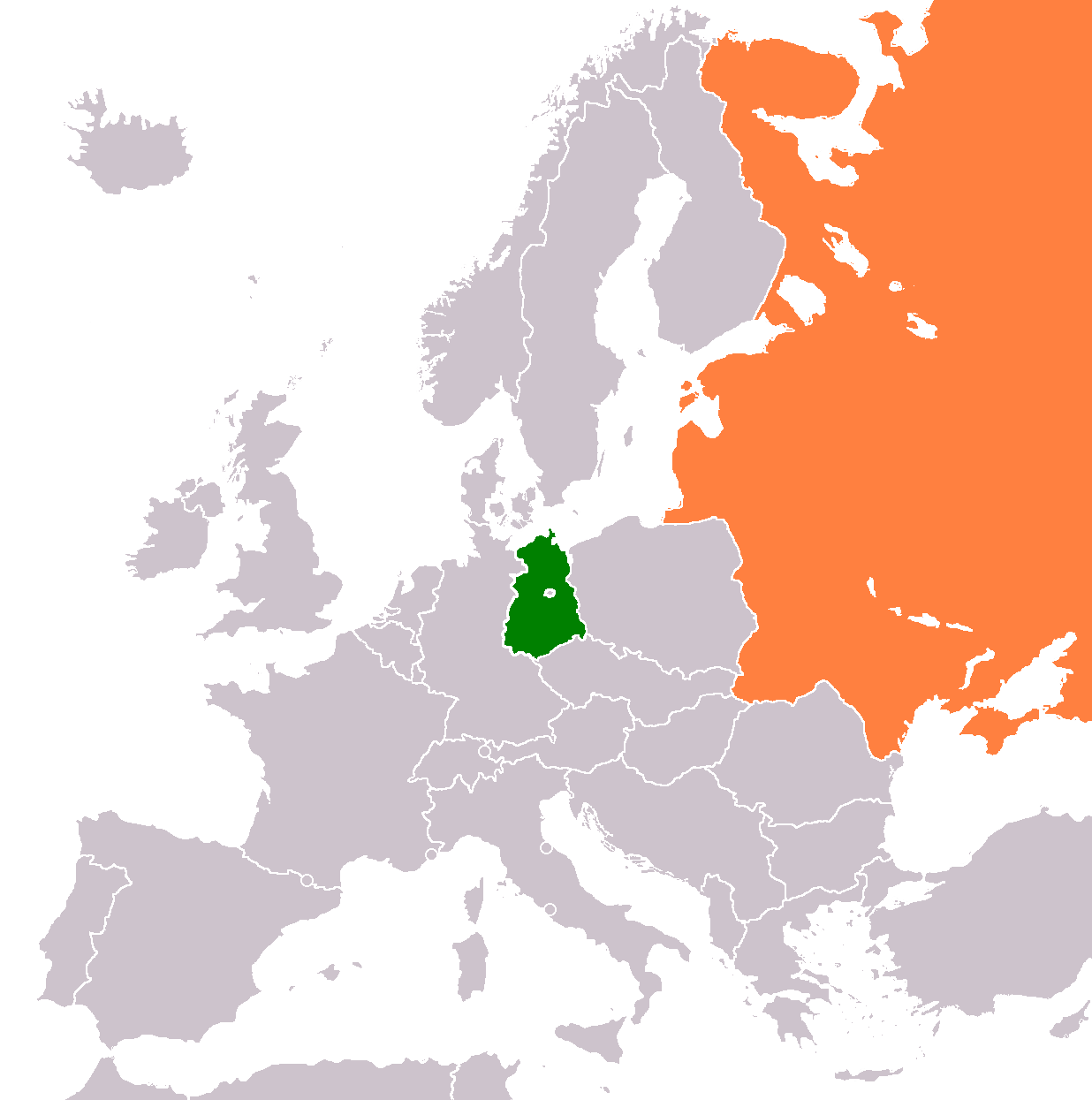

- East Germany: Soviet Union

The defeat of Germany by the Soviets and the Western allies eventually led to the occupation and partition of Germany and the expulsions of most ethnic-Germans from Soviet-conquered areas.

The creation of West Germany and East Germany complicated relations. West Germany initially tried to claim that it was the only German state and the East was illegitimate and under the Hallstein Doctrine refused to have relation with any socialist state except the Soviet Union itself. This policy eventually gave way to Ostpolitik, under which West Germany recognized the East.

Gorbachev gave up on trying to support the deeply unpopular East German government. After the Revolutions of 1989 and the fall of the Berlin Wall, the Communist regime in East Germany collapsed and German reunification took place. One issue was the presence of large numbers of Soviet troops; West Germany paid for their repatriation for housing them in the USSR.

Despite the two 20th-century wars, there are few hard feelings against Germany in modern Russia, particularly on the part of Russians born after 1945. Moreover, in many places in Russia German war cemeteries were established in places of fierce World War II battles, whereas Germans were happy to get rid of the hated Stasi and Russian occupation.

=== Federal Republic of Germany and the Russian Federation ===
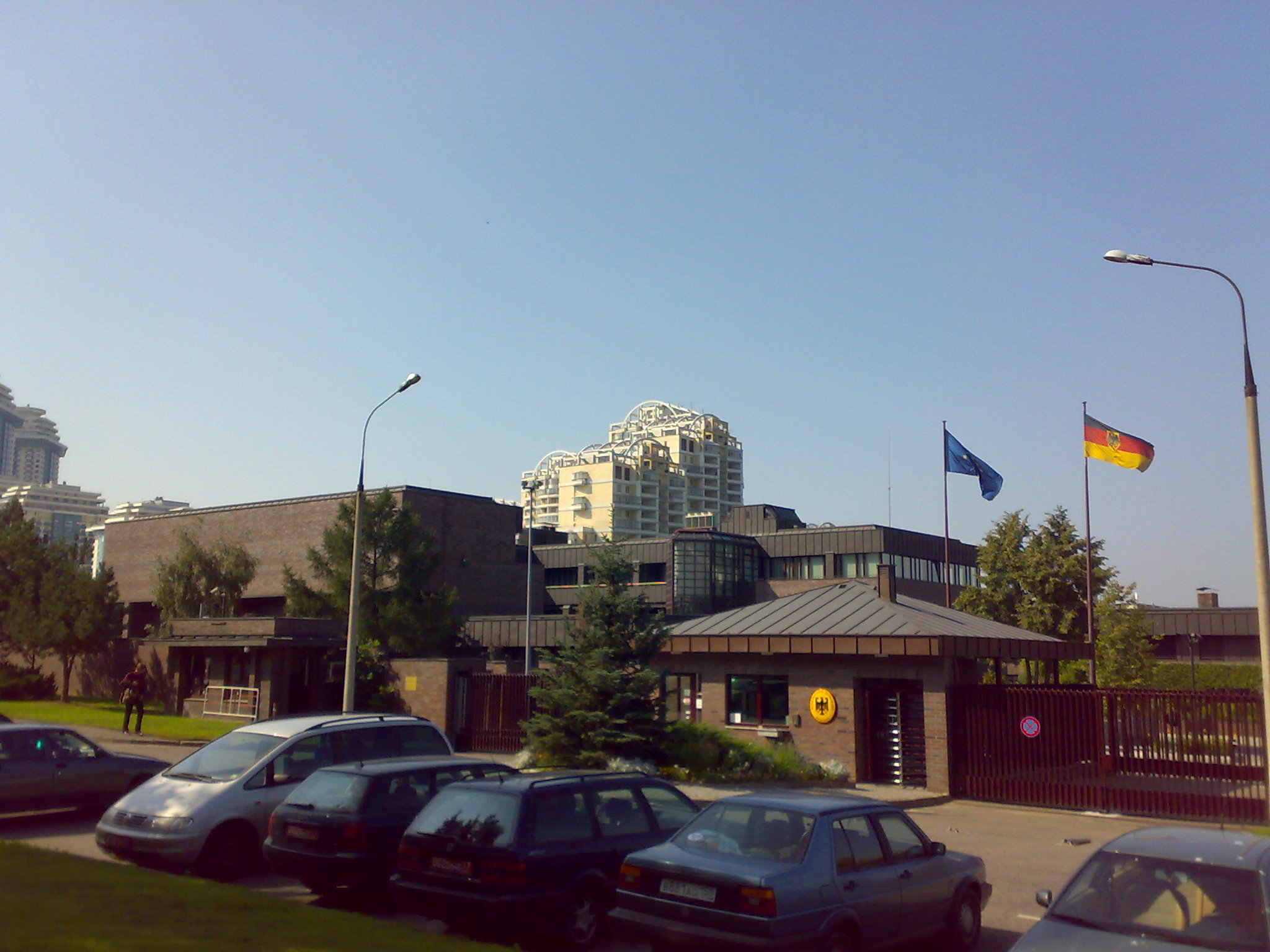
Embassy of the Federal Republic of Germany in Mosfilmovskaya Street, Moscow

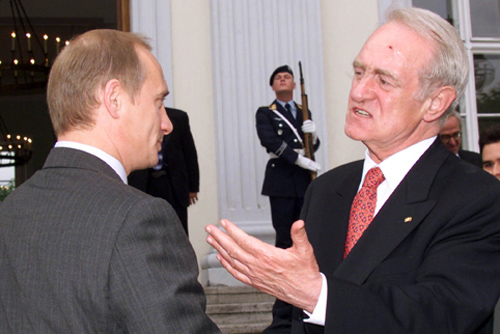
Vladimir Putin and German President Johannes Rau (right) in 2001

Relations between the two nations since the fall of Communism in 1990 have been generally good but not always without tension. German chancellor Gerhard Schröder placed high value on relations with Russia and worked for the completion of the Nord Stream 1 gas pipeline between them. His successor Angela Merkel, an Easterner and former dissident, has been more critical and clashed with Russian President Vladimir Putin over human rights and other issues. However, she, like her predecessor, always put a high value on the Nordstream pipeline, due to its ability to increase Russian influence. Most of the human rights issues could be seen as side-shows for the public - whilst the end-goal was always the completion of, and compensation for, NordStream. The project under both the Bush and Obama administration moved forward at rapid pace, but with only 300 km left, the Trump Administration halted the project by putting pressure on the Danish company overseeing the completion of the pipeline. Germany's relations with Russia were never likely to be as cozy under Angela Merkel as under her predecessor, Gerhard Schröder, who adopted a 3-year-old Russian girl and, on his 60th birthday, invited President Vladimir V. Putin home to celebrate.

Germany created a German-Russian Forum (German: Deutsch-Russisches Forum) in 1993. Alexandra Gräfin Lambsdorff was its first president.

=== 21st century ===
After the failure of the Soviet Union and troubles of the early Russian Federation, a policy of rapprochement named Wandel durch Handel ensued.

In 2007 then-Minister of Foreign Affairs Frank-Walter Steinmeier published a long article explaining his rationale on EU being such an exceptional role model on international cooperation that Putinite Russia will unavoidably get "like us" by merely "intertwining of interests" (Verflechtung), and also that "a pan-European peace order and a lasting solution to important security problems (…) can only be achieved with Russia, not without it or even against it".

Even after the five-day Russo-Georgian War in August 2008, Steinmeier argued for a new Ostpolitik and proposed a comprehensive project of ‘Partnership for Modernisation’ – a continued attempt of ‘westernisation’ of Russia and thus an export of norms, institutions and procedures of the western community. Relations were normal in the first part of the new century, with expanding trade relations and an increasing German reliance on pipeline shipments of Russian natural gas, especially in light of the November 2011 completion of the Nord Stream 1 pipeline. Generations of German foreign ministers helped over many years to admit Putin into the WTO, which occurred after a span of two decades in 2011.

Relations turned negative in 2014 in response to Russia's seizure of Crimea from Ukraine and support for insurgents in Ukraine. Germany was a leader between NATO Quint in imposing round after round of increasingly harsh sanctions against the Russian oil and banking industries and top allies of President Putin. Russia responded by cutting food imports from the EU.

Since the crisis began, Chancellor Angela Merkel told President Putin that the referendum on accession of Crimea to Russia is illegal.

=== 2014–2021 ===
The European Union, the United States and their allies began using economic sanctions to force Russia to reverse course regarding Ukraine and stop supporting 2014 pro-Russian unrest in Ukraine. The Los Angeles Times reported that:

Merkel and her fellow Western leaders are angered by Russia's actions in Ukraine, especially its seizure of Crimea, support for pro-Russia separatists in eastern Ukraine and fresh military incursion. Moscow's denial that it has any involvement in Ukraine's blood conflict only irks them more. The German chancellor has signaled a tougher stance toward Russia, spelling out her willingness to sacrifice German economic interests and further boost sanctions to send a strong message that Moscow's actions are unacceptable. [She said,] "Being able to change borders in Europe without consequences, and attacking other countries with troops, is in my view a far greater danger than having to accept certain disadvantages for the economy."

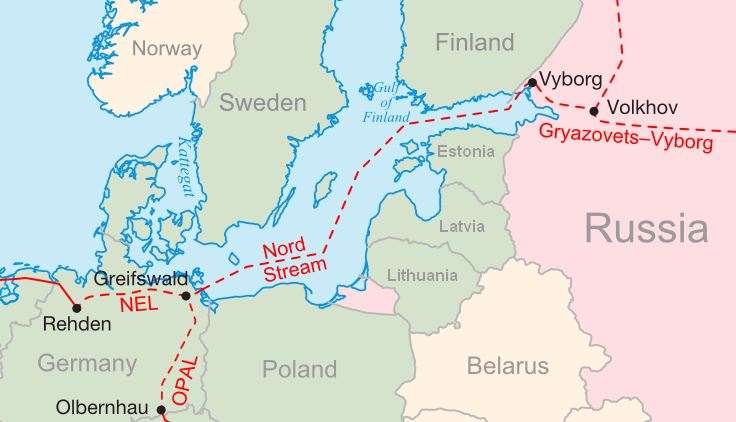
Nord Stream 1 natural gas pipeline, running under the Baltic Sea. Germany imported 50% to 75% of its natural gas from Russia.

On the left, however, former Social Democrat Chancellor Gerhard Schröder announced his understanding of Russian policies and support for Putin. The New York Times editorialized that Schröder's decision to "embrace him [Putin] in a bear hug sent an unacceptable signal that some prominent Europeans are willing to ignore Mr. Putin's brutish ways." According to the Russian news agency ITAR/TASS in September 2014, Russia's Prime Minister Dmitry Medvedev admitted the sanctions are hurting the Russian economy and slowing its growth. However he expected to support oil industries that are hurt, to seek financing and high technology from Asia, and to import food from new sources. Germany also tried to persuade Russia to return to the Treaty on Conventional Armed Forces in Europe, which it had abrogated in March 2015. Even as late as 2016, "German leaders rejected the proposal to send weapons to the Ukrainian government, as advocated by Republican congressmen in the US and treated as a possibility by Barack Obama, since pursuit of a military solution to the conflict collided with Germany’s post-war pacific security culture."

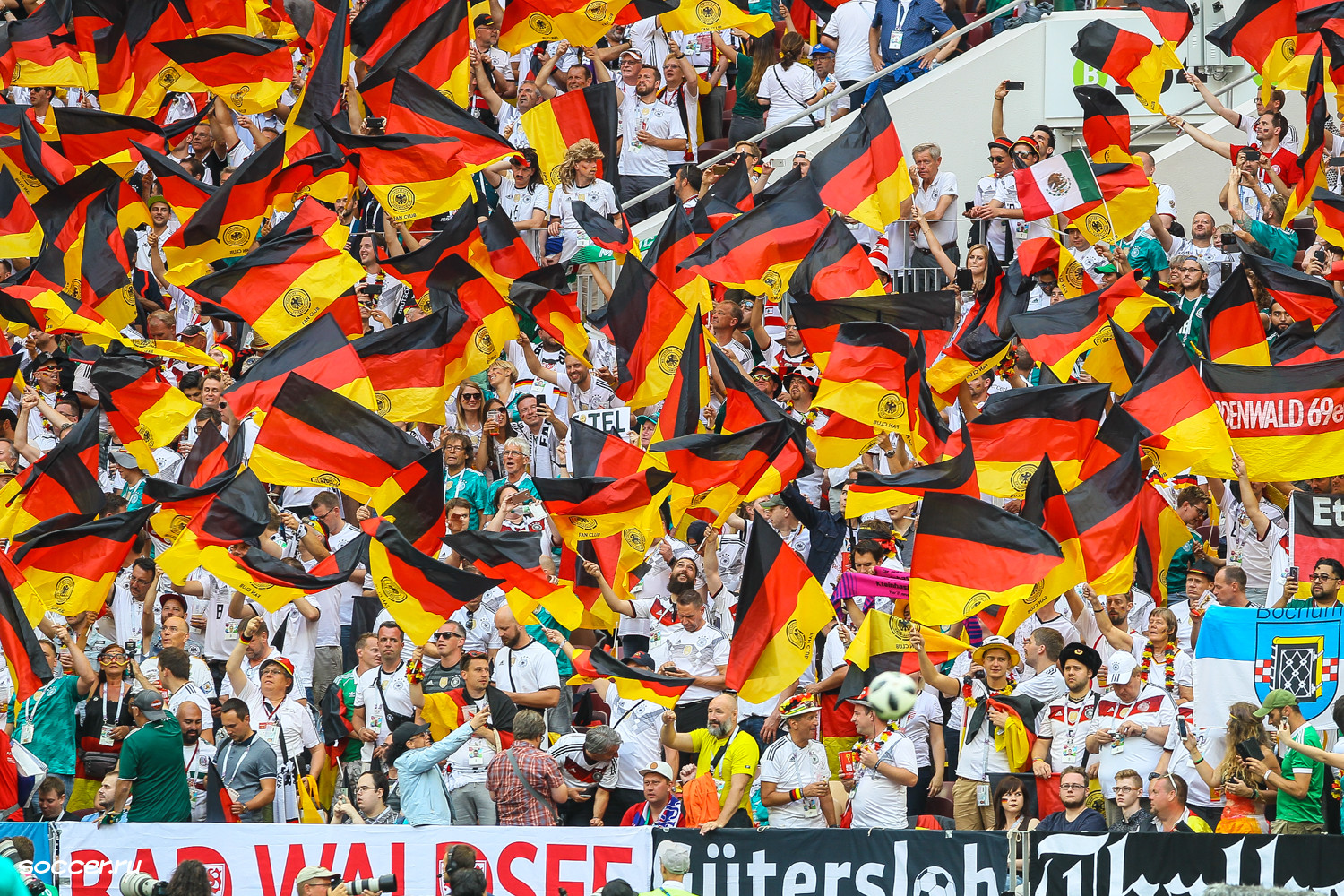
German fans at the 2018 FIFA World Cup in Russia

Germany has traditionally been one of Russia's key economic partners. The annual trade turnover between the two countries had exceeded the $80 billion-level just before the sanctions were imposed. It is estimated that mutual sanctions entailed the decline in the bilateral trade volume of up to 20% that meant billions of losses for the German economy and, obviously, many jobs being cut. By early 2014, when the conflict was about to start, not only did German exports to Russia constitute the third of the whole EU's, but more than 6,200 German firms operated in Russia itself. In 2017, for the first time since the introduction of anti-Russian sanctions in 2014, bilateral trade increased - by 22.8%, amounting to about $50 billion. In the first eight months of 2018, the volume of mutual trade between Russia and Germany increased by almost a quarter compared to the same period last year. At the same time, Russian exports to Germany in 2018 increased by 35% to $22.1 billion, while imports rose by 12% to $16.9 billion.

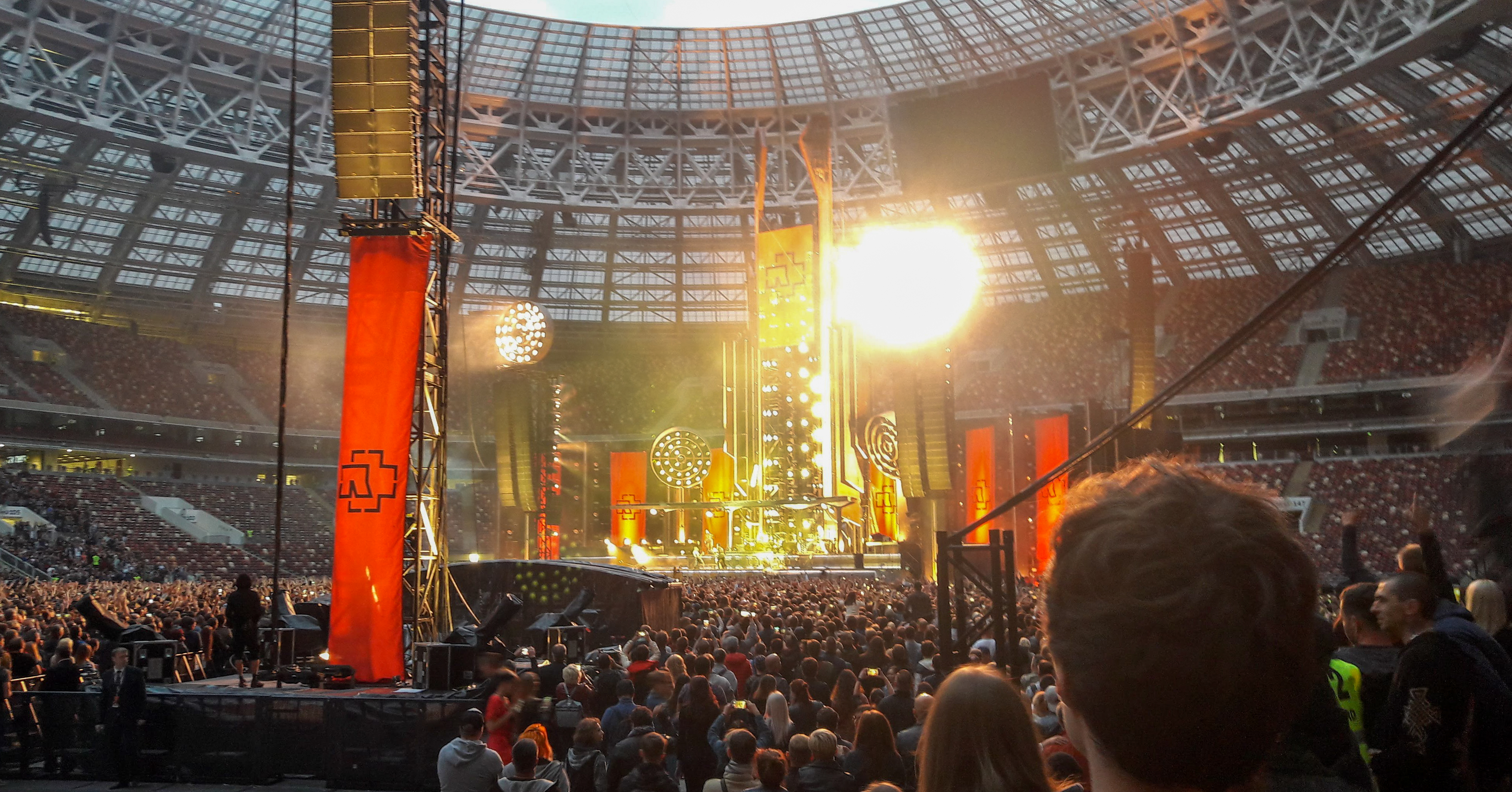
The Moscow concert by the German rock band Rammstein on 29 July 2019

A Levada poll released in August 2018 found that 68% of Russian respondents believe that Russia needs to dramatically improve relations with Western countries, including Germany. A Levada poll released in February 2020 found that 80% of Russian respondents believe that Russia and the West should become friends and partners.

The East StratCom Task Force of the European External Action Service registered an increase in false information propagated in Russia about Germany as a result of the deterioration in German-Russian relations developed since the Poisoning of Alexei Navalny.

In October 2021, German Defense Minister Annegret Kramp-Karrenbauer had talked about the possibility of deploying nuclear weapons against Russia. She noted that nuclear weapons are a "means of deterrence."

=== 2022–present ===
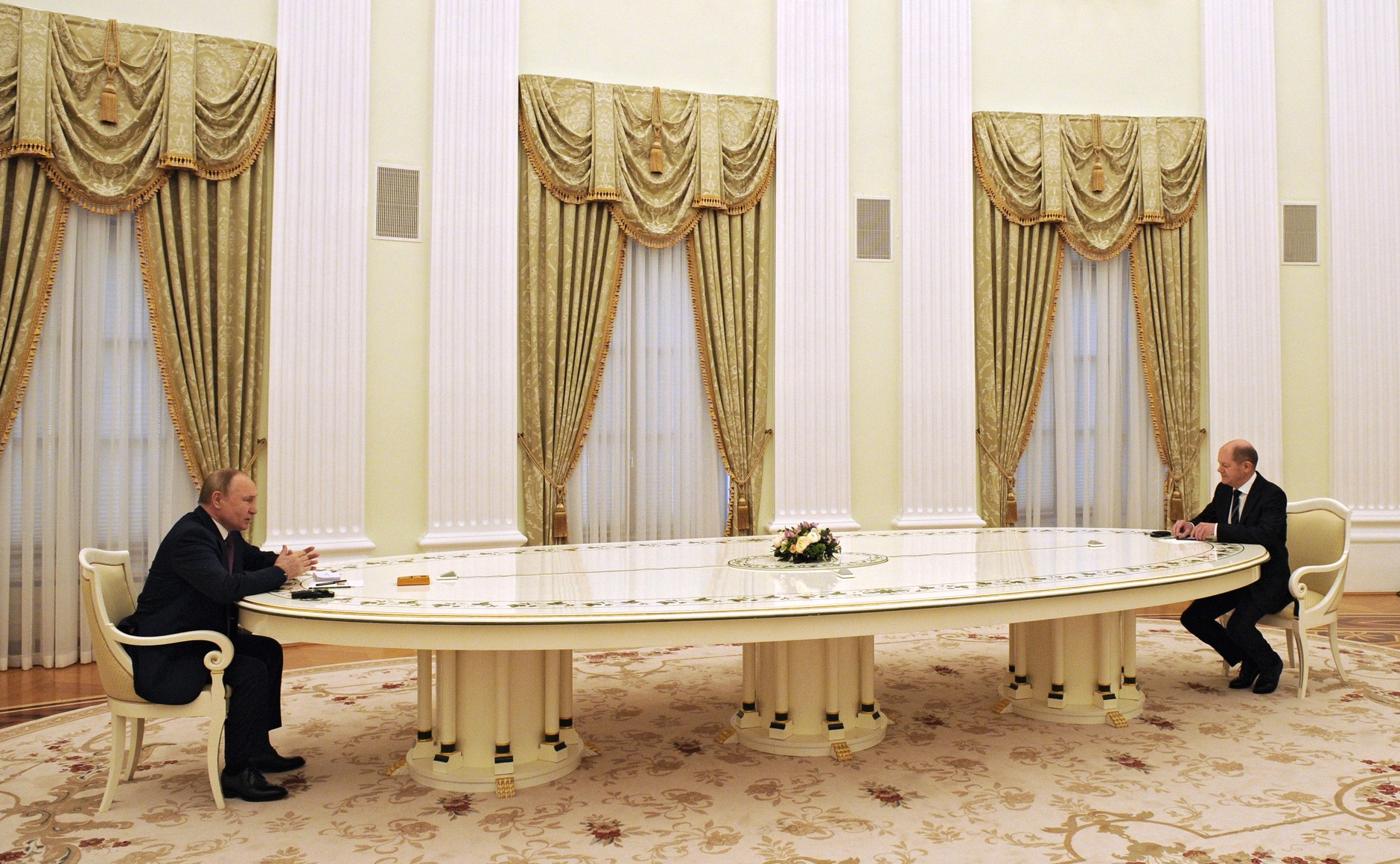
Putin's hypochondria on display as he meets with German chancellor Olaf Scholz on 15 February 2022

After the 2022 Russian invasion of Ukraine started, Germany, as one of the EU countries, imposed sanctions on Russia, and Russia added all EU countries to the list of "unfriendly nations". Germany joined other countries in spring 2022 in declaring a number of Russian diplomats persona non grata.

In April 2022, the German government said it will send 1 billion euros in military aid to Ukraine. On 17 May 2022, German Finance Minister Christian Lindner said he is "politically open to the idea of seizing" the frozen foreign-exchange reserves of the Central Bank of Russia —which amount to over $300 billion— to cover the costs of rebuilding Ukraine after the war. Russian Deputy Foreign Minister Alexander Grushko remarked that it would amount to "complete lawlessness", and that the measure would hurt Germany if adopted.

German Riol Chemie GmbH has allegedly illegally delivered chemicals to Russia, including precursor for Novichok.

By 1 September 2022, the actual volume of German arms deliveries to Ukraine was only exceeded by that of deliveries by the United States and the United Kingdom. In fall 2022, Russia had halted gas flows via the Nord Stream 1 pipeline several times, blaming international sanctions against Russia. This led to an upward jump in energy prices as Russia tried to use energy as a weapon to reduce support for Ukraine. Russia's foreign ministry blamed the United States for Germany's energy crisis, by pushing its leaders towards a "suicidal" step of cutting economic and energy cooperation with Moscow, which he claimed had been a reliable energy supplier since Soviet times, despite previous Russian-Ukrainian gas disputes having affected Russia's natural gas supply to Europe in 2006 and 2009.

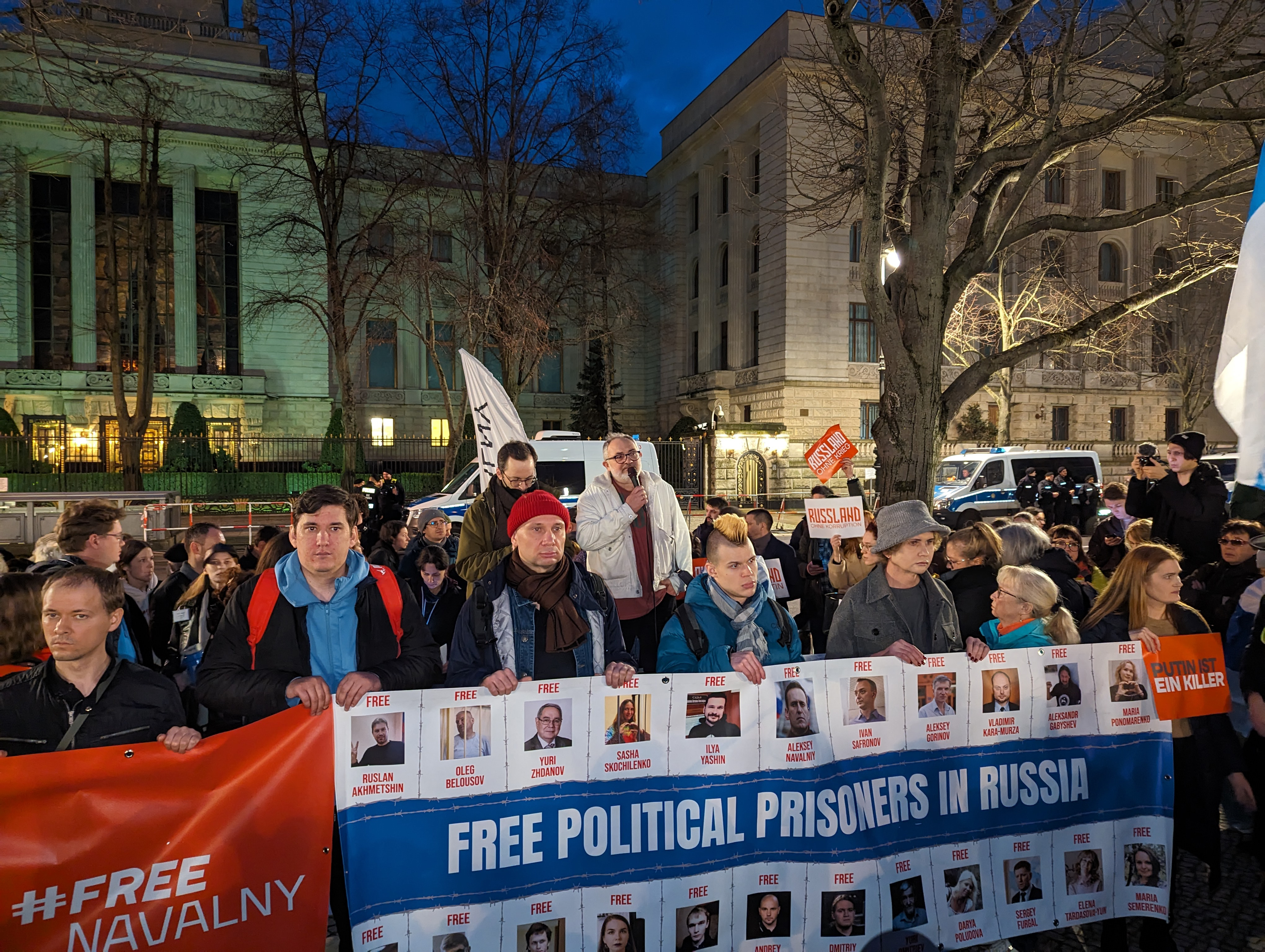
Protest outside the Russian Embassy in Berlin demanding the release of Russia's political prisoners, February 2024

A discussion on the legitimacy of economic sanctions against Russia took place. Parties to the right (AfD) and to the left (Die Linke) were split on the issue whether economic sanctions are effective to stop the conflict, and how they impact the German economy. Proponents of the right wanted to support the Nord Stream 2 pipeline, while politicians to the left have voiced similar concerns with regard to Germany's economic viability. The destruction of Nord Stream 2 in September 2022 changed the debate.

In January 2023, Scholz announced the decision to send Leopard 2 battle tanks to Ukraine. In April 2023, Germany expelled 50 Russian diplomats, the action was reportedly taken "in order to reduce the presence of Russian intelligence in Germany". Russia closed four of the five Russian Consulates in Germany. The Russian Ministry of Foreign Affairs responded by expelling 34 German diplomats from Moscow, stating that Germany "continues to demonstratively destroy the entire array of Russian-German relations". In May 2023, the German Foreign Ministry stated that hundreds of Germans would be expelled from Moscow at the beginning of June, this due to a decision by Russia to cap the number of German employees in the country. Those expelled include employees from the German School Moscow. Germany closed consulates general in Novosibirsk and Yekaterinburg on 1 December 2023, having already closed the one in Kaliningrad.

In 2022, Scholz stated that Russian deserters and draft evaders who refused to take part in the Russian invasion of Ukraine and fled Russia should be given protection in Germany. However, in 2024, German authorities ordered the deportation of Russian nationals who wanted to avoid mobilization and criticized Putin's government on the grounds that they would not face persecution in Russia.

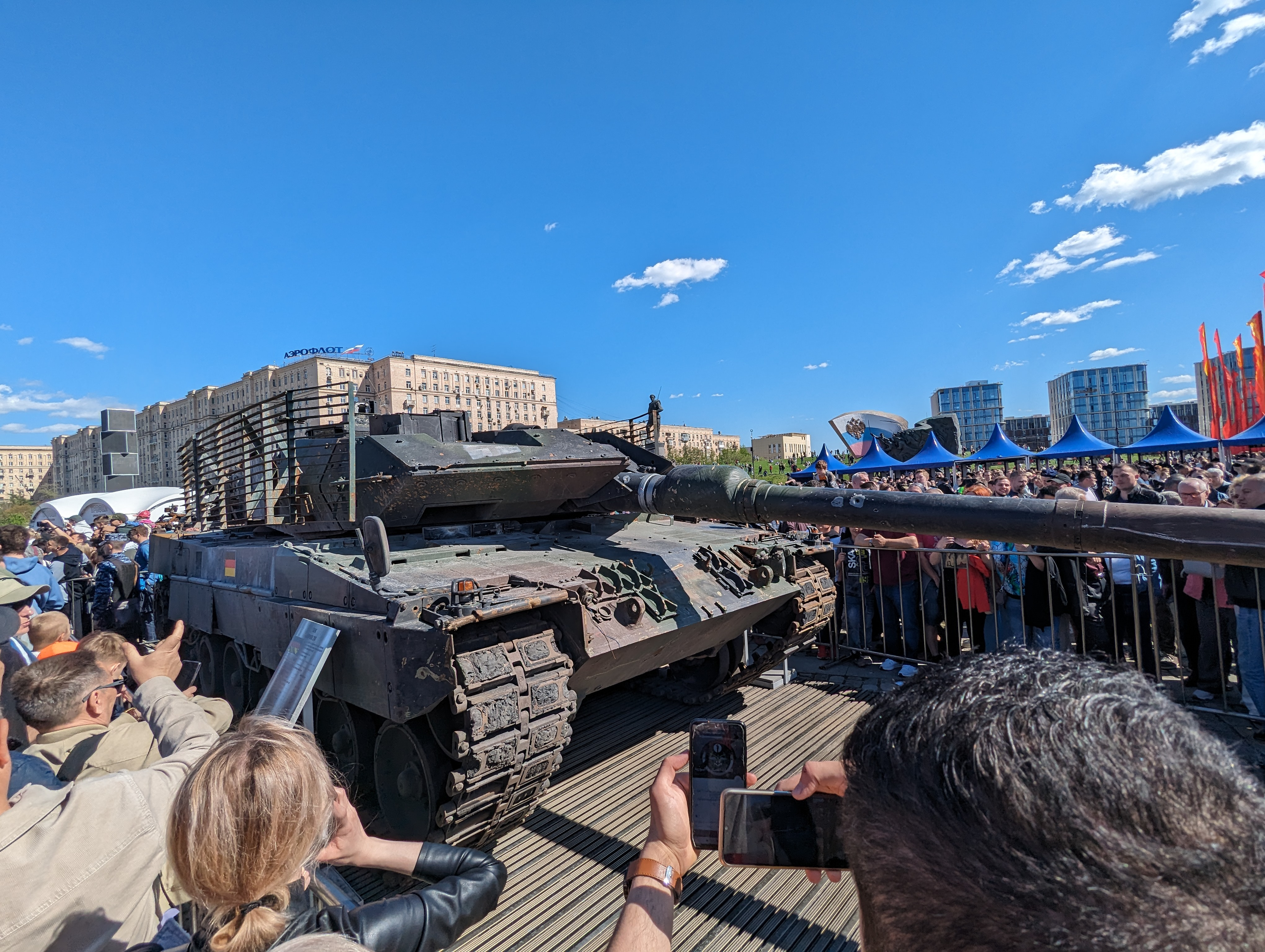
A captured German-supplied Leopard 2 main battle tank in Ukrainian service on display at Moscow's Victory Park on Poklonnaya Hill, 2024

In May 2024, Scholz gave Ukraine permission to strike targets inside Russia with German-supplied weapons.

In July 2024, the United States announced its intention to deploy long-range missiles in Germany from 2026 that could hit Russian territory within 10 minutes. In response, Russian President Putin warned of a Cold War-style missile crisis and threatened to deploy long-range missiles within striking distance of the West. US weapons in Germany would include SM-6 and Tomahawk cruise missiles and hypersonic weapons. The United States' decision to deploy long-range missiles in Germany has been compared to the deployment of Pershing II launchers in Western Europe in 1979. The decision was supported by German Chancellor Olaf Scholz and German Defense Minister Boris Pistorius. Critics say the move would trigger a new arms race. According to Russian military analysts, it would be extremely difficult to distinguish between a conventionally armed missile and a missile carrying a nuclear warhead, and Russia could respond by deploying longer-range nuclear systems targeting Germany.

The disruption of Germany–Russia relations has to do with the paradigm of "Wandel durch Handel" politics. In basic terms, Germany forged a useful economic relationship with Russia through the imports of natural resources under the chancellorship of Gerhard Schröder from 1998 to 2004. Subsequent to the Russia-Ukraine war, this model was abandoned and Germany experienced an economic decline due to strict economic sanctions against the Russian Federation, particularly in the energy sector.

== Trade ==
In 2021 German exports to Russia were $31.3 billion of goods with medication being the top export. Russian exports to Germany were valued at $19.2 billion with crude oil being the top item. Between 1995 and 2021 German exports rose on average by 6.22% p.a. with Russian exports rising by an average of 4.56% p.a.

In August 2023 German exports for the month were $736m and imports just $216m, proving the dramatic fall in trade between the two nations following the 2022 Russian invasion of Ukraine.

View source data.

== Russians in Germany ==
Since German reunification, Germany is home to a fast-growing and large community of people of Russian ancestry who have moved to Germany as full citizens. In the 1990s, some 100,000 to 200,000 arrived annually. Germany also has funded the communities that remain behind in Russia.

== Education ==
Russian international schools in Germany include the Russian Embassy School in Berlin and the Russian Consulate School in Bonn. There is a German school in Russia: German School Moscow.

== Resident diplomatic missions ==
- Germany has an embassy in Moscow.
- Russia has an embassy in Berlin.
  - List of ambassadors of Russia to Germany
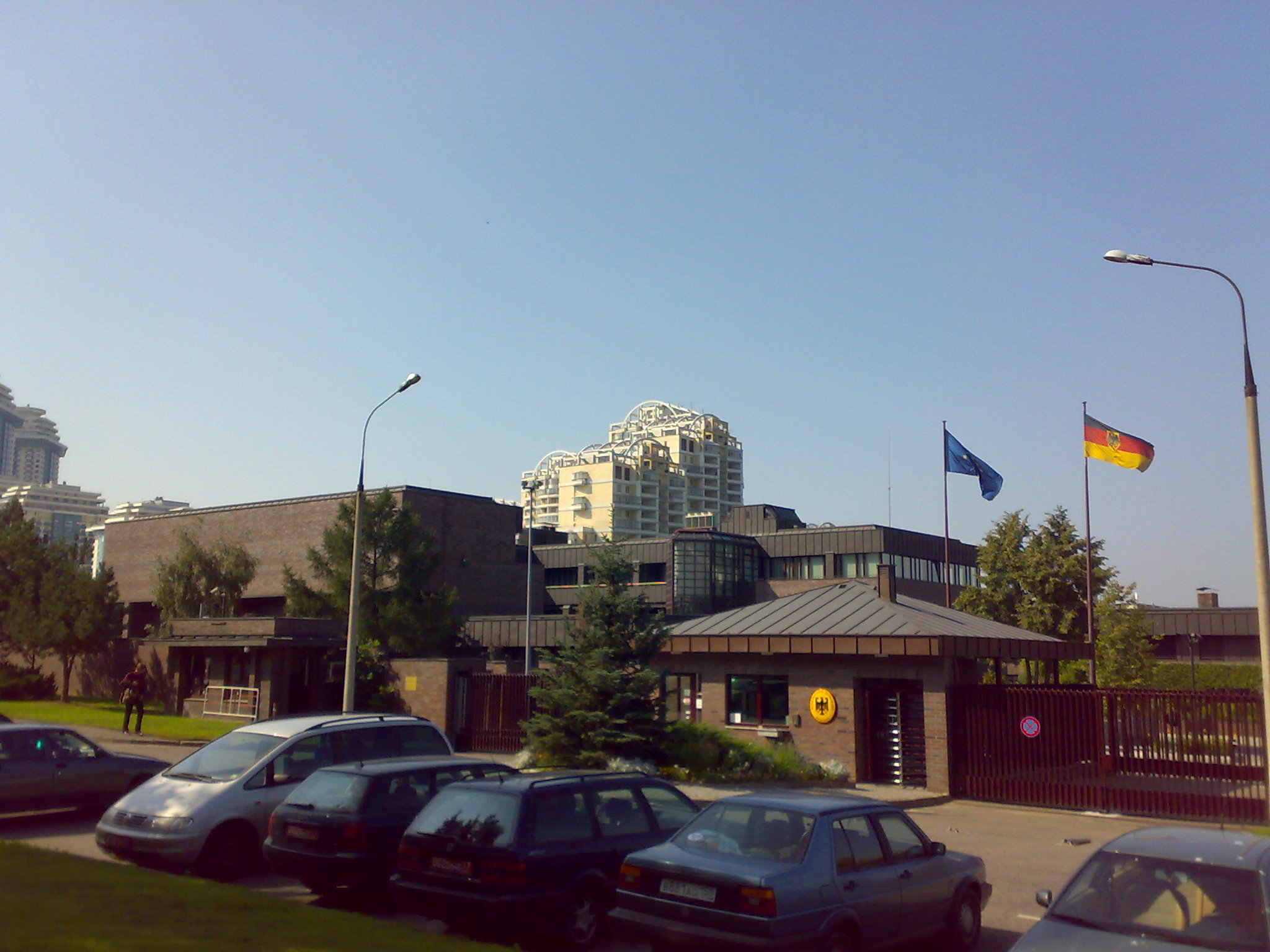
Embassy of Germany in Moscow

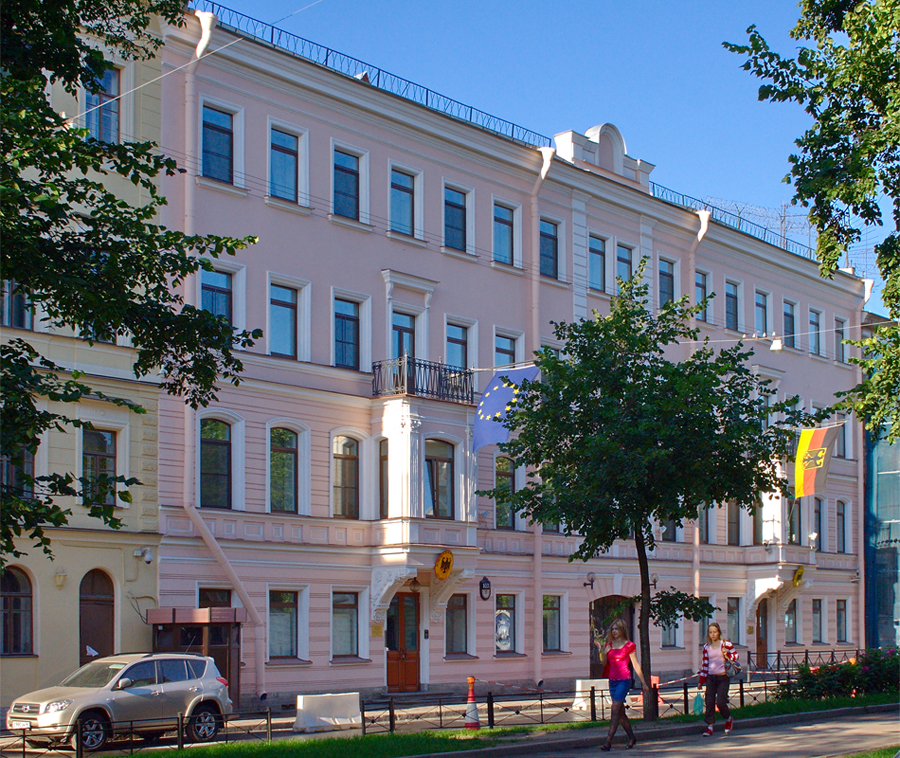
Consulate-General of Germany in Saint Petersburg

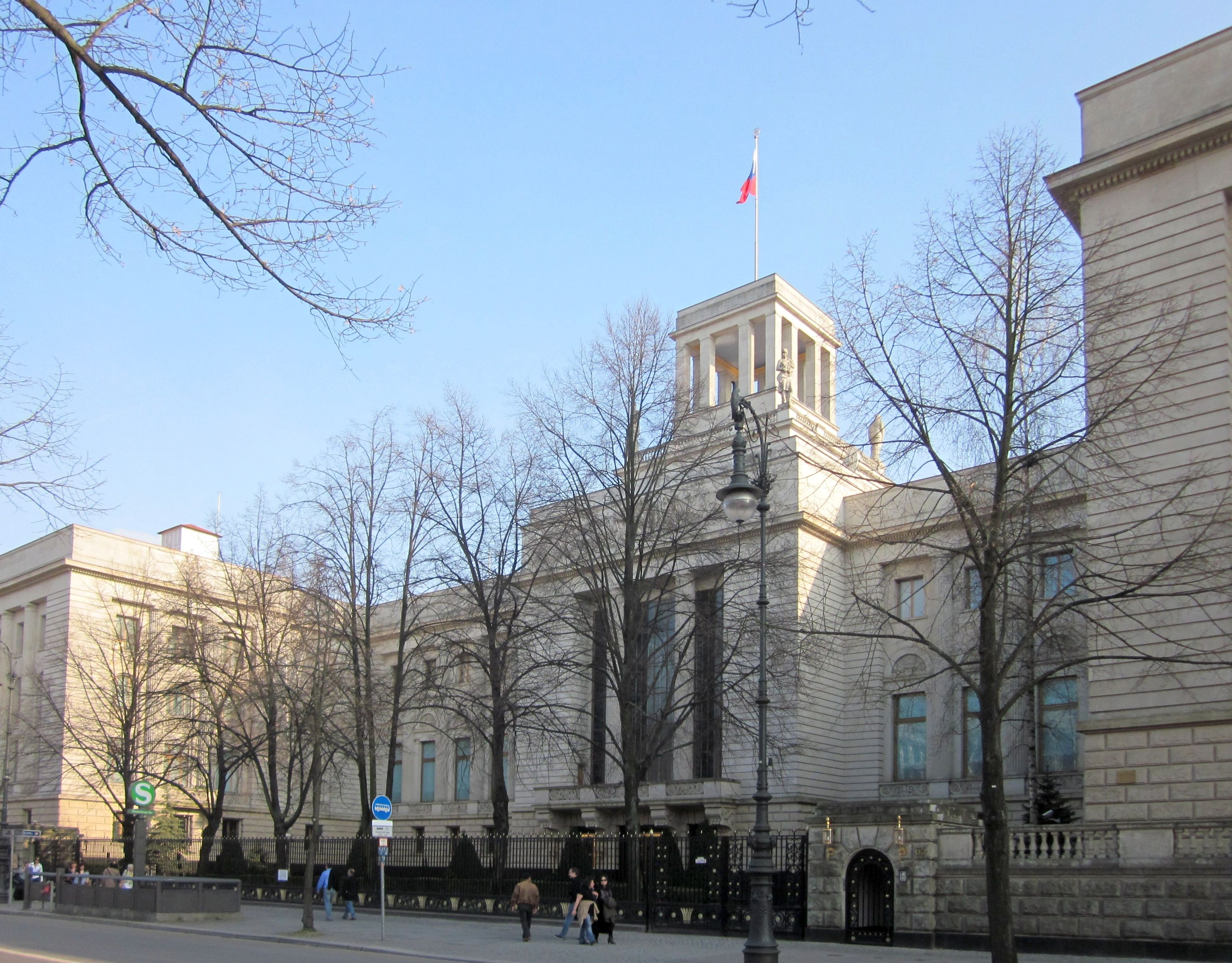
Embassy of Russia in Berlin

== See also ==
- Russia in the European energy sector
- Russian espionage in Germany
- Germany–Soviet Union relations before 1941
- Russian Prussia
- Cold War II
- Freistaat Preußen
