= Russian Embassy School in Berlin =

- Russian: Средняя общеобразовательная школа с углубленным изучением иностранного языка при Посольстве РФ в ФРГ (Берлин)

Information
- School type: International school
- Website: berlinschool.edusite.ru

The Russian Embassy School in Berlin (Russian: Средняя общеобразовательная школа с углубленным изучением иностранного языка при Посольстве РФ в ФРГ (Берлин), romanized: Srednyaya obshcheobrazovatel'naya shkola s uglublennym izucheniyem inostrannogo yazyka pri Posol'stve RF v FRG (Berlin)) is a Russian international school in Berlin, Germany, serving up to secondary school.

== See also ==
- Germany–Russia relations
- German School Moscow
