= Embassy of Russia, Berlin =

Embassy of Russia in Berlin
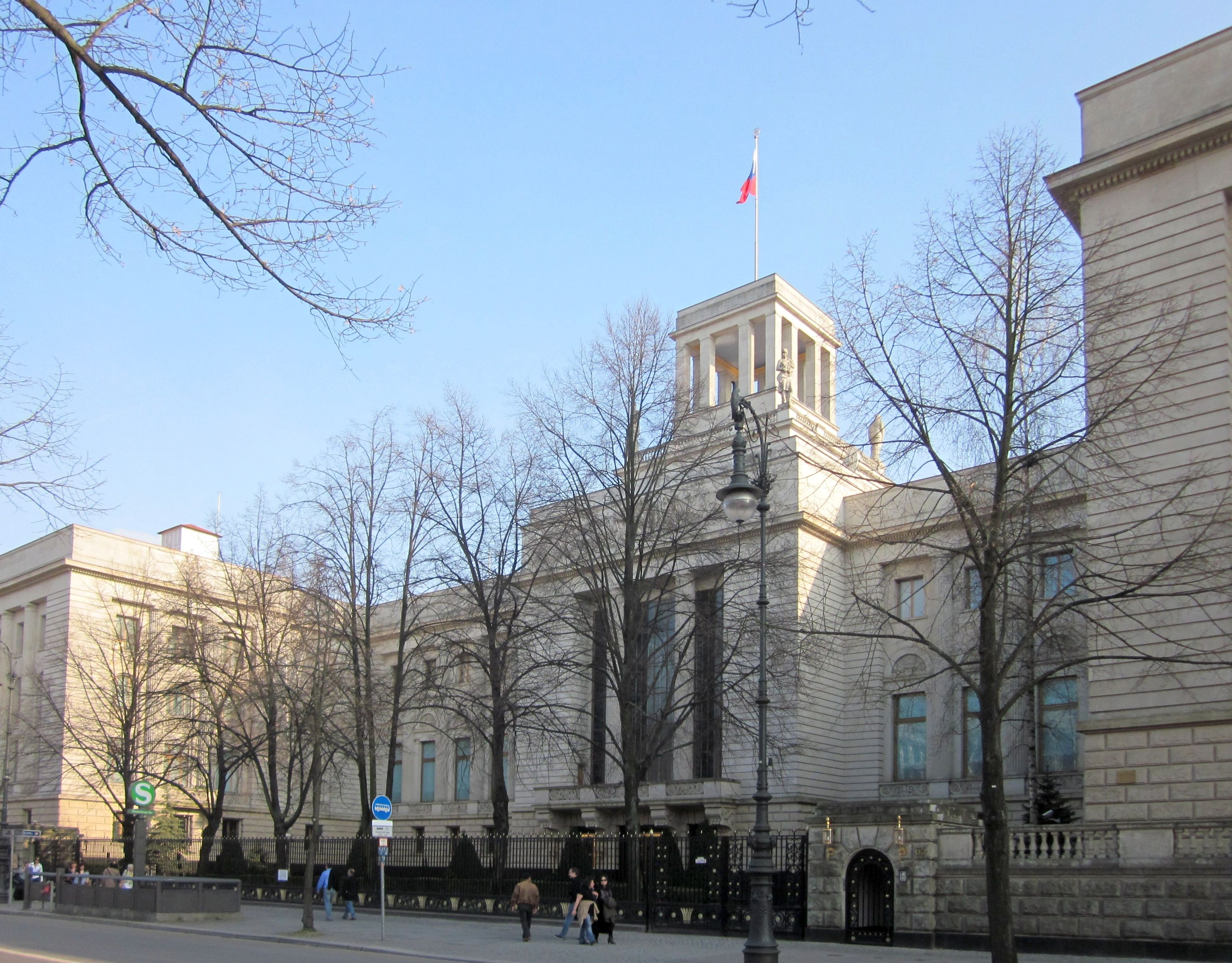
- The Russian Embassy in Germany in 2011
- Location: Mitte, Berlin, Germany
- Address: 63-65 Unter den Linden
- Coordinates: 52.5162°N 13.3835°E
- Ambassador: Sergey Nechaev

The Russian Embassy in Germany (German: Botschaft der Russischen Föderation in Deutschland; Russian: Посольство России в Германии, romanized: Posol'stvo Rossii v Germanii) is the headquarters of the diplomatic mission of the Russian Federation in Germany. It is located in the Mitte district of the capital Berlin and occupies a building complex consisting of the main building at 63-65 Unter den Linden and several administrative and residential buildings on the Behrenstraße and Glinkastraße.

The current Russian ambassador to Germany is Sergei Nechaev who was appointed on 10 January 2018.

== History ==
=== Before the GDR ===
A permanent diplomatic mission was initially established by the Tsardom of Russia in Berlin in 1706, at the time the capital of the Kingdom of Prussia. It moved to the Palais Kurland on Unter den Linden in 1832 after the building was purchased by Tsar Nicholas I and served as the embassy to the German Empire until closed at the outbreak of the First World War in 1914. It was reopened as the embassy of the Russian Soviet Federative Socialist Republic in 1917 and then of the Soviet Union from 1922. Upon the German invasion of the Soviet Union in 1941, the embassy became an internment camp before being occupied by the Reich Ministry for the Occupied Eastern Territories from 1942. The Palais Kurland was destroyed by bombing raids in Berlin during the Second World War.

=== During the GDR ===
The Soviet Union constructed the current embassy building, three times larger than the Palais Kurland with neighbourland of destroyed Hotel Bristol and combining both Russian and Soviet architecture, which opened on 7 November 1952 to celebrate October Revolution Day. It was built in East Berlin to serve as the Soviet embassy to East Germany, as the site of the Kurland Palace was located in the Soviet Occupation Zone after the war. In 1961 the Berlin Wall was constructed a short distance from the embassy. Following the reunification of Germany in 1990 and the dissolution of the Soviet Union in 1991, the embassy was inherited by the Federal Republic of Germany and the Russian Federation, respectively.

=== After the GDR ===
On 5 November 2021, it was revealed that a Russian diplomat had died at the embassy, apparently having fallen out of a higher story of the building. It was later revealed by Der Spiegel that German intelligence services believed he was an FSB agent, and Bellingcat stated that he was the son of a senior FSB official.

In 2022, Russia attacked Ukraine and diplomatic relations between Russia and Germany were limited to the bare minimum. Germany expelled a total of 40 Russian diplomats in April 2022 and another 30 in 2023. This apparently included almost the entire technical staff of the secret services. In 2023, Russia reduced its total representation in Germany to officially 350 people (including diplomats, teachers, and employees at foundations). The German federal government ordered the closure of consulates. Russia decided to only operate the embassy in Berlin and the consulate general in Bonn.

German counterintelligence estimates that up to a third of Russia's diplomatic staff are actually agents. Security circles say that in the post-2022 situation, Russian accredited diplomatic staff in Austria are involved in operations in Germany. The Austrian Nehammer government did not take part in the extensive expulsions of Russian embassy staff up from 2022. As of 2024, only eight members of the Russian intelligence community have had to leave Austria, although it is estimated that there are up to 100 Russian agents in Vienna who are accredited as diplomats.

It is assumed that the Bonn consulate has extensive interception and communications technology close to the German military central command on Hardthöhe.
