= Family of Vladimir Putin =

Putin Путин
- Origin: Tver, Tsardom of Russia
- Founded: 17th century
- Members: List: Spiridon Putin; Vladimir Putin; Maria Vorontsova; Katerina Tikhonova; Igor Putin; Roman Putin
- Connected members: List: Lyudmila Putina; Jorrit Faassen; Kirill Shamalov; Svetlana Krivonogikh; Alina Kabaeva; Sergey Tsivilyov
- Connected families: List: Shelomov; Chursanov; Buyanov; Fomin

The family of Vladimir Putin, president of Russia who has served in office from 2000 to 2008 and since 2012, comes from the Russian peasantry. Spiridon Putin (1879–1965) was a cook in Gorky (now known as Nizhny Novgorod), his son Vladimir Spiridonovich (1911–1999) participated in World War II, and grandson Vladimir Vladimirovich (born 1952) made a career in the KGB and the FSB, before being appointed chairman of the Russian government in 1999 and becoming president. In 1983, Putin married Lyudmila Aleksandrovna Shkrebneva, who gave birth to two daughters, Maria (1985) and Katerina (1986). They divorced in 2014.

== Origin ==
Putins and related families (Shelomovs, Chursanovs, Buyanovs, Fomins and others) have been peasants of the Tver district since at least the 17th century. The earliest known ancestor of Vladimir Putin was mentioned in 1627–1628 in the scribe book of this county – was Yakov Nikitin, a peasant from the village of Borodino, the parish of the village of Turginovo, the estate of the boyar Ivan Nikitich Romanov (Uncle of Tsar Michael Fedorovich).

== Parents and siblings ==
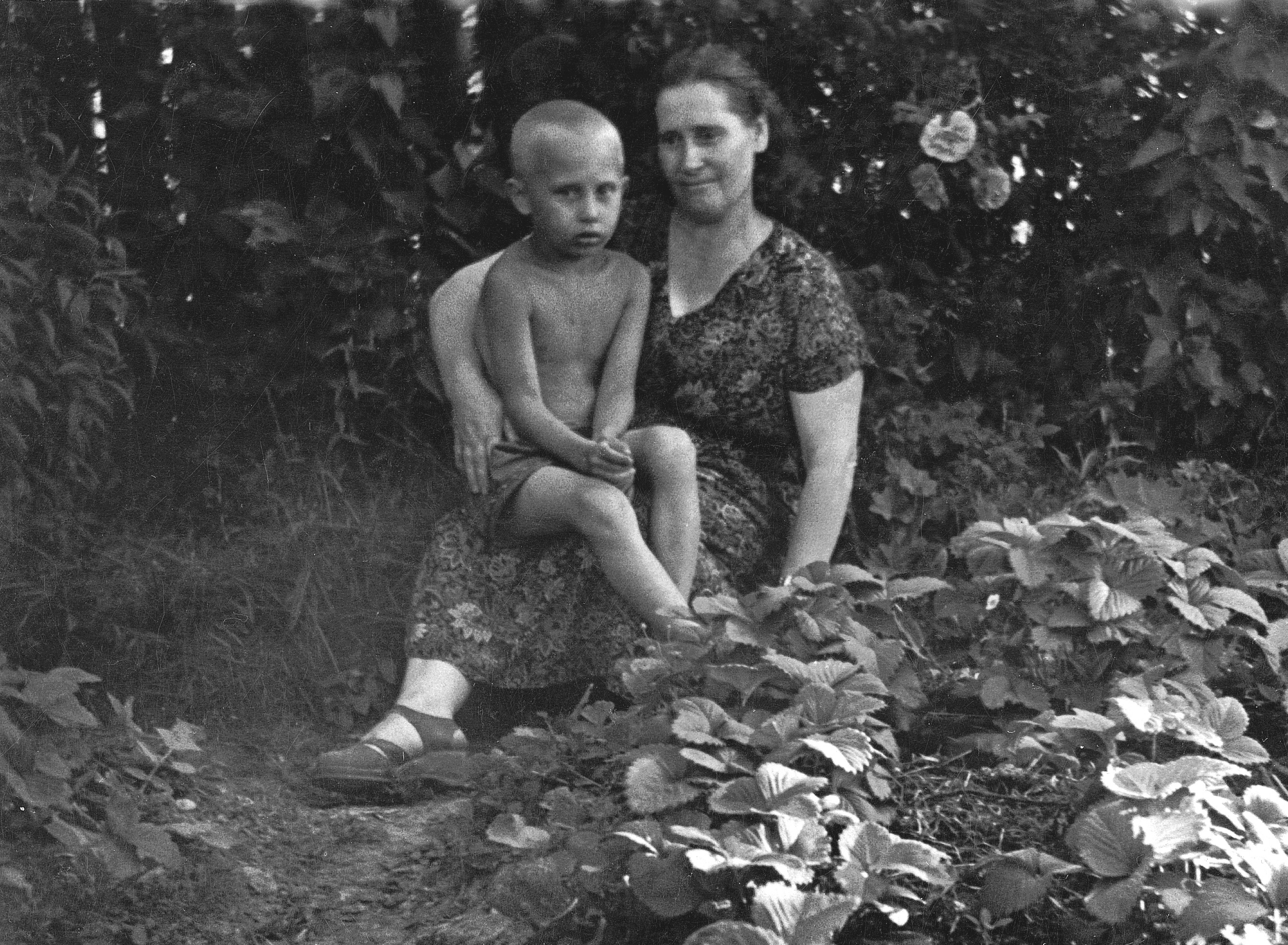
Five-year-old Vladimir Putin with his mother, Maria, in July 1958

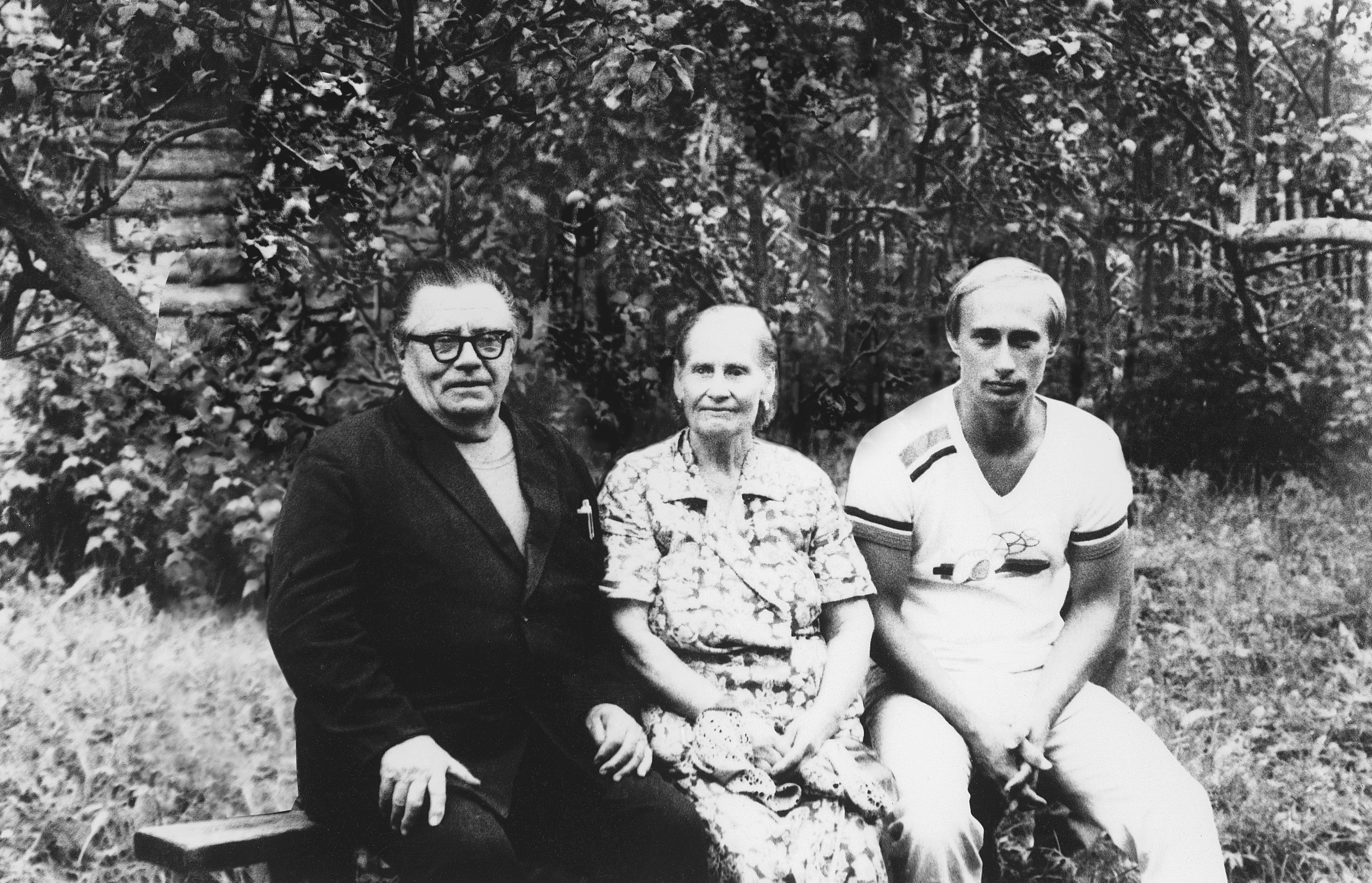
Vladimir Putin (right) with his parents in 1985

Putin was born on 7 October 1952 in Leningrad, Soviet Union (now Saint Petersburg, Russia), the youngest of three children of Vladimir Spiridonovich Putin (1911–1999) and Maria Ivanovna Putina (née Shelomova; 1911–1998). His grandfather, Spiridon Putin (1879–1965), was a personal chef to Vladimir Lenin and Joseph Stalin. Putin's birth was preceded by the deaths of two brothers: Albert, born in the 1930s, died in infancy, and Viktor, born in 1940, died of diphtheria and starvation in 1942 during the Siege of Leningrad by Nazi Germany's forces in World War II.

Putin's mother was a factory worker, and his father was a conscript in the Soviet Navy, serving in the submarine fleet in the early 1930s. During the early stage of the Nazi invasion of the Soviet Union, his father served in the destruction battalion of the NKVD. Later, he was transferred to the regular army and was severely wounded in 1942. Putin's maternal grandmother was killed by the German occupiers of Tver region in 1941, and his maternal uncles disappeared on the Eastern Front during World War II.

== Marriage and children ==
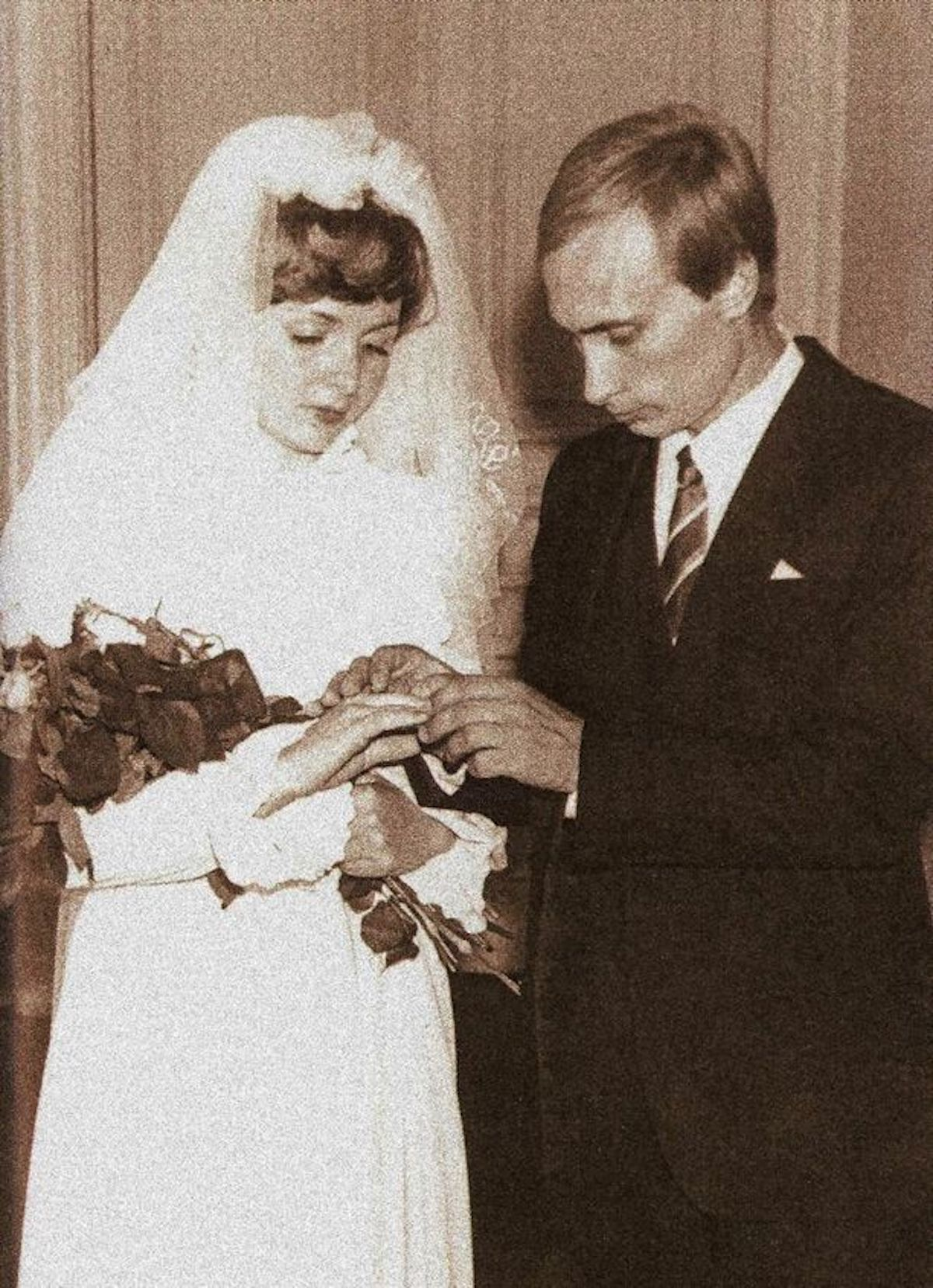
Putin's wedding, 1983

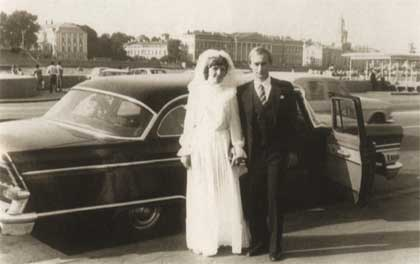
Wedding of Vladimir Putin and Lyudmila Shkrebneva, 1983

In 1983, Vladimir Vladimirovich Putin married Lyudmila Alexandrovna Shkrebneva (later a graduate of the philological faculty of Leningrad University, a teacher of German). In 1985, a daughter, Maria, was born in this family, and in 1986 they had a second daughter, Katerina (both were named after their grandmothers). They studied at the St. Petersburg private gymnasium Petershule (Peterschule), with in-depth study of the German language, then for two years at the German School Moscow.

Since 2000, for safety reasons, Putin's daughters have completely switched to homeschooling. It is known that they take fitness and wushu classes, and that they are fluent in English, German, and French and Maria also speaks Dutch. Katerina also knows Korean.

On 6 June 2013, Putin and Lyudmila announced that they were planning to divorce; on 1 April 2014, their marriage was formally annulled.

It is widely believed that Putin has fathered at least three illegitimate children: a daughter and two sons. Elizaveta Vladimirovna Rozova, who is also known as Elizaveta Krivonogikh, Luiza Rozova and Elizaveta Olegovna Rudnova, was born in 2003 and lives in Paris. Her mother is Svetlana Krivonogikh, a former cleaning woman who worked for Putin while he was still married to Lyudmila. She alleges that Putin is her father, a claim that neither Putin nor the Kremlin have disputed. Svetlana Krivonogikh went from being a cleaning woman to now owning luxury properties in multiple countries. Alina Kabaeva, with whom Putin has had a relationship since at around 2000, has two sons who are widely presumed to be Putin's.

== Literature ==
- Sakwa, Richard (2008). Putin: Russia's choice. London; New York: Routledge. ISBN 978-0-203-93193-6. OCLC 183404357.
- Геворкян Н. П., Тимакова Н. А., Колесников А. И. (2000). От первого лица. Разговоры с Владимиром Путиным. Вагриус. ISBN 5-264-00257-6.
