= Putin (surname) =

Putin (Russian: Путин) is a masculine Russian surname. Its feminine counterpart is Putina (Russian: Путина). Notable people with the surname include:

- Grisha Putin (born 2006), Russian gaming influencer and nationalist
- Igor Putin (born 1953), Russian businessman and politician, cousin of Vladimir Putin
- Lyudmila Putina (born 1958), the former wife of Vladimir Putin
- Maria Putina (born 1985), Russian pediatric endocrinologist
- Roman Putin (born 1977), Russian businessman and politician, nephew of Vladimir Putin
- Spiridon Putin (1879–1965), Russian chef who was the personal cook of Lenin and Stalin, paternal grandfather of Vladimir Putin
- Vera Putina (1926–2023), Georgian woman who claimed to be Vladimir Putin's mother
- Vladimir Putin (born 1952), President of Russia from 2000 to 2008 and from 2012–present, Prime Minister of Russia from 1999 to 2000 and 2008 to 2012

== Fictional people ==
- Ivan Putin, Soviet Navy political officer in The Hunt for Red October

== See also ==
- Putina (disambiguation)
- Putinas
