= Roman Tsepov =

Russian businessman (1962–2004)

- Роман Цепов
- Born: 22 July 1962; Kolpino, Leningrad Oblast, Russian SFSR, Soviet Union
- Died: 24 September 2004 (aged 42); Saint Petersburg, Russia

Roman Igorevich Tsepov (Russian: Роман Игоревич Цепов; 22 July 1962 – 24 September 2004) was a Russian businessman and confidant to Vladimir Putin during Putin's work at the Saint Petersburg City Administration. Tsepov was suspected of corruption and criminal activity.

== Biography ==
Born Belinson, Tsepov changed his surname upon marriage to Tsepov. His father was an engineer at the Izhora plant in Kolpino and his mother was a law enforcement officer, a doctor. Upon graduation from the Supreme Political school of the Ministry of Internal Affairs of the USSR, Tsepov served in the Internal Troops as a political commissar. In 1990, he retired from the Ministry of Internal Affairs at the rank of captain.

== Baltic Escort ==
In November 1992, Tsepov had a 60% stake and Igor Koreshkov Leningrad department of the KGB from 1980 to 1990 and is a career Chekist. Then, he transferred to the Ministry of Internal Affairs with the rank of senior lieutenant.}} had a 40% stake in founding the security firm Baltic Escort which became the largest security firm in St. Petersburg. The idea to create this agency belonged to the future Putin bodyguard Viktor Zolotov who later oversaw this agency as a member of the active reserve. The firm provided protection to high ranking Saint Petersburg officials, including the city mayor Anatoly Sobchak and his family, as well as the vice-mayor Vladimir Putin. In this role, Tsepov also acted as an "intermediary between Putin and business" through which Baltic Escort collected the "black cash" (Russian: "черный нал"). At the same time, Baltic Escort rendered security services to a number of criminal leaders, in particular Aleksandr Malyshev, the leader of "Malyshev's gang" and his family and several figures of the Tambov Gang. (Note: Boris Chalov (Russian: Борис Чалов; born 1959, Lenningrad) began working at Baltic Escort in 1995. As of April 2025, Chalov has been an adjutant of Vladimir Putin for twenty years. Adjutants play a key role in the governance of Russia under Putin: They are part of the Presidential Security Service (SBP FSO), which is under the Federal Protective Service (FSO), and are next to the Russian leader at all times. Other adjutants of Putin since 2019 include Ivan Rozhkov (Russian: Иван Рожков), Andrei Lastovetsky (Russian: Андрей Ластовецкий), Alexei Melnikov (Russian: Алексей Мельников), Konstantin Panin (Russian: Константин Панин), Sergei Moskalenko (Russian: Сергей Москаленко), Alexander Sevryukov (Russian: Александр Севрюков) and Boris Chalov. Although not an adjutant, Evgeniy Burdeiny (Russian: Евгений Бурдейный) is an employee of the Russian Presidential Security Service (SBP) of the FSO in 2010 that supported Maria Vorontsova and Jorrit Faassen.)

== Criminal activity ==
In 1994, Tsepov was arrested on charges of illegal storage of weapons and drugs. It is rumoured that the real reason for the arrest was the collection of "protection" money to secure gambling licenses from the city office of Vladimir Putin. Starting in 1993, there were five unsuccessful attempts on Roman Tsepov's life. His name appears in several criminal investigations, the last one being in March 1998 on charges of extortion of 70 thousand dollars. Tsepov went into hiding and fled to the Czech Republic.

== Prominent businessmen ==
Upon Vladimir Putin's coming to power, Tsepov became one of the most influential figures in the financial and political life of Saint Petersburg. He took part in the first presidential inaugural ceremony of Vladimir Putin. Tsepov's power and influence were attributed to his close association with then Minister of Internal Affairs Rashid Nurgaliyev, the chief of Presidential Security Service Viktor Zolotov (Zolotov attended Tsepov's funeral) and deputy head of presidential administration Igor Sechin. He was also affiliated with Saint Petersburg branches of the Russian Ministry of Internal Affairs and FSB. Journalists named Roman Tsepov "a security oligarch". Regarding all this real or rumored activity, Tsepov stated: "For some reason all the time Tsepov appeared to be the most convenient figure for rumors. Elections – Tsepov. Criminal investigations, tranches, credits, fuel business, security, a casino – Tsepov. Personnel rearrangements – me too. The grey cardinal necessarily should exist at a king's court". In the summer of 2004, Tsepov was rumored to attempt to mediate between the government and YUKOS.

== Death by poisoning ==
On 11 September 2004, Tsepov visited colleagues at a local FSB office where he had a cup of tea. On the same day, he felt unwell after which a very serious disease developed with symptoms such as vomiting, diarrhoea and a sudden drop of white blood cells. Treated in Hospital 31 in Saint Petersburg, he died on 24 September. A postmortem investigation found poisoning by an unspecified radioactive material. He had symptoms similar to Aleksander Litvinenko.

== Film and television ==
After playing a small part in Vladimir Bortko's mini-series Banditskiy Peterburg: Advokat (2000) Tsepov co-produced Bortko's My Honor (2004). The series was awarded a TEFI, the highest television award in Russia, as best film.

== Personal ==
He was close to Alexandra Tsepova, who was believed to be his wife, however, a close acquaintance believes that Alexandra only changed her last name to Tsepova from her maiden name. Alexandra Tsepova sold her apartment to Dina Tsilevich (Russian: Дина Цилевич; born 1968 or 1969) who is a close friend of Svetlana Krivonogikh, allegedly owns the building at which Baltic Escort is headquartered, and is allegedly the mother of Viktor Zolotov's son.

== See also ==
- Aleksandr Litvinenko

== Books ==
- Dawisha, Karen (2014). Putin's Kleptocracy: Who Owns Russia?. Simon & Schuster. ISBN 978-1-4767-9519-5.
