= Putin (disambiguation) =

Vladimir Putin (born 1952) is a Russian politician and former intelligence officer who is the president of Russia.

Putin may also refer to:

- Putin (surname), includes a list of people with the name
- PuTin or Puin, Russian brand of vegetable and mushrooms canned goods
- Putin vodka, Lithuanian vodka
- Putin (film), a 2025 Polish biographical film
- "Putin" (Randy Newman song), 2016 American song

== See also ==
- Poutine, food dish
- Putinka, Russian vodka
