= Ochyorsky =

Ochyorsky (masculine), Ochyorskaya (feminine), or Ochyorskoye (neuter) may refer to:

- Ochyorsky District, a district of Perm Krai, Russia
- Ochyorskoye Urban Settlement, a municipal formation which the town of Ochyor in Ochyorsky District of Perm Krai, Russia is incorporated as
