= Vera Putina =

Alleged mother of Vladimir Putin (1926–2023)

- Вера Николаевна Путина
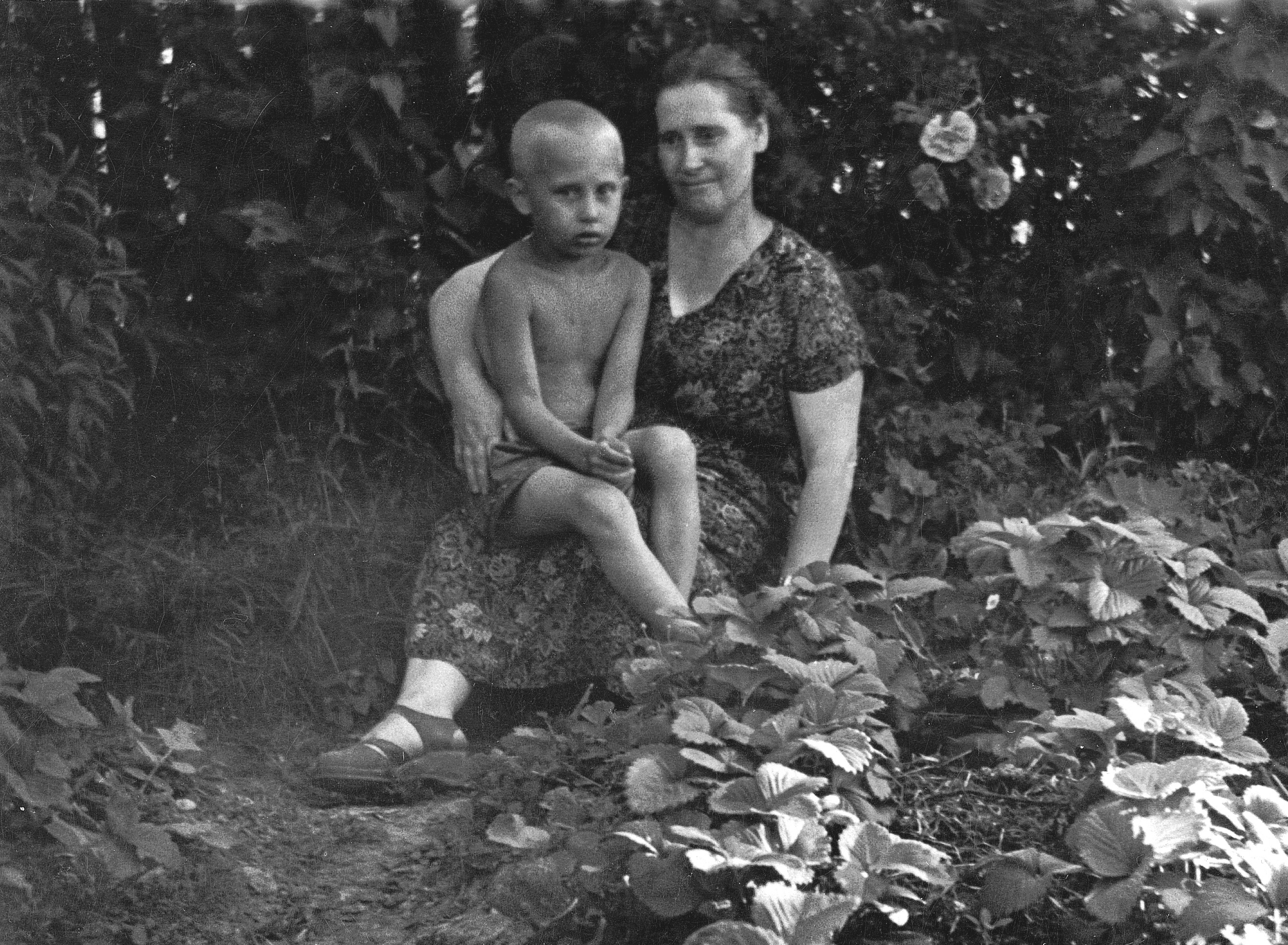
- Allegedly Vladimir Putin with his mother, Maria Ivanovna Putina (née Shelomova), in July 1958; two years before Vera Putina claims he was sent to his grandparents in Russia.
- Born: 6 September 1926; Terekhino, near Ochyor, Perm Krai, Soviet Union
- Died: 30 May 2023 (aged 96); Tbilisi, Georgia

Vera Nikolaevna Putina (Russian: Вера Николаевна Путина; 6 September 1926 – May 2023) was a Georgian woman who, from 1999, stated that Vladimir Putin ("Vova") is her son. The woman's claims contrast with Putin's official biography, which states that Putin's parents died before he became president. The Telegraph concluded that while the woman might be simply wrong or part of a public relations effort, the story "identifies the holes in the known story of Mr. Putin's past". The official story is that Putin's parents were already in their forties when Putin was born, which leaves a gap of over ten years since the births of their previous sons, Albert and Viktor, neither of whom survived childhood. Details of the first ten years of Putin's life are scarce in his autobiography, especially when compared with other world leaders.

Putina was born in the village of Terekhino near Ochyor, Perm Krai in the Soviet Union. She lived in the village of Metekhi, a village in Kaspi Municipality, about 18 kilometres (11 mi) east of Gori, Georgia. Putina claimed that Putin's father was a Russian mechanic, Platon Privalov, who got Vera pregnant while he was married to another woman. She claimed Putin was two years older than his registered birth date as he was held back in school. A "Vladimir Putin" was registered at Metekhi school in 1959–1960. Records show that his stated nationality is Georgian. Putina married a Georgian soldier, Giorgi Osepahvili. Her husband pressured her to abandon her son. In December 1960, she delivered "Vova" back to his grandparents in Russia. Putina believed that the St. Petersburg-based "parents" referred to in Putin's official biography adopted her son from his grandparents.

Through her contacts, she learned that Putin had become a KGB officer. In 1999, she spotted Putin on television. Putina said that Russian and Georgian people visited her village to pressure her to remain silent. A school teacher, who says she taught Putin, stated that she too had been threatened. Putina said she was ready to do DNA tests. Russian journalist Artyom Borovik's plane crash coincided with the documentary he was making about Putin's childhood, including a report about Vera Putina. Italian journalist Antonio Russo was reportedly also interested in Vera Putina before he was murdered.

Putina died in Tbilisi, Georgia, in May 2023, at the age of 96. She was buried in Metekhi on 30 May.
