= Zhanna Volkova =

Former wife of Kirill Shamalov

Zhanna Volkova is a Romanian-Ukrainian entrepreneur, socialite, and former wife of wealthy Russian businessman Kirill Shamalov, who is the former son-in-law of Vladimir Putin. She lives in London following her separation from Shamalov in 2021.

Volkova married Shamalov in 2018, after he split with Putin's daughter Katerina Tikhonova.

In 2021, Shamalov and Volkova separated, and Volkova left Russia to live with her sister in London. Volkova said she was concerned about not being allowed to see the child that she had with Shamalov via a surrogate. Shamalov filed a lawsuit to have the marriage annulled, which a court dismissed. Shamalov and Volkova had a prenuptial agreement that entitled her to a significant amount of money in the case of a divorce. Volkova appointed Christen Ager-Hanssen and the law firm Harbottle & Lewis to represent her in divorce proceedings against Shamalov in England, but the representation agreement ended in disputes by 2024.

In February 2023, Volkova was added to Russia's most wanted list of fugitives after a warrant was issued for her arrest on defamation charges. She denied involvement in any crimes.
