= Puin =

Puin may refer to:

- Gerd R. Puin, German scholar and world's foremost authority on Qur'anic paleography
- Puin (brand), a Russian brand of canned food
