= Roman Putin =

Russian businessman and politician (born 1977)

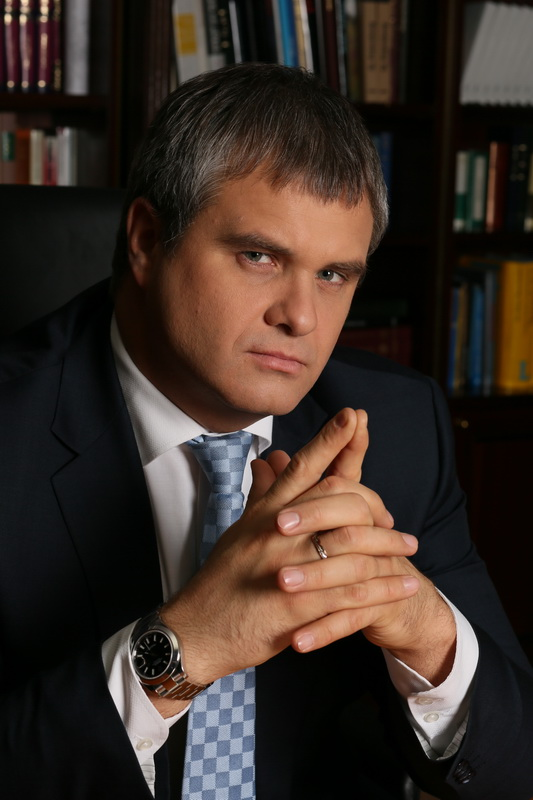
- Putin in 2013
- Born: 10 November 1977 (age 48); Ryazan, Russian SFSR, Soviet Union
- Citizenship: Russian
- Occupation: Businessman (finance)
- Political party: Russia without corruption (Россия без коррупции)
- Father: Igor Putin
- Relatives: Vladimir Putin (first cousin once removed); Maria Vorontsova (second cousin)

Roman Igorevich Putin (Russian: Роман Игоревич Путин; born 10 November 1977) is a Russian politician and businessman. He is the son of businessman Igor Putin who is a first cousin of Russian President Vladimir Putin.

== Early life and education ==
Roman Putin's grandfather, Alexander, was the uncle of the President of Russia, Vladimir Putin. Putin was born in Ryazan, Russia, in 1977. He is the son of Igor Putin, a former director of the Master Bank.

== Career ==
In 2012–2013 he was a non-paid adviser to the governor of Novosibirsk Oblast on social and economic issues. In particular, he proposed and supervised an ambitious project to convert a leading truck repair factory into an assembly plant. He was relieved from his duties when the project failed to materialize, which he attributed to a personal vendetta from the governor. Putin remains an adviser on similar matters to the governor of Yamalo-Nenets Autonomous Okrug.

Roman Putin is the chairman of Group MRT and co-owner of three other Russian companies: Gazstroiholding, Modernizatsiya Rechnogo Transporta (Modernization of River Transport), and Frantsuzskie Aviatsionnye Technologii (French Aviation Technologies). The second company organizes passenger services on the Moscow River aiming to reduce traffic congestion, while the third one produces autogyros.

Since 2013, Putin has been an independent private investment advisor, providing consultancy for investment projects in Russia. In March 2014, Putin founded his own consulting company named Putin Consulting Ltd., that helps foreign investors realize their investment projects in Russia.

== Politics ==
Putin announced the creation of the pro-presidential party "People of Business" in 2020. However, by 21 June, he had joined the existing Russia without corruption party and was elected its leader on 5 July in a secret ballot.
