= Antonio Russo =

Italian journalist (1960–2000)

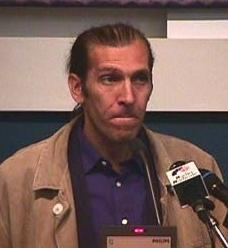
- Born: 3 June 1960; Francavilla al Mare, Italy
- Died: 16 October 2000 (aged 40); Tbilisi, Georgia
- Occupations: Reporter, Radical Radio
- Mother: Beatrice Russo

Antonio Russo (3 June 1960 – 16 October 2000) was an Italian journalist and Vice-President of the International Press Free lance (FLIP), who was murdered while covering the Second Chechen War.

== Career ==
Born in 1961 in Chieti, (Abruzzo), Russo was taken from an orphanage when he was about 6 years old. In the eighties, he left the Faculty of Veterinary Medicine of Pisa in order to study at the Faculty of Philosophy at Sapienza University of Rome in 1986. The same year, he founded, with a group of students, the magazine Philosophema, which he devoted much of his intellectual commitment.

After studying philosophy, he started doing journalism in the nineties, his first service being a report from Siberia (with Radical Radio). He reported from Algeria during the years of bloody repression, Burundi and Rwanda during the Hutu-Tutsi war. He documented the Second Congo War, and then Ukraine, Colombia, Russia, Algeria and Sarajevo during the siege.

Russo was also sent to Kosovo, where he was the only Western journalist in the region during the NATO bombing. He documented the ethnic cleansing against Albanians Kosovars.

On that occasion, he was also the protagonist of a daring escape from the Serbian forces, joining a convoy of refugees from Kosovo with a direct train to Macedonia. The convoy stopped along the way and Antonio Russo reached Skopje on foot. There was no news of him for two days, and he was thought to have been lost. On his return, he received two major journalism awards.

Russians denied him entry to Chechnya, so Russo went to Georgia to cover crimes against civilians there. He sent movies and correspondences to Radical Radio.

Russo also intended to interview Vera Putina, a woman who claimed Vladimir Putin was her lost son.

Russo was also investigating the Russian request for the United Nations to expel the Radical Party, accused of meddling in the war in Chechnya. Russo planned to return to Rome by October 16 with the information he had gathered.

== Death ==
Antonio Russo died in the night between 15 and 16 October 2000 in Georgia, where he was sent by Radical Radio to document the crimes in Chechnya. The Farnesina announced that his body was found on the edge of a country road, near the village of Udzharma, 25km from Tbilisi (the same road leads to the Vaziani Military Base, where Russian forces were stationed at the time). The body was bruised and showed signs of torture, with techniques related to special military services. The autopsy revealed that Russo was killed by blows to the chest that caused fatal internal injuries. The Commissioner Nugzar Khambashidze was in charge of the investigation.

Russo's apartment had been searched and looted; his laptop computer, mobile telephone, video camera, and three videotapes were missing. Russo's friends believed that the FSB was responsible for his death due to his discovery of unconventional weapons being used against children. According to his mother, Beatrice, Russo told her in a phone call before his death that he came into possession of a videotape documenting war crimes in Chechnya.

== Recognition ==
Two films have been devoted to his work in Chechnya. In May 2009, Daniel Biacchessi wrote the story of Antonio Russo in his book Passione reporter.

== Awards ==
1999, 10 October (Mantua) - "Prize Andrea Barbato] Ethics of objectivity" III° Edition

1999, 28 May (Sarteano) - VII° Journalist Award Sarteano "Clean Pens".

1999 - XX° [Ischia International Journalism Prize

2001, April 11 - XXVI ° Journalism Prize Saint-Vincent organized by the friends of the house of game of Saint-Vincent with the High Patronage of the President of the Republic.

2006, September 11 - Prize Witness for Peace

2012, October 15 (Rome) - Prize Italy Human Rights "Global and Human Civilization"

== Film ==
2003- was released in cinemas L'inquilino di via Nikoladze by the director Massimo Guglielmi (UNESCO Prize 2005).

2004- was released in cinemas Chechnya, a film about the history of the war reporter, by Leonardo Giuliano with Gianmarco Tognazzi in the role of Antonio Russo distributed by Stazione Marittima Spa and supported by the Ministry of Heritage and Culture (Ministry of Culture)

== See also ==
- Anna Politkovskaya
