= Spiridon Putin =

Russian chef, paternal grandfather to Vladimir Putin (1879–1965)

- Спиридон Путин
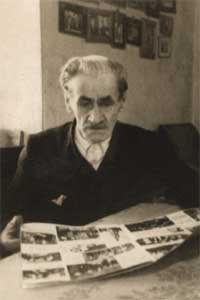
- Born: Spiridon Ivanovich Matiyasic Putin; 19 December 1879; Tver Governorate, Russian Empire
- Died: 19 December 1965 (aged 86); Moscow, Russian SFSR, Soviet Union
- Occupation: Chef
- Known for: A chef for Vladimir Lenin, Nadezhda Krupskaya, and Joseph Stalin
- Children: 4
- Relatives: Vladimir Putin (grandson); Igor Putin (grandson); Maria Putina (great-granddaughter); Katerina Tikhonova (great-granddaughter)

Spiridon Ivanovich Putin (Russian: Спиридон Иванович Путин; 19 December 1879 – 19 December 1965) was a Russian chef, who worked as the personal chef of Vladimir Lenin and also cooked for Joseph Stalin. He was the paternal grandfather of Vladimir Putin, the current president of Russia.

== Early life and education ==
Spiridon Ivanovich Putin was born to Russians Ivan Petrovich Putin (1845–1918) and Paraskeva Matveevna Putina (née Golubeva; 1844–1906) in Tver Governorate, Russian Empire. At 12 years old he worked with his cousin at an inn in Tver, and at 15 years old he moved to Saint Petersburg to study cooking.

== Career ==
Putin worked at the Hotel Astoria in Saint Petersburg, where he once served Grigori Rasputin. Rasputin gave Putin a gold ruble as he was impressed with the cuisine and noticed the similarity between their names.

After the 1917 Russian Revolution, Putin fled to his ancestral home in Tver Governorate. He later returned to Petrograd, after which he moved to Moscow. In Moscow he became Vladimir Lenin's chef. After Lenin's death in 1924, Putin cooked for Lenin's widow, Nadezhda Krupskaya and her sister until their deaths years later. During this time he also cooked occasionally for Joseph Stalin. Putin most likely served in the employ of the NKVD, the secret police predecessor of the KGB. After Krupskaya's death in 1939, he worked as chef in a Moscow Communist Party boarding house at Ilyinsky, Moscow Oblast.

Putin continued working as a chef until shortly before his death in Moscow on his 86th birthday in 1965.

== Personal life ==
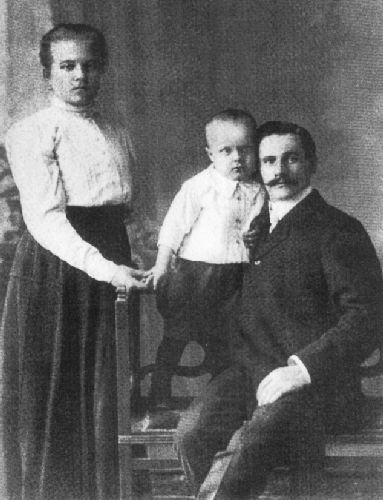
Spiridon Ivanovich and Olga Ivanovna Putin with their son Nikolai, 1910

Of his four sons, two (Mikhail and Alexey) died in World War II, another, Vladimir Spiridonovich, father of Vladimir Putin, was crippled in combat, and one son, Alexandr, came back from war unscathed.
