= Putina =

Putina may refer to:

- Putina (town), town in Peru
- Putina District, of the San Antonio de Putina Province in Peru
- Putina, a village in Vlădeşti Commune, Argeș County, Romania
- Putina or Wawa Putina, a stratovolcano in Peru
- Huaynaputina, a stratovolcano in Peru
- Feminine form of Putin (surname)
- P. T. Narasimhachar (1905–1998), a Kannada Indian poet commonly known as "Pu Ti Na" or "Putina"
- Putina River (Bahlui), Romania
- Putina River (Râușor), Romania
