= Igor Zelensky =

Russian ballet dancer (born 1969)

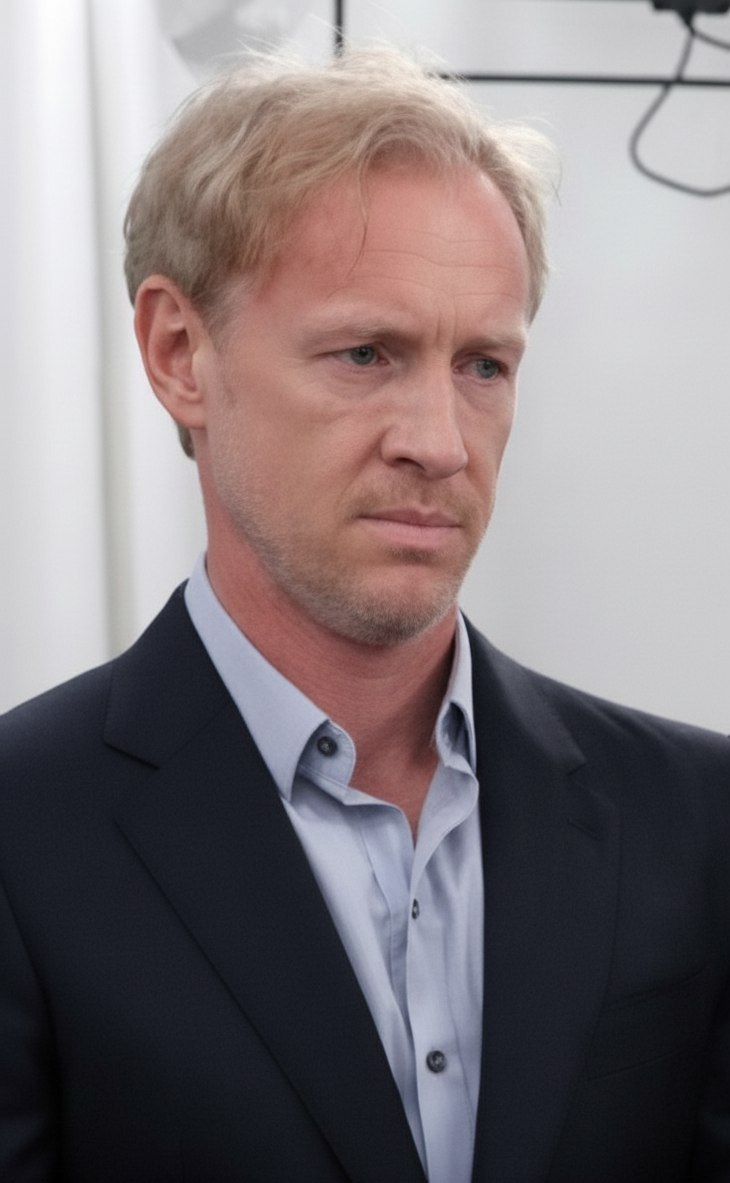
- Zelensky in 2018
- Born: 13 July 1969 (age 57); Labinsk, Russian SFSR, Soviet Union
- Occupation: Ballet dancer
- Partner: Katerina Tikhonova
- Children: 1

Igor Anatolyevich Zelensky (Note: Also romanized as Zelenskiy) (Russian: Игорь Анатольевич Зеленский; born 13 July 1969) is a Russian ballet dancer.

== Early life ==
Zelensky was born on 13 July 1969, in Labinsk, Krasnodar Krai, Russian SFSR. He was a principal at the Mariinsky Ballet from 1991 until 2013. He graduated from the Tbilisi School of Ballet (class of Vakhtang Chabukiani) and trained at the Vaganova academy (class of Gennady Selutsky).

== Career ==
Zelensky was a principal for five years at the New York City Ballet. His roles include Romeo in Romeo and Juliet and Siegfried in Swan Lake. He has performed around the world, including with the Royal Ballet in London, at La Scala in Milan, at the Bayerische Staatsoper in Munich and with the New York City Ballet.

Zelensky served as the Artistic Director of the Novosibirsk Opera and Ballet Theatre (2006–2015) as well as the Stanislavski and Nemirovich-Danchenko Moscow Academic Music Theatre (2011–2016). From 2016 to 2022, he was the Ballet Director of the Bayerisches Staatsballett; he resigned on 4 April 2022 due to "private family reasons" after failing to denounce the 2022 Russian invasion of Ukraine, and was summoned by the German Science and Arts Ministry to explain his links to a cultural heritage foundation tied with the Russian state. Serge Dorny, the general director of Bavarian State Opera, had inadvertently told Russian pranksters Vovan and Lexus that Zelensky "didn't make that decision on his own", and said, "We had a conversation, and I brought him to this conclusion."

== Personal life ==
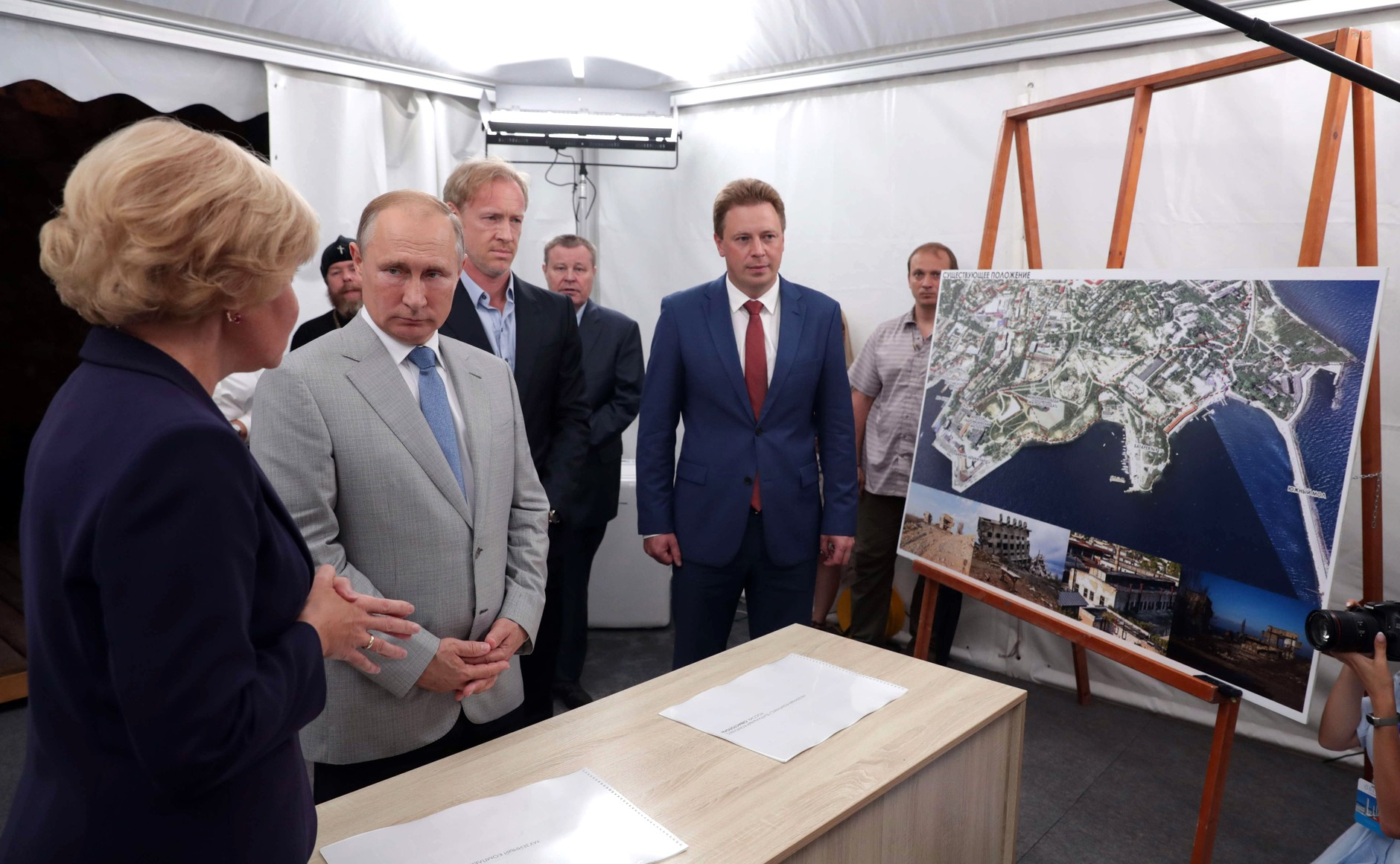
Igor Zelensky (3rd from left) with Vladimir Putin in Sevastopol, 2018

Zelensky is reportedly the partner of Katerina Tikhonova, the second daughter of Russian president Vladimir Putin. They reportedly have two children, including a daughter, born 2017, and a son,Adrian, born 2025.

== See also ==
- List of Russian ballet dancers
