= Kirill Shamalov =

Russian businessman, the ex-son-in-law of Vladimir Putin

- Born: Kirill Nikolayevich Shamalov; 22 March 1982 (age 44)
- Citizenship: Russian
- Education: Saint Petersburg State University Faculty of Law
- Occupation: Businessman
- Spouses: Katerina Tikhonova (m. 2013; div. 2018); Zhanna Volkova (m. 2018; sep. 2021)
- Children: 1
- Father: Nikolai Shamalov

Kirill Nikolayevich Shamalov (Russian: Кирилл Николаевич Шамалов; born 22 March 1982) is a Russian businessman, the ex-husband of Katerina Tikhonova (Note: Katerina is Vladimir Putin's second daughter.) and the ex-son-in-law of the Russian president Vladimir Putin. He was the former economic advisor to the Russian government.

He is the younger son of Nikolai Shamalov, a co-owner of Rossiya Bank and a close Putin confidant.

After marrying Putin's daughter in 2013, Shamalov was offered numerous lucrative and preferential business deals worth billions of dollars. He became Russia's youngest billionaire at the age of 32. Shamalov is a director and part-owner of Sibur, a Russian petrochemicals company. Shamalov's 21% stake in the company is reportedly worth $2 billion. The price for the stake and the circumstances behind the acquisition of the stake are unclear. Immediately after marrying Putin's daughter, he obtained a 3.8% stake (valued at $388 million) in the company for $100.

In 2018, the United States sanctioned him. After the 2022 Russian invasion of Ukraine, Shamalov was sanctioned by the United Kingdom.

== Early life and education ==
Shamalov is the younger son of Nikolai Shamalov.

Shamalov was educated at Saint Petersburg State University, where he obtained a degree in law.

== Career ==
After graduating at the age of 25, Shamalov was given an executive position at Gazprom-Media, Russia's largest media holding company.

Shamalov became an industry leader in 2012 when the owners of Sibur promoted him from Vice President of Business Administration to Deputy CEO. Shamalov owned a 0.5% stake in the company, while in June 2013 his offshore company Kylsyth Investments Limited based in Belize acquired a 3.8% stake in the company for only US$100. In August 2014, his Russian company Yauza 12, with the help of a loan from Gazprombank, purchased an additional 17% of Sibur from Gennady Timchenko, owner of Sibur, for roughly $2.2 billion.

According to the OCCRP, Shamalov owned a vast network of offshore companies by 2013.

In April 2017, Bloomberg reported that Shamalov sold his shares of Sibur that he purchased from Timchenko to Leonid Mikhelson, the other owner of Sibur.

== Sanctions ==
In April 2018, the United States imposed sanctions on him and 23 other Russian nationals. Since his February 2013 marriage to Vladimir Putin's daughter Katerina and joining the elite billionaires group close to Vladimir Putin, Shamalov had become a major shareholder in Sibur in less than 18 months and a year later had received a billion dollar loan from Gazprombank, which was under United States sanctions (EO 13662), and had purchased a 17% stake in Sibur from Gennady Timchenko, who was under United States sanctions (EO 13661).

Shamalov was also sanctioned by the British government on 24 February 2022, for his role at PAO SIBUR Holding, which was judged to have aided in the invasion of Ukraine.

== Personal life ==
In February 2013, Shamalov married Katerina Tikhonova, Putin's second daughter, at Igora, a small ski resort near Sosnovo in the Leningrad Oblast. In January 2018, Shamalov and Tikhonova separated. He allegedly lost 50% of his wealth due to this separation.

Later in 2018, Shamalov reportedly married Zhanna Volkova (Russian: Жанна Волкова). They have a daughter. The couple separated in mid-2021 and are in the midst of divorce proceedings. Shamalov filed a lawsuit to dismiss their marriage as invalid.

Shamalov owns millions of dollars' worth of real estate in Russia and France. On 14 March 2022, two Russian activists were arrested for breaking into and occupying Shamalov's villa in Biarritz, France; the activists had announced they intended to use the property to house Ukrainian refugees from the Russian invasion of Ukraine.
