= Ochyorsky District =

Ochyorsky District Очёрский район (Russian)
- District
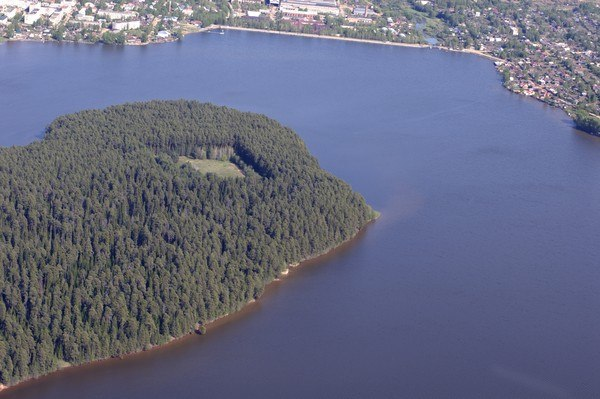
- Ocher Pond, in Ochyorsky District

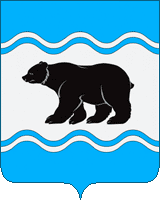
- Flag Coat of arms
- Location of Ochyorsky District in Perm Krai
- Coordinates: 57.899°N 54.598°E
- Country: Russia
- Federal subject: Perm Krai
- Established: January 1924 (first), January 25, 1935 (second)
- Administrative center: Ochyor

Area
  - Total: 1,330 km^{2} (510 sq mi)

Population (2010 Census)
  - Total: 22,828
  - Density: 17.2/km^{2} (44.5/sq mi)
  - Urban: 76.3%
  - Rural: 23.7%

Administrative structure
  - Inhabited localities: 1 cities/towns, 1 urban-type settlements, 74 rural localities

Municipal structure
  - Municipally incorporated as: Ochyorsky Municipal District
  - Municipal divisions: 2 urban settlements, 3 rural settlements
- Time zone: UTC+5 (MSK+2)
- OKTMO ID: 57644000
- Website: http://ocher.permarea.ru

Ochyorsky District (Russian: Очёрский райо́н) is an administrative district (raion) of Perm Krai, Russia; one of the thirty-three in the krai. Municipally, it is incorporated as Ochyorsky Municipal District. It is located in the southwest of the krai. The area of the district is 1,330 square kilometers (510 sq mi). Its administrative center is the town of Ochyor. Population: 22,828 (2010 census); 25,347 (2002 census); 27,013 (1989 Soviet census). The population of Ochyor accounts for 62.4% of the district's total population.

== Geography ==
About 48% of the district's territory is covered by forests.

== History ==
The district was established in January 1924, but was abolished between January 1, 1932 and January 25, 1935.

== Demographics ==
Ethnic composition (as of the 2002 Census):

- Russians: 95%
- Udmurt people: 1.2%

== Economy ==
The economy of the district is based on agriculture and engineering.

== Sources ==
- Законодательное собрание Пермской области. Закон №416-67 от 28 февраля 1996 г. «Об административно-территориальном устройстве Пермского края», в ред. Закона №504-ПК от 9 июля 2015 г. «О внесении изменений в Закон Пермской области "Об административно-территориальном устройстве Пермского края"». Вступил в силу с момента опубликования. Опубликован: "Звезда", №38, 12 марта 1996 г. (Legislative Assembly of Perm Oblast. Law #416-67 of February 28, 1996 On the Administrative-Territorial Structure of Perm Krai, as amended by the Law #504-PK of July 9, 2015 On Amending the Law of Perm Oblast "On the Administrative-Territorial Structure of Perm Krai". Effective as of the moment of publication.).
- Законодательное собрание Пермской области. Закон №1729-352 от 10 ноября 2004 г. «Об утверждении границ и о наделении статусом муниципальных образований Очёрского района Пермского края», в ред. Закона №175-ПК от 7 марта 2013 г. «О внесении изменений в отдельные Законы Пермской области, Коми-Пермяцкого автономного округа об утверждении границ и о наделении статусом муниципальных образований Пермского края». Вступил в силу через десять дней со дня официального опубликования. Опубликован: "Бюллетень Законодательного Собрания и администрации Пермской области", №12, I часть, 9 декабря 2004 г. (Legislative Assembly of Perm Oblast. Law #1729-352 of November 10, 2004 On Establishing the Borders and on Granting the Status to the Municipal Formations of Ochyorsky District of Perm Krai, as amended by the Law #175-PK of March 7, 2013 On Amending Various Laws of Perm Oblast, Komi-Permyak Autonomous Okrug on Establishing the Borders and on Granting the Status to the Municipal Formations of Perm Krai. Effective as of the day which is ten days following the day of the official publication.).
