= Metekhi, Shida Kartli =

Metekhi მეტეხი
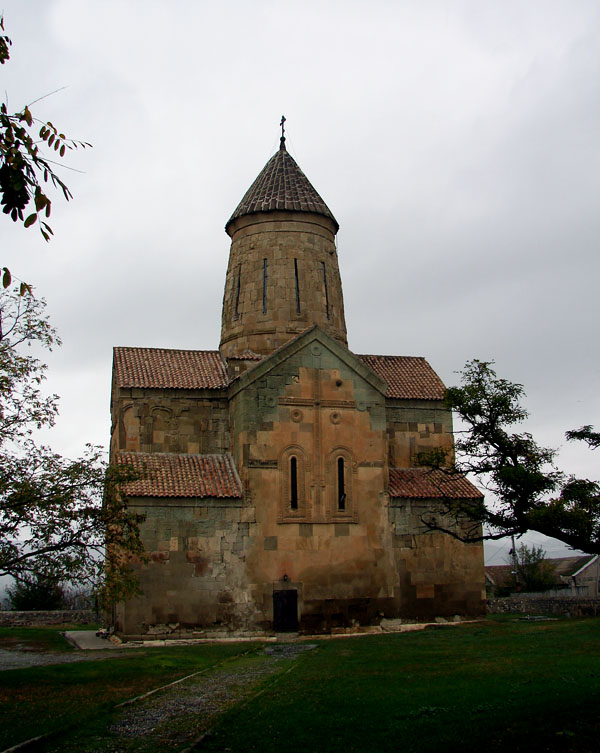

- Location in Georgia
- Coordinates: 41°55′24″N 44°20′13″E
- Country: Georgia
- Region: Shida Kartli
- Municipality: Kaspi
- Elevation: 560 m (1,840 ft)

Population (2014)
  - Total: 2,105
- Time zone: UTC+4 (Georgian Time)

Metekhi (Georgian: მეტეხი) is a village in Georgia, in Kaspi Municipality. It is located on the right bank of the Kura. It is the center of a Theme (Villages: Metekhi, Barnabiantkari, Metekhi Station).

== Demography ==
| Year | Population | Men | Women |
|---|---|---|---|
| 2002 | 3,089 | 1,493 | 1,596 |
| 2014 | 2,105 | 1,025 | 1,080 |

== See also ==
- Shida Kartli
