= Master Bank =

Private Banking Company Of Russia

- Industry: Banking, financial services
- Founded: 1992
- Headquarters: Moscow, Russia

Master Bank (Russian: Мастер-банк, Russian pronunciation: [məsʲtʲɪr bank]; JSB) was a private bank in Moscow. As of 2012, it was the 69th largest bank in Russia. In November 2013, its bank license was withdrawn by Central Bank of Russia.

== Activity ==
Master Bank provided corporate lending, lending to small and medium business, loans to physicals, servicing corporate clients, trade and project finance, international operations, issue and service of plastic cards, retail business, deposits, the operations in the financial markets etc.

== History ==
The bank was founded in 1992. In 2010, it was assigned a credit rating A "High level of creditworthiness" (rating agency "Expert RA") and he took 2nd place in the rating "The most reliable of the 100 largest Russian banks" magazine "Profile". In November 2013, Master Bank's banking license was revoked by the Central Bank of Russia.

It was a universal bank providing all types of banking services. It had 12 branches with more than 100 offices in 10 regions of Russia. The central office of Master-Bank was located in Moscow (Runovsky lane, 12).
