= Puin (brand) =

Vegetable and mushroom canned good brand

A can of PuTin, the cabbage miracle with mushrooms of the PuTin brand

Puin (Russian: Пуин) also spelled PuTin (Russian: ПуТин) is a brand of vegetable and mushrooms canned goods produced by Astrakhan Canned-food Plant (Astarkhanskiy Konservniy Kombinat) and its parent company Russian Canned-food Plant (Russkiy Konservniy Kombinat). The official name of the brand is Puin but the logo is crossed by the T-shaped sword (a KGB symbol) making the impression that the brand is PuTin, similar to the name of Russian President Vladimir Putin. The logo is put on the background of a Double-headed eagle very similar but not identical to the Coat of arms of Russia. The official logo was developed in 2007 to compete with Ukrainian brand Veres that had then approximately 70% share of all the canned food sold in Russian supermarkets. According to the owners of the trademark the logo increased their sales in a short time by 25%.
