= Igor Putin =

Russian politician

- Игорь Путин
- Born: Igor Alexandrovich Putin; 30 March 1953 (age 73); Leningrad, Russian SFSR, Soviet Union (now Saint Petersburg, Russia)
- Education: Ryazan Military Higher School
- Occupations: Businessman and politician
- Known for: Former vice president of Master Bank
- Children: Roman Putin
- Father: Alexander Putin
- Relatives: Vladimir Putin (first cousin)

Igor Alexandrovich Putin (Russian: Игорь Александрович Путин, IPA: [ˈiɡərʲ ɐlʲɪkˈsandrəvʲɪtɕ ˈputʲɪn]; born 30 March 1953) is a Russian businessman and politician, former vice president of Master Bank. He is a first cousin of the Russian president, Vladimir Putin. He is the chairman of Igor Putin Fund, an investment company supporting and developing the industry in outlying regions of Russia.

== Early life and education ==
Igor Putin was born in Leningrad to the family of a Soviet military officer Alexander Putin, a younger brother of Vladimir Putin senior, father of the Russian president. Soon the family moved to Kovrov and then to Ryazan, where Alexander Putin served as an instructor in Ryazan Guards Higher Airborne Command School.

Igor Putin graduated from Ryazan Guards Higher Airborne Command School in 1974.

== Career ==
In 1974–1998, Igor Putin served in the Soviet Army and then in Russian Army. In 1998, he retired from the military and moved to Ryazan. In 1998–2000, he worked in Ryazan Oblast Statistics Committee. In 2000–2005, he worked as the chairman of the Ryazan Licensing Chamber. In 2002, he became the chairman of Ryazan Coordination Committee of the United Russia party. During those years Igor Putin also obtained degrees from the Volgo-Vyatskaya Academy of State Service (2000) and from Moscow Institute of Economics, Management, and Law (2003)

In 2005, Igor Putin moved to Samara to become the chairman of the Samara Reservoir Plant (part of VolgaBurMash holding). In October 2006, Igor Putin changed his political affiliations from the United Russia to A Just Russia political party, but his political uplifting was halted by his cousin who did not want to develop nepotism within the government. In 2007, he became a director of AvtoVAZbank.

In September 2010, Igor Putin became Vice President of Master Bank. In the same month, the bank received a lucrative contract with Russian Nanotechnology Corporation. Still, Igor Putin held the vice president position only a few months and retired in December 2010.

In February 2012, he invested in the development of the Murmansk port. At that time, he also owned 51% of Energiya, 40% of Avangard 500, and 25% of Gorizont TV. As of 2013, as Board Chairman of Pechenga International Sea Port, he was a member the Government Marine Board.

=== Sanctions ===
He was sanctioned by the UK government in 2022 in relation to the Russo-Ukrainian War.

== Money laundering ==
His retirement coincided with a criminal investigation in which over 30 million Russian roubles was allegedly stolen from the bank by its employees using IT technologies. The investigation accused a leading IT specialist of the bank, Mery Tevanyan of operating a large illegal business with the daily volume up to 500 million Russian roubles using bank's money. In March 2011, five days after conclusion of the investigations Igor Putin returned to the bank as a director. According to the bank he is not supposed to manage its daily operations. Igor Putin also keeps his position as a director of the AvtoVAZbank.

In November 2013, the Central Bank of Russia revoked the banking licence of Master Bank following money-laundering scandals. Igor Putin was director of the Board of the bank at the time of the scandal, and had previously served as Vice-President.

In 2014, a report by the Organized Crime and Corruption Reporting Project (OCCRP) exposed a $20-billion money-laundering scheme between Russian banks and the Moldovan bank Moldindconbank, scheme where the Russian Land Bank wired $5 billion to the Moldovan bank. Igor Putin was a director of Land Bank, and declared to Forbes Russia that he quit this position when he grew uncomfortable about the suspicious activities of the bank. Other banks associated with Igor Putin were involved in a massive money laundering scheme dubbed the Russian Laundromat. The system moved money through Putin's and other banks using fake loans between offshore, paper companies, bribed Moldovan judges and Moldovan and Latvian banks to move money out of Russia and into Europe. The UK company Lantana Trade LLP, owned by Igor Putin, was the company that triggered the attention of the whistleblower Howard Wilkinson who broke the story after he noticed Lantana Trade was filed dormant in the UK while millions of dollars were going in and out of the company's bank account in Estonia. The OCCRP originally exposed that the operation involved $230 billion transferred through Danske Bank. The Russky Zemelny Bank, in which Igor Putin was an investor, shut down that same year for suspicious activities related to a 20-billion money-laundering affair. Igor Putin resigned from the Board of Directors of the Russkiy Zemelny Bank, Promyshlenny Sberegatelny Bank and the construction company Yakut.

In 2017, the banker Alexei Kulikov was arrested for illegally pumping $10 billion out of the country through Promersbank, a bank that held Igor Putin on its board at the time of this arrest.

== Family ==
His son is Roman Putin, a businessman who set up the Russian firm Putin Consulting in March 2014, and launched the Russian Railways corruption scandal the following month. He has a niece, Vera Putina, sometimes erroneously referred to as the niece of President Putin.
