= Ochyor =

Town in Perm Krai, Russia

Ochyor Очёр
- Town
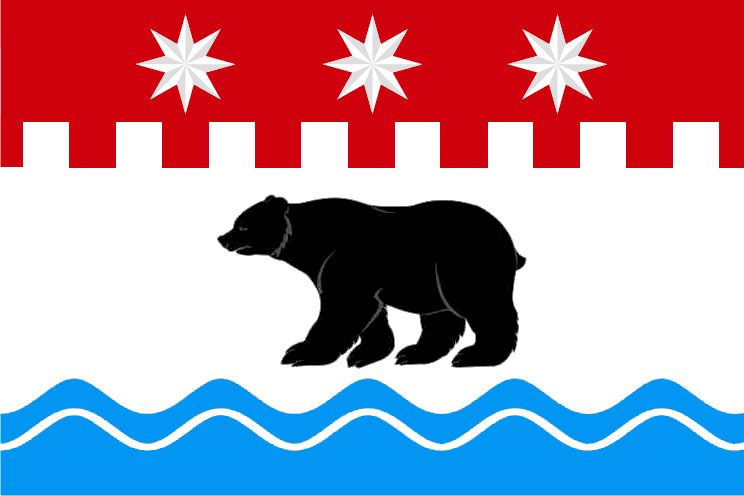
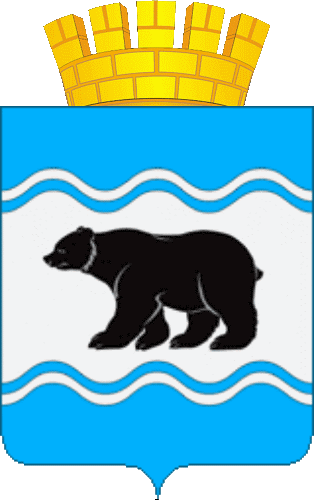
- Flag Coat of arms
- Interactive map of Ochyor
- Location of Ochyor Ochyor (Perm Krai)
- Coordinates: 57°53′N 54°44′E
- Country: Russia
- Federal subject: Perm Krai
- Administrative district: Ochyorsky District
- Founded: 1759
- Town status since: 1950

Government
  - Head: Leonid Mokrushin
- Elevation: 150 m (490 ft)

Population (2010 Census)
  - Total: 14,238
  - Estimate (2023): 14,294 (+0.4%)

Administrative status
  - Capital of: Ochyorsky District

Municipal status
  - Municipal district: Ochyorsky Municipal District
  - Urban settlement: Ochyorskoye Urban Settlement
  - Capital of: Ochyorsky Municipal District, Ochyorskoye Urban Settlement
- Time zone: UTC+5 (MSK+2)
- Postal codes: 617140, 617141
- Dialing code: +7 34278
- OKTMO ID: 57644101001
- Website: ocher.permarea.ru/ocher

Ochyor (Russian: Очёр), alternatively spelled Ocher, is a town and the administrative center of Ochyorsky District in Perm Krai, Russia, located on the Ochyor River (Kama's tributary), 120 kilometers (75 mi) west of Perm, the administrative center of the krai. Population: 14,238 (2010 census); 15,563 (2002 census); 16,352 (1989 Soviet census).

== History ==
The settlement was founded in 1759 in connection with the construction of the Ocher iron foundry and ironworks, owned by Count Stroganov. In 1918, on the site of the old factory, the Ocher Machine-Building Plant was established, which produces bulldozers, pipe-layers, depth-pumping rods, etc. The city industry is represented by a casting-mechanical plant, a food processing plant, a bakery and a dairy plant. In Ocher suburbs there are concentrated deposits of gravel, peat, there are outlets of soda waters.

In 1924 Ocher district was formed. On February 25, 1929, Ocher was granted a status of the settlement, on June 19, 1950 - status of the city.

== Administrative and municipal status ==
Within the framework of administrative divisions, Ochyor serves as the administrative center of Ochyorsky District, to which it is directly subordinated. As a municipal division, the town of Ochyor is incorporated within Ochyorsky Municipal District as Ochyorskoye Urban Settlement.

== Paleontology ==
Near Ochyor, a number of important discoveries of Permian fossil reptiles (especially Therapsids) have been made, beginning in 1952.
