= Jorrit Faassen =

Dutch businessman, alleged son-in-law of Vladimir Putin

- Born: Jorrit Joost Faassen; 24 February 1980 (age 46); Leiderdorp, Netherlands
- Spouse: Maria Vorontsova (m. 2008, divorced)
- Children: 1

Jorrit Joost Faassen (born 24 February 1980) is a Dutch businessman. He was allegedly the husband of Maria Vorontsova and the son-in-law of Russian president Vladimir Putin.

== Biography ==
Faassen was born in Leiderdorp in the Netherlands, the elder of two sons born to Jozef Faassen and Felicitas van de Stadt. His father was a naval officer in Willemstad, Curaçao until 1986, a colonel in the 1990s and then a head of department in the Royal Netherlands Navy. Faassen is a nephew of the Dutch painter Casper Faassen.

He studied architectural engineering at The Hague University of Applied Sciences and graduated in 2004.

In 2005, Faassen met Maria Vorontsova at a costume party at De twee heeren ("Two gentlemen") in Maastricht.

On 15 April 2006, he moved to Moscow where he had been a director at Stroytransgaz but left that post to take a top posting in 2007 at Gazprombank, where he no longer works. He was the deputy chairman of MEF Audit, a Russian consulting group, until mid 2015 when MEF Audit removed his name from their website.

Faassen married Maria Vorontsova, the eldest daughter of Russian president Vladimir Putin, in summer 2008 in Wassenaar in the Netherlands.

On 14 November 2010, along the Rublevskoye Highway (Russian: Рублёвское шоссе) near Moscow, Faassen was beaten by four bodyguards of the Russian banker Matvey Urin, the co-owner of Trado-Bank (Russian: АКБ «Традо-Банка» (ЗАО)), previously the head of Breeze Bank (Russian: «Бриз-Банк») and associated with four other Moscow banks, all six of which subsequently went bankrupt. Half an hour after this occurred, Urin was detained and later incarcerated at Butyrka and subsequently lost his wealth and vast holdings. Urin received an 8.5 year sentence and was released in September 2018. After the beating, Faassen allegedly stated that he never wanted to set foot in such a gangster country again and both he and Masha took a vacation to New Zealand. (Note: Allegedly, Putin’s daughters do not have driver's licenses according to traffic police. The audit and consulting group MEF-Audit of which Faassen was an employee owned the cars in which they were driven around Moscow and the power of attorney for the vehicles was issued to Evgeniy Burdeiny (Russian: Евгений Бурдейный) who is an employee of the Russian Presidential Security Service (SBP) of the FSO.)

Faassen and Vorontsova have a daughter, born in August 2012 in the Netherlands. In 2013, they were living in a penthouse atop the highest residential building in Voorschoten; they lived in the Crimea district (Dutch: De Krim) of Voorschoten with neighbors fearing for their safety following what had happened with Matvey Urin. In 2014, Dutch residents called for Vorontsova to be expelled from the country after Malaysia Airlines Flight 17 was shot down in Ukraine. In 2015, they were reported to be living in Moscow.

In 2022, it was reported that Faassen and Vorontsova are no longer married. (Note: Allegedly, in 2022, Maria Faassen was married to Yevgeny Nagorny and had taken the name Maria Nagornaya.)
