= Svetlana Krivonogikh =

Russian millionaire (born 1975)

- Светлана Кривоногих
- Born: Svetlana Alexandrovna Krivonogikh; 10 March 1975 (age 51); Leningrad, Soviet Union
- Occupation: Real estate investor
- Children: 1

Svetlana Alexandrovna Krivonogikh (Russian: Светлана Александровна Кривоногих; born 10 March 1975) is a Russian real estate investor and millionaire alleged to have had an affair and a child out of wedlock with President Vladimir Putin.

== Biography ==
Krivonogikh was born in Leningrad, Russian SFSR (now Saint Petersburg, Russia), on 10 March 1975.

She attended Saint Petersburg State University of Economics and Finance in the Department of International Economic Relations, receiving her diploma in 2000.

Krivonogikh's name became known with a 2020 Proekt investigation, which documented her connection to Putin as well as her financial assets and properties in Russia. Her name became more widely known in connection with the Pandora Papers published by ICIJ in October 2021, which revealed her assets overseas. The Proekt report estimated the value of Krivonogikh's business assets and properties in Moscow and St. Petersburg to US$102 million.

Krivonogikh has a daughter, Elizaveta (also known as Luiza Rozova), born on 3 March 2003. The investigation by Proekt published in November 2020 alleged that Elizaveta's father is Russian president Vladimir Putin. Krivonogikh's relationship with Putin allegedly began in the 1990s when she was working as a cleaner and living in a communal apartment before moving to housing known for St. Petersburg elites.

== Sanctions ==
In February 2023, due to the 2022 Russian invasion of Ukraine, Krivonogikh was sanctioned by the United Kingdom over her being a shareholder in the National Media Group which "consistently promotes the Russian assault in Ukraine".
