= Maria Vorontsova =

Daughter of Vladimir Putin (born 1985)

- Мария Воронцова
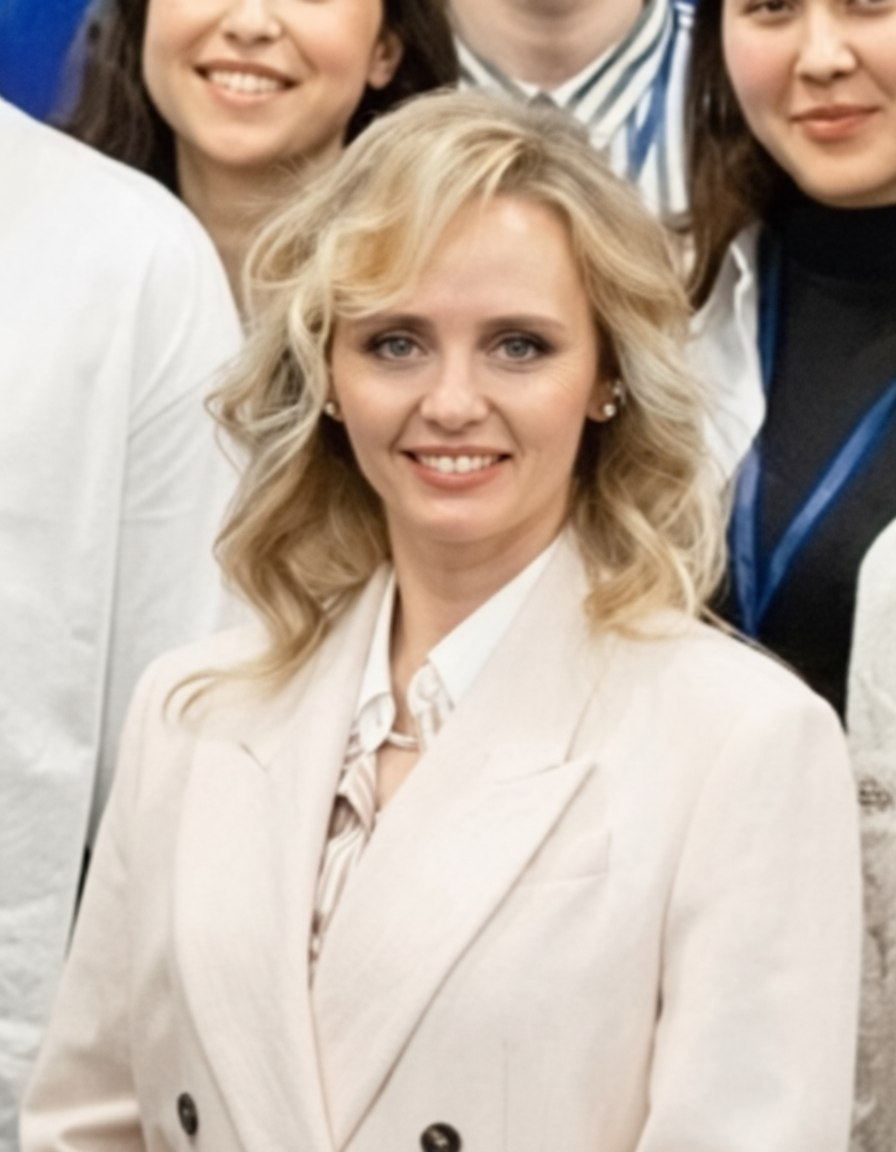
- Vorontsova in 2024
- Born: Mariya Vladimirovna Putina; 28 April 1985 (age 41); Leningrad, Russian SFSR, Soviet Union
- Other names: Maria Faassen; Maria Nagornaya
- Education: Saint Petersburg State University; Moscow State University
- Occupation: Endocrinologist
- Spouses: Jorrit Faassen (m. 2008; div. 2015); Yevgeny Nagorny (m. 2016)
- Children: 2
- Parents: Vladimir Putin (father); Lyudmila Putina (mother)
- Relatives: Katerina Tikhonova (sister)

Maria Vladimirovna Vorontsova (Russian: Мария Владимировна Воронцова, née Putina, Путина; born 28 April 1985), also referred to as Maria Faassen, is a Russian pediatric endocrinologist. She is the elder child of Russian president Vladimir Putin.

== Early life ==
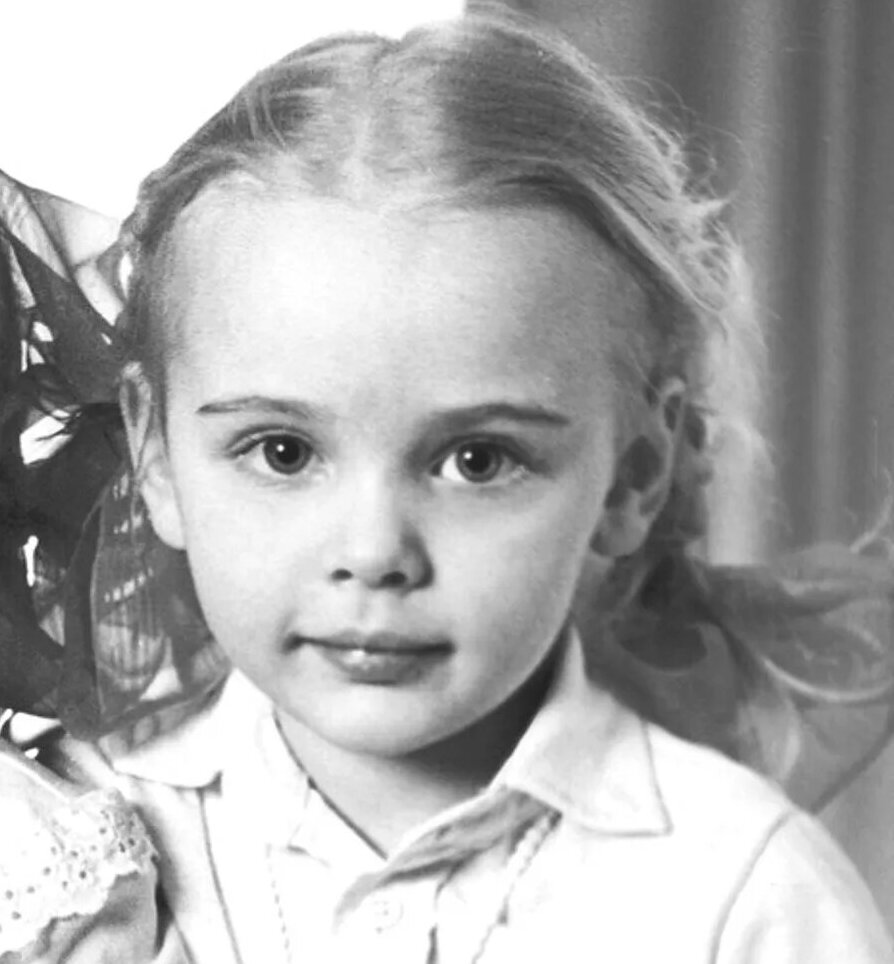
Maria Vorontsova as a child, 1988

Vorontsova was born in Leningrad (now Saint Petersburg), the elder daughter of Vladimir Putin and Lyudmila Putina (née Shkrebneva). She attended German school at Dresden, East Germany, while her family lived there in the late 1980s. After her family returned to Leningrad in the spring of 1991, she attended Peterschule (Russian: Петершуле), a German gymnasium in Saint Petersburg. Later, during violent gang wars involving the Tambov Gang while it was taking control of Saint Petersburg's energy trade, she and her sister Katerina were sent by their father, who feared for their safety, to Germany where their legal guardian was former Stasi officer Matthias Warnig, who had worked with their father in Dresden as part of a KGB cell and established the Dresdner Bank branch in Saint Petersburg.

She played the violin for a Russian consulate general of Hamburg–sponsored diplomatic breakfast in 1995. Later, after her family moved to Moscow, she attended the German School Moscow, a school closely associated with the German Embassy in Moscow for children of diplomats. She graduated after 11 years of school. Three years later, she began her university studies, enrolling together with Katerina as first year students.

== Education and career ==
Vorontsova studied biology at Saint Petersburg State University and is a graduate of medicine at Moscow State University in 2011. With Ivan Ivanovich Dedov (Russian: Иван Иванович Дедов) as her advisor, she was a PhD candidate at the Endocrinology Research Centre in Moscow, headed by Dedov and which runs the charity project Alfa-Endo, for children with endocrine diseases. Alfa-Endo is funded by Petr Aven and Mikhail Fridman's Alfa-Bank of the Alfa Group.

Between 2013 and 2015, Vorontsova co-authored five studies including "The status of blood antioxidant system in patients with active acromegaly". She also, in 2015, co-authored a book about idiopathic stunting in children. Vorontsova is credited to be Putin's advisor in genetic engineering, especially in the usage of CRISPR to create genetically engineered babies.

In November 2023, Vorontsova was appointed to the board of the Moscow Society of Medical Genetics (Russian: Московское общество медицинских генетиков). According to Russian opposition leader Aleksei Navalny's team, she's earning millions of dollars per year as an employee of the New Medical Company (NOMEKO).

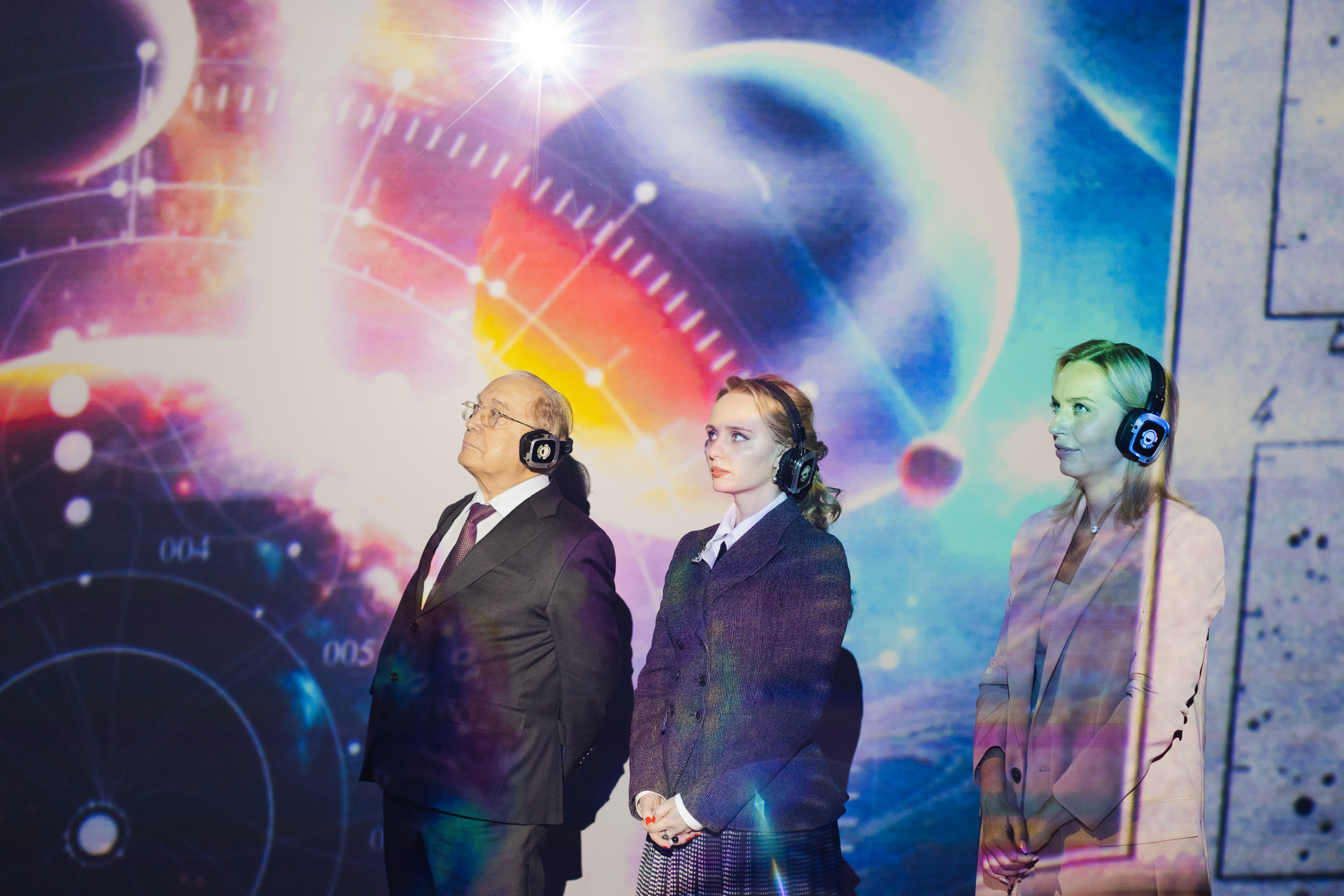
Vorontsova (in center) with Rector of Moscow State University Viktor Sadovnichiy at the opening of the "edutainment-exhibition generated by a neural network", 2023

== Sanctions ==
On 6 April 2022, following the Russian invasion of Ukraine, the United States Department of the Treasury sanctioned Vorontsova, stating that she "leads state-funded programs that have received billions of dollars from the Kremlin toward genetics research and are personally overseen by Putin." She is also sanctioned by the European Union, the United Kingdom, Japan and New Zealand.

== Personal life ==
Vorontsova married Dutch businessman Jorrit Faassen in summer 2008 in Wassenaar in the Netherlands. They have a son, born August 2012. In 2013, they were living in a penthouse atop the highest residential building in Voorschoten. In 2014, Dutch residents called for Vorontsova to be expelled from the country after Malaysia Airlines Flight 17 was shot down by pro-Russian rebels in Ukraine. In 2015, Vorontsova and Faassen were reported to be living in Moscow. In 2022, it was reported that they are no longer married.

Vorontsova is married to Yevgeny Nagorny, who works at the Russian oil and gas company Novatek. They have a son, born April 2017.
