= Chekhov, Moscow Oblast =

Town in Moscow Oblast, Russia

Chekhov Чехов
- Town
- Lopasnia-Zachatievskoje manor Church of St. John the Baptist

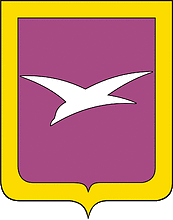
- Flag Coat of arms
- Interactive map of Chekhov
- Location of Chekhov Chekhov (Europe) Chekhov (Russia)
- Coordinates: 55°09′N 37°27′E
- Country: Russia
- Federal subject: Moscow Oblast
- Administrative district: Chekhovsky District
- TownSelsoviet: Chekhov
- Town status since: 1954

Government
  - Body: Council of Deputies
- Elevation: 170 m (560 ft)

Population (2010 Census)
  - Total: 60,720
  - Estimate (2025): 86,786 (+42.9%)
  - Rank: 269th in 2010

Administrative status
  - Capital of: Chekhovsky District, Town of Chekhov

Municipal status
  - Municipal district: Chekhovsky Municipal District
  - Urban settlement: Chekhov Urban Settlement
  - Capital of: Chekhovsky Municipal District, Chekhov Urban Settlement
- Time zone: UTC+3 (MSK)
- Postal codes: 142300–142308, 142316
- Dialing code: +7 49672
- OKTMO ID: 46584000001
- Town Day: One of the days in September

Chekhov (Russian: Че́хов) is a town and the administrative center of Chekhovsky District in Moscow Oblast, Russia. Population: 60,720 (2010 census); 72,917 (2002 census); 59,206 (1989 Soviet census); 56,000 (1985).

It was previously known as Lopasnya (until 1954).

== Geography ==
The city of Chekhov is located south of the capital, 50 kilometers from the Moscow Ring Road along the highway. The city is connected to Moscow by the Kursk direction of the Moscow Railway, the Simferopol highway, and the Crimea highway nearby. Chekhov railway station is located on the 75th kilometer of the railway (0 kilometer — Kursky railway station). Most of the city is located on the left bank of the Lopasni River and west of the railway line. The city stretches from north to south for 5 km. The area of the city is 23 km2.

The climate is temperate continental with moderately cold winters and warm, humid summers. The frequent passage of cyclones from the Atlantic and sometimes from the Mediterranean causes an increase in clouds. The average January temperature is about -9 °C, the average July temperature is about +18 °C. The average frost—free period is about 200 days. The soils are predominantly alluvial, grey and woody.

== History ==
In ancient times, the Oka and its tributaries Nara, Protva, Lopasnya and other rivers that have survived to the present day appeared on the Priok plain as a result of the melting of a powerful glacier that descended from the north. These lands were inhabited by the first people of the Neolithic era, who left stone tools, axes, knives, spears. From the 8th century BC to the 6th century AD, settlements of patriarchal tribal communities developed here, which already knew fire and even created primitive clay products. In the second half of the 10th century, Vyatichi began to settle along the banks of the Oka River. The remains of these ancient Slavic villages were found in different places of the Lopasny region at the confluence of the Terebenki River with Lopasnya, near the village of Solnyshkov, in Spas-Temna, Stary Spas, Talezh.

In 1175, after bloody battles for the right of ownership of the Vladimir-Suzdal lands, the victory went to the brothers Mikhail and Vsevolod Bolshoe Gnezdo. During military campaigns and battles, their wives took refuge under the protection of Grand Duke Svyatoslav of Chernigov. "... And then Svyatoslav, the ambassador of their wives, Mikhalkova and Vsevolozha, having assigned his son Oleg to them, I will escort them to Moscow. Oleg returned to his parish of Lopasna...". So for the first time the name of the city appears in the chronicle.

And in the future, the story of Lopasni is a story of endless wars, destruction, and captivity. In 1246, after the death of Prince Mikhail of Chernigov in the Horde, his Chernigov principality split into appanages, and Lopasnya became part of the newly formed Tarussian Principality.

At the beginning of the 14th century, Lopasna was sold by the Tarussian princes to Metropolitan Peter. The "collector of Russian lands" Ivan Kalita appreciated the city of Lopasnya and wrote it off in his spiritual testament to his son Andrey. Then Lopasna was exchanged by Moscow from the Serpukhov princes in order to give it to Ryazan in exchange for the "Ryazan places" along the Protva River. In 1371, Moscow captured Lopasna, and in the 1380s it was forced to return it to Ryazan.

In 1572, the Battle of Molodinsk took place north of modern Chekhov near the village of Molodi, which ended in a major victory over the numerically superior forces of the Crimean Khan Devlet Giray. The Battle of Molodinsk ended Russia's three-year struggle against the Turkish-Crimean invasion.

=== Lopasnya and Pushkin ===
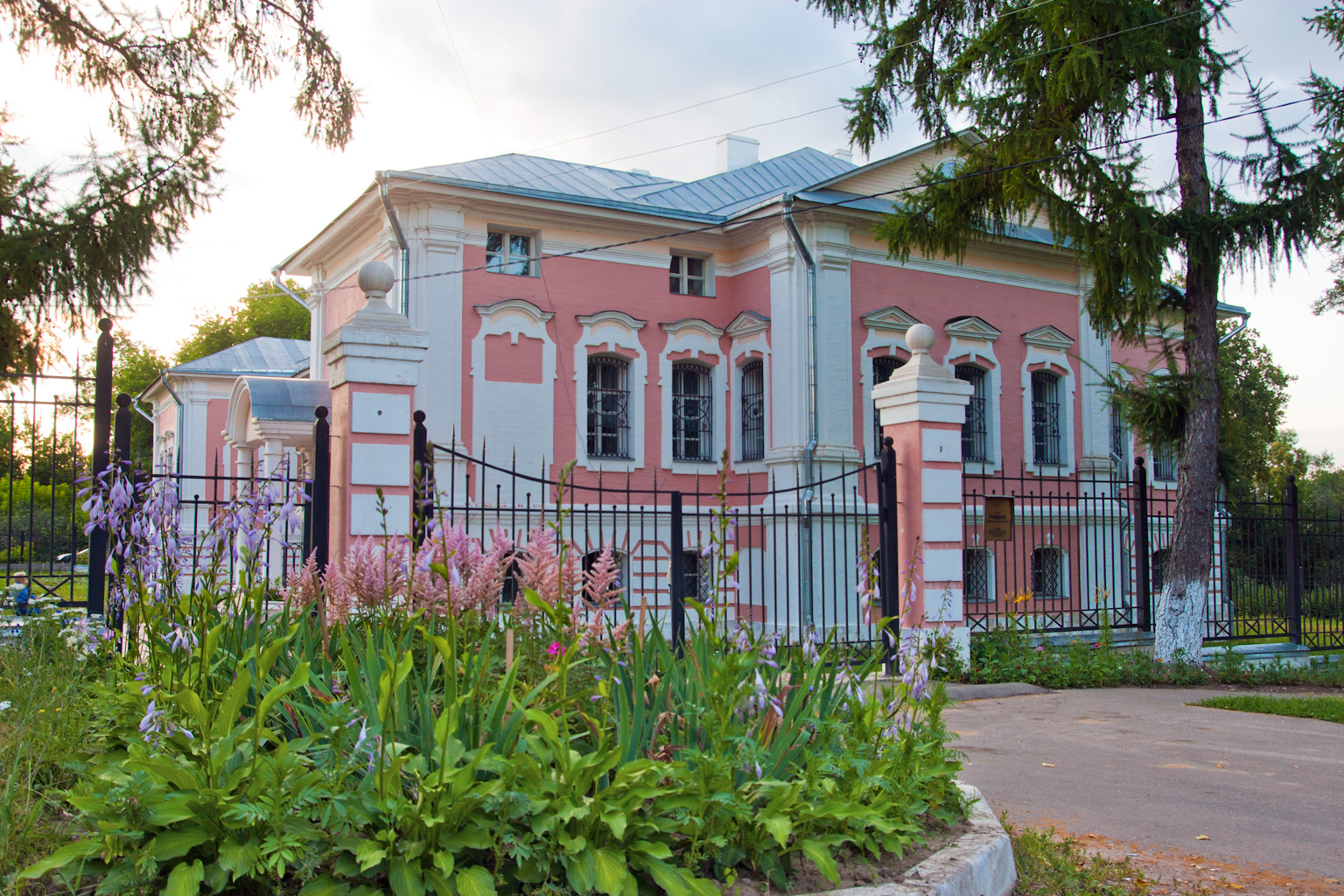
Goncharov-Vasilchikov Manor (since 2007, a museum)

A special place in the history of Lopasnya is occupied by everything connected with the name of Pushkin, after whose death his wife Natalia Nikolaevna often visited the Vasilchikov estate "Lopasnya-Zachatievskoye" with her children. Her family lived in this estate at the beginning of the 20th century; some of the poet's descendants were buried (or reburied) there. In 1917, a manuscript of the History of Peter was discovered in the manor house.

Natalia Nikolaevna's second husband, Peter Lansky, was a close relative of Vasilchikov. Three of Lansky's sisters lived in Lopasna: Maria (she was married to General Nikolai Ivanovich Vasilchikov), Elizabeth and Natalia. Sofia Alexandrovna Pushkina grew up with the Vasilchikov children. After her death in 1875, the nine Pushkin children were also raised in the Vasilchikov household. Alexander Alexandrovich, the eldest son of Alexander Sergeyevich Pushkin, a participant in the Russian-Turkish War of 1877-1878, also lived in Lopasna for a long time. Alexander Pushkin's eldest daughter Maria Alexandrovna was also very fond of visiting Lopasna.

Next to the Church of the Conception of St. Anna is the Pushkin family necropolis. Alexander Sergeevich's descendants rest in it: his eldest son A. A. Pushkin, the grandchildren of G. A. and S. A. Pushkin, the great-granddaughter of the poet through the female line of S. P. Vorontsov-Velyaminov.

=== Modern name ===
In 1954, the village of Lopasnya was transformed into a city of regional subordination of the Czechs. It was named after Anton Chekhov, a Russian writer of the 19th and 20th centuries. (the Melikhovo estate, where Chekhov lived and worked, is located near the city).

In 1965, the working village of Venyukovo was incorporated into Chekhov. In 1994-2004, Chekhov was also the center of the Chepelevsky rural district.

== Chekhov urban settlement ==
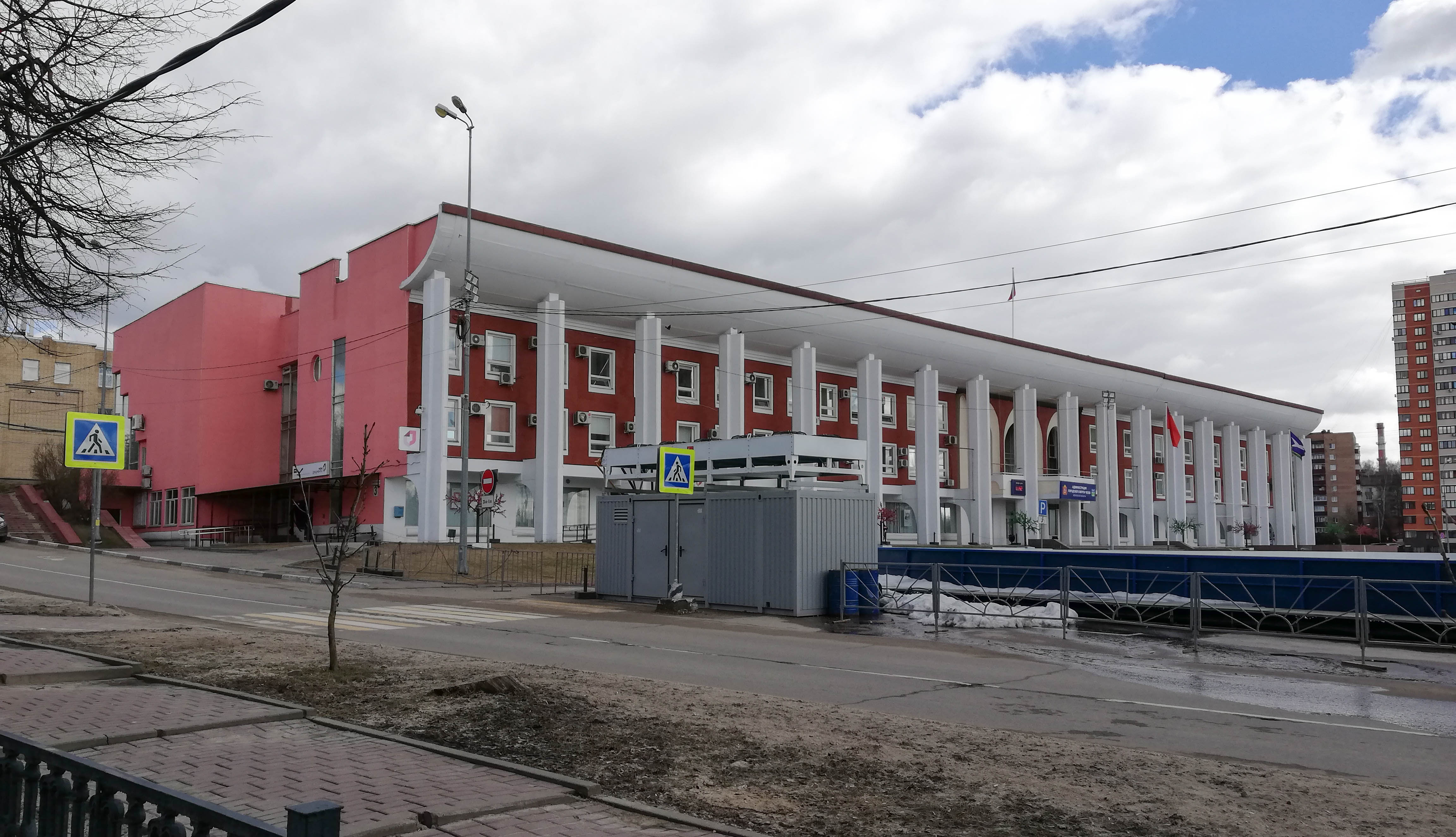
The building of the district administration in Chekhov

During the implementation of the Federal Law "On the General Principles of the Organization of Local Self-Government in the Russian Federation", municipalities were established in the Moscow Region. In 2005, the law of the Moscow Region "On the Status and Borders of the Chekhov Municipal District and the newly Formed Municipalities within it" was adopted. In particular, the municipal formation "urban settlement of Chekhov" was formed, which included 1 settlement — the city of Chekhov.

=== Geographical data ===
The area of the urban settlement is 2984 hectares.

The municipality is located in the central part of the Chekhov municipal district, and borders:

with the rural settlement of Stremilovskoye (in the south, west and north),

with the rural settlement of Barantsevskoye (in the east).

=== Government agencies ===
The structure of local self-government bodies in a municipality consists of:

- Council of Deputies of the city of Chekhov
- The head of the city of Chekhov

The Council of Deputies is a representative body of local self—government. It consists of 20 deputies elected by citizens on the basis of universal, equal and direct suffrage by secret ballot for a period of 5 years. The chairman of the Council of Deputies is the Head of the city of Chekhov.

The mayor of Chekhov is elected by the citizens of the urban settlement in direct elections for a period of 5 years. The mayor heads the Council of Deputies of the city of Chekhov.

The head of Chekhov is Grigory Igorevich Artamonov.

== Economy ==
Chekhov district pays great attention to attracting investors to various sectors of the economy. One of the largest projects is the completion of the construction of the third stage of the FM logistics complex, which employs about 900 people; JSC Electroshield, expansion of the production activities of Danone Industria LLC, etc. In total, more than 1,500 new jobs have been opened.

In 2007, two new industrial enterprises were put into operation. These are the factory for the production of thermal insulation boards made of extruded polystyrene foam by CJSC Dau Chemical and the factory for the production of chocolate mass by the Swiss company Barry Callebout.

Several more investment projects are under implementation. New industrial facilities make a significant contribution to the district's budget, and new jobs are being created.

Preference in working with investors is given to environmentally friendly, high-tech industries.

The largest industrial enterprises in the city include:

Chekhov-Avto Group of Companies (the largest car seller in the region, sells cars and spare parts for them) (the company actually ceased to exist more than 15 years ago. The Karusel hypermarket was opened in the former Chekhov Auto building, which also ceased to exist in December 2024)

Metallotorg CJSC (metal warehouse in the Chekhov district, a branch of the largest metal rolling company in the European part of Russia)

OOO "CSI-I" Vostok (plastic caps for carbonated drinks and beer)

Danone-Industria LLC (dairy and fermented milk products)

Polyalt LLC (production of cellular polycarbonate)

Shattdekor LLC (manufacturer of decorative paper for the furniture industry)

Tut Tile LLC (production, laying and sale of paving slabs)

PNK-Group LLC (one of the largest warehouse terminals in the Russian Federation)

TSB Plus LLC (electricity in Chekhov)

Logopark YUG LLC (logistics warehouse complex, including warehouses of Lenta, Adidas, Abrau-Durso, Foreman, etc.)

PJSC Institute of Engineering Immunology (medical and veterinary drugs)

PJSC "Korma" (compound feed for cows, pigs, birds)

PJSC KVZ (Kryukovsky Fan Plant) (fans for general industrial and special purposes, traction machines)

PJSC "Lyubuchansky Plastics Plant" (production of plastic products)

PJSC "Magic Photo and Creative"

External Images

Candy bars produced in Soviet times

Chekhov Confectionery Factory PJSC (Chekhov Confectioner, confectionery production)

Chekhov Gidrostal Plant PJSC (metal structures for construction purposes, crane hydromechanical equipment)

Chekhov Printing Plant PJSC (publishing and printing activities, replication of recorded media) (at the moment, it has actually ceased to exist. The building complex belongs to the First Model Printing House. Most of the premises are rented out. The Chekhov Printing Yard enterprise was created on the basis of the CHPK, which constantly changes owners.)

PJSC "CRZ" (recycling and restoration of worn-out tires, regenerate, crushed rubber) (most of the territory is leased)

CJSC Energomash (Chekhov) — CHZEM (production of high-pressure pipe fittings and spare parts for it) (actually ceased to exist. The entire territory is rented out for go-karts, tennis, exhibitions, etc.)

In Chekhov, there are the largest retail chains of well-known companies such as LENTA, OKEY DA!, Auchan, Dixie, Perekrestok, Karusel, Pyaterochka, Tornado, Magnit, M.Video, Korablik, Sportmaster, Computer store Pilot, OZON online store, All tools.<url> networks of mobile phone shops Svyaznoy, MTS, Megafon, Beeline.

There are also branches of the largest banks in Russia.: VTB, Sberbank, Credit Bank of Moscow, Alfa Bank.

=== Transport ===
- Chekhov railway station on the Moscow—Tula line (Kursk direction of the Moscow Railway), as well as on the Dedovsk— Chekhov, Tsaritsyno — Serpukhov, and Volokolamsk—Chekhov lines. The nearest station to which you can quickly transfer is the Tsaritsyno Zamoskvoretskaya line. The rolling stock is EP2D from the depots of Pererva and Nakhabino, as well as modified EP2D "REX".
- Intercity bus routes 1365 (Chekhov — Moscow, Lesoparkovaya metro station), 61 (Chekhov — Podolsk), 428k (Chekhov — Lesoparkovaya metro station, stops at Novy Byt and Popovo) also depart from the bus station. Bus 1365 also stops near the metro station Annino Serpukhovsko-Timiryazevskaya line, and the metro station Lesoparkovaya Butovskaya line allows you to get to the Kaluzhsko-Rizhskaya metro line.
- 34 suburban bus routes from the bus station (located near the railway station
- 8 inner-city bus routes (Nos. 1k, 3, 4, 5k, 6k, 7k, 8, 10k). Recently, the city has started purchasing new buses that connect to busy routes. Chinese buses and LiAZ Voyage arrive on route 1365. There are also many NefAZ, LiAZ, and PAZ buses in the city (running on urban private routes 1k, 5k, 10k, 24k and district minibuses).
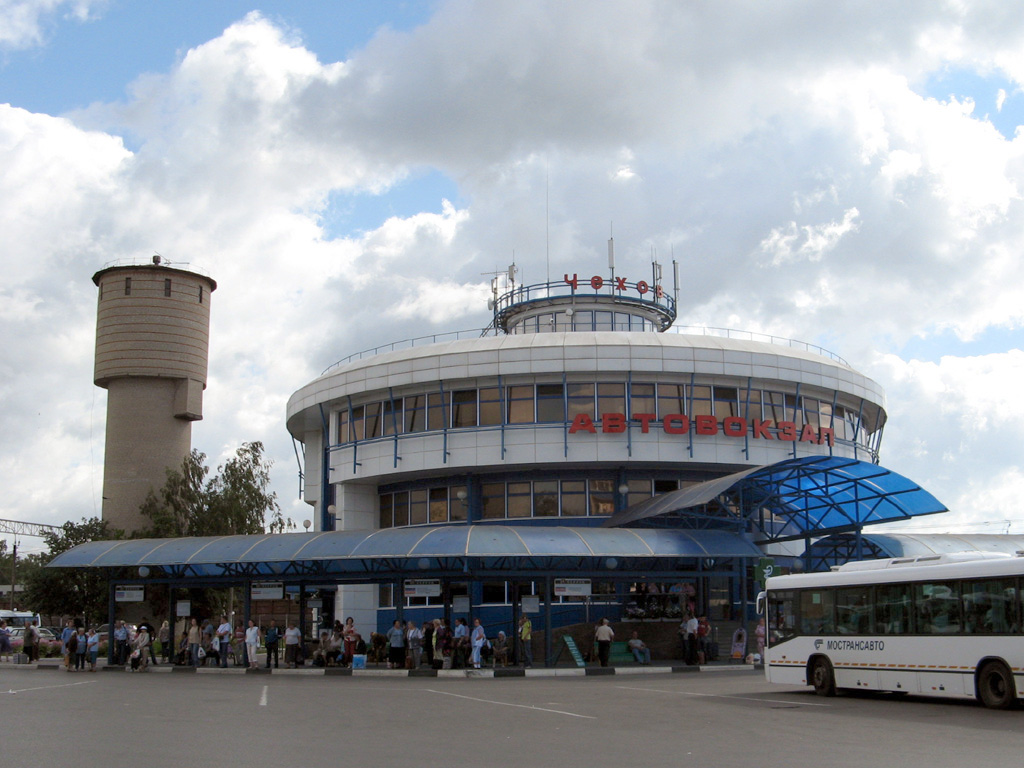
Chekhov Bus Station

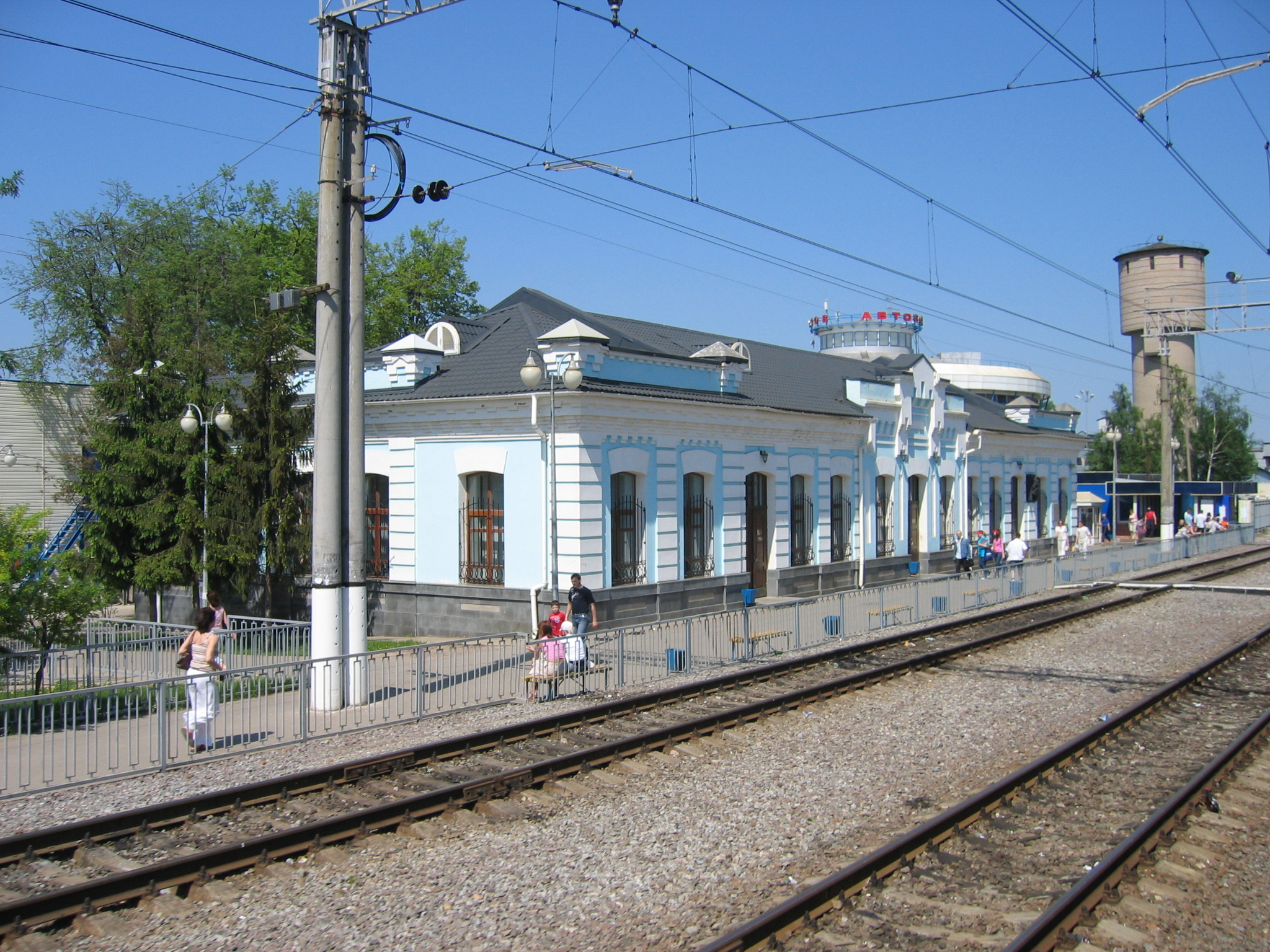
Chekhov Railway Station

== Strategic importance ==
Near the city there is a highly protected complex of facilities of the General Staff of the Armed Forces of the Russian Federation, designed to accommodate the command headquarters in the event of a large-scale war.

== Education ==
- Chekhov Branch of Moscow University of Finance and Law (MFUA)

== Construction ==
In 2011, the Carnival shopping and entertainment center on Moskovskaya Street was put into operation. On four floors of the complex there are: a grocery supermarket, a supermarket of electronics and household appliances, a clothing department store, a multiplex cinema and a children's entertainment complex, a food court.

== Social environment ==
Due to the active construction and subsequent population growth, the situation of providing social services to the population has become more complicated — there are not enough places in kindergartens, hospitals and polyclinics are overcrowded with visitors. There is a pronounced disparity between the size of the population and the number of jobs in the city, which is why morning and evening traffic jams at the exits from the city and waves of passenger traffic on the railway are very noticeable. In the last few years, there has been a large number of drug addicts and alcoholics in the city.

== Healthcare ==
Since 2000, the district's healthcare structure has included municipal healthcare institutions.:

Health Department of the Chekhov Municipal District Administration; Chekhov Regional Hospital No. 1 (with a capacity of 333 day and 24-hour beds); Chekhov Regional Hospital No. 2 (with a capacity of 230 beds, with outpatient departments with a capacity of 445 visits per shift); Central District Polyclinic (with a capacity of 1,075 visits per shift); Lubuchanskaya District Hospital (with a bed capacity of 40 beds and outpatient departments for 175 visits per shift); MUZ "Ambulance station" (designed for 25 thousand visits per year).

== Sports ==
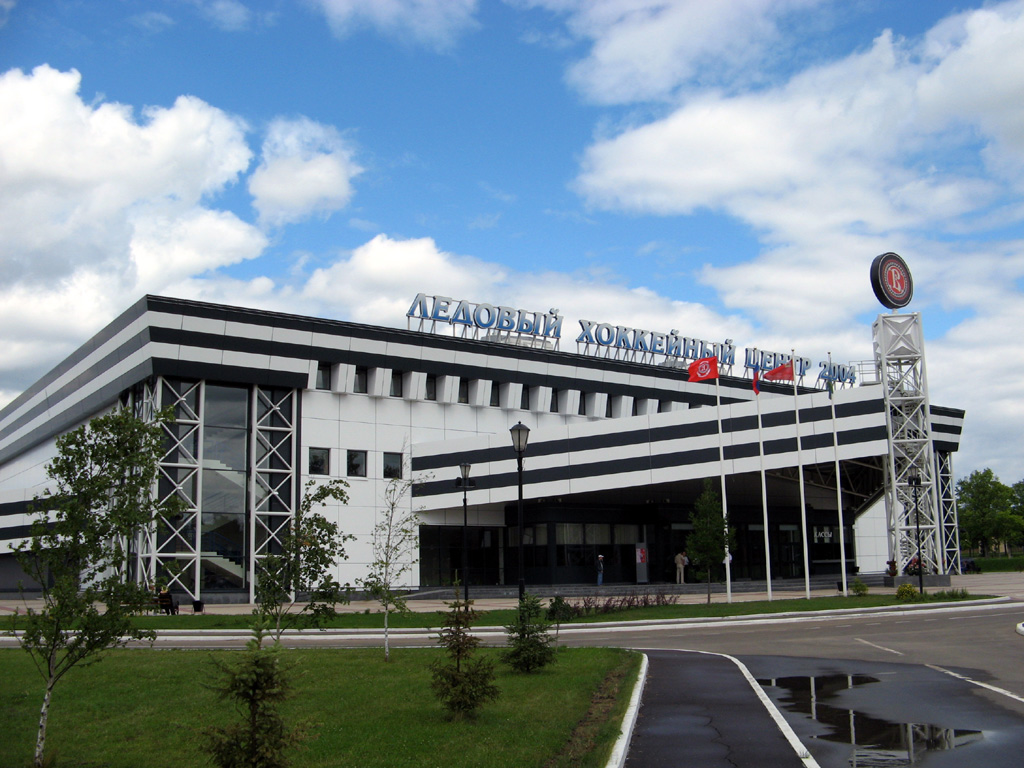
The ice hockey center.

In Chekhov district, much attention is paid to the development of physical culture and sports. The real forge of sports personnel are children's sports schools, the development and support of which is given great attention. Young hockey players play in 5 teams, and football players play in four teams. Young handball players compete in five teams and take prizes in all age groups. In 2007, a team of boys born in 1995 won an international tournament in Belarus. The team of young water polo players became winners of international tournaments in Montenegro, Italy, and Spain. In 2004, the Ice Hockey Center 2004 was built, and the Vityaz hockey club, which previously belonged to Podolsk, moved to Chekhov and was based in the city until the start of the 2013/14 season. From the beginning of the 2013/14 season to the beginning of the 2022/23 season, he performed in Podolsk again. From the beginning of the 2022/23 season until the termination of the existence of the Vityaz hockey club, he played in Balashikha.

In December 2001, a new handball club, Chekhov Bears, was established on the basis of the CSKA SportAkadem club, which won the Russian Championship 21 times in a row (2002-2022) under the leadership of Vladimir Maksimov.

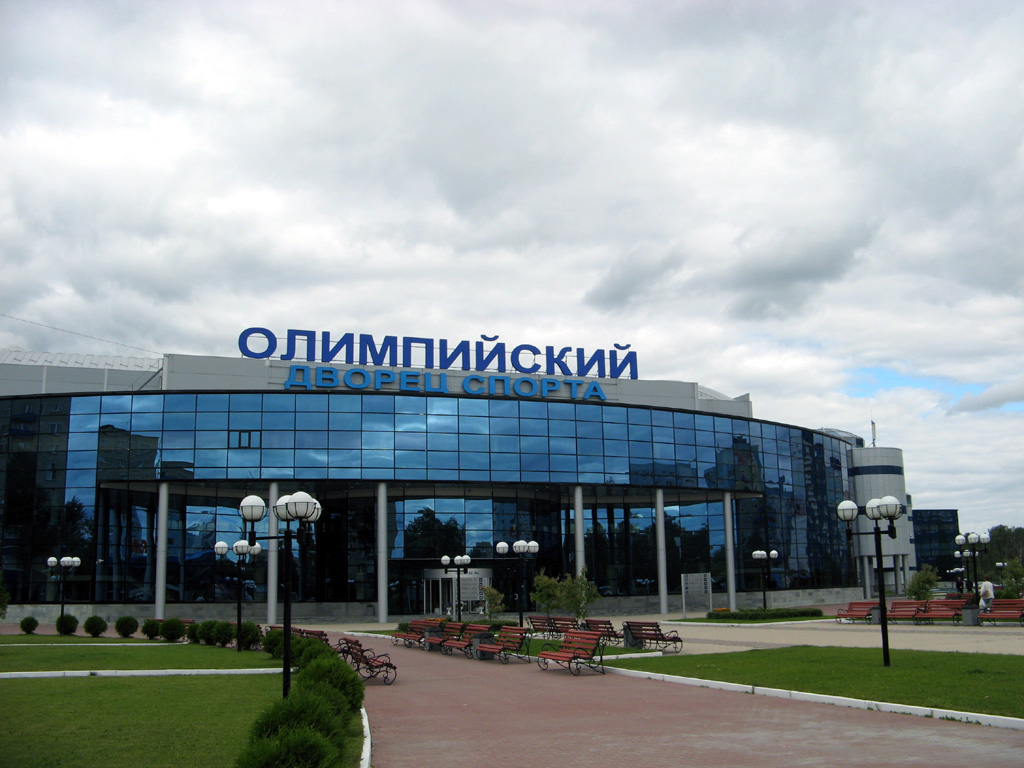
Olympic Sports Palace

In the summer of 2003, the Olympic Sports Palace was opened in Chekhov. The large sports arena and the swimming pool host international and national competitions, as well as exhibitions and concert programs. The arena hosted the EGF Champions League matches, the games of the Russian handball and mini-football championships, the international professional boxing tournament for the IBF Intercontinental World Champion title, the international handball tournament for the Governor's Cup of the Moscow Region, etc. The Sports Palace hosted the matches of the European Under-20 Basketball Championship in 2005. In 2007, the Russian Rhythmic Gymnastics Championship was held here. In the 2000s, the Sturm-2002 team, which became the champion of Russia in water polo, performed in the pool of the Olympic Sports Palace.

The Chaika club for people with disabilities operates, where about 50 people with musculoskeletal disorders and about 50 people with hearing disabilities are engaged. The athletes of this club became winners and prize-winners of regional competitions. Alexey Shcherbakov became the Russian archery champion and, competing at the World Championships in Seoul, took 7th place, which gave him the right to compete at the Paralympic Games in Beijing. Sergey Denisov is the world chess champion among walkers with musculoskeletal system damage in 2010.

The following sports teams are based in the city or were previously based in it:

Chekhov Bears is a handball team that is a 21-time champion of Russia, winner of the Cup of Cups in 2006.

Sturm-2002 — water polo team, four-time champion of Russia (since 2009 moved to Uzbekistan)

The Chekhov Hawks team are the champions of the Moscow region in basketball among young men born in 1991.

Fortuna is a mini-football team.

== Culture ==
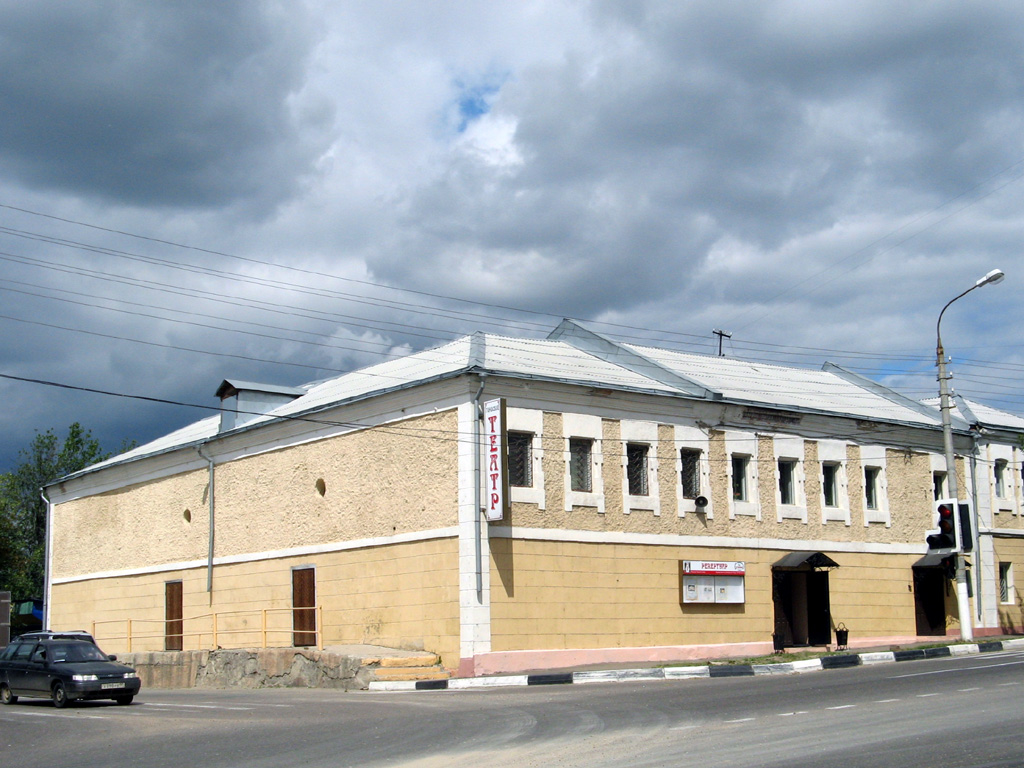
- theater in Chekhov
  Chekhov City Theater "Theater on Moskovskaya" (established in 2001)
- A. P. Chekhov's Museum of Letters
- Chekhov Memorial Museum 1941-1945
- Museum of Peasant Life
- Central Children's Library
- Inter-settlement Central Library

== Attractions ==
- The former Vasilchikov estate "Zachatyevskoye"
- The post office, built with the assistance of Anton Pavlovich Chekhov
- Anno-Zachatievskaya Church
- A. P. Chekhov Square
- The Holy Spring
- The Alley of Glory of the Defenders of the Fatherland
- Goncharov Manor City Park
- Monument to the T-34

== Religion ==
On the outskirts of Chekhov lies the Davidov Hermitage, reputedly the richest monastery in Russia. It contains many churches from the 17th and 18th centuries.

== Twin towns and sister cities ==
Chekhov is twinned with:

- Fastiv (Ukraine) (before the 2022 Russian invasion of Ukraine)
- Kapyl (Belarus)
- Krasnohvardiiske Raion (Ukraine) (before the 2022 Russian invasion of Ukraine)
- Ochamchira District (Abkhazia/Georgia)
- Pazardzhik (Bulgaria)
- Saratoga Springs (United States)

== Sources ==
- Губернатор Московской области. Постановление №123-ПГ от 28 сентября 2010 г. «Об учётных данных административно-территориальных и территориальных единиц Московской области», в ред. Постановления №252-ПГ от 26 июня 2015 г. «О внесении изменения в учётные данные административно-территориальных и территориальных единиц Московской области». Опубликован: "Информационный вестник Правительства МО", №10, 30 октября 2010 г. (Governor of Moscow Oblast. Resolution #123-PG of September 28, 2010 On the Inventory Data of the Administrative-Territorial and Territorial Units of Moscow Oblast, as amended by the Resolution #252-PG of June 26, 2015 On Amending the Inventory Data of the Administrative-Territorial and Territorial Units of Moscow Oblast. ).
- Московская областная Дума. Закон №77/2005-ОЗ от 28 февраля 2005 г. «О статусе и границах Чеховского муниципального района и вновь образованных в его составе муниципальных образований», в ред. Закона №10/2013-ОЗ от 30 января 2013 г. «О внесении изменений в Закон Московской области "О статусе и границах Чеховского муниципального района и вновь образованных в его составе муниципальных образований"». Вступил в силу со дня официального опубликования. Опубликован: "Ежедневные Новости. Подмосковье", №44, 12 марта 2005 г. (Moscow Oblast Duma. Law #77/2005-OZ of February 28, 2005 On the Status and the Borders of Chekhovsky Municipal District and the Newly Established Municipal Formations Comprising It, as amended by the Law #10/2013-OZ of January 30, 2013 On Amending the Law of Moscow Oblast "On the Status and the Borders of Chekhovsky Municipal District and the Newly Established Municipal Formations Comprising It". Effective as of the day of the official publication.).
- Устав городского округа Чехов Московской области [Charter of the urban settlement of Chekhov] (PDF) (in Russian)
- Dudarev, V. A.; Eliseeva, N. A., eds. (1980), Административно-территориальное деление союзных республик на 1 января 1980 года [Administrative-territorial division of the union republics on January 1, 1980] (in Russian), Moscow: Izvestia
