= Lev Khasis =

Russian businessman

Lev Aronovich Khasis (Russian: Лев Аронович Хасис; born 5 June 1966) is a businessman, manager, investor, and entrepreneur. He was born in Kuybyshev (now Samara), Russian SFSR, Soviet Union.

From 2006 to 2011, Khasis served as the first CEO of X5 Retail Group, a major Russian retail company. He then held senior positions at Walmart Stores Inc., including Senior Vice-President and CEO and President of New Formats, from 2011 to 2013. Khasis was also Vice-Chairman of Jet.com (Jet.com Inc) until the company was acquired by Walmart in 2016. Between 2014 and 2021, he served as a board member of several companies, including Kiavi.com, Momentus.space, Evotor, and DocDoc.

In 2013, Khasis was appointed First Deputy CEO of Sberbank, a position he held until February 2022. He resigned from Sberbank on 22 February 2022, reportedly in response to the impending Russian invasion of Ukraine, and subsequently left Russia.

Following the Russian invasion of Ukraine in 2022, Khasis was subjected to sanctions by the United Kingdom, Australia, and Canada. The United Kingdom lifted sanctions on Khasis on 6 July 2023, Canada followed on 10 November 2023, and Australia removed him from its sanctions list on 12 April 2024.

== Education ==
Lev Khasis completed the Stanford Executive Program at the Stanford Graduate School of Business. In 1989, he graduated from the Samara National Research University (formerly Kuybyshev Aviation Institute) with a degree in Aerospace Engineering. In 1995, he graduated from the Banking Faculty of the Financial University under the Government of the Russian Federation (formerly Moscow Financial Institute). In May 1998, he received a PhD in Aerospace Engineering from Samara National Research University (formerly Kuybyshev Aviation Institute), and in July 2006, he received a PhD in Economics from the Institute for System Analysis at the Russian Academy of Sciences.

== Career ==
He served in various roles in business and the academy.

- 1989–1990 – Head of the Department of International Affairs of Kuybyshev Aviation Institute
- 1991–1993 – CEO of JSC "Samarsky Trading House"
- 1993–1994 – Samara branch general manager, vice-president of «Avtovazbank»
- 1995–1999 – president, chairman of the board of directors of OJSC «Aviacor» Corporation
- 1996–1998 – vice-president of OJSC «Alfa-Bank»
- Since 1999 – member of the Board of Directors of ZAO Trading House «Supermarkets chain Perekrestok»
- 2001–2005 – Chairman of the Board of Directors of Trading House «TsUM» and Trading House «GUM (department store)»
- 2002 – 2006 – Chairman of the Board of Directors of Trading House «Supermarkets chain Perekrestok»
- 2006 – 2011 – Chief Executive Officer (CEO) of X5 Retail Group, the largest retail company in Russia
- 2007 – 2011 Chairman of the Association of Retailers of Russia (AKORT)
- 2005 – 2014 member of the Board of Directors of "Transaero" Airlines
- 2011 – 2012 Senior Vice-President and Chief Leverage Officer at Wal-Mart Stores Inc
- 2012–2013 CEO&President New Formats at Walmart Stores Inc
- 2015–2016 Vice-Chairman of Jet.com, Inc .
- 2017-2021 Board member of Boxed.com until its IPO
- 2017-2020 Board Member of Kiavi.com (www.Kiavi.com) (ex LendingHome.com)
- 2017 - Co-Founder of Momentus.space (www.Momentus.space)
- 2017-2020 - Chairman of the Board of Momentus.space
- September 2013 till February 2022 - First Deputy CEO at Sberbank
