= Kopeyka =

Kopeyka may refer to:

- Kopeyka (supermarket)
- Kopeyka (Russian: копейка) or kopek, 1/100 of a ruble in Russian/Soviet currency
- Kopeyka or VAZ-2101, an automobile manufactured from 1970 to 1984, ab bat of some sort
