= Sergey Sedov =

Russian serial killer, rapist and necrophile

- Born: Sergey Alexandrovich Sedov; 1979 (age 46–47); Moscow, RSFSR
- Other name: "The Sokolniki Maniac"
- Penalty: Involuntary commitment

Details
- Victims: 6
- Span of crimes: 1998–1999
- Country: Russia
- State: Moscow
- Date apprehended: October 18, 1999
- Imprisoned at: Psychiatric hospital №5 of FPS, Troitskoye, Chekhovsky District, Moscow Oblast

Sergey Alexandrovich Sedov (Russian: Сергей Александрович Седов; born 1979), known as The Sokolniki Maniac (Russian: Сокольнический маньяк), is a Russian serial killer who stabbed to death six people in Moscow's Sokolniki Park between 1998 and 1999. Deemed mentally unfit to stand trial, he was sent off to a psychiatric facility in the village of Troitskoye, where he remains to this day.

== Biography ==
A native Muscovite, Sedov grew up in a dysfunctional family, both of his parents being alcoholics. Ever since he was a child, Sergey suffered from hearing loss, and at school, he was put in a group for children with special needs. He was described as unsocial, and if he was offended by other children, he would run away, refusing to return to class for several days. His peculiar behavior led to examinations by several doctors in 1989, who concluded that the young Sergey was intellectually disabled. However, they deemed that treatment was unnecessary, as it was believed that he would pose no threat to others around him.

On the night of October 7, 1998, while wandering around Sokolniki Park at night, Sedov got into an argument with a drunk man. He then grabbed a metal pipe, with which he proceeded to beat the man to death, after which he sexually abused his corpse. Until his arrest on October 18, 1999, he would go on to commit five similar murders in the area, killing three victims with the metal pipe, one with a hammer and the final, his only female victim, with a pair of scissors.

On the day of his arrest, Sergey told one of his neighbors that he had just killed a person, but as he was known to be of unsound mind, the neighbor didn't believe his claims. Sedov then went to the park with him, where he showed the still-fresh crime scene. Alarmed, the neighbor phoned the authorities, who quickly arrested the killer and started to interrogate him. During the investigations, Sedov admitted to the six murders and that he had had sex with the victims' corpses. When queried about why he had done it, he claimed that an "inner voice" had told him to commit exactly six killings. One of the investigators asked what would happen if he were told to kill for example 12 people, to which Sergey replied "Orders are not being discussed. I would continue to kill."

In June 2000, Sedov was put on trial before the Eastern Moscow District Court, accused of murder, but the sexual assault charges were dropped, as they couldn't be proven. He was ordered to undertake an exam at the Serbsky Center, from which the doctors determined that he was criminally insane, had sexual sadism with necrophilic tendencies. As a result, the Moscow Court determined that he was mentally unfit to stand trial and sent him to a psychiatric hospital in the village of Troitskoye, where he would receive intensive treatment for the rest of his life.

== See also ==
- List of Russian serial killers
