= Stephan DuCharme =

American-German executive

- Born: 20 April 1964 (age 62); Addis Ababa, Ethiopia
- Citizenship: United States, Germany
- Occupations: Former Chairman, CEO, Managing Partner
- Organization(s): L1 Retail, Dia Group, X5 Retail Group

Stephan DuCharme (April 20, 1964, Addis Ababa, Ethiopia) is a German-American businessman who was the former chairman of Dia Group, managing partner at L1 Retail and both chairman and CEO of X5 Retail Group.

He is a citizen of United States of America and Germany. He is fluent in English, German, French, Spanish, Portuguese, and Russian.

== Career ==
=== Early career ===
DuCharme graduated with honors in Political Science and Economics in Political Science and Economics from the University of California, Berkeley (USA) and has an MBA degree from INSEAD business school. From 1987 to 1991, he was a financial analyst in Salomon Brothers Bank before joining the European Bank of Reconstruction and Development (EBRD), based in Moscow. In 1997, DuCharme joined Alfa Group as a director of corporate development, finance and oversight.

In 2001, DuCharme moved to London and joined SUN Group, where he particularly supervised SUN Interbrew.

DuCharme was a board member at CSA Czech Airlines, Alfa-Bank, and SUN Interbrew Ltd, and was a member of the supervisory board at Iberia Refreshments (Tbilisi, Georgia), as well as a member of the supervisory board at Concern Galnaftogas (Lviv, Ukraine). From December 2006 to September 2008, he was board member of the Siberian Coal Energy Company, where he served as an independent advisor.

=== X5 Retail Group ===
In 2008, DuCharme joined the board of X5. In July 2012, after persistently weak sales, Andrei Gusev was replaced as CEO of X5 Retail Group initially on a temporary basis by DuCharme. In January 2013, the supervisory board of X5 nominated DuCharme to take over the CEO position on a permanent basis subject to shareholder approval. DuCharme’s strategy included the introduction of a new operating model, the introduction of refreshed commercial value propositions, the refurbishment of stores and introduction of new management structures. Under his tenure, DuCharme’s strategy improved the company’s performance and growth against competitors such as Magnit, especially from 2014 onwards.

In September 2015, it was announced that DuCharme would step down as CEO of X5 and become chairman of the group's supervisory board. In 2017, X5 retook its position from Magnit as Russia’s biggest food retailer.

On 1 March 2022, X5 Retail Group announced that DuCharme had resigned as a member of the X5 supervisory board with immediate effect.

=== L1 Retail and Dia Group ===
In late 2016, L1 Retail was set up as a division of LetterOne holding company with DuCharme appointed as the fund’s managing partner. The group’s first purchase, the £1.8 billion acquisition of the UK’s largest health food retailer Holland and Barrett from the US private equity firm The Carlyle Group, was announced in June 2017.

In July 2017, it was announced that L1 had bought a 3% stake in Spanish supermarket chain Dia, which gradually increased to just under 30% by October 2018.

In February 2019, L1 made an offer to buy out the remaining shareholders following the group’s announcement of a €352.6m loss in 2018. DuCharme led efforts to financially restructure the group to avoid potential bankruptcy and was involved in the devising of a transformation plan. On 21 May 2019, following completion of negotiations with Dia Group’s creditors and with a majority of Dia Group now owned by L1, DuCharme was appointed as non-executive Chairman of Dia Group.

In April 2020, it was announced that DuCharme would take on executive functions with his role, effective from 20 May of that year, after Karl-Heinz Holland stepped down as CEO.

On 7 June 2022, DuCharme was re-elected as executive director of Dia Group at the General Shareholders’ Meeting.

In August 2022 the company separated the role of CEO and chairman. DuCharme returned to his role as non-executive chairman and Martín Tolcachir, until then CEO of Dia Argentina, was appointed Global CEO of Dia Group.

DuCharme resigned as managing partner of L1 Retail in September 2023, also stepping down as chair of the board of direors at Dia Group at that time.

== See also ==
- Alfa Group
- X5 Retail Group
- Mikhail Fridman

== Links ==
- Telitsyna, Irina (2016-11-16). "Stefan DuСharme: "Faith is an important element of success" (in Russian)". forbes.ru.
- Dulenkova, Anastasia (2015-08-27). ""It is important to have a strong competitor to be on your toes" (in Russian)". kommersant.ru.
- "Transformation. Review. March 2015 (in Russian)" (PDF). bcg.ru. The Boston Consulting Group.
- ""I did not come here to do cosmetics" - Stefan DuСharme, CEO of X5 Retail Group (in Russian)". «Vedomosti» newspaper. 2014-03-25.
