= Magnit =

Russian retail company

PJSC Magnit
- Native name: ПAO «Магнит»
- Type: Public (PAO)
- Traded as: MCX: MGNT; LSE: MGNT
- Industry: Retail
- Founded: 1994; 32 years ago
- Founder: Sergei Galitsky
- Headquarters: Russia, Krasnodar
- Number of locations: 18,399 (2018)
- Key people: Jan Dunning (CEO)
- Products: Consumer goods
- Revenue: $41.9 billion (2025)
- Operating income: $1.59 billion (2025)
- Net income: −$377 million (2025)
- Total assets: $23.3 billion (2025)
- Total equity: $1.79 billion (2025)
- Number of employees: 300,000
- Website: magnit.ru

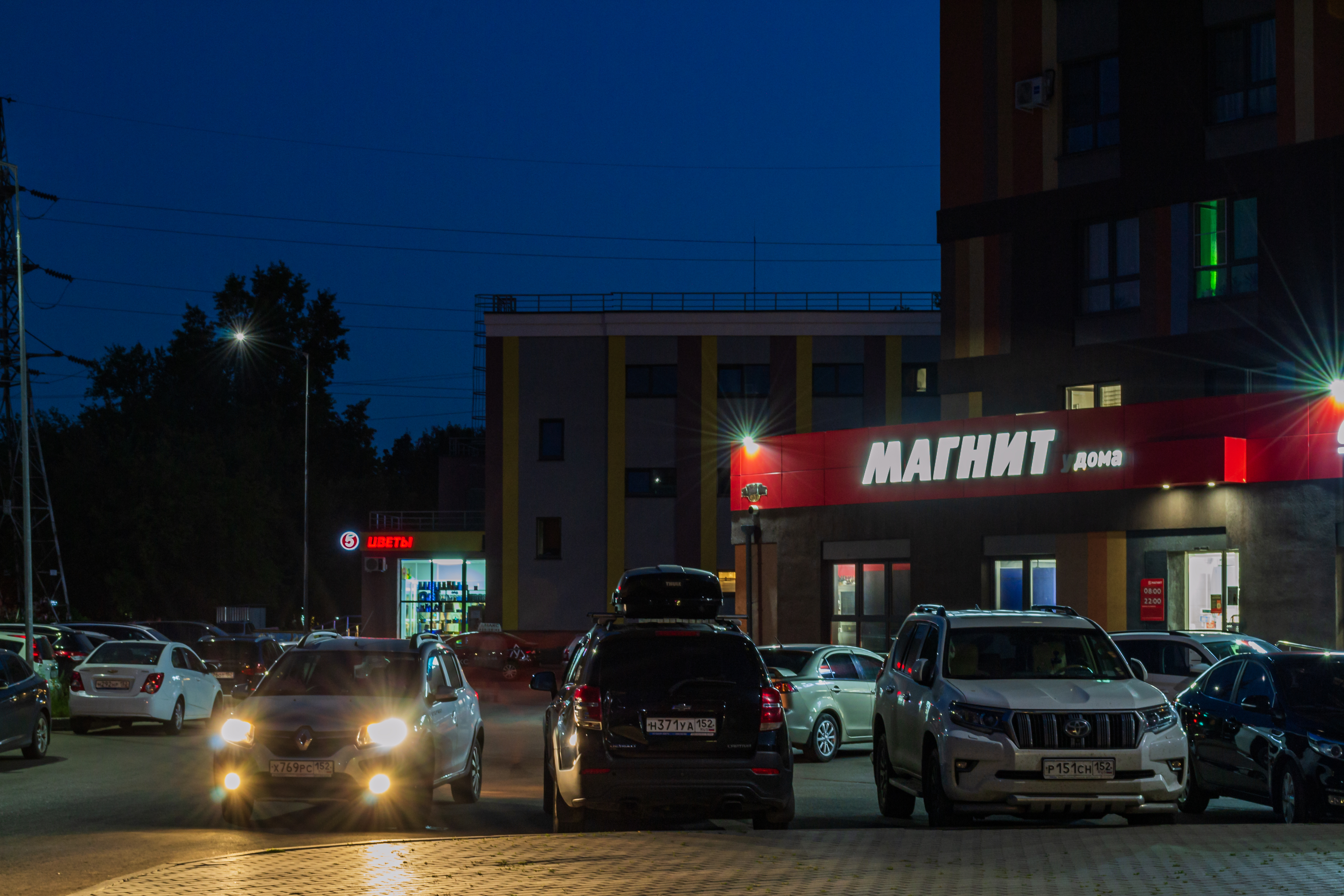
Magnit store on Gleb Uspensky Street, 1k3 in Nizhny Novgorod

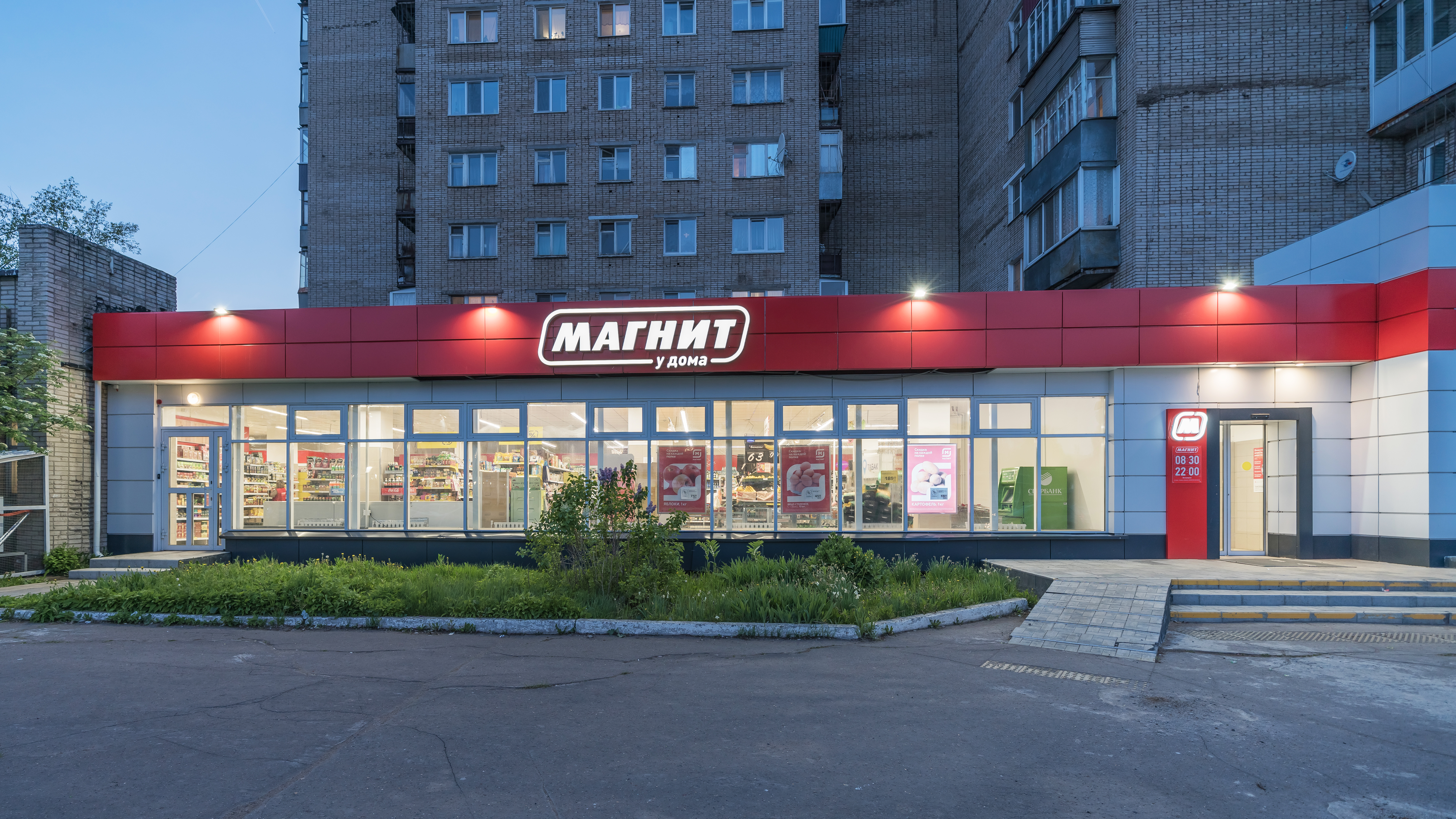
Magnit shop in Glazov

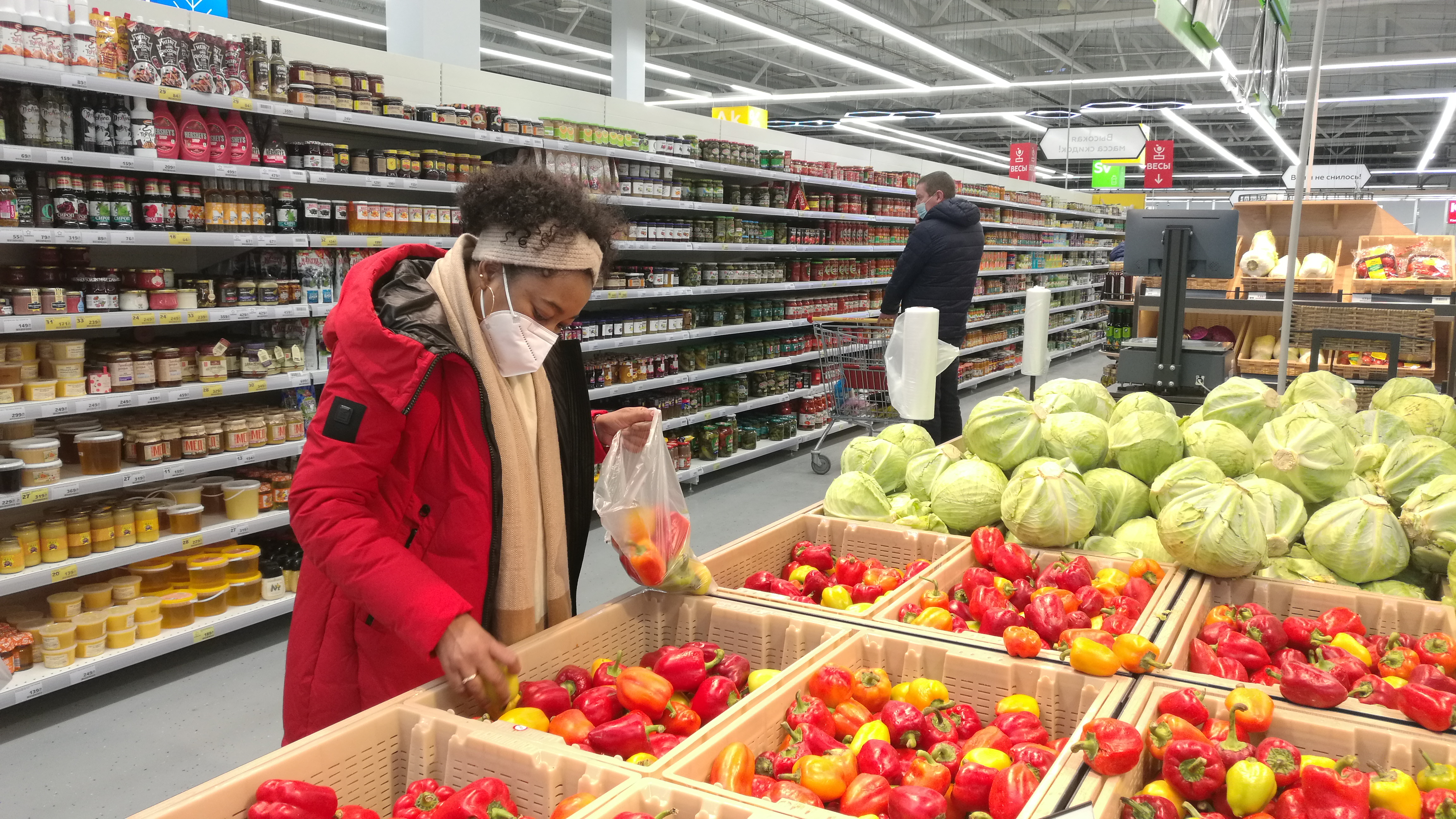
Magnit Extra shop in Tyumen

Magnit (Магнит, "Magnet") is one of Russia's largest food retailers. It was founded in 1994 in Krasnodar by Sergey Galitsky. As of March 2016, the company had 12,434 stores in 2,385 locations. They include 9,715 convenience stores, 225 hypermarkets, 2,337 Magnit Cosmetics stores, and 157 Magnit family stores. The company employs more than 140,000 people and has been opening several dozen stores each month.

Since 2006, the company has developed a chain of "Magnit" hypermarkets in many Russian cities and towns. It overtook its rival X5 Group as Russia's largest retailer in terms of sales in April 2013, although it is still under-represented in Moscow. As of July 2014, it is the world's fourth largest retailer by market capitalization. However, the largest retailer in Russia in 2017 is the X5 Group. Evgeny Nikolaevich Kubrik has been the head of the company since 2018.

Since November 2021 Marathon Group owned by Alexander Vinokurov has become the largest shareholder

== History ==
The founder of Magnit retail chain, Sergey Galitsky, established JSC Tander in 1995.

In 2004, the retail chain was "rebooted", adopting the convenience store format. At the same time, the company was wrapping up its wholesale operations that distributed household chemicals and perfumes, and switched capacity from its Krasnodar-based trade centre to the distribution complex in Kropotkin. Six years after its establishment, the Magnit retail chain expanded to 1,000 stores nationwide. In 2005, the number of stores had already reached 1,500; the company surpassed Pyaterochka in total revenue.

In 2010, Deloitte – a multinational consulting services provider – included Magnit in its list of the world's top 250 retailers. The same year, the company opened its first store under the drogerie format – Magnit Cosmetic.

In 2014, Magnit became the largest Russian importer. During the same year, its stores were equipped with cashless payment terminals and started introducing self-service checkouts. The company began construction of its own greenhouse complex in Krasnodar Krai. In 2015, Magnit became the first Russian chain to reach the 10,000-store milestone, demonstrating record growth rates. Analytical data showed that every 10th ruble spent by Russian households went to Magnit.

In 2017, Magnit increased the number of its distribution centres to 36. The company also launched the first Magnit Pharmacy and Magnit Cash&Carry stores. The same year, operations started at its button mushroom production facility, the largest of its kind in Russia. In 2017, Magnit was placed 3rd in Baker Tilly's list of Russian businesses with the highest intellectual capital. In 2018, the company opened outlets in the offices of Russian Post. The same year, Magnit joined the ranks of the world's largest public companies in Forbes' Global 2000, becoming the only Russian retailer on the list.

In 2018, Marathon Group acquired 11,82% stake in Magnit from VTB

In early June 2018, Magnit announced that it began negotiations with Marathon Group to acquire JSC SIA International Ltd – SIA Group's pharmaceutical distributor. Later, in October that year, the acquisition was approved by Magnit's Board of Directors. It was noted that the transaction amount, which was stated at 5.7 billion rubles or less, would be paid in Magnit's securities. Additionally, under the agreement, Marathon Group undertook not to sell Magnit's shares for at least three years after the deal was closed. The acquisition was a part of development strategy for Magnit Cosmetic and Pharmacy businesses.

In June 2018, Magnit and Russian Post started piloting post office-based outlets in Moscow, Krasnodar Krai, and Ryazan Oblast.

On 29 February 2019, the Magnit retail chain announced that it would update its brand identity in accordance with the new cross-format concept. After the update, all stores would have the same visual style and share the same slogan: "Let's bring families together!".

Since May 2019, Marathon Group's President Alexander Vinokurov has become a Member of Magnit's Board of Directors.

Magnit announced its 2023 Development Strategy in September 2018. The company plans to increase its market share in Russia from 6% to 15%.

In May 2021, «Magnit» announced the upcoming purchase of a controlling stake in all «Dixy» stores for 92.4 billion rubles. The «Dixy» chain comprises 2,600 stores, half of which are located in Moscow and the Moscow region. It is assumed that «Dixy» will continue to operate as an independent legal entity, and all stores will continue to operate under their own brand. In July, the FAS approved the deal, but put forward restrictions: the merger of networks is possible only in those municipalities where the share of «Magnit» doesn't exceed 25%. As a result, 142 «Dixy» stores will not be included in the «Magnit» network.

In October 2021, "Magnit" opened in Krasnodar, the first pharmacy darkstore with an expanded range of products to supply an online demand in about 30 drugstores. Customers can also book their purchases in Moscow, Saint-Petersburg, Karelia as well as in Leningrad, Murmansk, Novgorod, Pskov and Tver Oblast regions. During 2021, "Magnit" also started cooperating with drugstore marketplaces.

In November 2021, Marathon Group increased its stake to 29,2% and became the largest shareholder.

In June 2023, Magnit offered foreign investors the opportunity to repurchase their shares, which they could no longer trade, at a 50% discount. The company announced its readiness to repurchase 10% of its shares for 22.57 billion rubles. The government approved the tender, and investors will be able to withdraw the money received from Russia in dollars, euros, or yuan. When it turned out that the offer was in demand, Magnit increased the quota to 29.8% (30,370,000 shares).

In January 2024, the Federal Antimonopoly Service of Russia approved the purchase by Magnit of 33% of the largest retail chain Samberi in the Far East (the name is formed by merging words in the expression "take it yourself") with a five-year option for the remaining share.

== Finance ==
According to the quarterly statements for the second quarter of 2019, dated 25 July 2019, Magnit reported a total revenue of 342.9 billion rubles, with an IFRS 16-adjusted net income of 2.5 billion rubles. In 2022, the company's revenue amounted to 881 billion rubles.

== Management ==
Sergey Galitsky served as the CEO of Magnit Group since its establishment and until February 2018. In February 2018, Galitsky made the decision to sell the majority of his stake in the company to VTB Bank. After the deal, a new board of directors was elected, and a new management team was formed.

In May 2018 Magnit hired Olga Naumova as CEO. As from 26 June 2019, Jan Dunning serves as Magnit's CEO (succeeding Olga Naumova, who left the company in the second quarter of 2019). Dunning also holds the office of the chain's President, having been appointed on 17 January 2019.

== In-house production facilities ==
During the 2015 International Investment Forum in Sochi, Magnit signed an investment agreement for development of an industrial park in Dorozhny village in Krasnodar Krai. The park would cover over 236 hectares and have more than 20 tenants, with the amount of investment planned until the end of 2020 totaling at over 40 billion rubles. In 2018, operations began at the first production facility – Kubanskiy Kombinat Khleboproduktov (Russian: "Кубанский комбинат хлебопродуктов" – Kuban Cereal Products Factory), one of the largest of its kind in Russia. Its output would cover up to 60% of the chain's demand for pasta, bread, and bakery products.

== Staff ==
According to Forbes, Magnit is one of the largest Russian employers, with over 280 thousand employees as of 2017, in 2021 Magnit became one of the largest Russian employers (the number of employees was about 316,000 people, the average salary according to the company in 2020 is 38,240 rubles).

As of 26 July 2019, the company employs 300,000 employees. Of these, 78% are women and 22% are men.

In 2023, the company began a targeted recruitment of employees from other countries, including Uzbekistan, Kyrgyzstan, and India.

== Awards ==
From 2011 to 2018, Magnit received the title of "Attractive Employer" from the Superjob.ru award. In 2021, Magnit received platinum (the highest) status in the ranking of the best employers according to Forbes.
