= Sergey Galitsky =

Russian billionaire businessman

- Сергей Галицкий
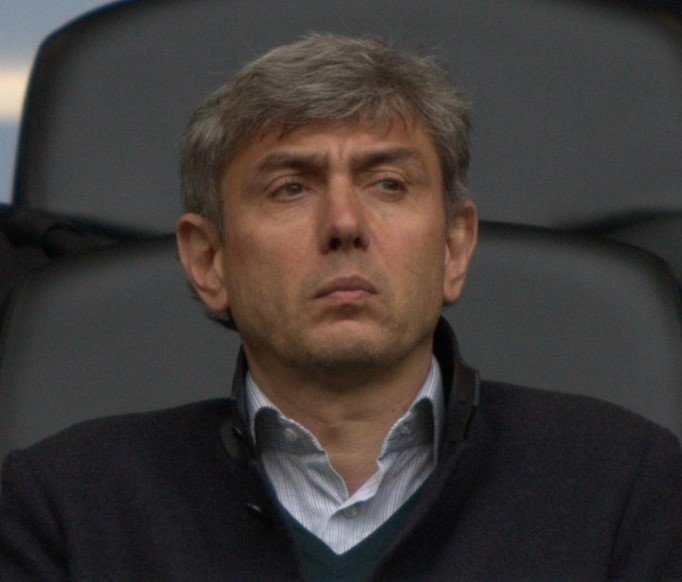
- Galitsky in 2017
- Born: 14 August 1967 (age 58); Sochi, Russian SFSR, Soviet Union (now Russia)
- Occupations: Co-Owner of Magnit; Owner of FC Krasnodar
- Spouse: Viktoria Galitskaya
- Children: 1 daughter

Sergey Nikolayevich Galitsky (Russian: Серге́й Николаевич Га́лицкий; born Sergey Nikolayevich Arutyunyan) is a Russian billionaire businessman, the founder and co-owner of Magnit, Russia's largest retailer, and president of FC Krasnodar. In 2021 Forbes Russia estimated his fortune at $3.5 billion.

== Early life ==
Sergey Arutyunyan was born on 14 August 1967, in Lazarevskoye, a suburb of Sochi, southern Russia, his mother is Russian and his father is Russian-Armenian. He later adopted his wife's surname. In 1985–87, Galitsky completed his compulsory service in the Soviet army.

== Career ==
In 1989, being a second-year student, began working in one of the commercial banks of Krasnodar. In 1993, he graduated from the Economics faculty of Kuban State University. A year later, he founded the company, "Transasia", which traded wholesale cosmetics and perfumery. In 1995, he came out of this business and founded the company "Tander". In 1998, he built the first distribution center, and immediately after the 1998 Russian financial crisis, opened the first grocery store "Magnit" in Krasnodar. In 2000, he switched to retail, and created the largest network by number of stores in Russia. In 2006, the company conducted its IPO and was valued at $1.9 billion.

In 2008 he founded FC Krasnodar, and in 2013 he financed the construction of the stadium of the same name for this club. In 2017, a large regular park was established around the stadium, later further expanded throughout the following decade to become one of the city's best-known sights. Despite being eponymous with the stadium and the city, it is better known not as Krasnodar park but as Galitsky park.

In 2018, Galitsky sold a 29.1% stake in the Magnit retail chain to Russian bank VTB for 138 billion rubles.

In 2019, Galitsky got into the wine business. Grapes are grown near the village of Gostagaevskaya in Krasnodar Krai. The wine is sold under the brand name Galitsky & Galitsky.

== Personal life ==
He was married to Viktoria Galitskaya, and they have one daughter, Polina Galitskaya. In June 2023, Russian media reported that Viktoria died on 14 June 2023 in Italy at the age of 51, Galitsky's press representative refused to provide an official comment.

In March 2022, Forbes reported that the megayacht Quantum Blue was owned by Galitsky. Registered in the Cayman Islands with a value of $213 million at 341 feet, on March 22, it was recorded off the coast of Oman.
