= Chekhovsky District =

Chekhovsky District Чеховский район (Russian)
- District
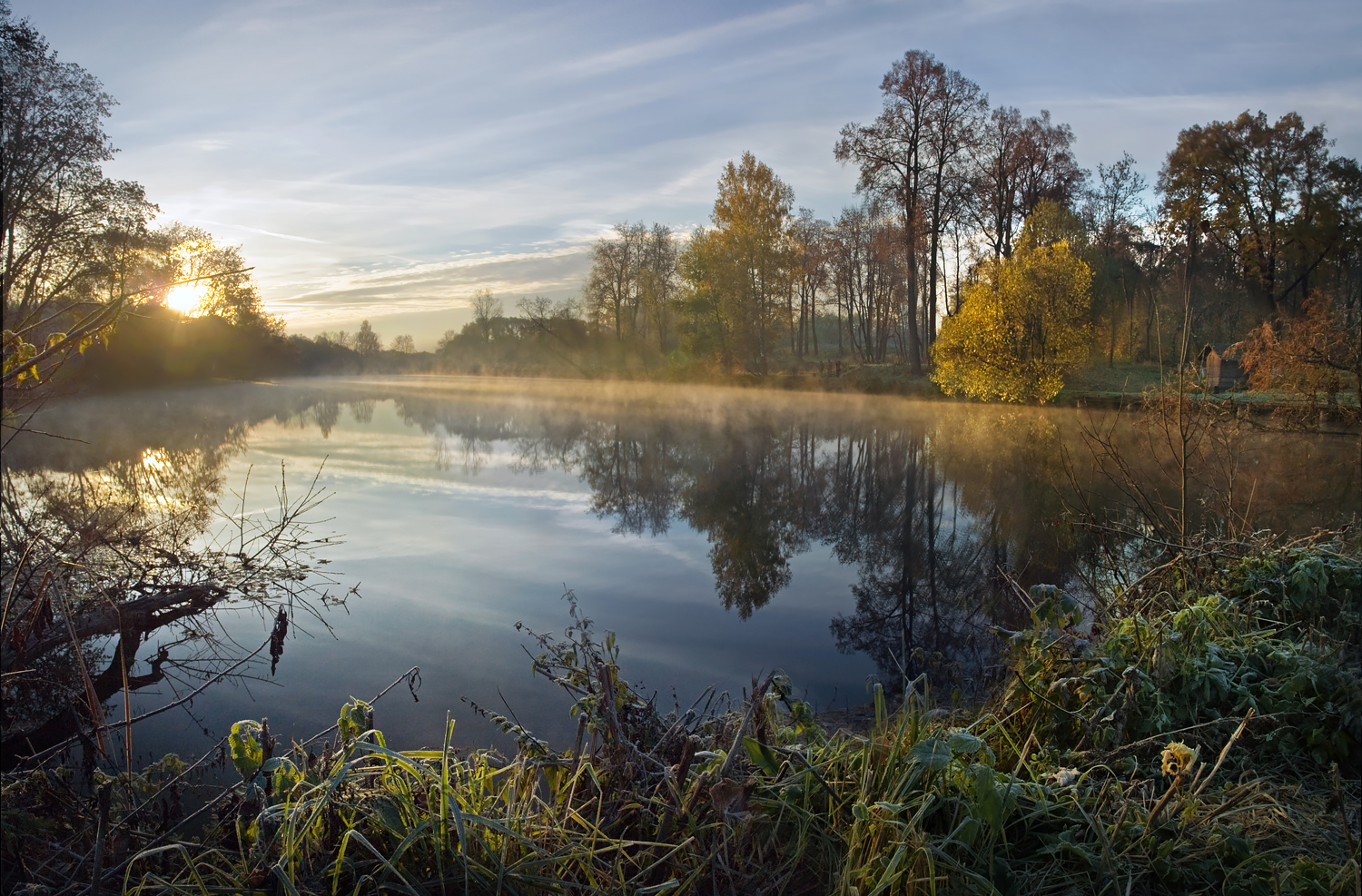
- Park with ponds: Pushkinskaya street, Chekhov, Chekhovsky District

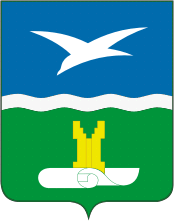
- Flag Coat of arms
- Location of Chekhovsky District in Moscow Oblast (before July 2012)
- Coordinates: 55°09′N 37°29′E
- Country: Russia
- Federal subject: Moscow Oblast
- Established: 12 July 1929
- Administrative center: Chekhov

Area
  - Total: 865.85 km^{2} (334.31 sq mi)

Population (2010 Census)
  - Total: 115,301
  - Density: 133.17/km^{2} (344.90/sq mi)
  - Urban: 57.1%
  - Rural: 42.9

Administrative structure
  - Administrative divisions: 1 Towns, 1 Work settlements, 3 Rural settlements
  - Inhabited localities: 1 cities/towns, 1 urban-type settlements, 144 rural localities

Municipal structure
  - Municipally incorporated as: Chekhovsky Municipal District
  - Municipal divisions: 2 urban settlements, 3 rural settlements
- Website: http://www.chekhov-city.ru

Chekhovsky District (Russian: Че́ховский райо́н) is an administrative and municipal district (raion), one of the thirty-six in Moscow Oblast, Russia. It is located in the south of the oblast. The area of the district is 865.85 square kilometers (334.31 sq mi). Its administrative center is the town of Chekhov. Population: 115,301 (2010 census); 109,668 (2002 Census); 39,448 (1989 Soviet census). The population of Chekhov accounts for 52.7% of the district's total population.
