= Kopeyka (supermarket) =

Russian retail chain

Kopeika
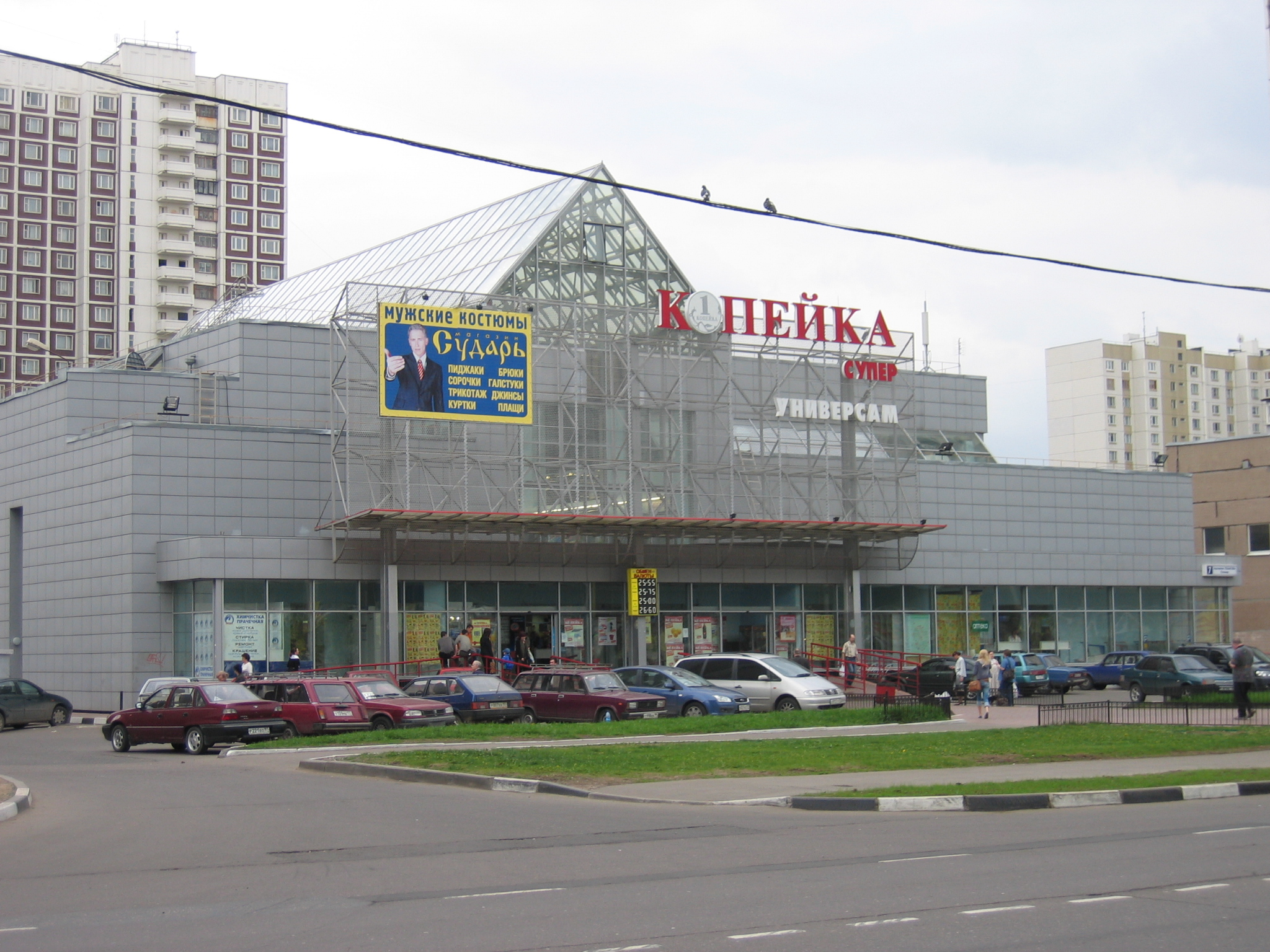
- Kopeika store in Yuzhnoye Butovo District
- Native name: Копейка
- Industry: Food and household goods retail
- Genre: store chain
- Incorporated: Russia
- Founded: 1998
- Defunct: 2011
- Fate: acquired by Pyaterochka

Kopeyka (Russian: Копейка, romanized: Kopeyka, lit. 'kopek') was a Russian retail chain. It collapsed in 2010–2011 as a result of the Great Recession.

Kopeyka was founded in 1998 with 38 stores. The grocer gained wider prominence when it was taken over by the ill-fated Yukos oil giant in 2002. On the latter's demise a controlling stake was sold to NIKOIL. In 2006 50% was sold on to another local chain by which time there were 267 stores and 4 distribution centers.

In 2010, Kopeyka was acquired by competitor Pyaterochka, part of the X5 Retail Group, for $1.65 billion. By the end of 2011, 616 Kopeyka stores had been rebranded and 44 stores had been shut down.

== Operation ==
At the end of the 1st quarter of 2012, the updated Kopeyka minimarket network included 4 stores located in Moscow and the Moscow region.

As of January 2011, the network included 624 stores operating in the discounter format, located in 25 regions of the Russian Federation. Some of these stores operated under franchise conditions. A feature of the Kopek franchise (unlike its competitor, the Pyaterochka chain) was the possibility of selling a franchise, including opening a single store (and not immediately an entire network, like Pyaterochka). The average network margin in Kopeyka stores, according to its CEO, was 21% in mid-2008.

The network's revenue in 2009 according to IFRS amounted to 54.9 billion rubles. (for 2008 — 47.0 billion rubles), EBITDA — 3.7 billion rubles, profit — 1.63 billion rubles.
