= Pyaterochka =

Supermarket chain in Russia

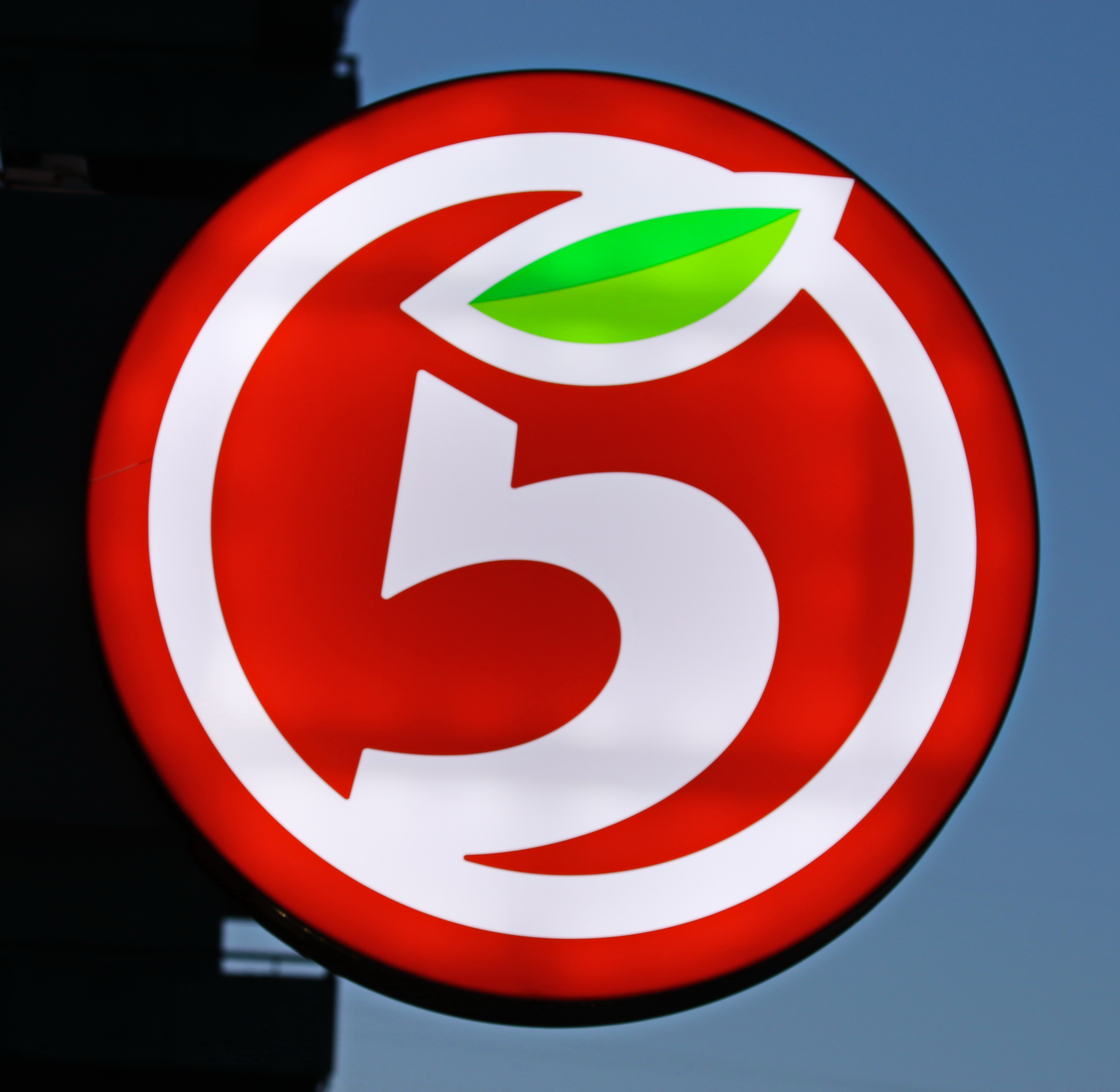

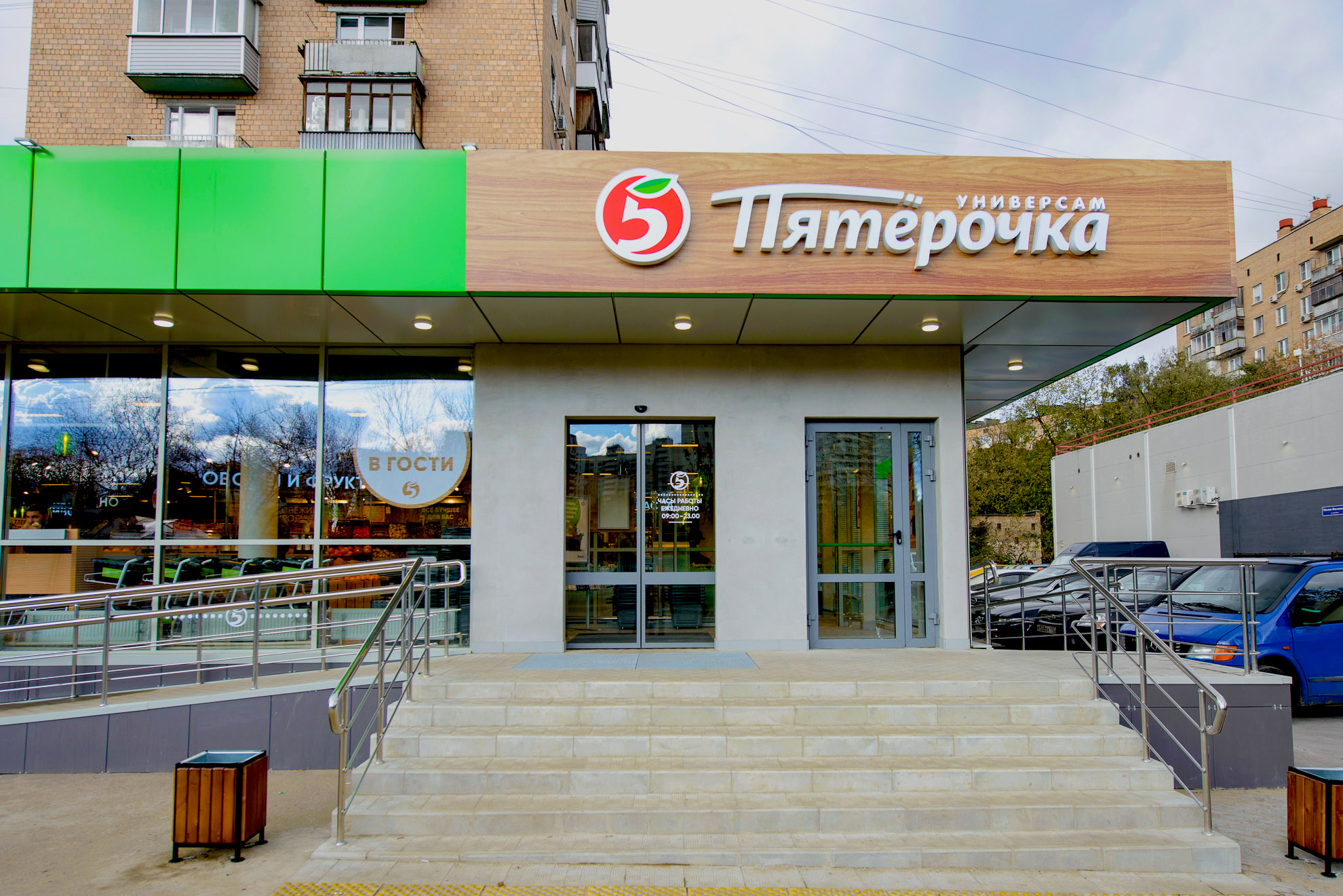
- Moscow proximity stores Pyaterochka in the new concept of 2019
- Native name: Пятёрочка
- Romanized name: Pyaterochka
- Industry: Retail
- Founded: 1999; 27 years ago in St. Petersburg, Russia
- Revenue: 1,198,000,000,000 Russian ruble (2018)
- Number of employees: 141,200
- Website: 5ka.ru

Pyaterochka (Russian: Пятёрочка, romanized: Pyatyorochka, lit. 'Five') is a Russian chain of convenience stores managed by X5 Retail Group. The chain opened its 15,000th store in the city of Zelenograd, Russia, in May 2019.

== History ==
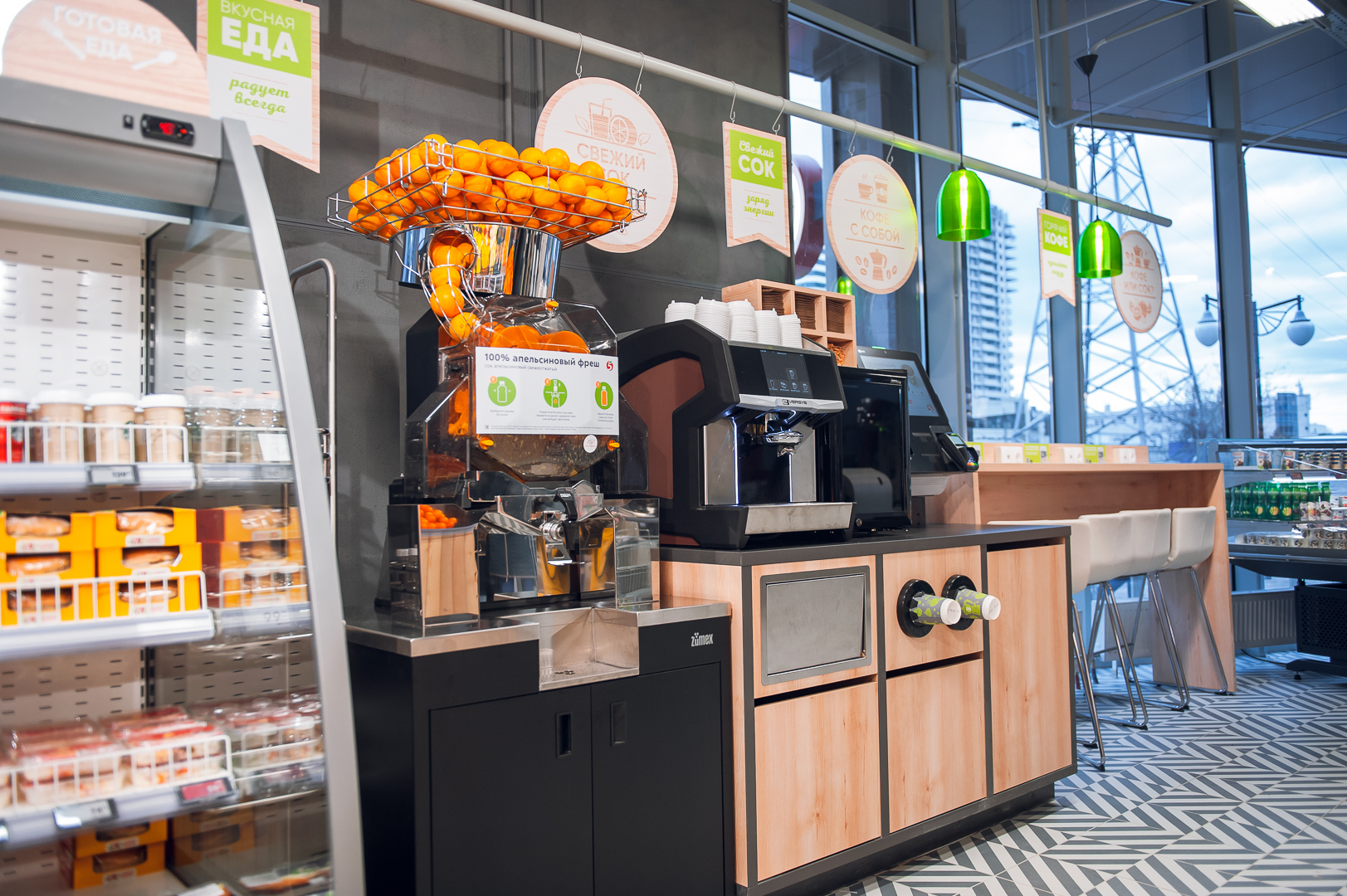
Interior of a Moscow proximity stores Pyaterochka in the new concept of 2019

The chain opened its first store in 1999 in Saint Petersburg. Pyaterochka expanded its market to Moscow in 2001 and started a franchise program a year later. Pyaterochka Holding N.V. completed an initial public offering on the London Stock Exchange in 2005. Pyaterochka and Perekrestok merged in 2006 to create X5 Retail Group; the group kept the Pyaterochka brand.

In 2009 X5 Retail Group acquired Kopeyka, a retail chain with more than 660 stores and seven distribution centers. All Kopeyka stores were rebranded to Pyaterochka.

Pyaterochka launched a store refurbishment program in 2013 to introduce a new range of products, and to make the store layout more spacious. Most of the stores were refurbished with a glass-front design. The Pyaterochka brand of discount stores is the core format for X5 Retail Group, followed by the Perekrestok supermarket chain.

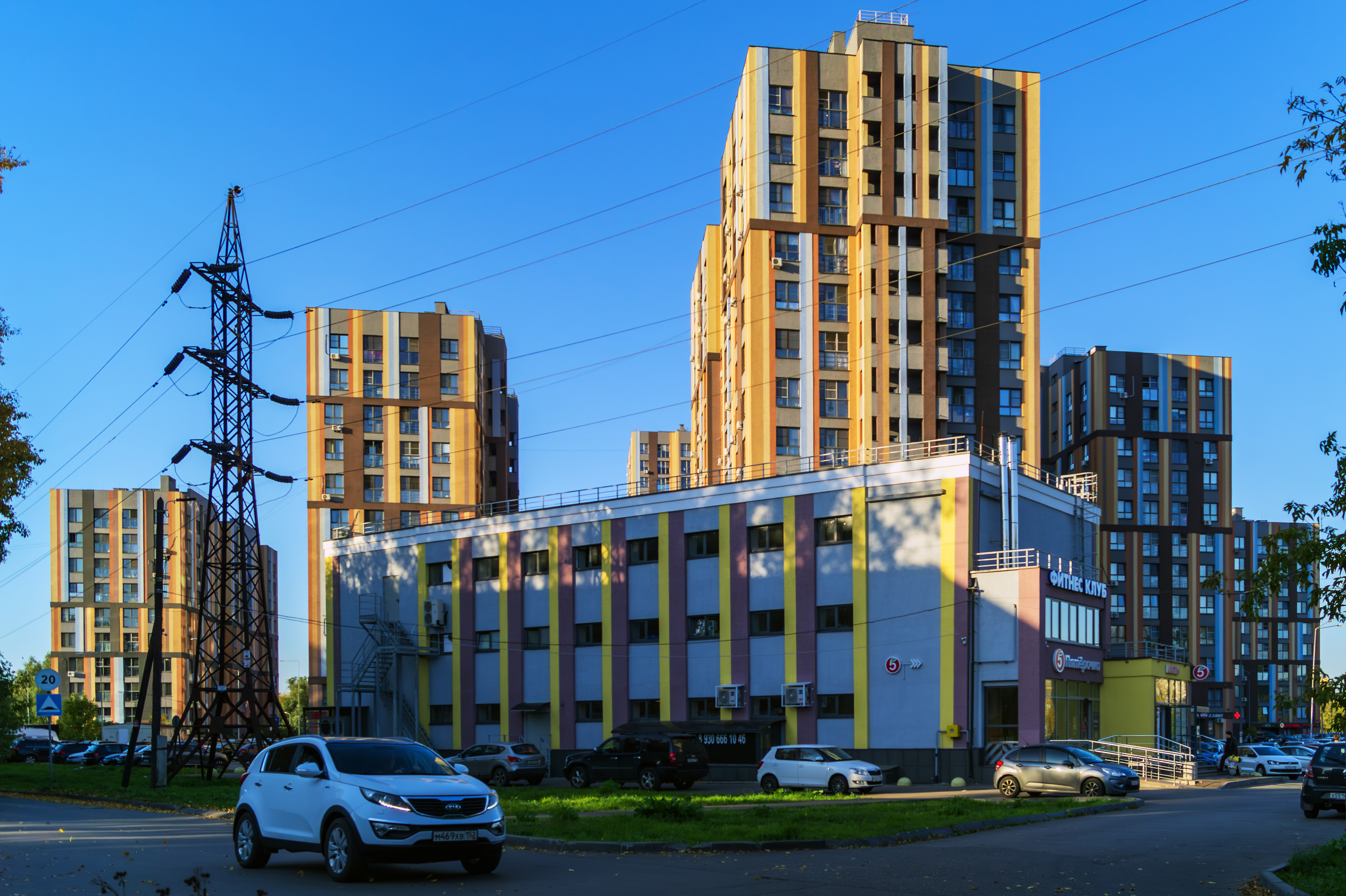
Oktava Housing estate and Pyaterochka in Leninsky district of Nizhny Novgorod, september 2025

Pyaterochka launched a store refurbishment program in 2019. Most of the stores were refurbished with a glass-front design. The new Pyaterochka would offer almost twice as many fresh products in a selling area of around 150 square meters, which is about half of the sales floor. Vegetables, fruits, and some of the perishable items are laid out in a dedicated fresh zone. The rebranded Pyaterochka sells a wide assortment of foods and ready-to-eat meals and has a special area where customers can have a coffee or fresh orange juice and charge their electronics. An in-store bakery made it possible to expand the offering of bread and pastry.

X5 launched an express delivery service from Pyaterochka stores at the end of 2019. As of April 2020, the service is available in Moscow, Lyubertsy, Skhodnya and Kazan.

== Key metrics ==
As of 31 December 2019, Pyaterochka operated 15,354 proximity stores, which generated a revenue of 1.367 trillion rubles.

Key operating metrics of Pyaterochka (as of 31 December)
Parameter / Year	2010*	2011	2012	2013	2014	2015	2016	2017	2018	2019
Number of stores	▲2,052	▲2,525	▲3,220	▲3,882	▲4,789	▲6,265	▲8,363	▲11,225	▲13,522	▲15,354
Selling space, in thousands of square meters	▲881	▲996	▲1,191	▲1,414	▲1,754	▲2,423	▲3,329	▲4,426	▲5,291	▲5,975
Net retail revenue, in billions of rubles	▲194.8	▲282.8	▲317.7	▲348.4	▲435.8	▲585.4	▲775.6	▲1,001	▲1,198	▲1,367
Customer visits, in millions	▲831	▲1,211	▲1,353	▲1,450	▲1,645	▲1,990	▲2,543	▲3,367	▲3,913	▲4,460

- Including Kopeyka stores.

== IT and innovations ==
In the spring of 2017 Pyaterochka began to automate its recruitment efforts. The automated system searches through curriculum vitae for a predetermined set of parameters and automatically calls matching candidates to invite them to open positions at the company. The automated system uses speech recognition technology with a female-voiced robot, Vera, and a male-voiced robot, Yermil, to transfer interested candidates to a human recruitment specialist.

X5 Retail Group launched an online service in February 2018 that calculates the average rent that a Pyaterochka store pays anywhere that it has a presence. Based on this information, property owners whose property meets the chain's criteria can send offers to X5 Retail Group.

In October 2018 X5 Retail Group has opened a 'lab store' based on Pyaterochka in Moscow, to test new technologies that will enhance customer experience. Engineers in the lab conduct in-store trials of electronic shelf labelling, video analytics, smart shelves, digital information panels, and self-scanning and self-checkout systems. If a technology works out in the lab, it will move on for pilot testing in Pyaterochka, Perekrestok and Karusel stores, where X5 experts will also assess the viability and impact of these technologies on sales and costs. Based on the results of the pilot stage, a final decision is made on the implementation of the new technology in X5 stores.

X5 Retail has begun installing self-checkout machines across its Pyaterochka proximity stores in April 2020. Tested successfully in August and September last year, these self-checkouts are now already installed at 369 stores. The plan for 2020 is to have a total of 12,000 units operating.

== Logistics ==
As of 31 December 2019, Pyaterochka operates 31 distribution centers.

== Cultural facts ==
Pyaterochka purchased the rights to the animated series Well, Just You Wait! (Russian: Ну, погоди!, romanized: Nu, pogodi!) in February 2005. Director Aleksey Kotyonochkin, the son of animator Vyacheslav Kotyonochkin, created two new episodes—number 19 in 2005 and number 20 in 2006—for Pyaterochka.

In January 2013 X5 Retail Group signed an agreement with the Sochi 2014 Organizing Committee to be the official retail partner of the 2014 Winter Olympics in Sochi. Under the agreement, around 1,000 licensed Olympic souvenirs were available from Pyaterochka stores in 45 Russian regions.

== Management ==
1998-2004 — Sergey Lepkovich

2004-2012 — Oleg Vysotsky

2012-2013 — Frank Mros

2013-2018 — Olga Naumova

2018 (April–June) — Igor Shekhterman (Chief Executive Officer of X5 Retail Group, he also served as the general director of the retail chain Pyaterochka)

June 2018 - January 2022 — Sergey Goncharov

From January 2022 — Vladislav Kurbatov
