= X5 Group =

Russian food retailer

- Traded as: LSE: FIVE; MCX: FIVE
- Industry: retail
- Founded: 2006
- Headquarters: Moscow, Russia
- Key people: Igor Shekhterman
- Revenue: $36.9 billion (2023)
- Operating income: $2.09 billion (2023)
- Net income: $923 million (2023)
- Total assets: $18.6 billion (2023)
- Total equity: $2.46 billion (2023)
- Website: x5.ru/en/

X5 Group (previously known as X5 Retail Group and commonly known as X5) is Russia's largest food retailer. In 2012, the organization of X5-Retail Group LLC was liquidated, and in 2018 X5 Group LLC was opened.

The company operates several retail formats: convenience stores under the Pyaterochka brand, supermarkets under the Perekrestok brand, and hypermarkets under the Karusel supermarket brand, as well as the Perekrestok.ru online market, the 5Post parcel, and Dostavka.Pyaterochka and Perekrestok.Bystro food delivery services.

The company's global depositary receipts are listed on the London Stock Exchange (LSE) and the Moscow Stock Exchange (MSE).

Its share of the food retail market rose up from 47th to 42nd place among the world's Top-250 retailers in the Global Powers of Retailing 2020 and took 11th place in the Top-50 fast-growing global retailers (according to Deloitte); it was ranked 41st among the Top 50 Global Retailers (according to Kantar Consulting).

In March 2021, after trials at 52 supermarkets, the group (in partnership with Visa and Sber) launched 'pay with a glance' biometrics at self-service checkout terminals in its supermarkets and convenience stores. The facial recognition payment system is expected to be expanded to 3,000 X5-owned stores by the end of 2021.

== History ==
In 1995, the first Perekrestok store was opened in Moscow. In 1999, the Pyaterochka retail chain was founded, and the first store was opened in Saint Petersburg. In 2005, Pyaterochka completed an IPO on the London Stock Exchange.

X5 was founded in May 2006 after the merger of the Pyaterochka and Perekrestok retail formats. In 2008, X5 acquired the Karusel hypermarket chain.

Other major acquisitions included: 82 Paterson supermarkets (2009), more than 660 Kopeyka stores (2010), 103 Pokupochka stores in the Samara region (2014), 104 stores owned by the Rosinka Group in Southwest Russia and 100 stores owned by the Soseddushka retail chain in the Orenburg region (2015) and 99 Polushka stores in Bashkortostan (2018), as well as 85 stores Telezhka, Tverskoy kupets and Volny kupets in four regions (2019). In 2018, X5 GDRs started trading on the Moscow Exchange.

== Shareholder structure ==
X5's shareholder structure is as follows: CTF Holdings S.A., 47.86%; Intertrust Trustees Ltd (Axon Trust), 11.43%; X5 directors, 0.10%; treasury shares, 0.01%; shareholders with less than 3%, 40.60%.

=== Dividend policy ===
In 2017, the company approved its dividend policy.

The key principles of the dividend policy are as follows:

1) The dividend policy sets a target payout ratio of at least 25% of X5 Retail Group's consolidated IFRS net profit, provided that the company's financial position allows for it.

2) When considering a dividend proposal to the General Meeting of Shareholders, the Supervisory Board will be guided by a target consolidated net debt/EBITDA ratio of below 2.0x, in line with the company's financing strategy. The ultimate decision on payment of dividends will always be subject to approval of the General Meeting of Shareholders.

2017 dividends amounted to RUB 21.6 bn and 2018 dividends amounted to RUB 25 bn, whereas the planned figure for 2019 is RUB 30 bn.

== Management ==
In 2012, Stephan DuCharme was appointed the Company's CEO and the Chairman of the Management Board.

In 2015, Igor Shekhterman was appointed as the Company's CEO and Stephan DuCharme appointed as the Chairman of Supervisory Board.

== Offline-retail formats ==
Each of the company's brands offers a customer value proposition and targets parts of the Russian consumer population. This strategy enables X5 Retail Group to capture a portion of the growth that is forecast for each of the three largest segments of Russia's food retail market.

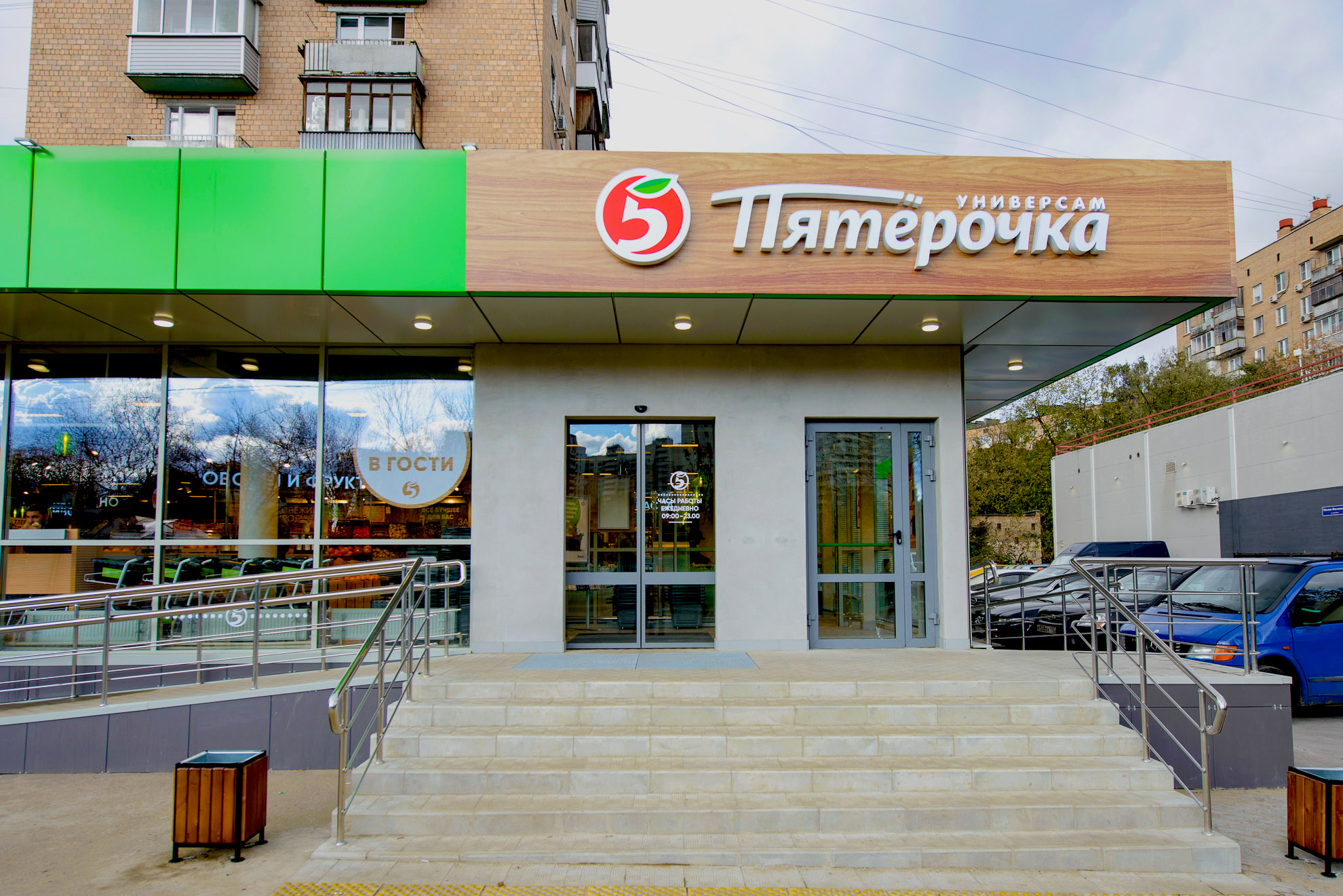
Moscow proximity stores Pyaterochka in the new concept of 2019

=== Pyaterochka ===
Pyaterochka is a retail chain of proximity food stores.

Pyaterochka launched a new store refurbishment program in 2019. The new Pyaterochka will offer almost twice as many fresh products in a selling area of around 150 sq m, which is about half of the sales floor. Vegetables, fruits, and some of the perishable items are laid out in the dedicated fresh zone. The rebranded Pyaterochka sells an assortment of ready-to-eat meals and has an area where customers can have coffee or fresh orange juice and charge their devices. An in-house bakery made it possible to expand the amounts of bread and pastry.

In 2019, the Pyaterochka retail chain consisted of 15,354 stores with a turnover of RUB 1.37 trn.

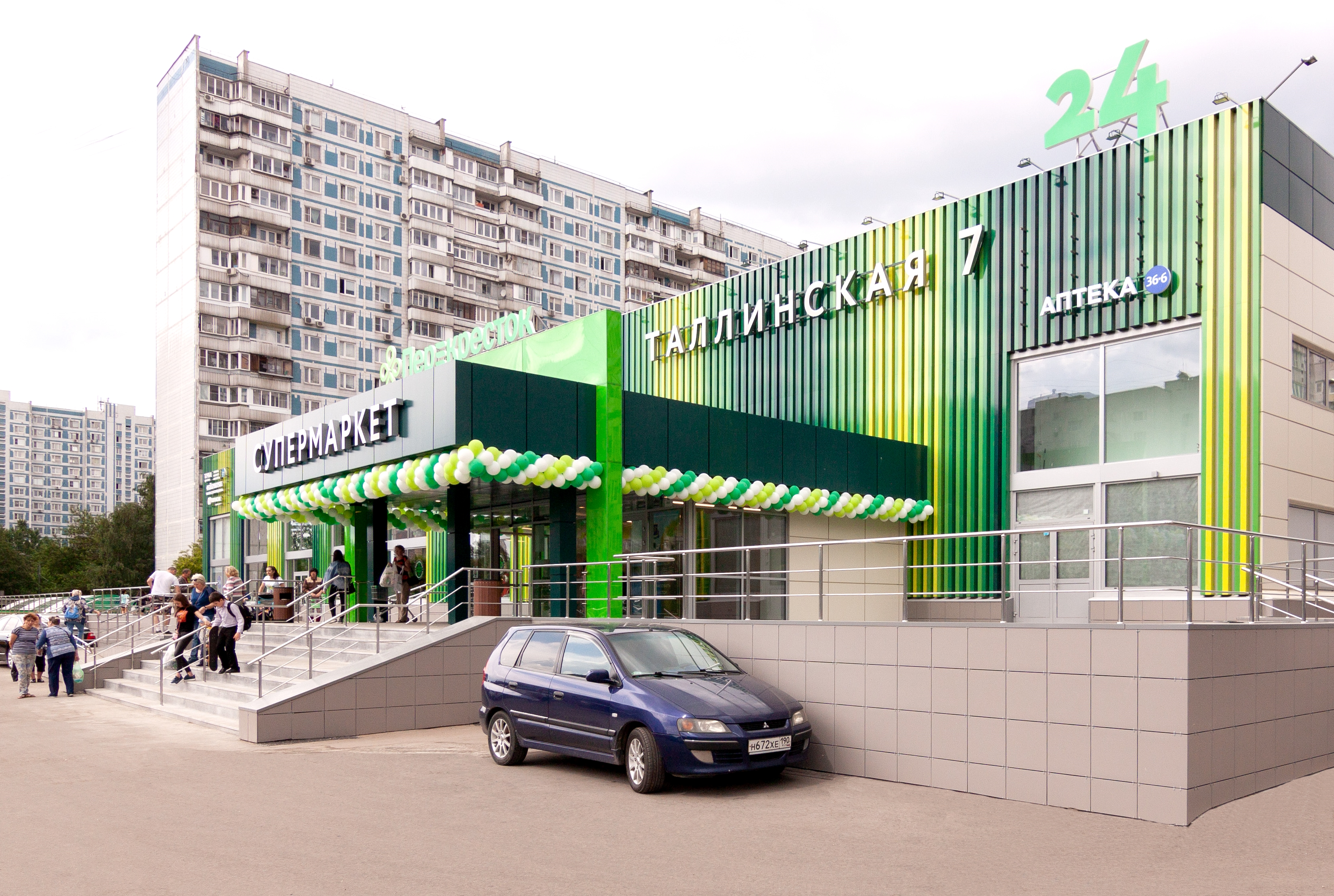
Moscow supermarket Perekrestok in the new concept of 2020

=== Perekrestok ===
Perekrestok is a retail chain of food supermarkets.

In May 2019, Russia's largest smart kitchen was launched for producing semi-prepared foods for stores, allowing a 2.5-fold increase in the ready-to-eat and ready-to-cook range under the Perekrestok Chef brand in the company's supermarkets.

In February 2020, Perekrestok began rolling out a new store concept. Among the highlights of the new concept are updated interior and exterior designs, as well as a selection of new services offered in-store. The new Perekrestok concept includes frequent purchases of ready-to-eat and ready-to-go products. About 50% of the selling space will be dedicated to fresh categories (fruits, vegetables, dairy products,cheese, deli meats, as well as fresh fish and meat) or salad bars, bakeries and cafés. A special area will be focused on the health food category.

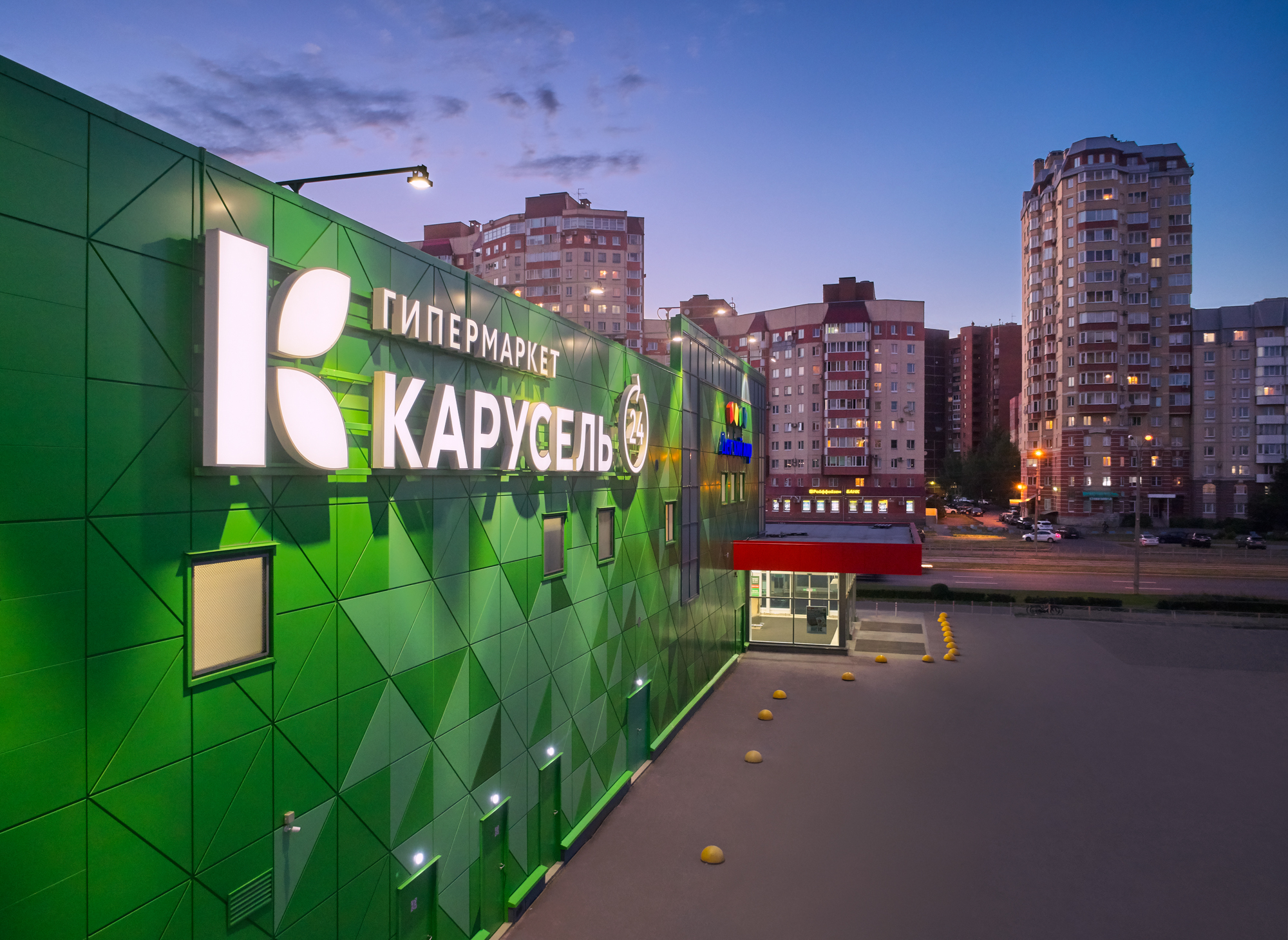
St. Petersburg hypermarket Karusel in the new concept of 2018

Perekrestok is Russia's largest supermarket chain, consisting, at 2019 closing, of 852 supermarkets with a turnover of RUB 273 bn.

=== Karusel ===
Karusel is a retail chain of hypermarkets specializing in food.

In 2019, Х5 Retail Group announced its decision to transform the Karusel hypermarket chain within two years: - 34 stores to become large format supermarkets managed by the Perekrestok retail chain by the beginning of 2021; - 20 stores to close by 2022; - 37 hypermarkets to continue operating under the Karusel brand.

At the end of 2019, the Karusel retail chain had 91 hypermarkets with a turnover of RUB 87 bn.

=== Chizhik ===
In October 2020, X5 Group launched a new hard discounter "Chizhik" in Moscow and in Balashikha with expectations of its federal expansion. A year after, 27 Chizhik hard discounters were opened in Moscow and in Moscow Oblast with 70 expected, in regions as well, by the end of the year 2021. In 2022, X5 Group announced 3000 Chizhik stores would be opened in 3 years.

== Online retail and services ==
In addition to the retail chains, X5 Retail Group manages the Perekrestok.ru online supermarket and the Dostavka.Pyaterochka and Perekrestok.Bystro food and 5Post parcel delivery services.

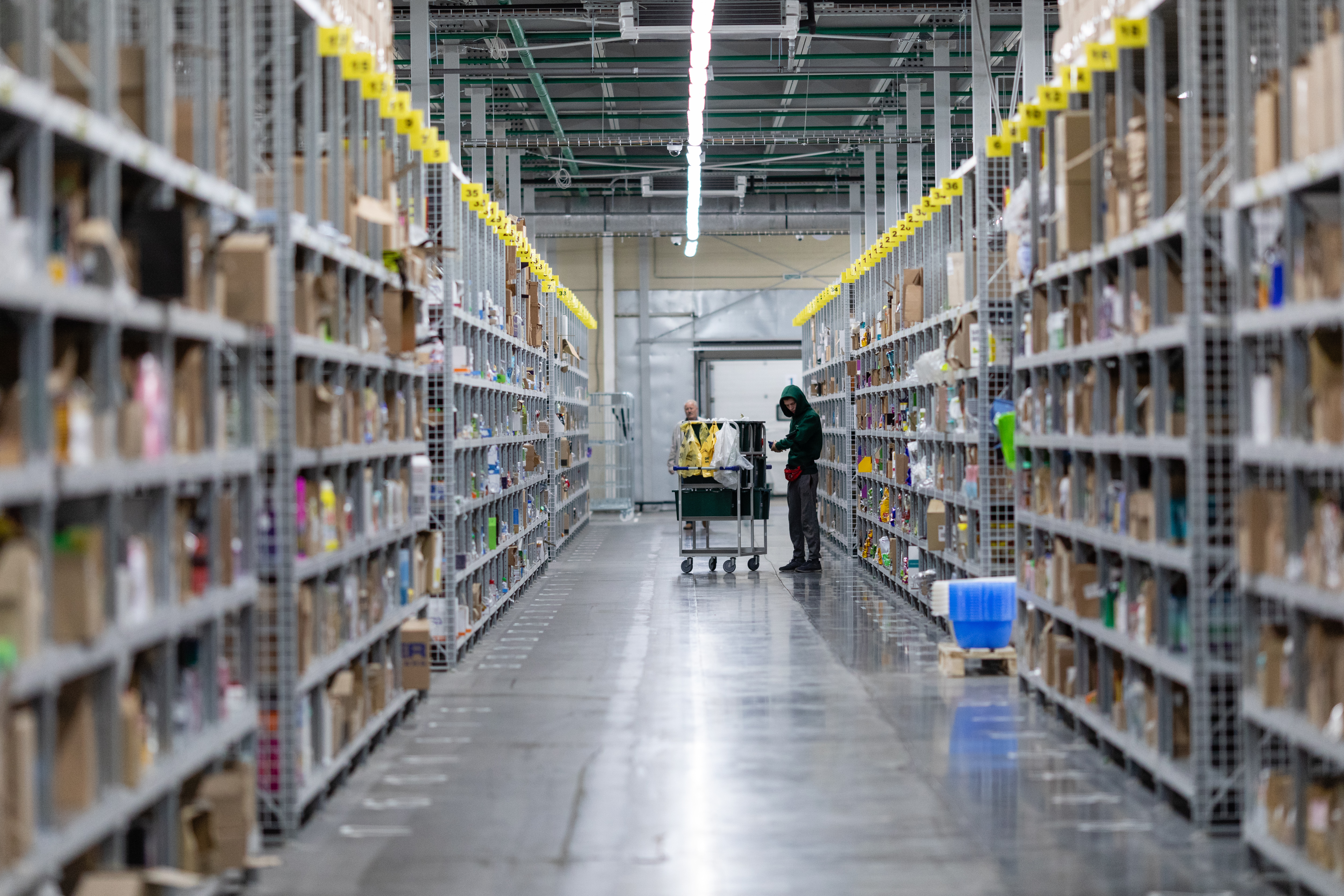
Moscow's dark-store of Perekrestok.ru online supermarket

=== Perekrestok.ru ===
In 2017, the Perekrestok.ru online store was introduced in Moscow and, in October 2018, in St Petersburg.

A dark store combines features of a traditional store and a warehouse: it is not intended for making purchases, but the merchandising display is similar to that of a store. In contrast to a traditional warehouse, a dark store services online orders, and goods are displayed individually.

Perekrestok.ru online supermarket results
Parameter / Year	2018	2019
Net revenues, Russian Rouble, million	▲1 290	▲4 310
Number of orders, thousand	▲408	▲1 367
Average bill, Russian Rouble	▲3 526	▲3 584

As of 31 December 2019, the online supermarket had two dark stores in Moscow and one dark store in St Petersburg.

=== Food delivery services ===
The Dostavka.Pyaterochka express delivery service was launched in 2019; orders are collected at Pyaterochka stores. For the project, the company developed its own software covering all the project's operational and auxiliary processes. The IT system is integrated into the Х5 Retail Group infrastructure, allowing new stores to be connected to the service in just a few hours and goods balances to be monitored virtually in real-time. There is a patented system in operation for collecting orders at a store, which cuts assembly time considerably and optimizes staff work. As of April 2020, the service was live in Moscow, Skhodnya, Lyubertsy and Kazan.

The Perekrestok.Bystro express delivery service was started up in 2020, with orders being collected at Perekrestok supermarkets. The software is similar to the IT system used by the Dostavka.Pyaterochka service. As of April 2020, the service was operating in Moscow.

=== 5Post ===
5Post is a subdivision of X5 Retail Group, a developing service for delivering orders from online stores and marketplaces to the company's stores. In the summer of 2018, the subdivision started opening the first lockers and order collection points.

In June 2019, X5 Retail Group and the Unitrade customs broker developed an end-to-end service for foreign online stores. Partners pick up orders from the online store warehouses in China, bring them to Russia, clear them through customs, and deliver them to the X5 distribution centre in Novosibirsk. Then 5Post delivers the parcels to stores.

At the end of 2019, 5Post was managing 12 sorting facilities at Х5 Retail Group distribution centres and 8,000 postamats and order collection points. During 2019, over five million parcels were delivered to clients.

== Activities ==
=== Market position ===
The company's market share by revenues at the close of 2019 was 11.5%. The closest competitor was Magnit, with a food retail market share of 7.6% (together with non-food and non-retail business – 9.6%).

View source data.

Share of the food retail market
The company / Year	2013	2014	2015	2016	2017	2018	2019
X5 Retail Group	5,5 %	▲5,9 %	▲6,3 %	▲8,0 %	▲9,5 %	▲10,7 %	▲11,5 %
Magnit	5,8 %	▲6,9 %	▼6,8 %	▲7,4 %	▲7,5 %	▲7,7 %	▼7,6 %
DKBR	1,8 %	▲2,1 %	▲2,9 %	▲3,6 %	▲3,9 %	▲5,1 %	▲5,7 %
Lenta	1,5 %	▲1,8 %	1,8 %	▲2,1 %	▲2,5 %	▲2,8 %	▼2,5 %
Auchan	3,9 %	▼3,1 %	▼2,8 %	▲2,9 %	▼2,2 %	▼1,9 %	▼1,5 %
1. Magnit's revenues include those from food formats only
2. In 2013–2014, only the share of Dixy Group was calculated; in 2015–2017—the aggregate of Dixy Group and Krasnoe & Beloe, not including the Bristol alcoholic beverages markets; in 2018–2019—DKBR (in January 2019, Dixy Group merged with the Bristol alcoholic beverages markets and Krasnoe & Beloe chains)

=== Operational and financial results ===
As of 31 December 2019, the company operated 16,297 stores, including 15,354 Pyaterochka proximity stores, 852 Perekrestok supermarkets, and 91 Karusel hypermarkets, the Perekrestok.ru online supermarket (two dark stores in Moscow and one dark store in St Petersburg), and the 5Post delivery service for online store and marketplace orders (8,000 postamats and order collection points).

Key financial indicators
Parameter / Year	2013	2014	2015	2016	2017	2018	2019
Revenue, Russian Rouble, million	▲534 560	▲633 873	▲808 818	▲1 033 667	▲1 295 008	▲1 532 537	▲1 734 347
Gross profit, Russian Rouble, million	▲130 348	▲154 982	▲198 390	▲249 985	▲308 938	▲369 720	▲425 798
Gross profit margin, %	▲24,4	▲24,5	24,5	▼24,2	▼23,9	▲24,1	▲24,6
EBITDA, Russian Rouble, million	▲38 350	▲45 860	▲55 233	▲76 267	▲96 193	▲107 628	▲122 585
EBITDA margin, %	▲7,2	7,2	▼6,8	▲7,4	7,4	▼7,0	▲7,1
Operating profit, Russian Rouble, million	▲25 296	▲28 288	▲34 449	▲45 631	▲57 758	▲58 154	▲60 251
Operating profit margin, %	▲4,7	▼4,5	▼4,3	▲4,4	▲4,5	▼3,8	▼3,5
Net profit, Russian Rouble, million	▲10 984	▲12 691	▲14 174	▲22 291	▲31 394	▼28 642	▼25 908
Net profit margin, %	▲2,1	▼2,0	▼1,8	▲2,2	▲2,4	▼1,9	▼1,5

Liquidity update
Parameter / Year	2013	2014	2015	2016	2017	2018	2019
Total debt, Russian Rouble, million, incl.:	▼110 523	▲130 986	▲144 215	▲156 033	▲194 296	▲207 764	▲227 933
Short-term debt, Russian Rouble, million	▼30 680	▼15 834	▲42 670	▲45 168	▲58 674	▲60 435	▲74 755
Long-term debt, Russian Rouble, million	▲79 843	▲115 152	▼101 545	▲110 865	▲135 622	▲147 329	▲153 178
Net debt, Russian Rouble, million	102 912	▲105 363	▲135 257	▲137 843	▲166 691	▲183 396	▲209 331
Net debt/EBITDA	2,68х	▼2,30х	▲2,45х	▼1,81х	▼1,73х	▼1,70х	▲1,71х

Number of stores (As of 31 December)
Brand / Year	2008	2009	2010	2011	2012	2013	2014	2015	2016	2017	2018	2019
Pyaterochka	848	▲1 039	▲1 392	▲2 525	▲3 220	▲3 882	▲4 789	▲6 265	▲8 363	▲11 225	▲13 522	▲15 354
Kopeyka	-	-	660	-	-	-	-	-	-	-	-	-
Perekrestok	207	▲275	▲301	▲330	▲370	▲390	▲403	▲478	▲539	▲638	▲760	▲852
Karusel	46	▲58	▲71	▲77	▲78	▲83	▼82	▲90	▲91	▲93	▲94	▼91
Convenience store Express	-	-	45	▲70	▲134	▲189	▲209	▼187	▲194	▼165	▼55	-

=== Partnership projects ===
In 2013, X5 Retail Group kicked off a programme to attract sublessees, and by the end of 2017, over 29,000 retail outlets were opened in X5 stores by 5,500 private enterprises. With 5,000 sublessees, Pyaterochka leads the way in the number of partners accounting for over 8% of its total selling space. More than 3,000 of them are farmers and small and medium-sized enterprises selling food and children's goods, as well as providing everyday services, near the cash desks outside Pyaterochka's shopping area or inside as a shop-in-shop.

In April 2017, X5 Retail Group launched a cooperation project with the Central Union of Consumer Societies of the Russian Federation (Centrosoyuz). The COOP-Pyaterochka format has the potential to add up to 1,000 stores over a three-year period. The parties have also agreed to open up to 5,000 Pyaterocka-based shop-in-shop corners by 2021 to sell farmers' and consumer cooperatives' products.

In November 2021, X5 Group and Alfa-Bank launched a joint financial service "X5 Bank", 49,99% each held by the retailer and by the bank, with 0,02% owned by "Alfa Investments". X5 Bank is part of X5 Group's strategy to be represented at every step of the customer journey, from product to purchase.

== IT and innovations ==
Х5 entered the innovation market in 2017: by July 2019, Х5 innovations had attracted over 800 start-ups. Four hundred solutions underwent thorough assessment by business experts, and some of them progressed to the business modelling phase. More than 100 start-ups advanced to the prototype/pilot phase, and 14 projects were implemented. Х5 considers technological solutions for four key retail spheres: customer experience, operations in stores, supply chain, and back office. Х5 is focusing particularly on smart shelving projects, flexible pricing systems, robotisation, automation of quality and freshness control for foodstuffs, and goods tracking.

Developing innovation

In June 2017, X5 Retail Group and the Internet Initiatives Development Fund (IIDF) launched a specialised retail accelerator, with the Petrovich and Sportmaster chains among its partners. Start-up companies joining the IIDF accelerator programme are able not only to attract from RUB 2 mn to RUB 25 mn of investments from the fund, but also to get advice from X5 experts and test their business ideas on X5's anonymised database of over 3 bn purchases.

In May 2018, X5 and Innopolis University launched a joint initiative on scientific research projects, with a focus on a pilot store for the future project. In March 2019, X5 became a resident of the Innopolis Special Economic Zone and opened an X5 Development Centre.

In October 2018, Х5 Retail Group opened a laboratory store at a Pyaterochka proximity store for testing the possibility of introducing new technologies. At the store, technologies for ESL, video analysis, smart shelves, digital information panels, self-scanning and payment scenarios, and other smart store technologies are all being tested under "field conditions". In November 2019, a second laboratory store was opened at a Perekrestok supermarket.

In June 2019, X5 Retail Group, together with the Israel-Russia Chamber of Commerce (IRCC), launched the X5 Retail-Tech Challenge start-up competition. In July 2019, X5 started selecting start-ups from Estonia, Latvia and Lithuania. In October 2019, X5 Retail Group summed up the results of a competition of start-ups held jointly with the Spanish Institute for Foreign Trade (ICEX).

In July 2019, the Sberbank venture fund, Fort Ross Ventures and X5 Retail Group signed an agreement on strategic partnership in innovation, exchange of technologies and looking for start-ups. In December that year, X5 Retail Group and start-up accelerator Orange Fab started a joint programme for seeking and introducing innovations in Russia.

IT infrastructure

In April 2019, X5 launched a digital parcel delivery platform. The solution utilized information systems to integrate postamats, sorting facilities, and warehouse equipment. For deliveries within Russia, online stores and marketplaces deliver to the X5 distribution centres, while the retailer picks up cross-border deliveries at the Customs. The platform has a capacity of up to one million dispatches a day.

Sales

In November 2017, X5 introduced machine learning to bolster targeted marketing at the Perekrestok supermarket chain, and developed personalised offers for all members of the Perekrestok Club loyalty program.

In December 2017, Mail.Ru Group and X5 launched a partnership in online advertising targeting and assessing its impact on offline sales in certain stores. MyTarget platform clients gain access to X5's anonymised data on consumer behaviour with a view to enhancing the accuracy of ad targeting and linking ad impression data with sales performance at the Pyaterochka, Perekrestok, and Karusel chains.

In June 2018, X5 started implementing video analytics and computer vision technology based on neural networks and artificial intelligence. It speeds up control of store layouts and the number of products on shelves by a factor of ten, and reduces the number of people leaving the store without a purchase and shrinkage levels by 10% and 20%, respectively.

In May 2018, X5 completed a large-scale project to automate the processes of demand and replenishment planning at both stores and at Perekrestok and Karusel distribution centres. To this end, the company redesigned its core logistics, marketing, and sales processes, and introduced an end-to-end system of supply chain management, boosting forecast accuracy by 17% and increasing on-shelf availability of products by 5%. The Company also reduced inventory levels by 13%.

In May 2018, X5 introduced automated detailed planogramming for hypermarkets. It factors in store equipment characteristics, customer preferences, historical data on inventory turnover by product type, assortment by category, packaging size and type, etc. After three months of its use, the system boosted sales by up to 10.5% in some categories.

In the summer of 2019, X5 Retail Group started producing self-service cash registers. The company developed the device and the software itself: the machines are equipped with a multi-touch screen, 2D barcode scanner, stereo speakers, a microphone for audio apps and voice services, and a 3D camera. At the second stage, X5 added a goods weighing platform and there are plans for a rapid payment system using QR codes and Face ID technology.

Real estate transactions

In February 2018, X5 launched an online service that helps real estate owners calculate the average rent at any location where Pyaterochka has a presence. The service also enables landlords to offer premises or a property for lease or sale instantly, if the property meets all the criteria for store opening, or offer a land plot for building a store.

== Logistics ==
X5 began implementing its logistics separation strategy in 2013, splitting product flows for convenience stores on one hand and supermarkets and hypermarkets on the other.

As of 31 December 2019, X5 Retail Group operated 42 distribution centres spanning 1.2 million sq m, including 31 centres catering to Pyaterochka and 11 centres serving the super- and hypermarket formats (Perekrestok and Karusel).

As of 31 December 2019, X5’s fleet comprises 4,124 owned trucks.
