= Perekrestok (supermarket chain) =

Russian supermarket chain

Перекрёсток
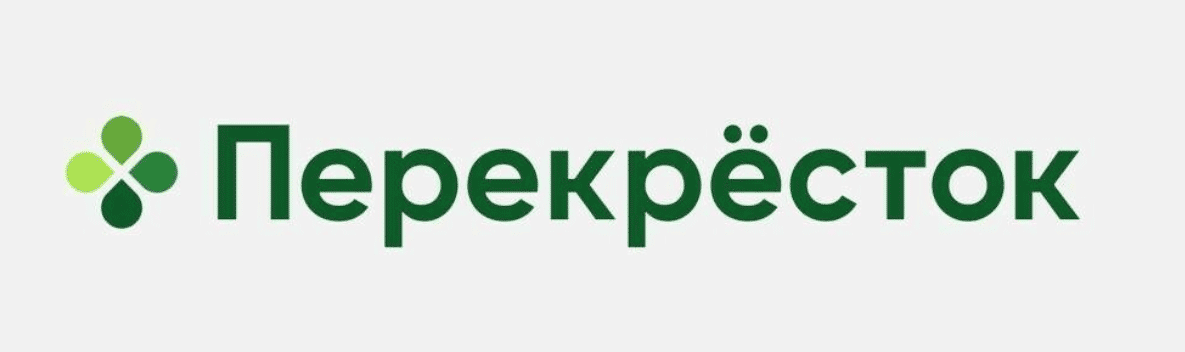
- Native name: Перекрёсток
- Romanized name: Perekrestok
- Industry: Retail
- Founded: 1994; 32 years ago in Moscow, Russia
- Revenue: 230,800,000,000 Russian ruble (2018)
- Number of employees: 30,400
- Website: perekrestok.ru

Perekrestok (Russian: Перекрёсток, romanized: Perekryostok, translates as "crossroad" in English) is Russia’s largest supermarket chain managed by X5 Retail Group.

In August 2019, the chain opened its 800th store.

== History ==
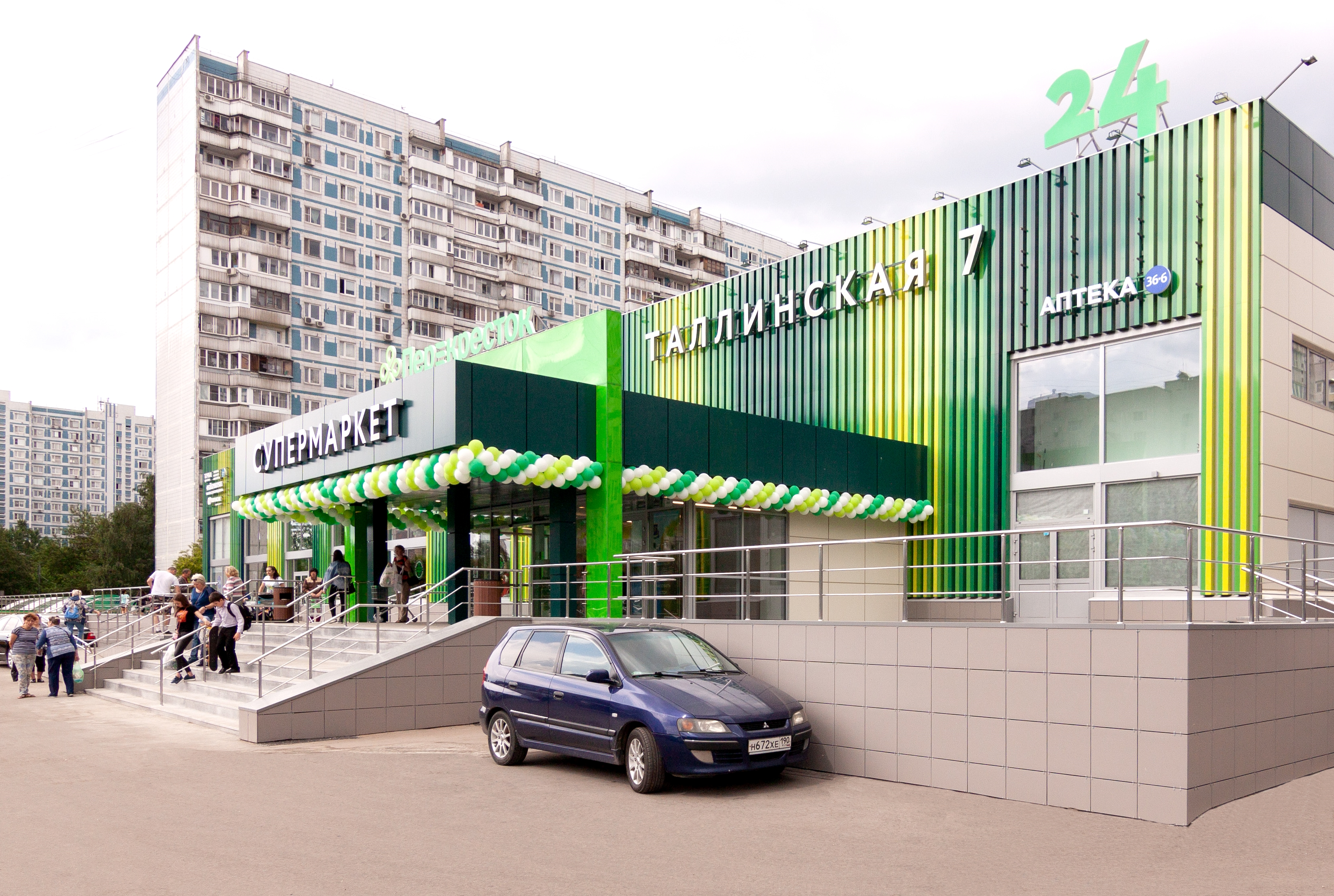
Moscow supermarket Perekrestok in the new concept of 2020

The chain was founded in 1994, when the first supermarket opened in Moscow.

In 2002, Perekrestok started expanding into other Russian regions.

In 2006, Perekrestok and Pyaterochka merged, creating X5 Retail Group while keeping the Perekrestok brand unchanged.

In 2014, the chain adopted a new store concept, with state-of-the-art retail equipment, better use of selling space, and improved interior and exterior design.

In February 2020, Perekrestok had begun the roll-out of new store concept. Among the highlights of the new concept were an updated interior and exterior designs, and a selection of new services offered in-store. The new Perekrestok concept was designed to meet the needs of today's customers, including frequent purchases of ready-to-eat and ready-to-go products. About 50% of the selling space was dedicated to fresh categories (fruits, vegetables, dairy products, cheese, deli meats, as well as fresh fish and meat) or salad bars, bakeries, and cafés. A special area was focused on the health foods category.

== Key metrics ==
As of 31 December 2019, Perekrestok managed a total of 852 stores that generated revenue of RUB 273 bn.

Key operating metrics of Perekrestok (as at 31 December)
Parameter / Year	2010	2011	2012	2013	2014	2015	2016	2017	2018	2019
Number of stores	▲301	▲330	▲370	▲390	▲403	▲478	▲539	▲638	▲760	▲852
Selling space, '000 sq m	▲313	▲347.3	▲383.5	▲397.8	▲415.8	▲484	▲548.5	▲637.2	▲781.5	▲900
Net retail revenue, RUB bn	▲83.1	▲99.8	▲105.5	▲110.7	▲115.6	▲130.1	▲155.4	▲186.9	▲230.8	▲273
Customer visits, m	▲263	▲291	▲297	▲307	▼302	▲304	▲305	▲407	▲505	▲589

== Pilot projects ==
In 2008, the first premium class supermarket Green Perekrestok opened in Rostov-on-Don. In March 2009, the first Green Perekrestok was launched in Moscow. Some elements of the Green Perekrestok concept were later incorporated into a modernisation programme that spanned the entire Perekrestok chain.

== IT and innovations ==
In July 2017, Perekrestok launched Smart Wi-Fi, a project to create a free Wi-Fi network in 250 Perekrestok supermarkets in Moscow. The initiative enables the company to show ads and send push notifications to customers immediately after they get connected.

In November 2017, X5 introduced machine learning to bolster targeted marketing at the Perekrestok supermarket chain, and developed personalised offers for all members of the Perekrestok Club loyalty program. The company leverages machine learning to group customers into segments based on common features and create offers for them. The system analyses groups of customers and designs personalised marketing campaigns based on demographic and several hundred behavioural factors, such as: frequency of purchases and ticket size, customer preferences, lifestyle fundamentals, acceptable price levels, favourite product categories and preferred shopping hours. Customer sensitivity to offers is predicted using various analytical models. In addition, the system picks out the most efficient communication channels for a target audience and automatically generates marketing messages.

In May 2018, X5 successfully completed a large-scale project to automate the processes of demand and replenishment planning at both stores and at Perekrestok and Karusel distribution centres. To this end, the Company redesigned its core logistics, marketing and sales processes, and introduced an end-to-end system of supply chain management, boosting forecast accuracy by 17% and increasing on-shelf availability of products by 5%. The Company also reduced inventory levels by 13%.

In November 2019, X5 Retail Group has opened a ‘lab store’ based on Perekrestok in Moscow, to test new technologies that will enhance customer experiencе. Engineers in the lab is conduct in-store trials of electronic shelf labelling, video analytics, smart shelves, digital information panels, and self-scanning and self-checkout systems. If a technology works out in the lab, it will move on for pilot testing in Pyaterochka, Perekrestok and Karusel stores, where X5 experts will also assess the viability and impact of these technologies on sales and costs. Based on the results of the pilot stage, a final decision is made on the implementation of the new technology in X5 stores.

== Logistics ==
In 1998, Perekrestok was the first Russian retail chain to open a modern distribution centre in Paveltsevo, near the Sheremetyevo Airport.

As of 31 December 2019, 11 out of 39 distribution centres of X5 Retail Group serve the large formats of Perekrestok and Karusel.

== Management ==
- 1995-2006 — Alexander Kosyanenko
- 2006 (April-December) — Sergey Semenov
- 2007 — Dariusz Bator
- 2007-2008 — Alexey Tikhomirov
- May 2008 - July 2009 — Jaco Boulin
- July 2009 - April 2010 — Mikhail Susov
- April 2010 - September 2011 — Ekaterina Stolypina
- September 2011 - August 2012 — Igor Sotnikov
- August 2012 - September 2013 — Valery Tarakanov
- September 2013 - October 2014 — Janusz Lella
- October 2014 - July 2018 — Vladimir Sorokin
- July 2018 - January 2022 — Vladislav Kurbatov
- 2022 (January-August) — Vladimir Sadovin
- August 2022 - recent — Andrey Kalmykov

== Awards ==
2021: Perekrestok received awards in 5 nominations at the annual international Red Apple Award. According to the results of the voting, the retail chain received a bronze award for the project #Rebirth (#ПЕРЕрождение), as well as 2 silver and 2 bronze statuettes for the advertising campaign "Grocery Garden" together with the project "HELP". The Grocery Garden (Продуктовый Сад) was awarded silver awards in the following nominations "Influence and Сontent marketing" and "Best in Instagram". Бронзовые награды проект получил в номинациях "Non-profit" and "Influencer and Content marketing".

2022: The Perekrestok retail chain has won five awards at the annual Customer Experience World Awards 2022 (a professional competition in the customer experience industry).
