= Administrative divisions of Moscow Oblast =

Moscow Oblast Russia
- Administrative center: None

Administrative structure (as of 2014)
- Administrative districts: 38
- Cities/towns: 79
- Urban‑type settlements: 70
- n/a
- Rural localities: 6,122
- Closed localities: 5

Municipal structure (as of 2009)
- Municipal districts: 36
- Urban okrugs: 36
- Urban settlements: 114
- Rural settlements: 192

This is a list of the administrative and municipal divisions of Moscow Oblast, a federal subject of Russia.

Moscow Oblast is located in the Central Federal District of Russia, and surrounds Moscow, the capital of Russia. While Moscow hosts the majority of the government bodies of the oblast, it does not officially serve as the oblast's administrative center and is not otherwise associated with the oblast either administratively or municipally.

The oblast is, like other Russian federal subjects, subdivided for the purposes of the state administration and for the purposes of the local self-government, the rights to which are guaranteed by the Constitution of Russia. While the administrative and municipal divisions are not required by law to be identical, the system of municipal divisions in Moscow Oblast, having been created on the basis of existing administrative divisions, has only minor differences from the system of administrative divisions.

== History ==
The oblast was established within the Russian Soviet Federative Socialist Republic on January 14, 1929, as Central Industrial Oblast (Центральнопромышленная область) from abolished Moscow, Ryazan, Tula, and Tver Governorates, as well as from parts of Kaluga and Vladimir Governorates. On June 3, 1929, the oblast was given its present name.

In September 1937, the oblast was split into Moscow, Ryazan, and Tula Oblasts, thus establishing itself in its present borders.

A part of Moscow Oblast's territory, including the towns of Troitsk, Shcherbinka, and Moskovsky, urban-type settlements of Kokoshkino and Kiyevsky, as well as parts of territories of Leninsky, Naro-Fominsky, and Podolsky Districts, was transferred to the federal city of Moscow on July 1, 2012.

== Administrative division structure ==
In terms of administrative division, the Oblast is divided into:

- cities/towns under the Oblast administration;
- urban-type settlements under the Oblast administration;
- closed administrative-territorial formations.

== Municipal divisions structure ==
In terms of the local self-government, the Oblast is divided into:

- urban okrugs.

== List of administrative and municipal divisions ==

Moscow Oblast administrative districts before July 1, 2012

Administrative center	Cities/towns and urban-type settlements under the administrative districts jurisdiction	Notes
Cities/towns under the Oblast jurisdiction / Urban okrugs
Balashikha		
Bronnitsy		
Chekhov	Stolbovaya	
Chernogolovka		
Dmitrov	Yakhroma; Dedenyovo; Iksha; Nekrasovsky	
Dolgoprudny		
Domodedovo		
Dubna		
Dzerzhinsky		
Elektrogorsk		
Elektrostal		
Fryazino		
Istra	Dedovsk; Snegiri	
Ivanteyevka		
Kashira		
Khimki		
Klin	Vysokovsk; Reshetnikovo	
Kolomna	Peski	
Korolyov		
Kotelniki		
Krasnoarmeysk		
Krasnogorsk	Nakhabino	
Lobnya		
Losino-Petrovsky		
Lukhovitsy	Beloomut	
Lytkarino		
Lyubertsy	Kraskovo; Malakhovka; Oktyabrsky; Tomilino	
Mozhaysk	Uvarovka	
Mytishchi		
Naro-Fominsk	Aprelevka; Vereya; Kalininets; Selyatino	
Noginsk	Elektrougli; Staraya Kupavna imeni Vorovskogo; Obukhovo	
Odintsovo	Golitsyno; Kubinka; Bolshiye Vyazyomy; Lesnoy Gorodok; Novoivanovskoye; Zarechye; Zvenigorod	
Orekhovo-Zuyevo	Drezna; Kurovskoye; Likino-Dulyovo	
Ozyory		
Pavlovsky Posad	Bolshiye Dvory	
Podolsk		
Protvino		
Pushchino		
Pushkino	Ashukino; Cherkizovo; Lesnoy; Pravdinsky; Sofrino; Zelenogradsky	
Ramenskoye	Bykovo; Ilyinsky; Kratovo; Rodniki; Udelnaya	
Reutov		
Roshal		
Ruza	Tuchkovo	
Shatura	Cherusti; Misheronsky	
Shchyolkovo	Fryanovo; Monino; Sverdlovsky; Zagoryansky	
Sergiyev Posad	Khotkovo; Krasnozavodsk; Peresvet; Bogorodskoye; Skoropuskovsky	
Serpukhov	Obolensk; Proletarsky	
Solnechnogorsk	Andreyevka; Mendeleyevo; Povarovo; Rzhavki	
Stupino	Malino; Mikhnevo; Zhilyovo	
Taldom	Severny; Verbilki; Zaprudnya	
Vidnoye	Gorki Leninskiye	
Volokolamsk	Sychyovo	
Voskresensk	Beloozyorsky; Fosforitny imeni Tsyurupy; Khorlovo	
Yegoryevsk	Ryazanovsky	
Zaraysk		
Zhukovsky		
Urban-type settlements under the Oblast jurisdiction / Urban okrugs
Lotoshino		
Serebryanye Prudy		
Shakhovskaya		
Closed administrative-territorial formations / Urban okrugs
Krasnoznamensk		
Molodyozhny		
Vlasikha		
Voskhod		
Zvyozdny gorodok		

== Differences in municipal and administrative divisions ==
In terms of administrative division,

- Krasnoznamensk, Molodyozhny, and Voskhod Urban Okrugs correspond to closed administrative-territorial formations.
- The closed administrative-territorial formations of Vlasikha and Zvyozdny gorodok have not yet been municipally incorporated as urban okrugs (as of January 2009).
- All other urban okrugs correspond to the cities/towns under the oblast jurisdiction.

== See also ==
- Administrative divisions of Moscow
