= Pravdinsky =

Pravdinsky (masculine), Pravdinskaya (feminine), or Pravdinskoye (neuter) may refer to:

- Pravdinsky District, a district of Kaliningrad Oblast, Russia
- Pravdinsky Urban Okrug, a municipal formation into which Pravdinsky District in Kaliningrad Oblast, Russia is incorporated
- Pravdinsky Urban Settlement, a municipal formation into which the Work Settlement of Pravdinsky in Pushkinsky District of Moscow Oblast, Russia is incorporated
- Pravdinskoye Urban Settlement, a former municipal formation into which the town of district significance of Pravdinsk in Pravdinsky District of Kaliningrad Oblast, Russia was incorporated
- Pravdinsky (urban-type settlement), an urban-type settlement in Moscow Oblast, Russia
