= Imeni Vorovskogo =

Imeni Vorovskogo may refer to:

- Imeni Vorovskogo, Azerbaijan, a village in Azerbaijan
- Imeni Vorovskogo, Russia, name of several inhabited localities in Russia
