= Udelny (inhabited locality) =

Udelny (Russian: Удельный; masculine), Udelnaya (Удельная; feminine), or Udelnoye (Удельное; neuter) is the name of several inhabited localities in Russia.

Urban localities

- Udelnaya, Moscow Oblast, a suburban (dacha) settlement in Ramensky District of Moscow Oblast

Rural localities

- Udelnoye, Kirov Oblast, a village in Shvarikhinsky Rural Okrug of Nolinsky District of Kirov Oblast
- Udelnoye, Alexeyevsky Rural Okrug, Sovetsky District, Mari El Republic, a village in Alexeyevsky Rural Okrug of Sovetsky District of the Mari El Republic
- Udelnoye, Vyatsky Rural Okrug, Sovetsky District, Mari El Republic, a village in Vyatsky Rural Okrug of Sovetsky District of the Mari El Republic
- Udelnaya, Mari El Republic, a village in Gornoshumetsky Rural Okrug of Yurinsky District of the Mari El Republic
