= Pravdinsk (disambiguation) =

Pravdinsk may refer to a number of places, likely named directly or indirectly after the Pravda newspaper:

- Pravdinsk, formerly Friedland in Ostpreußen, a town in Kaliningrad Oblast, Russia
- Pravdinsk, Balakhna, formerly an urban-type settlement; now a part of the town of Balakhna in Nizhny Novgorod Oblast, Russia
- Pravdinsk (air base), now Istomino Airfield, located near Balakhna

== See also ==
- Pravdinsky (disambiguation)
