= Nikolai Babanakov =

Nikolai Babankov
- Born: 19 December 1919; Bobonakovo, Tomsk Governorate, (now Belovo, Kemerovo Oblast)
- Died: 21 June 1951 (aged 31); Bakovka, Moscow Oblast, Soviet Union
- Military career
- Allegiance: Soviet Union
- Branch: Engineering Forces
- Service years: 1939–1945
- Rank: Sergeant
- Conflicts: Second World War
- Awards: Hero of the Soviet Union

Nikolai Petrovich Babankov (Russian: Николай Петрович Бабанаков; 19 December 1919 — 21 June 1951) was a sergeant of the Workers 'and Peasants' Red Army, participant in the Second World War, a Hero of the Soviet Union (1945).

== Biography ==
Nikolai Babanakov was born in 1919 in the village of Bobonakovo (now the city of Belovo, Kemerovo Oblast) into a working-class family. In 1934 he graduated from high school, worked as a timber carrier at the mine. In 1939, Babanakov was called up to serve in the Workers 'and Peasants' Red Army. Since November 1941 - on the fronts of the Great Patriotic War. By April 1945, Sergeant Nikolai Babanakov commanded a detachment of the 87th separate motorized pontoon-bridge battalion of the 8th motorized pontoon-bridge brigade of the 65th Army of the 2nd Belorussian Front. He distinguished himself during the crossing of the Oder.

On 21 April 1945, Babanakov's department assembled a ferry and began transporting Soviet military equipment across the West Oder south of the city of Stettin (now Szczecin, Poland), despite enemy fire. When one of the enemy shells hit the ferry, which created a threat of flooding, Babanakov managed to quickly repair the hole. By 22 April, 90 guns with ammunition and 15 tanks were transported across the river.

By decree of the Presidium of the Supreme Soviet of the Soviet Union of 29 June 1945, Sergeant Nikolai Babanakov was awarded the title of Hero of the Soviet Union with the Order of Lenin and the Gold Star medal.

After the end of the war, Babanakov was demobilized, graduated from a meat and dairy technical school in the city of Vyborg, Leningrad Oblast. He worked as the director of an oil refinery in the village of Uvarovka, Mozhaysky District, Moscow Oblast. He died on 21 June 1951 and was buried at the Peredelkino Cemetery.

He was also awarded the Orders of the Red Star and of Glory of the 3rd degree, as well as a number of medals.

== Literature ==
- Heroes of the Soviet Union: A Brief Biographical Dictionary / Prev. ed. Collegium I. N. Shkadov. - M .: Military Publishing, 1987. - T. 1 / Abaev - Lyubichev /. — 911 p. — 100,000 copies. — ISBN ots., Reg. No. in RCP 87–95382.
- In flame and glory Essays on the history of the Siberian military district. - 1. - Novosibirsk: West Siberian Book Publishing House, 1969. - S. 398.
