= Kolomensky District =

Kolomensky District Коломенский район (Russian)
- District
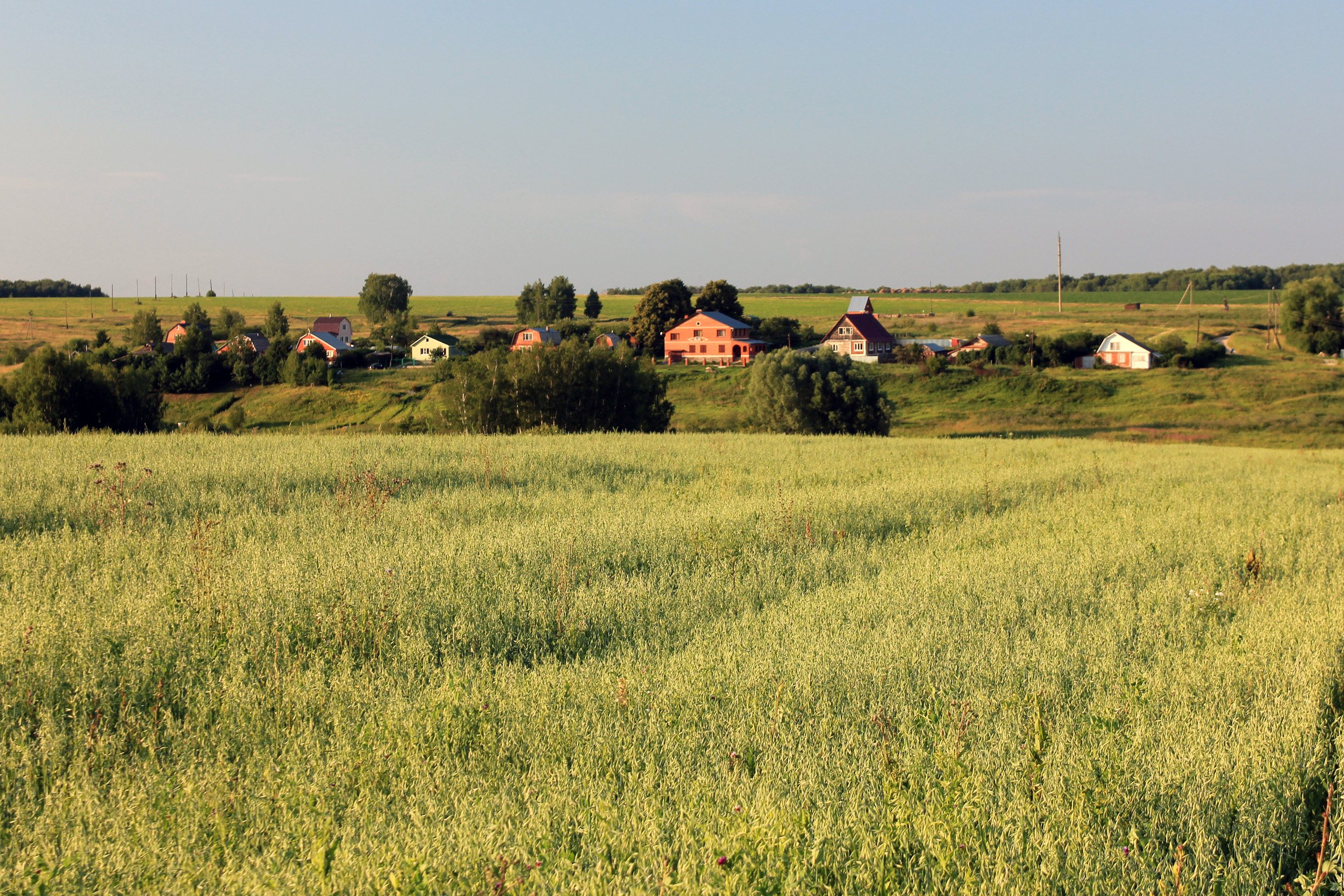
- Village in Kolomensky District

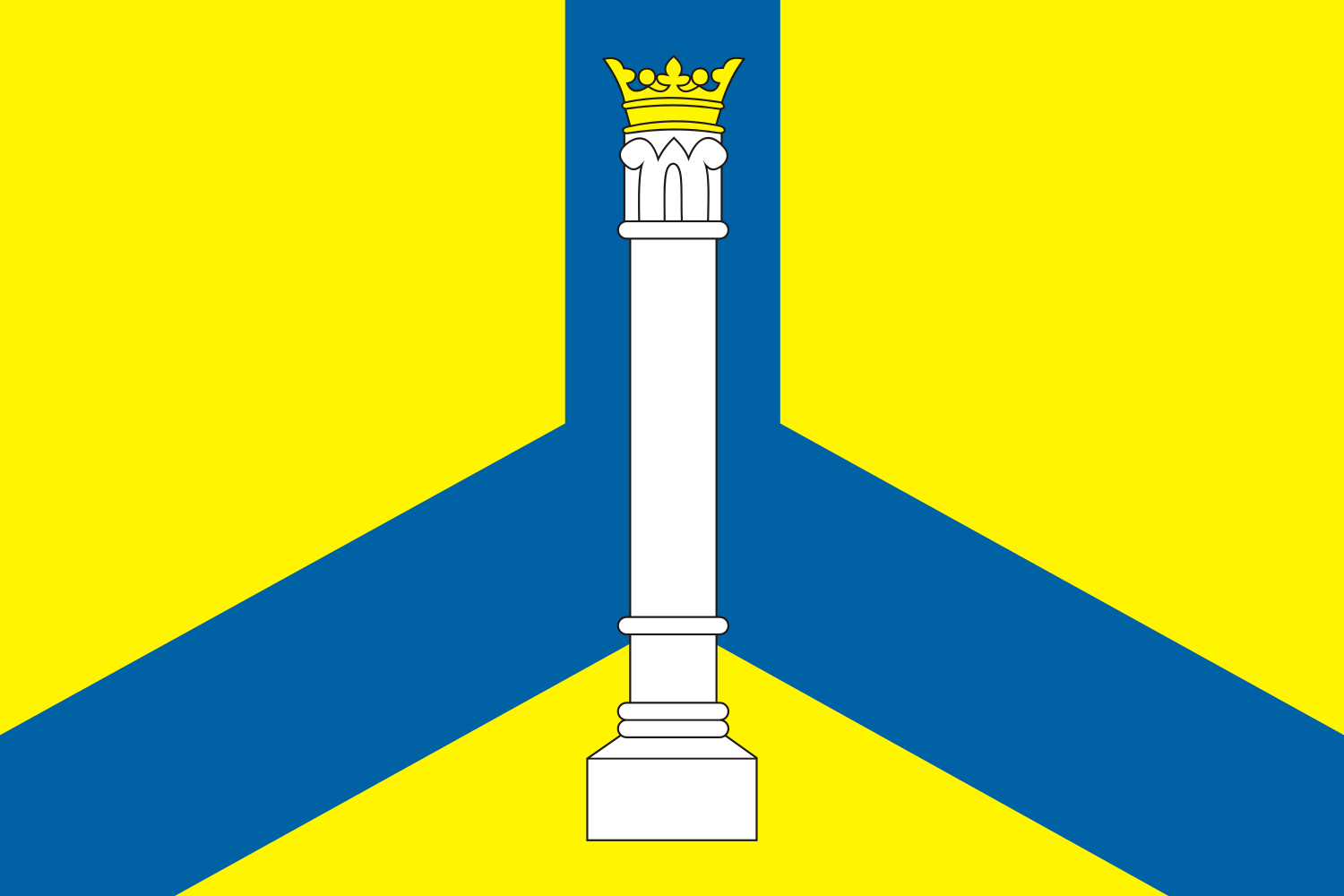
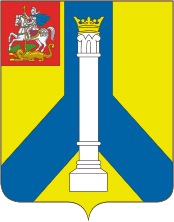
- Flag Coat of arms
- Location of Kolomensky District in Moscow Oblast
- Coordinates: 55°05′N 38°47′E
- Country: Russia
- Federal subject: Moscow Oblast
- Established: 1929
- Administrative center: Kolomna

Area
  - Total: 1,112.28 km^{2} (429.45 sq mi)

Population (2010 Census)
  - Total: 44,856
  - Density: 40.328/km^{2} (104.45/sq mi)
  - Urban: 8.6%
  - Rural: 91.4%

Administrative structure
  - Administrative divisions: 1 Work settlements, 8 Rural settlements
  - Inhabited localities: 1 urban-type settlements, 145 rural localities

Municipal structure
  - Municipally incorporated as: Kolomensky Municipal District
  - Municipal divisions: 1 urban settlements, 8 rural settlements
- Time zone: UTC+3 (MSK)
- OKTMO ID: 46622000
- Website: http://www.kolomna-region.ru/

Kolomensky District (Russian: Коло́менский райо́н) is an administrative and municipal district (raion), one of the thirty-six in Moscow Oblast, Russia. It is located in the southeast of the oblast and borders with Lukhovitsky, Ozyorsky, Stupinsky, Voskresensky, and with Yegoryevsky Districts and the territory of the City of Kolomna. The area of the district is 1,112.28 square kilometers (429.45 sq mi). Its administrative center is the city of Kolomna (which is not administratively a part of the district). Population: 44,856 (2010 census); 40,780 (2002 Census); 44,477 (1989 Soviet census).

== Geography ==
Main rivers flowing through the district are the Oka and the Moskva. They are relatively clean.

== History ==
The district was established in 1929.

== Governance ==
=== Administrative and municipal status ===
Within the framework of administrative divisions, Kolomensky District is one of the thirty-six in the oblast. The city of Kolomna serves as its administrative center, despite being incorporated separately as a city under oblast jurisdiction—an administrative unit with the status equal to that of the districts.

As a municipal division, the district is incorporated as Kolomensky Municipal District. Kolomna City Under Oblast Jurisdiction is incorporated separately from the district as Kolomna Urban Okrug.

=== Local government ===
The key governing bodies of the district are the District Administration and the Council of Deputies. The head of the district is Andrei Valeryevich Vaulin (elected in 2014). He also heads the Council of Deputies. The Council of Deputies includes 19 deputies. The head of the District Administration is Alexey Dmitriyevich Popov, appointed by decision of the Council of Deputies on 6 March 2015.
