= Moscow Ring Railway =

Moscow Ring Railway may refer to:

- Moscow Central Circle
- Little Ring of the Moscow Railway
- Greater Ring of the Moscow Railway
