= Krasnoarmeysk, Moscow Oblast =

Town in Moscow Oblast, Russia

Krasnoarmeysk Красноармейск
- Town
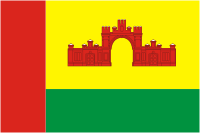
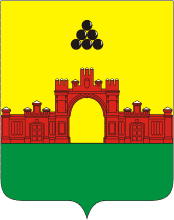
- Flag Coat of arms
- Interactive map of Krasnoarmeysk
- Location of Krasnoarmeysk Krasnoarmeysk (Moscow Oblast)
- Coordinates: 56°06′N 38°08′E
- Country: Russia
- Federal subject: Moscow Oblast
- Founded: 1928
- Town status since: 1947

Area
  - Total: 160.7 km^{2} (62.0 sq mi)
- Elevation: 150 m (490 ft)

Population (2010 Census)
  - Total: 26,294
  - Estimate (2024): 26,606 (+1.2%)
  - Density: 163.6/km^{2} (423.8/sq mi)

Administrative status
  - Subordinated to: Krasnoarmeysk Town Under Oblast Jurisdiction
  - Capital of: Krasnoarmeysk Town Under Oblast Jurisdiction

Municipal status
  - Urban okrug: Krasnoarmeysk Urban Okrug
  - Capital of: Krasnoarmeysk Urban Okrug
- Time zone: UTC+3 (MSK)
- Postal code: 141292
- OKTMO ID: 46758000011
- Website: www.krasn.mosreg.ru

Krasnoarmeysk urban okrug in Moscow Oblast

Krasnoarmeysk (Russian: Красноарме́йск) is a town in Moscow Oblast, Russia, on the Vorya (Klyazma's tributary) 51 kilometers (32 mi) northeast of Moscow. Population: 26,294 (2010 census); 26,051 (2002 census); 27,460 (1989 Soviet census).

== History ==
The town grew from the village of Muromtsevo (Му́ромцево), where a textile factory was established in 1834. In 1928, the settlements around the textile factory were merged into the settlement of Krasnoflotsky (Краснофло́тский), which in 1929 was renamed Krasnoarmeysky (Красноарме́йский). Town status was granted to the settlement in 1947, when it was renamed Krasnoarmeysk.

== Administrative and municipal status ==
Within the framework of administrative divisions, it is incorporated as Krasnoarmeysk Town Under Oblast Jurisdiction—an administrative unit with the status equal to that of the districts. As a municipal division, Krasnoarmeysk Town Under Oblast Jurisdiction is incorporated as Krasnoarmeysk Urban Okrug.

== Economy ==
=== Transportation ===
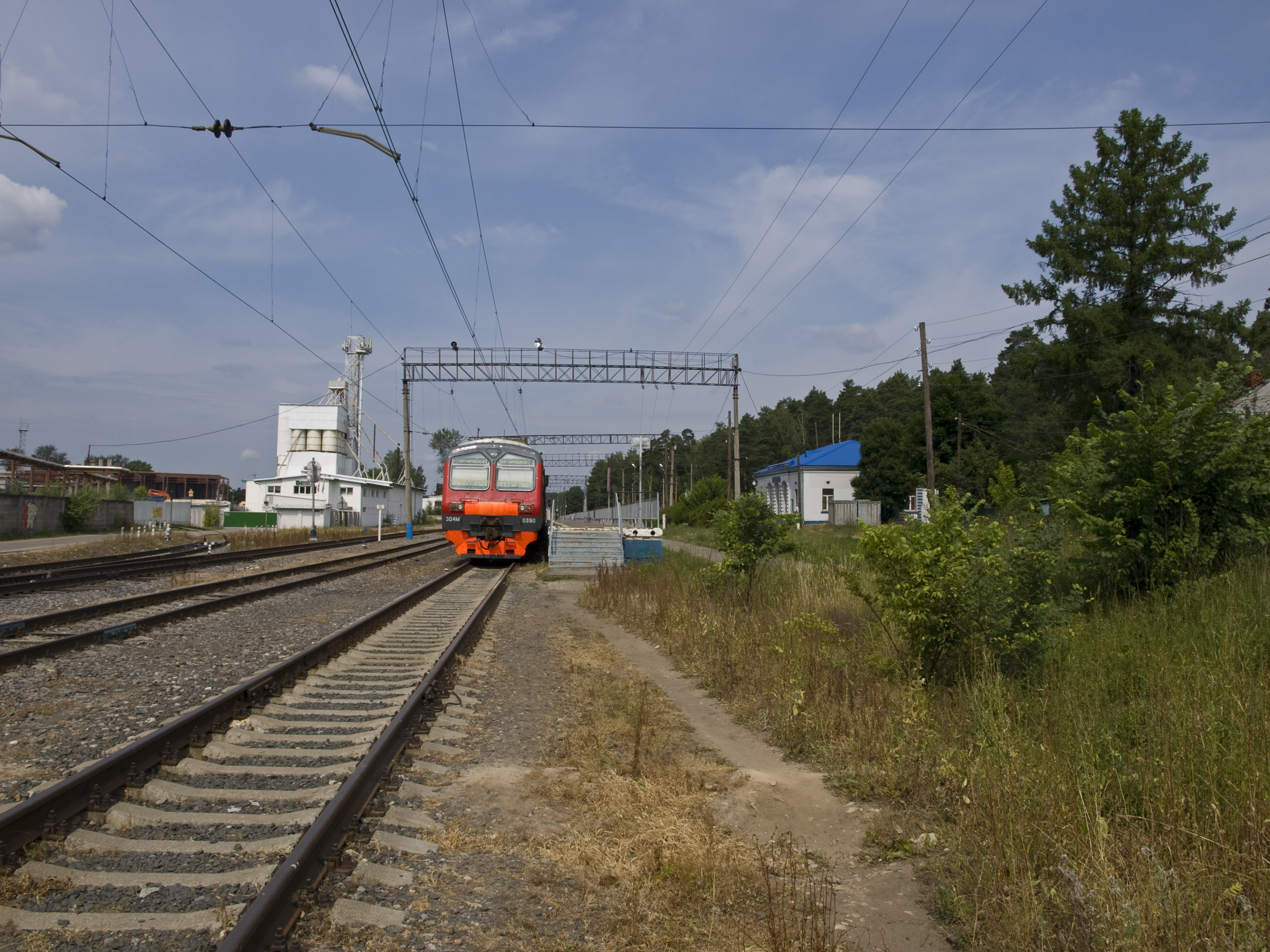
Krasnoarmeysk railway station

Krasnoarmeysk is a terminal station on a railway line branching in Sofrino from the railway connecting Moscow and Yaroslavl. There is an (infrequent) passenger service from Yaroslavsky railway station in Moscow.

== Notable people ==
- Vladimir Gerasimov (born 1975), footballer
- Alexander Legkov (born 1983), cross-country skier
