= Beloozyorsky =

Town in Moscow Oblast, Russia

Beloozyorsky Белоозёрский
- Town
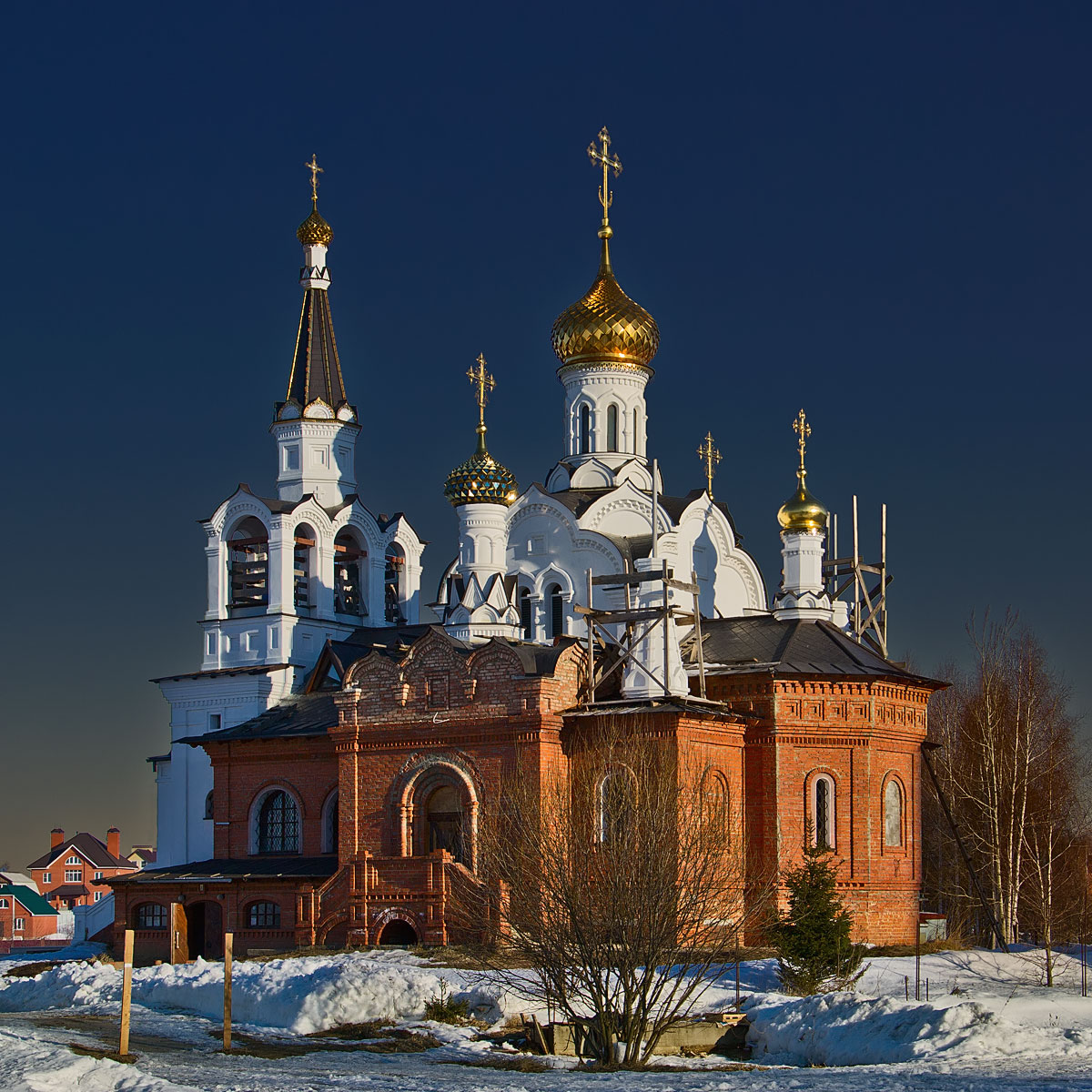
- Church of All Saints in Beloozyorsky

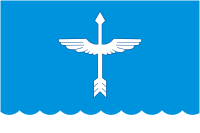
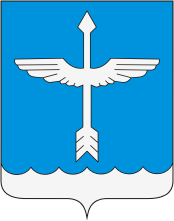
- Flag Coat of arms
- Interactive map of Beloozyorsky
- Location of Beloozyorsky Beloozyorsky (Moscow Oblast)
- Coordinates: 55.4589°N 38.4411°E
- Country: Russia
- Federal subject: Moscow Oblast
- Administrative district: Voskresensky District
- Founded: 1961
- Town status since: 2019

Population (2010 Census)
  - Total: 17,842
  - Estimate (2025): 13,437 (−24.7%)
- Time zone: UTC+3 (MSK)
- Postal code: 140250
- Dialing code: +7 49644
- OKTMO ID: 46710000006
- Website: beloozerskiy.vos-mo.ru

Beloozyorsky (Russian: Белоозёрский) is an urban locality (a town) in Voskresensky District of Moscow Oblast, Russia. Population: 13,737 (2021 census); 17,842 (2010 census); 14,494 (2002 census); 11,866 (1989 Soviet census).

Beloozyorsky lies on the left bank of the Moscow River 20 km northwest of district's administrative center, Voskresensk. It gained town status on 5 April 2019, being an urban-type settlement before that date. Beloozyorsky is connected with Moscow by the Ryazansky suburban railway line.
