= Udelny =

Udelny (masculine), Udelnaya (feminine), or Udelnoye (neuter) may refer to:

- Udelny (inhabited locality) (Udelnaya, Udelnoye), name of several inhabited localities in Russia
- Udelnaya (Saint Petersburg Metro), a station of the Saint Petersburg Metro, Saint Petersburg, Russia
