= Lesnoy, Pushkinsky District, Moscow Oblast =

Lesnoy Лесно́й
- Urban-type settlement
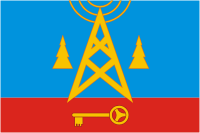
- Flag
- Interactive map of Lesnoy
- Location of Lesnoy Lesnoy (Moscow Oblast)
- Coordinates: 56°4′42″N 37°55′48″E
- Country: Russia
- Federal subject: Moscow Oblast
- Administrative district: Pushkinsky District
- Elevation: 170 m (560 ft)

Population (2010 Census)
  - Total: 8,569
  - Estimate (2025): 10,079 (+17.6%)
- Time zone: UTC+3 (MSK)
- Postal code: 141231
- OKTMO ID: 46647156051

Lesnoy (Russian: Лесно́й) is an urban locality (a work settlement) in Pushkinsky District of Moscow Oblast, Russia, located 42 kilometers (26 mi) northeast from Moscow on the road to Yaroslavl and Arkhangelsk. Population: 8,569 (2010 census); 8,761 (2002 census); 9,296 (1989 Soviet census).

Lesnoy history dates back to 1934, when Sovnarkom decided to build a transmitting radio center in Pushkinsky District. A settlement that grew around the radio center was officially named Lesnoy on April 1, 1954.
