= Imeni Tsyurupy =

Imeni Tsyurupy Имени Цюрупы
- Urban-type settlement
- Interactive map of Imeni Tsyurupy
- Location of Imeni Tsyurupy Imeni Tsyurupy (Moscow Oblast)
- Coordinates: 55.4963°N 38.6446°E
- Country: Russia
- Federal subject: Moscow Oblast
- Administrative district: Voskresensky District

Population (2010 Census)
  - Total: 4,352
  - Estimate (2025): 5,960 (+36.9%)
- Time zone: UTC+3 (MSK)
- Postal code: 140221
- OKTMO ID: 46606180051

Imeni Tsyurupy (Russian: Имени Цюрупы) is an urban locality (an urban-type settlement) in Voskresensky District of Moscow Oblast, Russia. Population: 5,926 (2021 census); 4,352 (2010 census); 3,959 (2002 census); 4,644 (1989 Soviet census).

== Geography ==
The settlement is located on the Nerskaya river coast.

== History ==
In the modern-day Imeni Tsyurupy territory there were Vanilovo, Minina and Levychino villages. During Ivan the Terrible’s time the owner of this land was Vasiliy Stepanovich Sobakin. Then Ugresha Monastery became it. In 19th century Minino was incorporated in Vanilovo.
