= Khorlovo =

Khorlovo Хорлово
- Urban-type settlement
- Interactive map of Khorlovo
- Location of Khorlovo Khorlovo (Moscow Oblast)
- Coordinates: 55.3309°N 38.8073°E
- Country: Russia
- Federal subject: Moscow Oblast
- Administrative district: Voskresensky District

Population (2010 Census)
  - Total: 7,875
  - Estimate (2025): 3,559 (−54.8%)
- Time zone: UTC+3 (MSK)
- Postal code: 140235
- OKTMO ID: 46606167051

Khorlovo (Russian: Хорлово) is an urban locality (an urban-type settlement) in Voskresensky District of Moscow Oblast, Russia. Population: 3,714 (2021 census); 7,875 (2010 census); 3,884 (2002 census); 4,468 (1989 Soviet census).
