= Fosforitny =

Urban locality in Moscow Oblast, Russia

Fosforitny Фосфоритный
- Urban-type settlement
- Interactive map of Fosforitny
- Location of Fosforitny Fosforitny (Moscow Oblast)
- Coordinates: 55°19′55.9″N 38°54′33.0″E
- Country: Russia
- Federal subject: Moscow Oblast
- Administrative district: Voskresensky District

Population
  - Estimate (2025): 3,878 )
- Time zone: UTC+3 (MSK)
- Postal code: 140241
- OKTMO ID: 46710000061

Fosforitny (Russian: Фосфоритный) is an urban locality (an work settlement) in Voskresensky District of Moscow Oblast, Russia. Population: 3,883 (2021 census); 4,193 (2002 census); 4,495 (1989 Soviet census).
