= Ashukino =

Ashukino Ашукино
- Work settlement
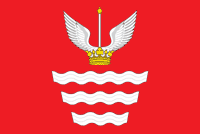
- Flag
- Interactive map of Ashukino
- Location of Ashukino Ashukino (Moscow Oblast)
- Coordinates: 56°09′47″N 37°56′38″E
- Country: Russia
- Federal subject: Moscow Oblast
- Administrative district: Pushkinsky District
- Elevation: 191 m (627 ft)

Population (2010 Census)
  - Total: 9,942
  - Estimate (2025): 8,850 (−11%)

Municipal status
  - Municipal district: Pushkinsky Municipal District
  - Urban settlement: Ashukino Urban Settlement
  - Capital of: Ashukino Urban Settlement
- Time zone: UTC+3 (MSK)
- Postal code: 141250
- OKTMO ID: 46758000056

Ashukino (Russian: Ашукино) is an urban locality (urban-type settlement) in Pushkinsky District of Moscow Oblast, Russia. Population: 9,942 (2010 census); 6,362 (2002 census); 4,585 (1989 Soviet census).
