= Cherkizovo (urban-type settlement) =

Cherkizovo Черкизово
- Urban-type settlement
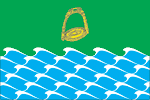
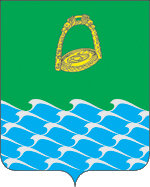
- Flag Coat of arms
- Interactive map of Cherkizovo
- Location of Cherkizovo Cherkizovo (Moscow Oblast)
- Coordinates: 55.9689°N 37.7834°E
- Country: Russia
- Federal subject: Moscow Oblast
- Administrative district: Pushkinsky District

Population (2010 Census)
  - Total: 3,559
  - Estimate (2025): 4,188 (+17.7%)
- Time zone: UTC+3 (MSK)
- Postal code: 141221
- OKTMO ID: 46647168051

Cherkizovo (Russian: Черкизово) is an urban locality (an urban-type settlement) in Pushkinsky District of Moscow Oblast, Russia. Population: 3,559 (2010 census); 3,468 (2002 census); 4,824 (1989 Soviet census).
