= Imeni Vorovskogo, Russia =

imeni Vorovskogo (Russian: имени Воровского) is the name of several inhabited localities in Russia.

Urban localities

- imeni Vorovskogo, Moscow Oblast, a work settlement in Noginsky District, Moscow Oblast

Rural localities

- imeni Vorovskogo, Vladimir Oblast, a settlement in Sudogodsky District of Vladimir Oblast
