= Malino Airfield =

- IATA: none; ICAO: ЬУММ

Summary
- Coordinates: 55°4′55″N 38°8′41″E
- Interactive map of Malino Airfield

Runways
Direction	Length		Surface
Direction	ft	m	Surface
10/28		1,800х80

Malino (ICAO: XXXX, FAA LID: XXX) is a military airfield in the Moscow region, located 3.5 km south-west of Malino, Moscow Oblast, Russia.

On March 23, 1943, the regiment of Vasily Stalin flew over to the Malino airfield near Moscow.

In the 1960s, a regiment based on Mi-4S helicopters was based in Malino, the main task of which was transportation and, if necessary, evacuation of the USSR leadership. In the 1990s, the regiment was reduced to a squadron, and then re-formed into the 206th air base, which was part of the 8th ADON. The aircraft base contained Mi-8 helicopters of various modifications.

Mi-8 helicopters of the 206th aviation base took part in the parade on Red Square on May 9, 2008 in honor of the 63rd anniversary of the Great Victory over Nazi Germany.

On April 27, 2011, 7 Mi-8 helicopters redeployed from Malino to the Chkalovsky airfield. Only the commandant's office remained in Malino. The equipment and flight crews now serve at the Chkalovsky airfield.

Since 2016, the airfield is used for commercial purposes LLC "FlytZon".

== See also ==
- List of Russian military airfields
