= Ilyinsky, Moscow Oblast =

Ilyinsky Ильинский
- Urban-type settlement
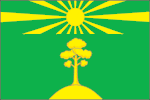
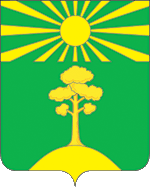
- Flag Coat of arms
- Interactive map of Ilyinsky
- Location of Ilyinsky Ilyinsky (Moscow Oblast)
- Coordinates: 55°37′00″N 38°07′00″E
- Country: Russia
- Federal subject: Moscow Oblast
- Administrative district: Ramensky District

Population (2010 Census)
  - Total: 10,279
  - Estimate (2025): 14,787 (+43.9%)
- Time zone: UTC+3 (MSK)
- Postal code: 140121
- OKTMO ID: 46648155051

Ilyinsky (Russian: Ильинский) is an urban-type settlement in Ramensky District, Moscow Oblast, Russia, located 17 kilometres (11 mi) southeast from Moscow in a forested area near the town of Zhukovsky on both sides of the Ilyinskaya railway station (Kazan direction).

Population: 11,341 (2019), 10,279 (2010 census); 7,995 (2002 census); 8,450 (1989 Soviet census).

== History ==
In the 19th century these territories were part of the landed estate owned by count Vorontsov-Dashkov, with the centre in Bykovo. In the last quarter of the 19th century N.I. Ilyin, who was a member of the management board of ‘JSC for the construction of the Moscow-Ryazan railroad’, bought the estate. After his death, his widow owned these lands until the revolution of 1917.

The construction of the railroad contributed to the rapid development of the whole Left bank of the Moscow river. Ilyins turned out very enterprising owners and started to sell and rent out large pieces of land for development to the Moscow elite at a high price. They also let build numerous villas themselves, subsequently leasing those to the Muscovites. Furthermore, they started a dairy farm to supply the summer residents with fresh milk and cultivated vegetables for the same purpose.

Later, the Board of the Moscow railroads purchased part of the land for their employees. The settlement grew gradually. Among pine forests, the local residents dug two ponds and built baths, they also started cutting alleys and streets in this forested area, built a power plant and other facilities. Bykovo village was developed the same way. The cottages (dachas) in Ilyinsky belonged to the merchants, directors of Moscow plants, in particular, the publisher I.D. Sytina, various artists. New residents usually bought large land plots, where they created gardens and built country houses with servants’ quarters.

In 1913 a church was built in Ilyinsky which then burned in the late 20-ies. In the summer of 1994 a stone with cross were placed at this place, which gave a kick-start to the restoration of the temple of Peter and Paul by the parishioners and sponsors. After the revolution, most of the large villas were nationalized. Some turned into orphanages and kindergartens; others were rented out as summer dachas or for permanent living.

According to the census conducted in 1926 the village of Ilyinsky had 225 homes and 1371 residents. There was a village council, which functioned actively in 30-ies, when 300 workers’ families of Ramensky textile factory ‘Red Banner’ (Krasnoe Znamya) were moved to Ilyinsky to improve their living conditions.

In 1975 the status of urban-type settlement was granted to Ilyinsky.

The museum ‘Scorched youth’ is located in school № 25. In 1941 on the first day of the Great Patriotic War all 25 students from the same 9 grade volunteered to the front. Only four of them got home alive. One of the survivors — Yuri Denitsky (literary pseudonym – Yuri Ilyinsky) wrote about his comrades a few books, including ‘Scorched youth’.

== Economy and geography ==
Most of the territory of the township is located to the north of the railway.

To the north of the township, there are large forest areas and Apariha village. Ilyinsky borders on the villages of Kratovo and Popovka in the east, on Zhukovsky in the south, on Bykovo in the west.

Ilyinsky is a well-known summer resort. The pond and recreation area with athletic fields (football, volleyball, basketball) and children's playground in the central part of the township is a popular place among local residents. On September 19, 2015 the local administration opened Ilyins’ square with public garden and a fountain next to the railway station.

There are two children's recreation facilities, two secondary schools (№ 25 and 26), a kindergarten № 1956, a music school, a house of culture, a clinic. The township also has its own fire and police departments, two post offices.

Several bus routes run through the village: №10 (local route Ilyinskaya r/station - Ostrovsky local district), №11 (Shchorsa - Bykovo - ‘Pines’ sanatorium and public bus №70 (Rodniki r/station - Ramenskoye).

Food / department stores and pharmacies are located next to the railway station Ilyinskaya. In the northern part of the township (Ostrovsky district) there are also several grocery stores and a covered market. In the mall near the station there is a pet shop, children's clothing store and other commercial enterprises.

Local branch of Sberbank is located next to the railway station; there is an ATM of Moscow Credit Bank in the building of Ilinskaya management company.

There are several manufacturing enterprises, among which are:

· Branch № 3 of ‘Bykovskoe production Association’ specializing in the production of workwear, uniforms and accessories (shoulder straps, patches, etc.) for various security agencies;

· Production company ‘Interskol’ which is one of the largest Russian manufacturers of hardware and working tools;

· Siberian Horse Manufactory.

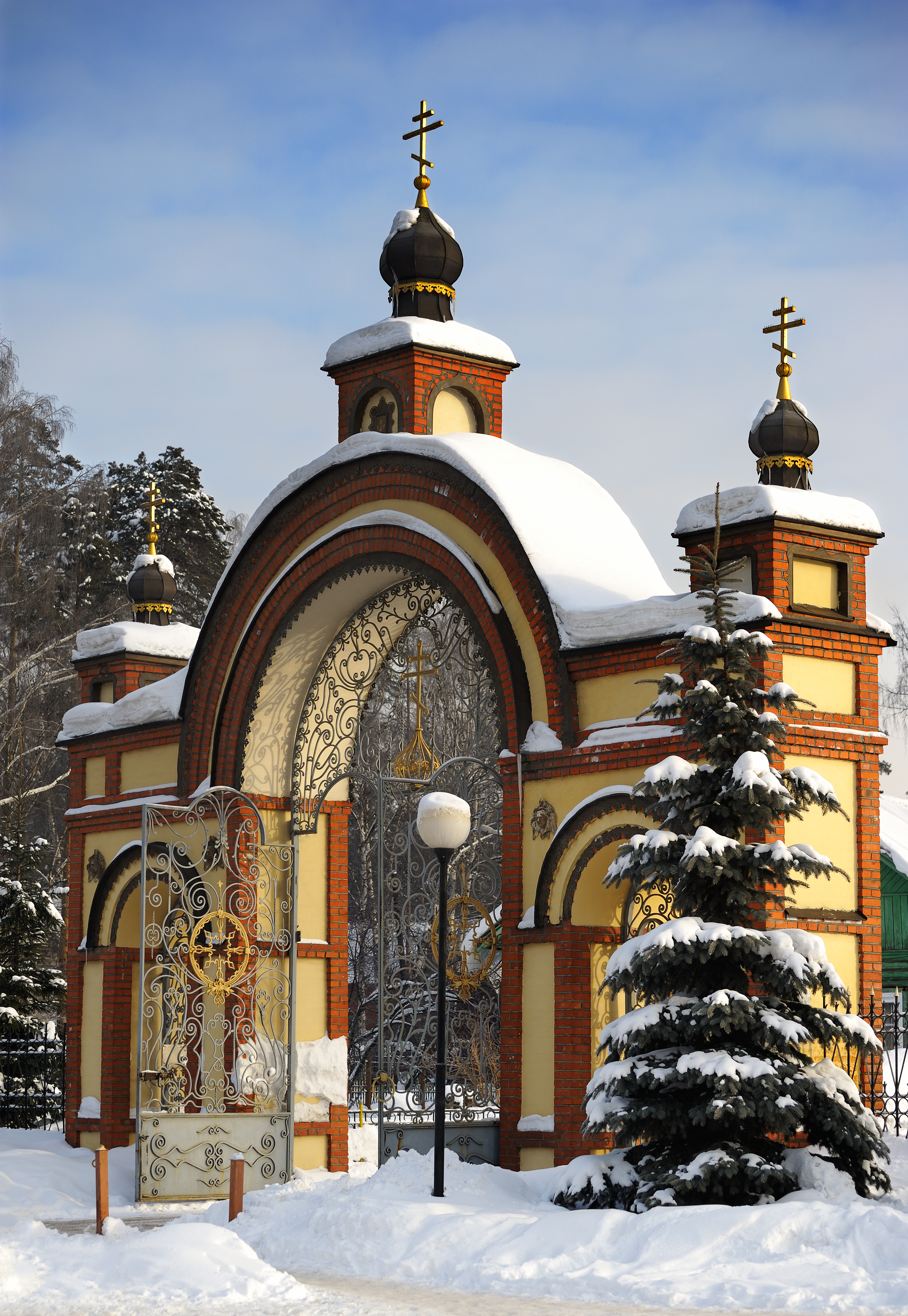
Peter and Paul Church gate

In the southern part of Ilyinsky, adjacent to Zhukovsky, there are several mini-hotels.

== Attractions ==
Next to the railway station there is a majestic temple complex of the Holy apostles Peter and Paul, which included the eponymous meter temple (used in the summer), the temple of the Prophet Elijah (ground floor, winter) and the Church of Presentation of the Blessed Virgin Mary (separate building). Archpriest Dimitry (Fedorov) is the father superior of the temple complex. On the temple grounds, there is the grave of the founder and the first farther superior, father Paul (Zhilin). The relics of the St. Optin elders and St. Alexander Yaroslavich Nevsky are revered sacred objects of the temple. On August 5, 2018, the Church of the Holy apostles Peter and Paul with the altars were solemnly consecrated by Juvenal, the metropolitan of Krutitsa and Kolomna.

Opposite the temple complex there is a small park area with a fountain and a monument ‘Eternal glory to the heroes who died for the Motherland in 1941-1945’.

In the southern part of the township, bordering on Zhukovsky city, there is an obelisk ‘Scorched youth’ dedicated to the students of the school № 25 who went to the front on the first day of the Great Patriotic War.
