= Rodniki, Ramensky District, Moscow Oblast =

Rodniki Родники
- Urban-type settlement
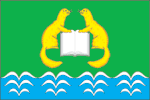
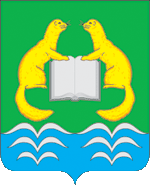
- Flag Coat of arms
- Interactive map of Rodniki
- Location of Rodniki Rodniki (Moscow Oblast)
- Coordinates: 55.6520°N 38.0657°E
- Country: Russia
- Federal subject: Moscow Oblast
- Administrative district: Ramensky District
- Founded: 1914

Population (2010 Census)
  - Total: 5,227
  - Estimate (2025): 5,406 (+3.4%)
- Time zone: UTC+3 (MSK)
- Postal code: 140143
- OKTMO ID: 46648162051

Rodniki (Russian: Родники) is an urban locality (an urban-type settlement) in Ramensky District of Moscow Oblast, Russia. Population: 5,227 (2010 census); 3,741 (2002 census); 4,068 (1989 Soviet census).
