= Peski, Kolomensky District, Moscow Oblast =

Peski Пески
- Urban-type settlement
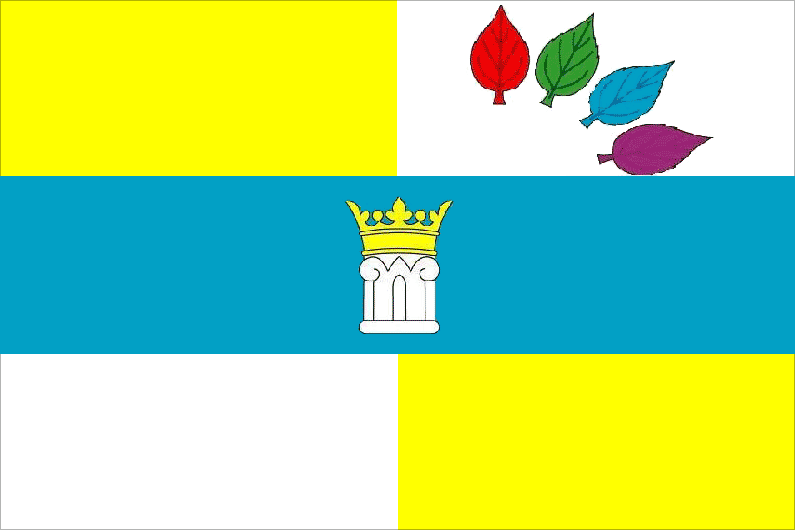
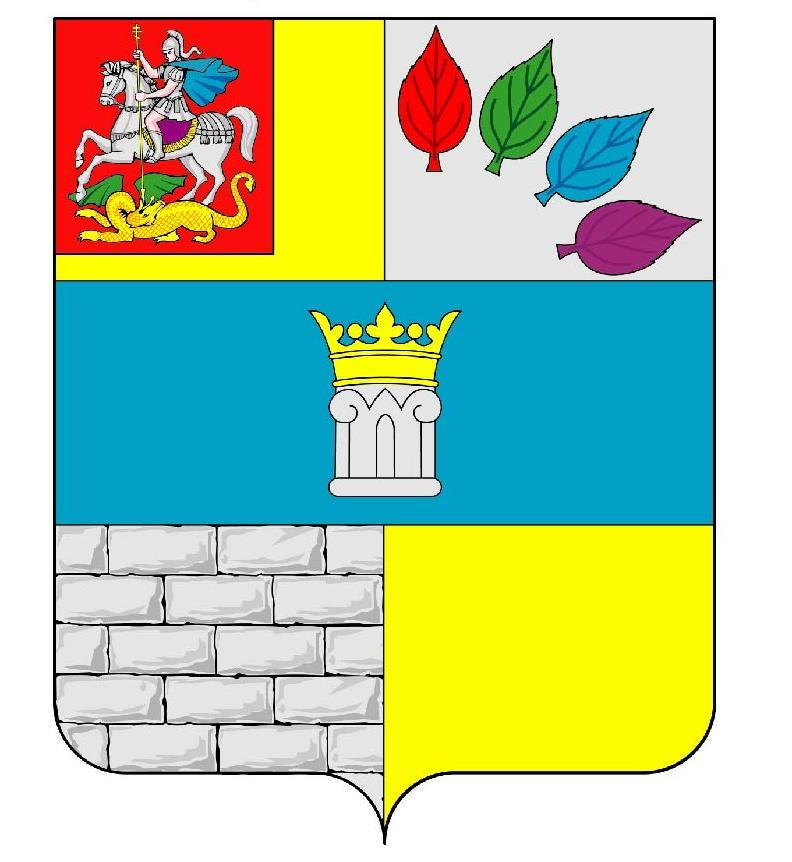
- Flag Coat of arms
- Interactive map of Peski
- Location of Peski Peski (Moscow Oblast)
- Coordinates: 55.2130°N 38.7732°E
- Country: Russia
- Federal subject: Moscow Oblast
- Administrative district: Kolomensky District

Population (2010 Census)
  - Total: 3,845
  - Estimate (2021): 3,277 (−14.8%)
- Time zone: UTC+3 (MSK)
- Postal code: 140477
- OKTMO ID: 46738000056

Peski (Russian: Пески) is an urban locality (an urban-type settlement) in Kolomensky District of Moscow Oblast, Russia. Population: 3,845 (2010 census); 3,736 (2002 census); 4,074 (1989 Soviet census).

== Paleontology ==
In 1995, fossils of dipnoan fish Ceratodus segnis were found in the Middle Jurassic deposits of Peski.
