= Pushkino, Pushkinsky District, Moscow Oblast =

City in Moscow Oblast, Russia

Pushkino Пушкино
- City
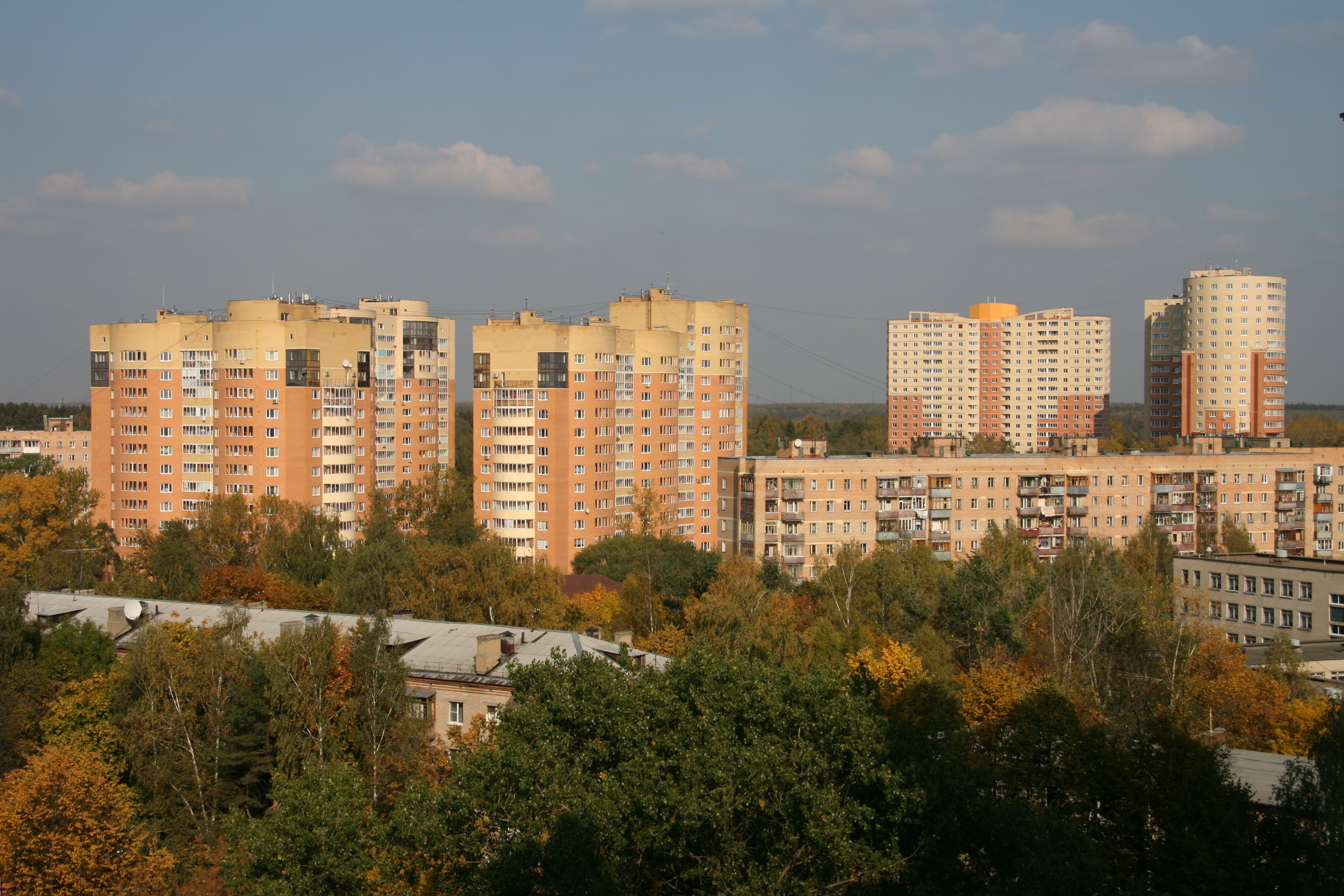
- Residential buildings in Pushkino

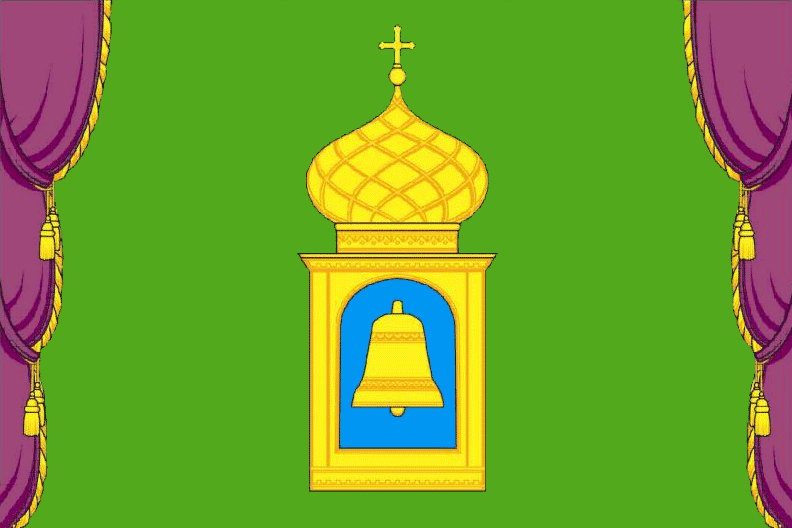
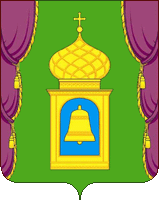
- Flag Coat of arms
- Interactive map of Pushkino
- Location of Pushkino Pushkino (Moscow Oblast)
- Coordinates: 56°01′N 37°50′E
- Country: Russia
- Federal subject: Moscow Oblast
- Administrative district: Pushkinsky District
- CitySelsoviet: Pushkino
- First mentioned: 1499
- City status since: August 1925
- Elevation: 160 m (520 ft)

Population (2010 Census)
  - Total: 102,874
  - Estimate (2025): 112,807 (+9.7%)
  - Rank: 157th in 2010

Administrative status
  - Capital of: Pushkinsky District, City of Pushkino

Municipal status
  - Municipal district: Pushkinsky Municipal District
  - Urban settlement: Pushkino Urban Settlement
  - Capital of: Pushkinsky Municipal District, Pushkino Urban Settlement
- Time zone: UTC+3 (MSK)
- Postal codes: 141200–141203, 141205–141208, 141230, 141240, 141241, 141254
- OKTMO ID: 46758000001
- Website: www.pushkino-adm.ru

Pushkino (Russian: Пу́шкино, Russian pronunciation: [ˈpuʂkʲɪnə]) is a city and the administrative center of Pushkinsky District in Moscow Oblast, Russia, located at the confluence of the Ucha and Serebryanka Rivers, 30 kilometers (19 mi) northeast of Moscow. Population: 102,874 (2010 census); 72,425 (2002 census); 75,847 (1989 Soviet census); 57,000 (1974); 30,000 (1959); 21,000 (1939).

== History ==
According to one of the historic versions, the village of Pushkino was first documented in 1499 when it belonged to Grigory Morkhinin, also known as "Pushka"—a boyar whose male-line descendants include Aleksandr Pushkin. A statue of "Pushka" graces one of the town's main squares. During the following centuries, the neighborhood evolved into a favored summer retreat of Russian nobility. Pushkino was granted town status in August 1925.

== Administrative and municipal status ==
Within the framework of administrative divisions of Russia, Pushkino serves as the administrative center of Pushkinsky District. As an administrative division, it is incorporated within Pushkinsky District as the City of Pushkino. As a municipal division, the City of Pushkino is incorporated within Pushkinsky Municipal District as Pushkino Urban Settlement.

== Science ==
The city hosts the Institute of Forest Science, one of the few in Russia.

== Architecture and culture ==
In 1678, a five-domed church of St. Sergius was built at the manor of Komyagino (picture). Another notable estate is Muranovo, where the Russian poets Yevgeny Baratynsky and Fyodor Tyutchev used to spend their summers. A dacha of Vladimir Mayakovsky, who lived in Pushkino during summer seasons of 1920-1928 is also a museum.

== Twin towns and sister cities ==
Pushkino is twinned with:

- Kutná Hora, Czech Republic
- Orivesi, Finland

== See also ==
- Category:People from Pushkino
