= Zhilyovo =

Zhilyovo Жилёво
- Urban-type settlement
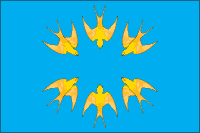
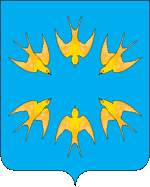
- Flag Coat of arms
- Interactive map of Zhilyovo
- Location of Zhilyovo Zhilyovo (Moscow Oblast)
- Coordinates: 54.9842°N 38.0257°E
- Country: Russia
- Federal subject: Moscow Oblast
- Administrative district: Stupinsky District

Population (2010 Census)
  - Total: 2,472
  - Estimate (2025): 1,942 (−21.4%)
- Time zone: UTC+3 (MSK)
- Postal code: 142820
- OKTMO ID: 46776000056

Zhilyovo (Russian: Жилёво) is an urban locality (an urban-type settlement) in Stupinsky District of Moscow Oblast, Russia. Population: 2,472 (2010 census); 2,468 (2002 census); 2,733 (1989 Soviet census).
