= Malino, Moscow Oblast =

Malino Малино
- Urban-type settlement
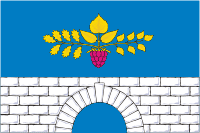
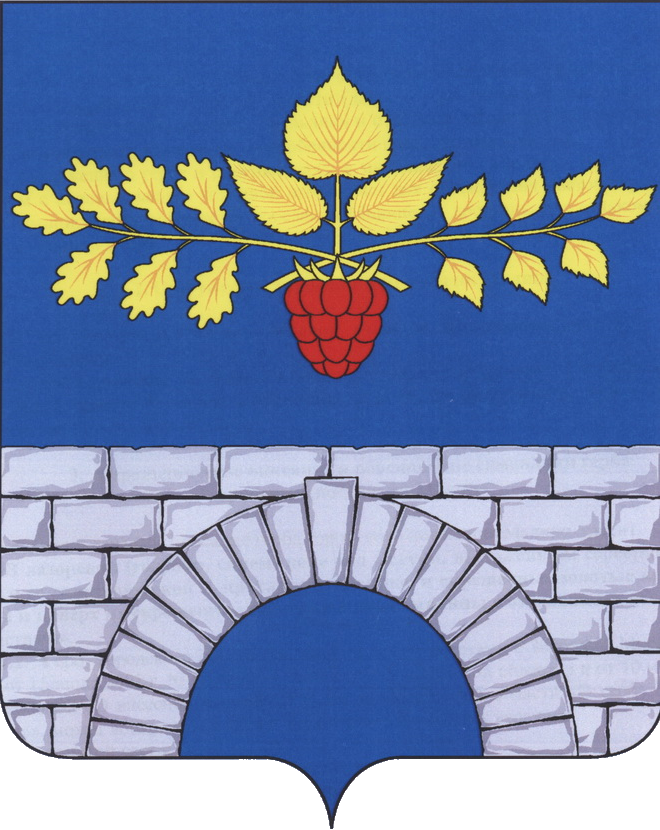
- Flag Coat of arms
- Interactive map of Malino
- Location of Malino Malino (Moscow Oblast)
- Coordinates: 55.1124°N 38.1755°E
- Country: Russia
- Federal subject: Moscow Oblast
- Administrative district: Stupinsky District

Population (2010 Census)
  - Total: 4,108
  - Estimate (2025): 3,426 (−16.6%)
- Time zone: UTC+3 (MSK)
- Postal code: 142850
- OKTMO ID: 46653156051

Malino (Russian: Ма́лино) is an urban locality (an urban-type settlement) in Stupinsky District of Moscow Oblast, Russia. Population: 4,108 (2010 census); 4,363 (2002 census); 3,172 (1989 Soviet census). It is the site of Malino Airfield.
