= Skoropuskovsky =

Skoropuskovsky Скоропусковский
- Urban-type settlement
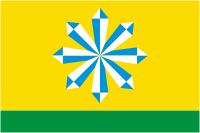
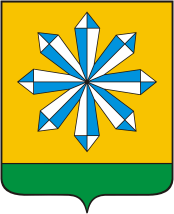
- Flag Coat of arms
- Interactive map of Skoropuskovsky
- Location of Skoropuskovsky Skoropuskovsky (Moscow Oblast)
- Coordinates: 56.3672°N 38.1422°E
- Country: Russia
- Federal subject: Moscow Oblast
- Administrative district: Sergiyevo-Posadsky District

Population (2010 Census)
  - Total: 6,685
  - Estimate (2025): 6,486 (−3%)
- Time zone: UTC+3 (MSK)
- Postal code: 141364
- OKTMO ID: 46615161051

Skoropuskovsky (Russian: Скоропусковский) is an urban locality (an urban-type settlement) in Sergiyevo-Posadsky District of Moscow Oblast, Russia. Population: 6,685 (2010 census); 5,479 (2002 census); 6,184 (1989 Soviet census).
