= Rzhavki =

Rzhavki Ржавки
- Urban-type settlement
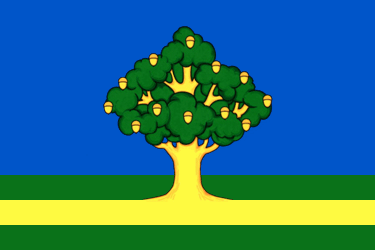
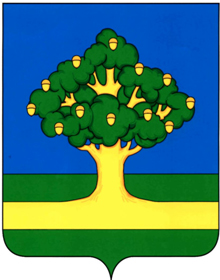
- Flag Coat of arms
- Interactive map of Rzhavki
- Location of Rzhavki Rzhavki (Moscow Oblast)
- Coordinates: 56.0136°N 37.2249°E
- Country: Russia
- Federal subject: Moscow Oblast
- Administrative district: Solnechnogorsky District
- Elevation: 220 m (720 ft)

Population (2010 Census)
  - Total: 4,038
  - Estimate (2025): 4,564 (+13%)
- Time zone: UTC+3 (MSK)
- Postal code: 141552
- OKTMO ID: 46652164051

Rzhavki (Russian: Ржавки) is an urban locality (an urban-type settlement) in Solnechnogorsky District of Moscow Oblast, Russia. Population: 4,038 (2010 census); 4,118 (2002 census);
