= Dedenevo =

Dedenevo Деденево
- Urban-type settlement
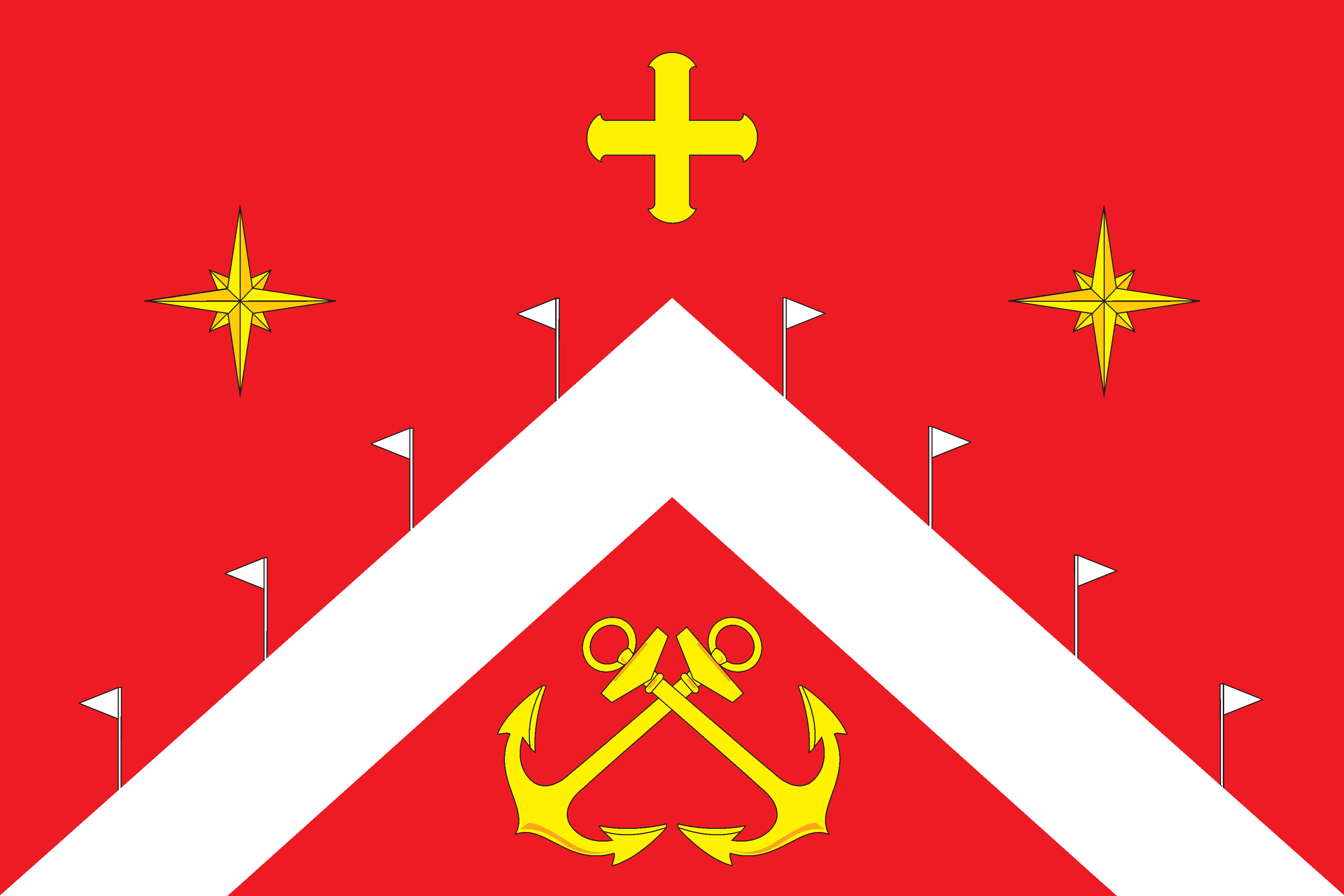
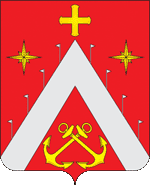
- Flag Coat of arms
- Interactive map of Dedenevo
- Location of Dedenevo Dedenevo (Moscow Oblast)
- Coordinates: 56.2418°N 37.5195°E
- Country: Russia
- Federal subject: Moscow Oblast
- Administrative district: Dmitrovsky District

Population (2010 Census)
  - Total: 6,319
  - Estimate (2025): 5,954 (−5.8%)
- Time zone: UTC+3 (MSK)
- Postal code: 141850
- OKTMO ID: 46608154051

Dedenevo (Russian: Деде́нево) or Dedenyovo (Russian: Деденёво) is an urban locality (an urban-type settlement) in Dmitrovsky District of Moscow Oblast, Russia. Population: 6,319 (2010 census); 6,509 (2002 census); 7,626 (1989 Soviet census).
