= Zarechye, Moscow Oblast =

Zarechye Заречье
- Urban-type settlement
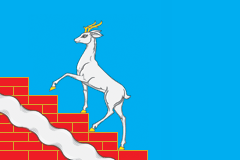
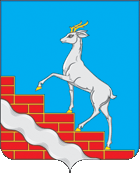
- Flag Coat of arms
- Interactive map of Zarechye
- Location of Zarechye Zarechye (Moscow Oblast)
- Coordinates: 55.6883°N 37.3966°E
- Country: Russia
- Federal subject: Moscow Oblast
- Administrative district: Odintsovsky District

Population (2010 Census)
  - Total: 6,270
  - Estimate (2025): 11,609 (+85.2%)
- Time zone: UTC+3 (MSK)
- Postal code: 143085
- OKTMO ID: 46641157051

Zarechye (Russian: Заречье) is an urban locality (an urban-type settlement) in Odintsovsky District of Moscow Oblast, Russia. Population: 6,270 (2010 census); 5,110 (2002 census); Leonid Brezhnev died here in 1982.
