= Ramenskoye, Moscow Oblast =

Town in Russia

Ramenskoye Раменское
- Town
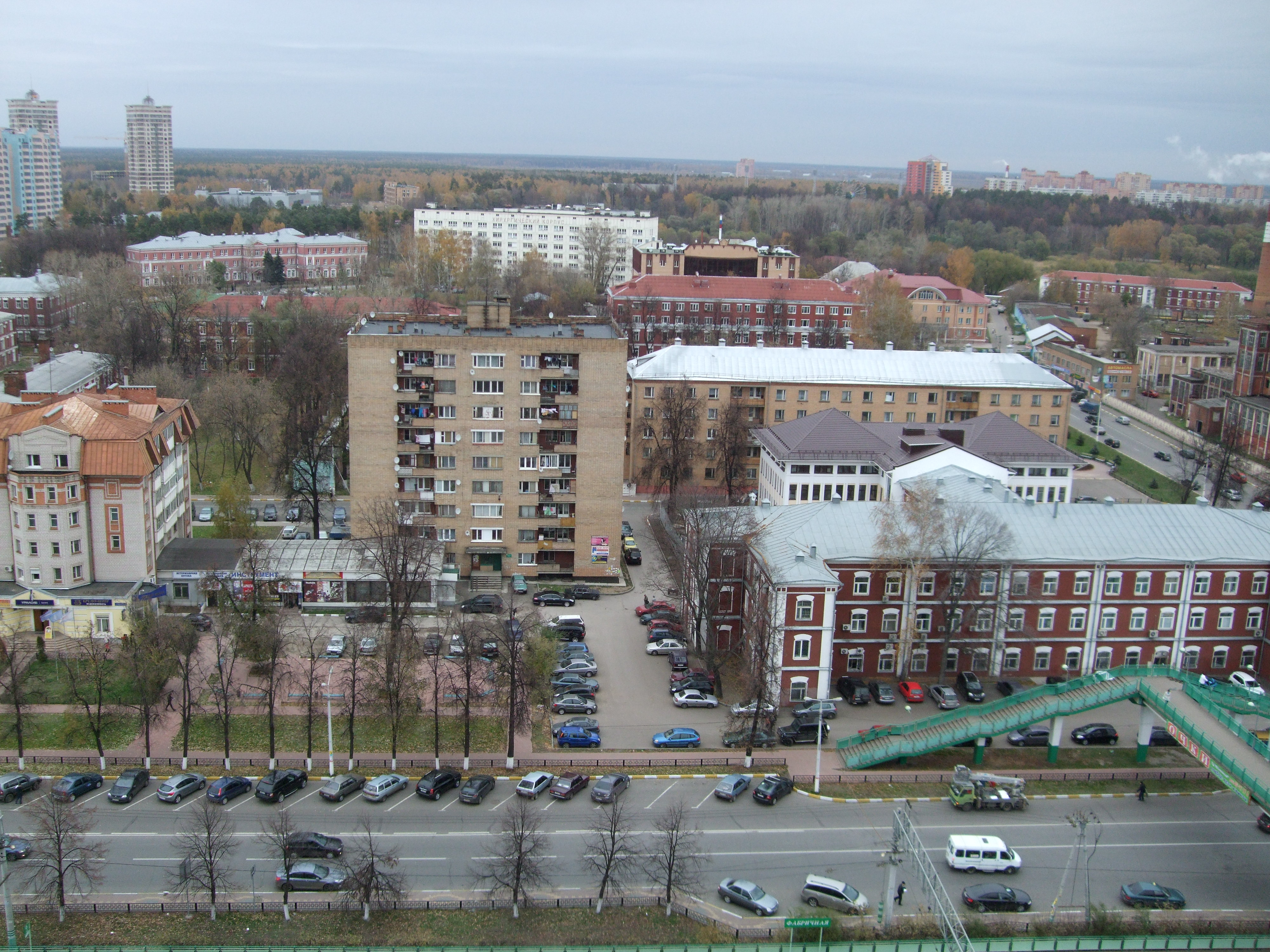
- View of Ramenskoye

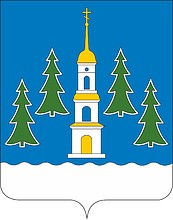
- Flag Coat of arms
- Interactive map of Ramenskoye
- Location of Ramenskoye Ramenskoye (European Russia) Ramenskoye (Europe)
- Coordinates: 55°34′08″N 38°13′31″E
- Country: Russia
- Federal subject: Moscow Oblast
- Administrative district: Ramensky District
- TownSelsoviet: Ramenskoye
- Founded: 1770s
- Town status since: March 15, 1926

Government
  - Leader: Nikolai Khanin
- Elevation: 125 m (410 ft)

Population (2010 Census)
  - Total: 96,317
  - Estimate (2025): 117,115 (+21.6%)
  - Rank: 176th in 2010

Administrative status
  - Capital of: Ramensky District, Town of Ramenskoye

Municipal status
  - Municipal district: Ramensky Municipal District
  - Urban settlement: Ramenskoye Urban Settlement
  - Capital of: Ramensky Municipal District, Ramenskoye Urban Settlement
- Time zone: UTC+3 (MSK)
- Postal codes: 140100–140105, 140108, 140109, 140116
- Dialing code: +7 49646
- OKTMO ID: 46568000001

Ramenskoye (Russian: Ра́менское, Russian pronunciation: [ˈramʲɪnskəjə]) is a town and the administrative center of Ramensky District in Moscow Oblast, Russia, located 46 kilometers (29 mi) southeast of Moscow.

== Etymology ==
The town's name derives from an Old Slavonic word "раменье" (ramenye), meaning "on the edge of forest".

== Population ==
Population: 114,537 (2021 census); 96,317 (2010 census); 82,074 (2002 census); 87,666 (1989 Soviet census); 69,000 (1974); 28,000 (1939).

== History ==
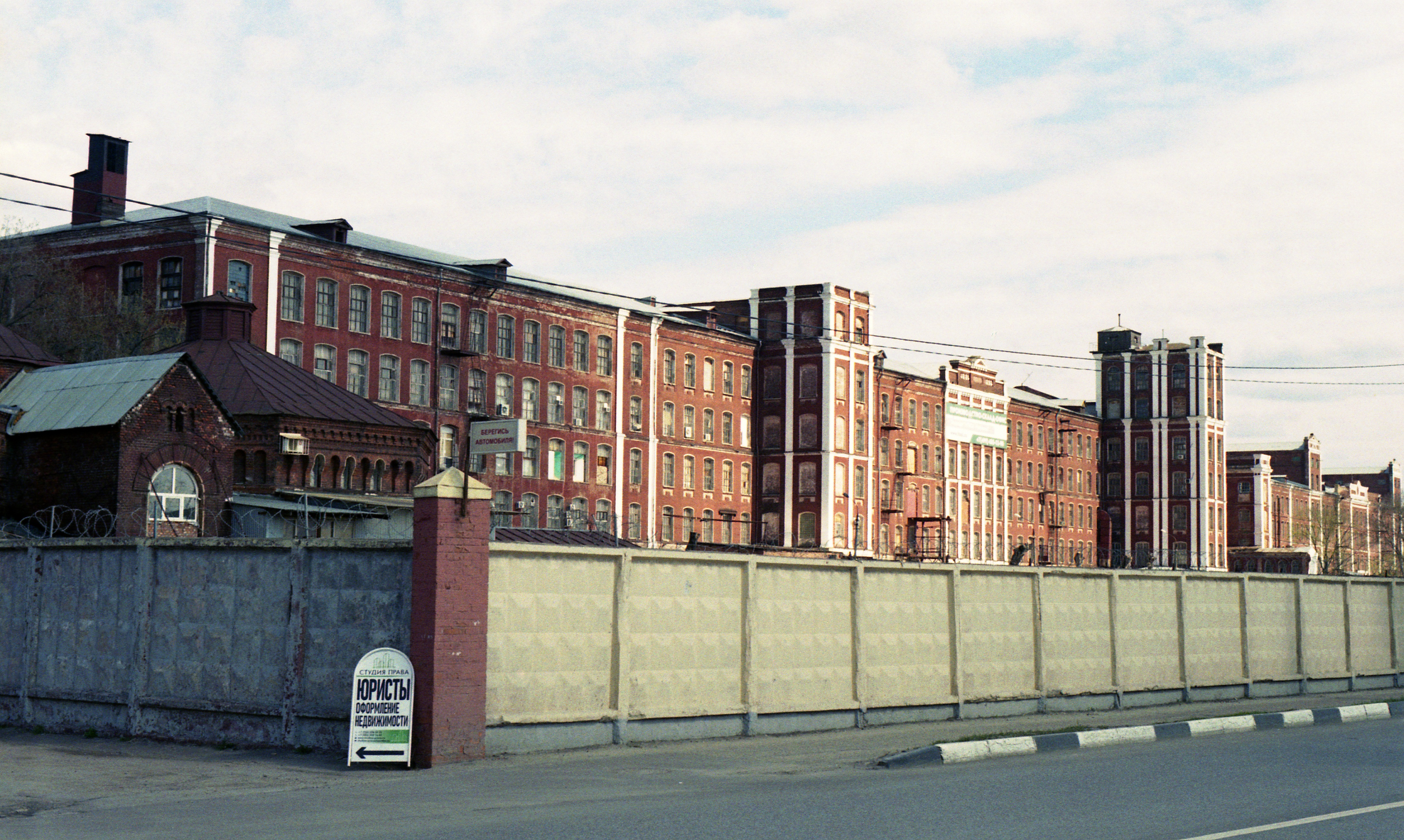
Main building of Ramenskoye textile factory

The area where the town now stands was first mentioned in 1328. A stone church was built here by Count Platon Musin-Pushkin in 1725–1730. In the 1770s, the selo of Novo-Troitskoye (Russian: Ново-Троицкое) was established here; its name later changed to Ramenskoye. In 1831, a textile factory was founded in Ramenskoye and by the second half of the 19th century, it had grown to be one of the largest enterprises in the Russian Empire. On March 15, 1926, Ramenskoye was granted town status.

=== Russo-Ukrainian War ===
On the night of 9 September 2024, during a large-scale Ukrainian drone attack on western Russia, a Ukrainian drone crashed into an apartment building in Ramenskoye, killing 1 and injuring 3 according to Moscow Oblast governor Andrey Vorobyov.

On 31 October 2025, the Ukrainian GUR operation in Ramenskoye exploded all three major fuel lines of the Koltsevoy fuel pipeline, or "ring pipeline" that encircles Moscow to provide three types of fuels to the Russian military industrial complex. The pipelines design capacity are "3 million tons of jet fuel, 2.8 million tons of diesel and 1.6 million tons of gasoline annually."

== Administrative and municipal status ==
Within the framework of administrative divisions, Ramenskoye serves as the administrative center of Ramensky District. As an administrative division, it is, together with the village of Dergayevo, incorporated within Ramensky District as the Town of Ramenskoye. As a municipal division, the Town of Ramenskoye is incorporated within Ramensky Municipal District as Ramenskoye Urban Settlement.

== Transportation ==
The Zhukovsky airport serves the Gromov Flight Research Institute.

== Sports ==
FC Saturn Ramenskoye is the local association football club.
