= Beloomut =

Beloomut Белоомут
- Urban-type settlement
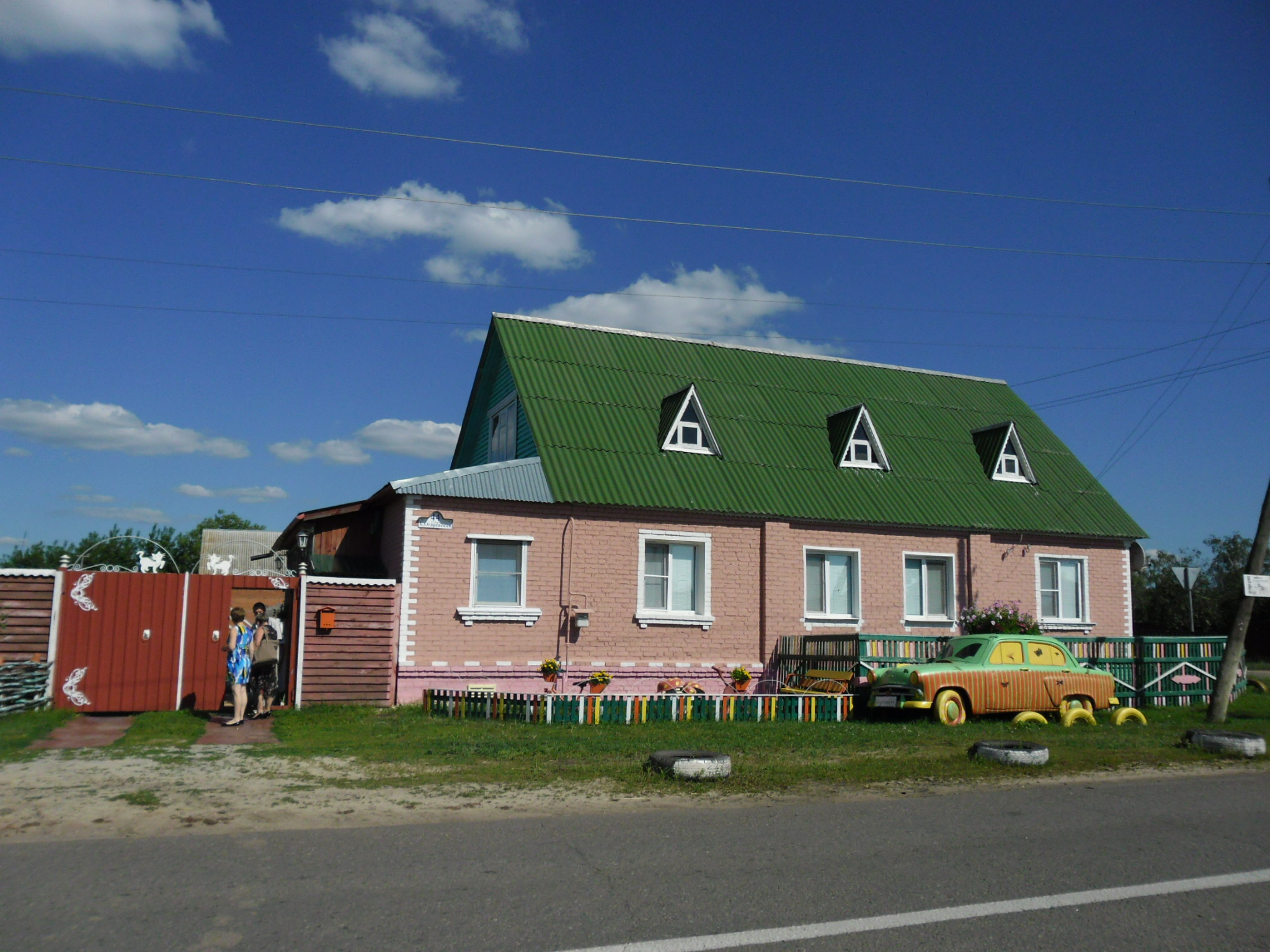

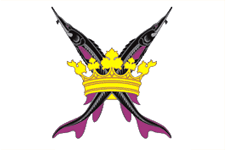
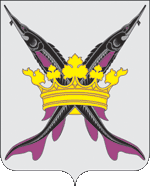
- Flag Coat of arms
- Interactive map of Beloomut
- Location of Beloomut Beloomut (Moscow Oblast)
- Coordinates: 54.9420°N 39.3439°E
- Country: Russia
- Federal subject: Moscow Oblast
- Administrative district: Lukhovitsky District
- Elevation: 108 m (354 ft)

Population (2010 Census)
  - Total: 6,558
  - Estimate (2025): 5,962 (−9.1%)
- Time zone: UTC+3 (MSK)
- Postal code: 140520
- OKTMO ID: 46547000056

Beloomut (Russian: Белоо́мут) is an urban locality (an urban-type settlement) in Lukhovitsky District of Moscow Oblast, Russia. The population is 6,558 (2010 census); 7,029 (2002 census); 8,305 (1989 Soviet census).
