= Pravdinsky (urban-type settlement) =

Pravdinsky Правдинский
- Urban-type settlement
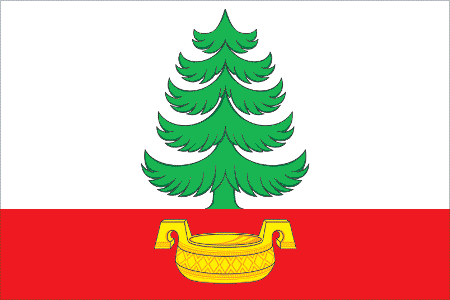
- Flag
- Interactive map of Pravdinsky
- Location of Pravdinsky Pravdinsky (Moscow Oblast)
- Coordinates: 56.0627°N 37.8600°E
- Country: Russia
- Federal subject: Moscow Oblast
- Administrative district: Pushkinsky District
- Founded: 1930

Population (2010 Census)
  - Total: 10,587
  - Estimate (2025): 10,009 (−5.5%)
- Time zone: UTC+3 (MSK)
- Postal code: 141260
- OKTMO ID: 46647158051

Pravdinsky (Russian: Правдинский) is an urban locality (an urban-type settlement) in Pushkinsky District of Moscow Oblast, Russia. Population: 10,587 (2010 census); 10,458 (2002 census); 11,295 (1989 Soviet census).
