= Zagoryansky =

Zagoryansky Загорянский
- Urban-type settlement
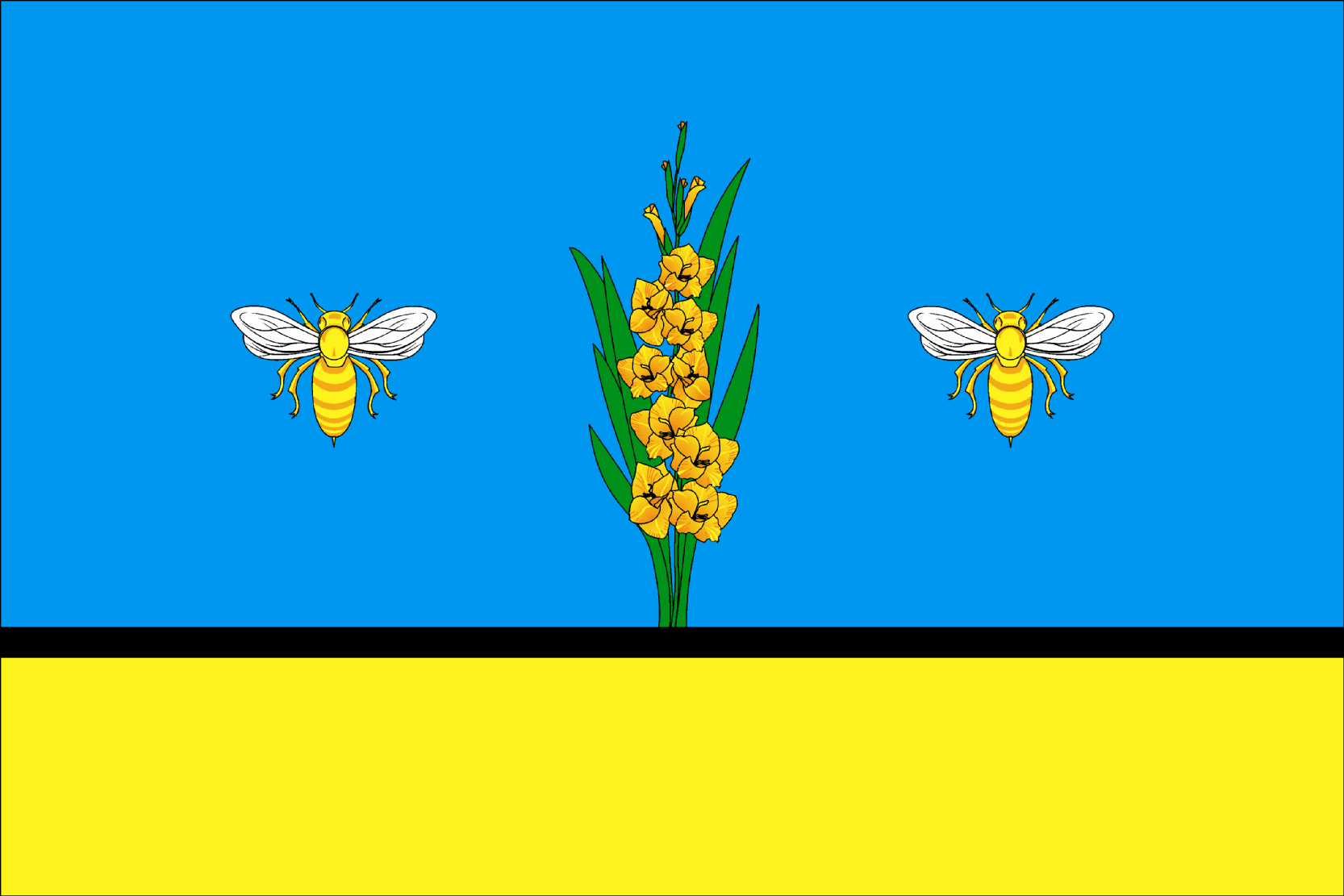
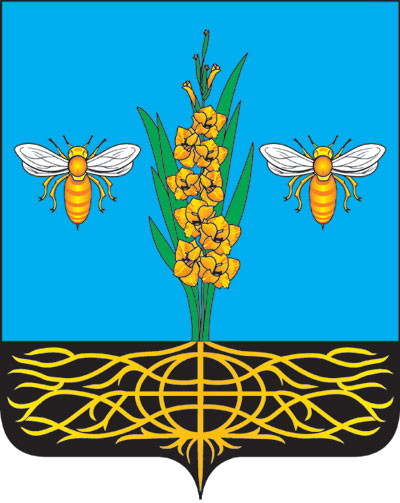
- Flag Coat of arms
- Interactive map of Zagoryansky
- Location of Zagoryansky Zagoryansky (Moscow Oblast)
- Coordinates: 55.9203°N 37.9285°E
- Country: Russia
- Federal subject: Moscow Oblast
- Administrative district: Shchyolkovsky District
- Elevation: 157 m (515 ft)

Population (2010 Census)
  - Total: 7,997
  - Estimate (2025): 10,357 (+29.5%)
- Time zone: UTC+3 (MSK)
- Postal code: 141180
- OKTMO ID: 46659152051

Zagoryansky (Russian: Загорянский) is an urban locality (an urban-type settlement) in Shchyolkovsky District of Moscow Oblast, Russia. Population: 7,997 (2010 census); 7,576 (2002 census); 5,177 (1989 Soviet census).
