= Udelnaya, Moscow Oblast =

Udelnaya Удельная
- Urban-type settlement
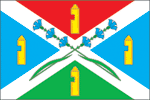
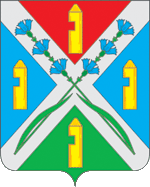
- Flag Coat of arms
- Interactive map of Udelnaya
- Location of Udelnaya Udelnaya (Moscow Oblast)
- Coordinates: 55.6355°N 38.0479°E
- Country: Russia
- Federal subject: Moscow Oblast
- Administrative district: Ramensky District

Population (2010 Census)
  - Total: 15,021
  - Estimate (2025): 18,113 (+20.6%)
- Time zone: UTC+3 (MSK)
- Postal code: 140140
- OKTMO ID: 46648168051

Udelnaya (Russian: Удельная) is an urban locality (an urban-type settlement) in Ramensky District of Moscow Oblast, Russia. Population: 15,021 (2010 census); 13,309 (2002 census); 11,334 (1989 Soviet census).
