= Snegiri =

Snegiri Снегири
- Urban-type settlement
- Interactive map of Snegiri
- Location of Snegiri Snegiri (Moscow Oblast)
- Coordinates: 55.8837°N 37.0334°E
- Country: Russia
- Federal subject: Moscow Oblast
- Administrative district: Istrinsky District

Population (2010 Census)
  - Total: 3,177
  - Estimate (2025): 5,446 (+71.4%)
- Time zone: UTC+3 (MSK)
- Postal code: 143590
- OKTMO ID: 46618156051

Snegiri (Russian: Снегири) is an urban locality (an urban-type settlement) in Istrinsky District of Moscow Oblast, Russia. Population: 3,177 (2010 census); 3,494 (2002 census); 4,252 (1989 Soviet census).
