= Sychyovo =

Sychyovo Сычёво
- Urban-type settlement
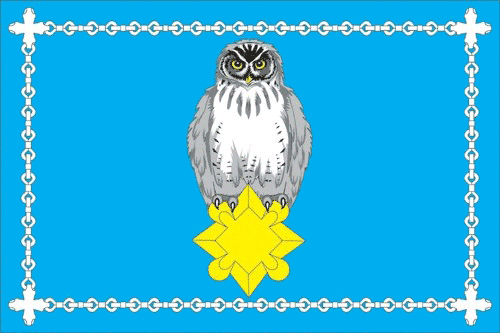
- Flag
- Interactive map of Sychyovo
- Location of Sychyovo Sychyovo (Moscow Oblast)
- Coordinates: 55.9577°N 36.2246°E
- Country: Russia
- Federal subject: Moscow Oblast
- Administrative district: Volokolamsky District

Population (2010 Census)
  - Total: 3,105
  - Estimate (2025): 3,151 (+1.5%)
- Time zone: UTC+3 (MSK)
- Postal code: 143611
- OKTMO ID: 46708000056

Sychyovo (Russian: Сычёво) is an urban locality (an urban-type settlement) in Volokolamsky District of Moscow Oblast, Russia. Population: 3,131 (2021 census); 3,105 (2010 census); 3,195 (2002 census); 3,007 (1989 Soviet census).
