= Cherusti =

Cherusti Черусти
- Urban-type settlement
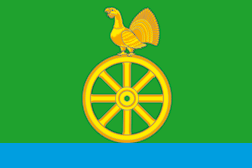
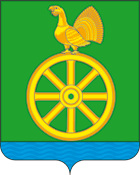
- Flag Coat of arms
- Interactive map of Cherusti
- Location of Cherusti Cherusti (Moscow Oblast)
- Coordinates: 55.5439°N 40.0052°E
- Country: Russia
- Federal subject: Moscow Oblast
- Administrative district: Shatursky District

Population (2010 Census)
  - Total: 2,862
  - Estimate (2025): 3,484 (+21.7%)
- Time zone: UTC+3 (MSK)
- Postal code: 140742
- OKTMO ID: 46657187051

Cherusti (Russian: Черусти) is an urban locality (an urban-type settlement) in Shatursky District of Moscow Oblast, Russia. Population: 2,862 (2010 census); 2,891 (2002 census); 3,779 (1989 Soviet census).
