= Sofrino =

Sofrino Софрино
- Urban-type settlement
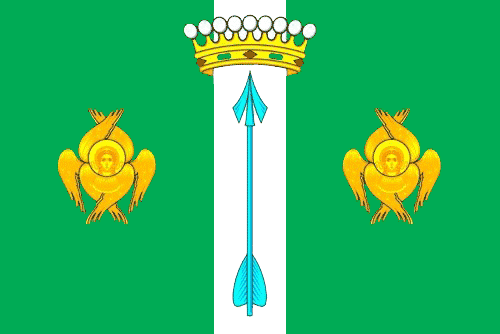
- Flag
- Interactive map of Sofrino
- Location of Sofrino Sofrino (Moscow Oblast)
- Coordinates: 56.1373°N 37.9319°E
- Country: Russia
- Federal subject: Moscow Oblast
- Administrative district: Pushkinsky District

Population (2010 Census)
  - Total: 15,771
  - Estimate (2025): 15,065 (−4.5%)
- Time zone: UTC+3 (MSK)
- Postal code: 141270
- OKTMO ID: 46647163051

Sofrino (Russian: Софрино) is an urban locality (an urban-type settlement) in Pushkinsky District of Moscow Oblast, Russia. Population: 15,771 (2010 census); 15,481 (2002 census); 11,866 (1989 Soviet census). It is a production center, where a Russian factory for the production of religious household items, from icons and temple decorations to priests' clothing, and the largest glycerin production enterprise in Europe are located.
