= Misheronsky =

Misheronsky Мишеронский
- Urban-type settlement
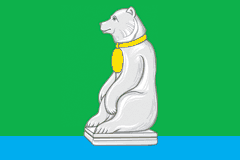
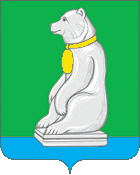
- Flag Coat of arms
- Interactive map of Misheronsky
- Location of Misheronsky Misheronsky (Moscow Oblast)
- Coordinates: 55.7189°N 39.7417°E
- Country: Russia
- Federal subject: Moscow Oblast
- Administrative district: Shatursky District

Population (2010 Census)
  - Total: 3,857
  - Estimate (2025): 4,631 (+20.1%)
- Time zone: UTC+3 (MSK)
- Postal code: 140722
- OKTMO ID: 46657163051

Misheronsky (Russian: Мишеронский) is an urban locality (an urban-type settlement) in Shatursky District of Moscow Oblast, Russia. Population: 3,857 (2010 census); 3,821 (2002 census); 4,249 (1989 Soviet census).
