= Ryazanovsky =

Ryazanovsky Рязановский
- Work settlement
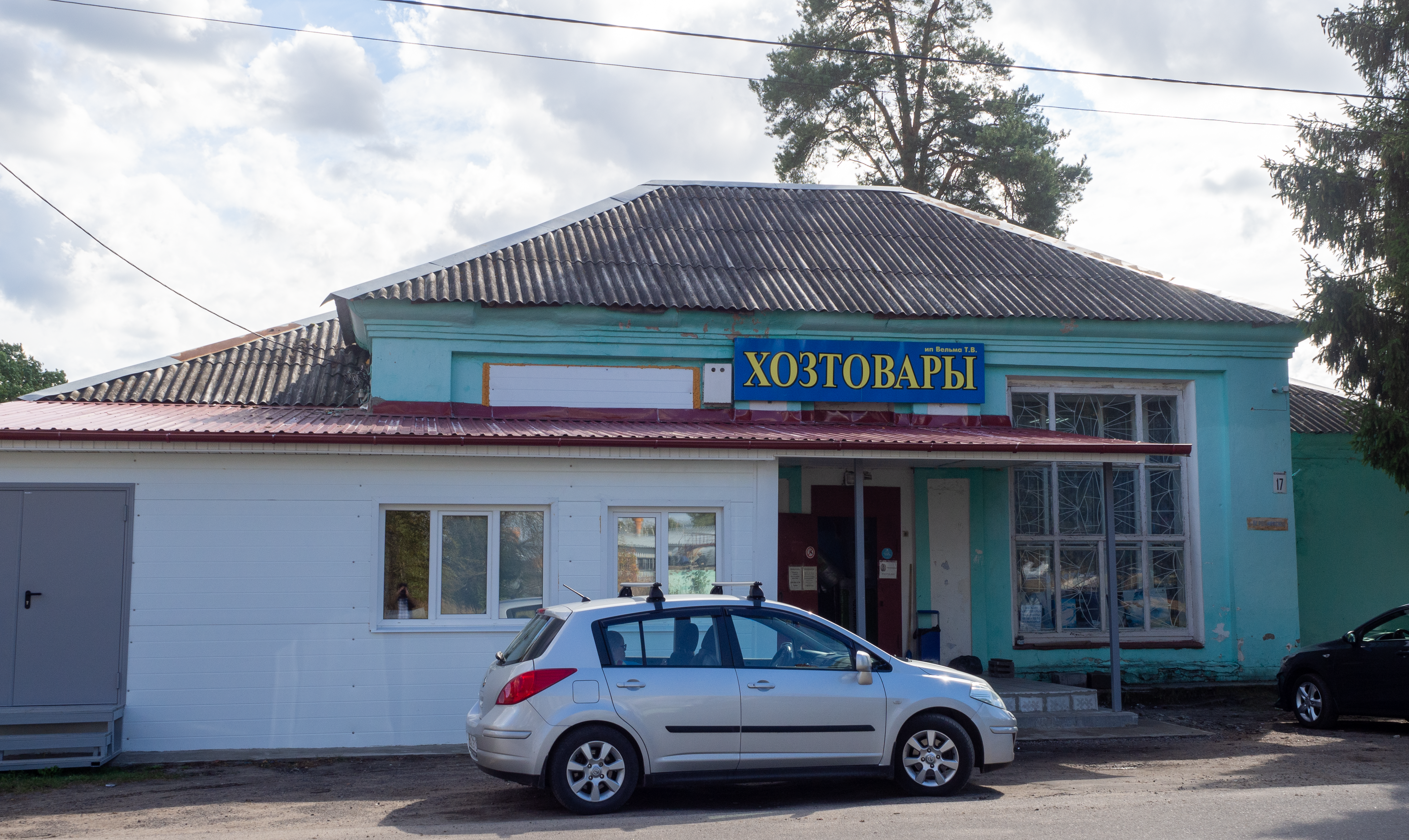
- Ryazanovsky

- Location within Moscow Oblast Location within Russia
- Coordinates: 55°7′57″N 39°33′8″E
- Country: Russia
- Region: Moscow Oblast
- District: Yegoryevsk
- Time zone: UTC+3:00

Ryazanovsky (Russian: Рязановский) is an urban locality (a work settlement) under the administrative jurisdiction of the Town of Yegoryevsk in Moscow Oblast, Russia. Population: 2,079 (2010 census); 2,324 (2002 census); 2,878 (1989 Soviet census).

== History ==
Ryazanovsky was founded in 1932. It was granted the status of an urban-type settlement in 1949.

On 8 December 2015, it was merged into the town of Yegoryevsk. On 25 September 2017, however, it was restored as a separate work settlement under the administrative jurisdiction of Yegoryevsk.
