= Bolshiye Dvory =

Bolshiye Dvory Большие Дворы
- Urban-type settlement
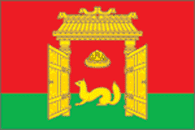
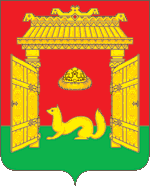
- Flag Coat of arms
- Interactive map of Bolshiye Dvory
- Location of Bolshiye Dvory Bolshiye Dvory (Moscow Oblast)
- Coordinates: 55.8129°N 38.6526°E
- Country: Russia
- Federal subject: Moscow Oblast
- Administrative district: Pavlovo-Posadsky District

Population (2010 Census)
  - Total: 4,952
  - Estimate (2025): 5,747 (+16.1%)
- Time zone: UTC+3 (MSK)
- Postal code: 142541
- OKTMO ID: 46759000056

Bolshiye Dvory (Russian: Большие Дворы) is an urban locality (an urban-type settlement) in Pavlovo-Posadsky District of Moscow Oblast, Russia. Population: 4,952 (2010 census); 4,841 (2002 census); 5,283 (1989 Soviet census).
