= Lesnoy Gorodok =

Lesnoy Gorodok Лесной Городок
- Urban-type settlement
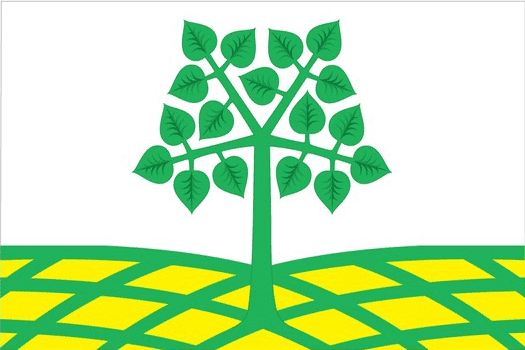
- Flag
- Interactive map of Lesnoy Gorodok
- Location of Lesnoy Gorodok Lesnoy Gorodok (Moscow Oblast)
- Coordinates: 55.6405°N 37.2075°E
- Country: Russia
- Federal subject: Moscow Oblast
- Administrative district: Odintsovsky District

Population (2010 Census)
  - Total: 7,231
  - Estimate (2025): 14,722 (+103.6%)
- Time zone: UTC+3 (MSK)
- Postal code: 143080
- OKTMO ID: 46641160051

Lesnoy Gorodok (Russian: Лесной Городок) is an urban locality (an urban-type settlement) in Odintsovsky District of Moscow Oblast, Russia. Population: 7,231 (2010 census); 5,098 (2002 census); 4,297 (1989 Soviet census).
