= Uvarovka =

Uvarovka Уваровка
- Urban-type settlement
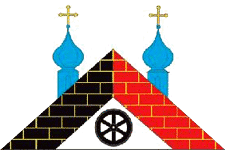
- Flag
- Interactive map of Uvarovka
- Location of Uvarovka Uvarovka (Moscow Oblast)
- Coordinates: 55.5302°N 35.6069°E
- Country: Russia
- Federal subject: Moscow Oblast
- Administrative district: Mozhaysky District
- Founded: 1860

Population (2010 Census)
  - Total: 3,354
  - Estimate (2025): 3,927 (+17.1%)
- Time zone: UTC+3 (MSK)
- Postal code: 143260
- OKTMO ID: 46633154051

Uvarovka (Russian: Уваровка) is an urban locality (an urban-type settlement) in Mozhaysky District of Moscow Oblast, Russia. Population: 3,354 (2010 census); 3,162 (2002 census); 3,675 (1989 Soviet census).
