= Mikhnevo =

Mikhnevo Михнево
- Urban-type settlement
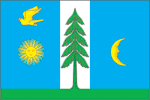
- Flag
- Interactive map of Mikhnevo
- Location of Mikhnevo Mikhnevo (Moscow Oblast)
- Coordinates: 55.1211°N 37.9600°E
- Country: Russia
- Federal subject: Moscow Oblast
- Administrative district: Stupinsky District

Population (2010 Census)
  - Total: 11,267
  - Estimate (2025): 11,310 (+0.4%)
- Time zone: UTC+3 (MSK)
- Postal code: 142840
- OKTMO ID: 46776000066

Mikhnevo (Russian: Михнёво) is an urban locality (an urban-type settlement) in Stupinsky District of Moscow Oblast, Russia. Population: 11,267 (2010 census); 10,831 (2002 census); 9,192 (1989 Soviet census).
