= Stolbovaya =

Stolbovaya Столбовая
- Urban-type settlement
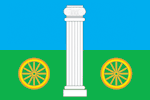
- Flag
- Interactive map of Stolbovaya
- Location of Stolbovaya Stolbovaya (Moscow Oblast)
- Coordinates: 55.2542°N 37.4889°E
- Country: Russia
- Federal subject: Moscow Oblast
- Administrative district: Chekhovsky District

Population (2010 Census)
  - Total: 5,082
  - Estimate (2025): 5,281 (+3.9%)
- Time zone: UTC+3 (MSK)
- Postal code: 142350
- OKTMO ID: 46656155051

Stolbovaya (Russian: Столбовая) is an urban locality (an urban-type settlement) in Chekhovsky District of Moscow Oblast, Russia. Population: 5,082 (2010 census); 5,185 (2002 census); 5,566 (1989 Soviet census).
