= Imeni Vorovskogo, Moscow Oblast =

Imeni Vorovskogo Имени Воровского
- Urban-type settlement
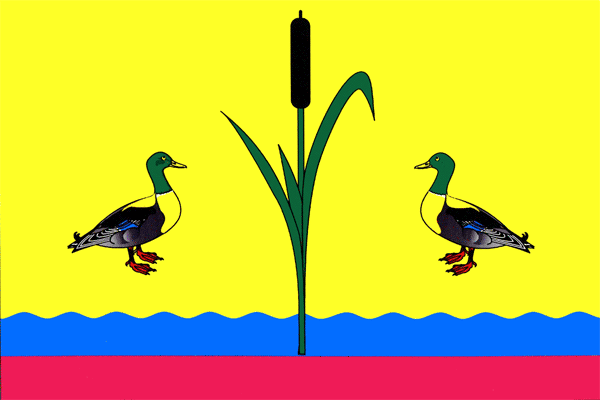
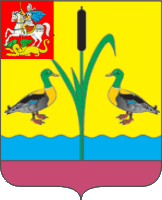
- Flag Coat of arms
- Interactive map of Imeni Vorovskogo
- Location of Imeni Vorovskogo Imeni Vorovskogo (Moscow Oblast)
- Coordinates: 55.7254°N 38.3432°E
- Country: Russia
- Federal subject: Moscow Oblast

Population (2010 Census)
  - Total: 5,120
  - Estimate (2025): 16,467 (+221.6%)
- Time zone: UTC+3 (MSK)
- Postal code: 142460
- OKTMO ID: 46751000056

Imeni Vorovskogo (Russian: Имени Воровского) is an urban locality (an urban-type settlement) in Moscow Oblast, Russia. It was named after the first Soviet diplomat Vatslav Vorovsky. Population: 16,127 (2021 census); 5,120 (2010 census); 5,347 (2002 census); 5,272 (1989 Soviet census).
