= Ramensky District =

Ramensky District Раменский район (Russian)
- District
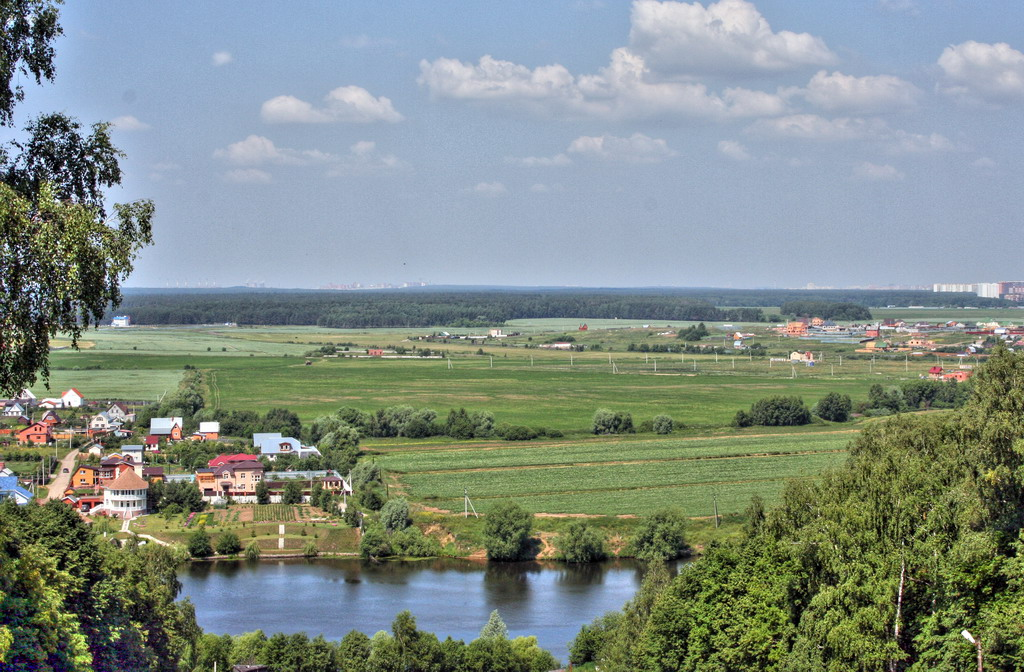
- Borovky Kurgan, Ramensky District

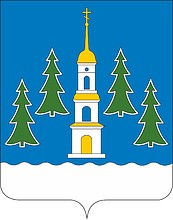
- Flag Coat of arms
- Location of Ramensky District in Moscow Oblast (before July 2012)
- Coordinates: 55°34′N 38°13′E
- Country: Russia
- Federal subject: Moscow Oblast
- Administrative center: Ramenskoye

Area
  - Total: 1,397.46 km^{2} (539.56 sq mi)

Population (2010 Census)
  - Total: 256,375
  - Density: 183.458/km^{2} (475.154/sq mi)
  - Urban: 56.8%
  - Rural: 43.2%

Administrative structure
  - Administrative divisions: 1 Towns, 5 Work settlements and suburban settlements, 15 Rural settlements
  - Inhabited localities: 1 cities/towns, 5 urban-type settlements, 232 rural localities

Municipal structure
  - Municipally incorporated as: Ramensky Municipal District
  - Municipal divisions: 6 urban settlements, 15 rural settlements
- Time zone: UTC+3 (MSK)
- OKTMO ID: 46648000
- Website: http://www.ramenskoye.ru/

Ramensky District (Russian: Ра́менский райо́н) is an administrative and municipal district (raion), one of the thirty-six in Moscow Oblast, Russia. It is located in the southeastern central part of the oblast. The area of the district is 1,397.46 square kilometers (539.56 sq mi). Its administrative center is the town of Ramenskoye. Population: 256,375 (2010 Census); 217,939 (2002 census); 153,215 (1989 Soviet census). The population of Ramenskoye accounts for 66.2% of the district's total population.

Historical population
Year	Pop.	±%
1939	160,795	—
1970	151,630	−5.7%
1979	150,626	−0.7%
1989	153,215	+1.7%
2002	217,939	+42.2%
2010	256,375	+17.6%
2021	331,584	+29.3%
Source: Census data

The cities of Zhukovsky and Bronnitsy with localities under their jurisdictions, while surrounded by the district's territory, are administratively and municipally separate from it (Zhukovsky since 1952 and Bronnitsy since 1992).
