= Voskresensk, Moscow Oblast =

Town in Moscow Oblast, Russia

Voskresensk Воскресенск
- Town
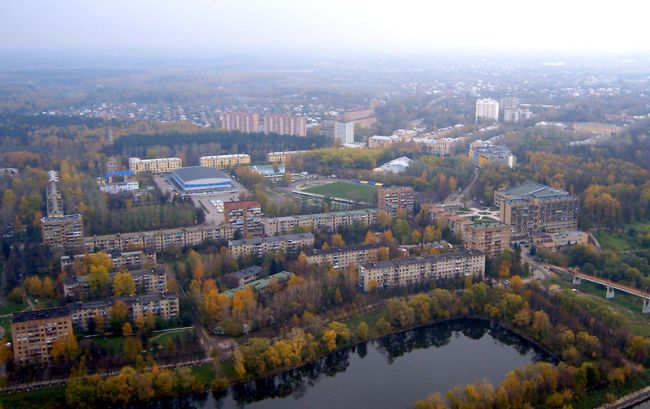
- View of Voskresensk

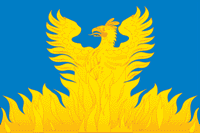
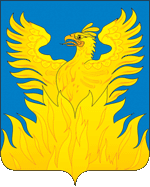
- Flag Coat of arms
- Interactive map of Voskresensk
- Location of Voskresensk Voskresensk (Moscow Oblast)
- Coordinates: 55°19′N 38°42′E
- Country: Russia
- Federal subject: Moscow Oblast
- Administrative district: Voskresensky District
- TownSelsoviet: Voskresensk
- Founded: 1862
- Town status since: 1938
- Elevation: 120 m (390 ft)

Population (2010 Census)
  - Total: 91,464
  - Estimate (2025): 95,347 (+4.2%)
  - Rank: 180th in 2010

Administrative status
  - Capital of: Voskresensky District, Town of Voskresensk

Municipal status
  - Municipal district: Voskresensky Municipal District
  - Urban settlement: Voskresensk Urban Settlement
  - Capital of: Voskresensky Municipal District, Voskresensk Urban Settlement
- Time zone: UTC+3 (MSK)
- Postal codes: 140200–140209, 140215, 140216, 140259
- Dialing code: +7 49644
- OKTMO ID: 46710000001
- Website: www.vosgoradmin.ru

Voskresensk (Russian: Воскресе́нск) is a town and the administrative center of Voskresensky District in Moscow Oblast, Russia, located upon the banks of the Moskva River 88 kilometers (55 mi) southeast of Moscow. Population: 95,495 (2021 census); 91,464 (2010 census); 77,871 (2002 census); 80,393 (1989 Soviet census).

== History ==
It was founded in 1862. Town status was granted to it in 1938.

== Administrative and municipal status ==
Within the framework of administrative divisions, Voskresensk serves as the administrative center of Voskresensky District. As an administrative division, it is, together with four rural localities, incorporated within Voskresensky District as the Town of Voskresensk. As a municipal division, the Town of Voskresensk is incorporated within Voskresensky Municipal District as Voskresensk Urban Settlement.

== Transportation ==
There are station Voskresensk and stop platform 88 km at the Moscow-Ryazan line.

== Notable residents ==
The town is home to several prominent ice hockey players, including Igor Larionov and other Soviet national team players, such as Vyacheslav Kozlov, Valeri Kamensky, Andrei Lomakin, Aleksandr Smirnov, Vladimir Golikov, Aleksandr Golikov, Alexander Ragulin, German Titov, Igor Ulanov, Sergei Berezin, Dmitri Kvartalnov, Roman Oksiuta, Andrei Markov, Andrei Loktionov, and Valeri Zelepukin. Current Russian NHL players from Voskresensk include Vladislav Namestnikov.
