= Voskresensky District, Moscow Oblast =

Voskresensky District Воскресенский район (Russian)
- District
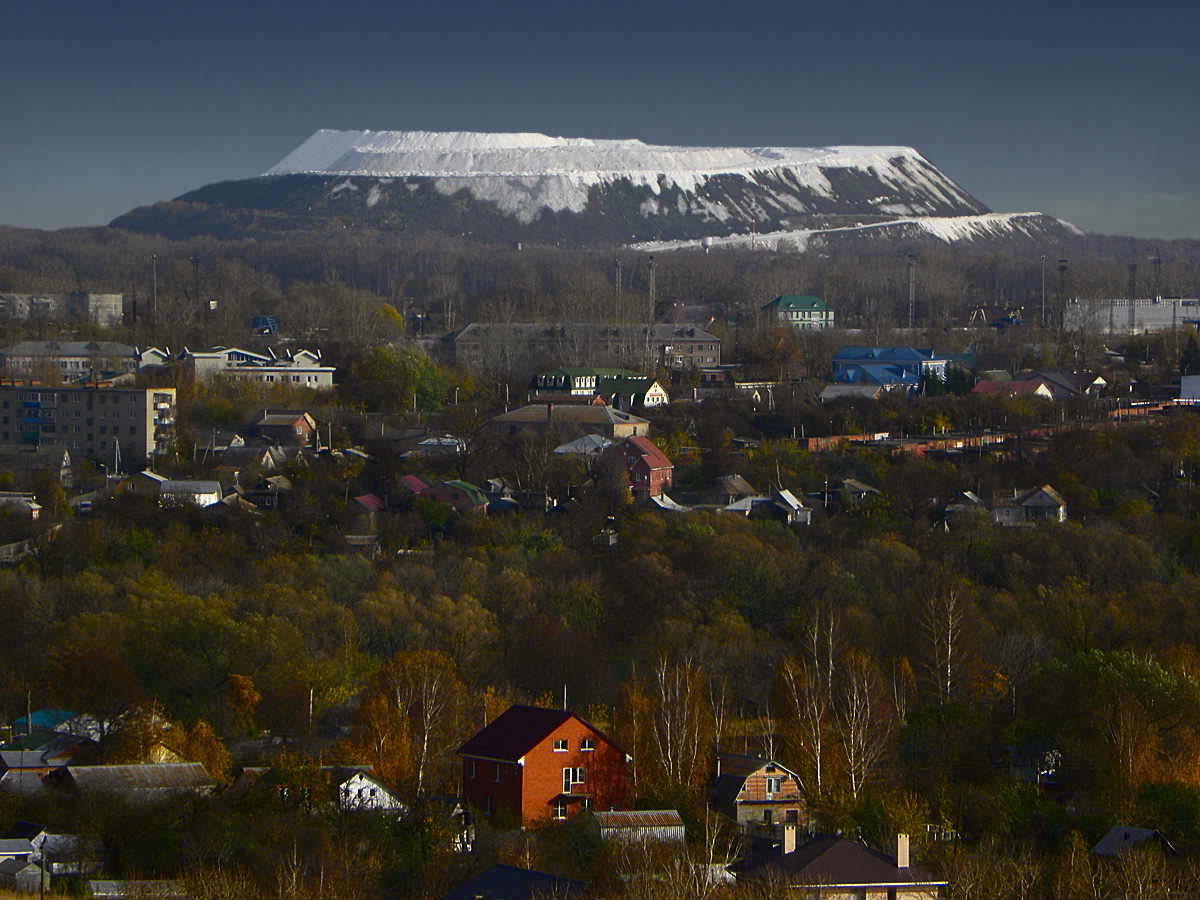
- Belaya Mountain, Voskresensky District

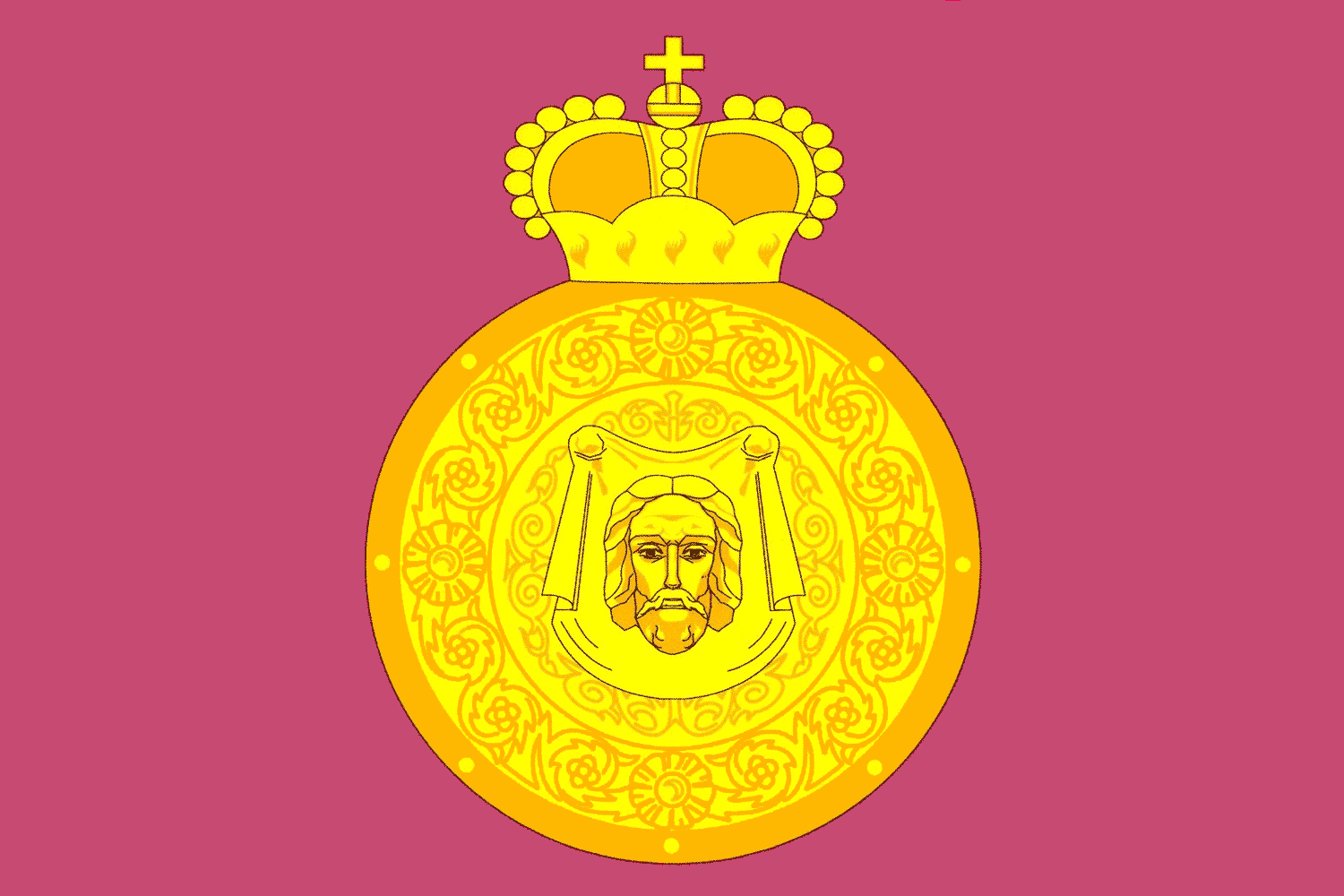
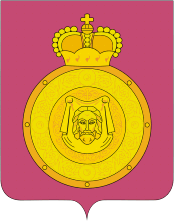
- Flag Coat of arms
- Location of Voskresensky District in Moscow Oblast (before July 2012)
- Coordinates: 55°19′N 38°42′E
- Country: Russia
- Federal subject: Moscow Oblast
- Established: 12 July 1929
- Administrative center: Voskresensk

Area
  - Total: 812.480 km^{2} (313.700 sq mi)

Population (2010 Census)
  - Total: 153,600
  - Density: 189.1/km^{2} (489.6/sq mi)
  - Urban: 79.1%
  - Rural: 20.9%

Administrative structure
  - Administrative divisions: 1 Towns, 3 Work settlements, 2 Rural settlements
  - Inhabited localities: 1 cities/towns, 3 urban-type settlements, 79 rural localities

Municipal structure
  - Municipally incorporated as: Voskresensky Municipal District
  - Municipal divisions: 4 urban settlements, 2 rural settlements
- Website: http://www.vmr-mo.ru/

Voskresensky District (Russian: Воскре́сенский райо́н) is an administrative and municipal district (raion), one of the thirty-six in Moscow Oblast, Russia. It is located in the east of the oblast. The area of the district is 812.480 square kilometers (313.700 sq mi). Its administrative center is the town of Voskresensk. Population: 153,600 (2010 Census); 152,761 (2002 census); 77,573 (1989 Soviet census). The population of Voskresensk accounts for 59.5% of the district's total population.
