= Pushkinsky District, Moscow Oblast =

Pushkinsky District Пушкинский район (Russian)
- District
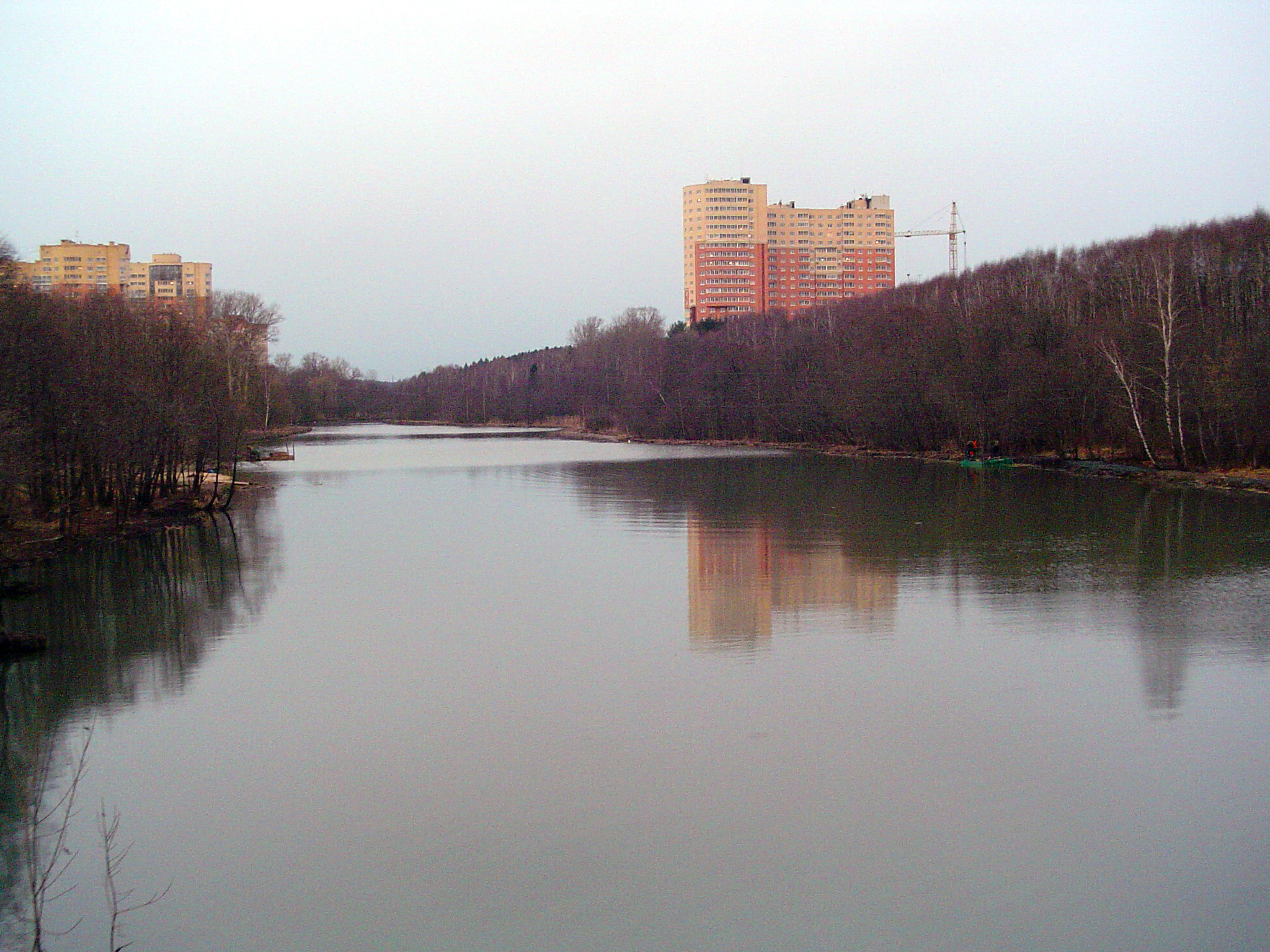
- The Serebryanka River in the city of Pushkino, Pushkinsky District

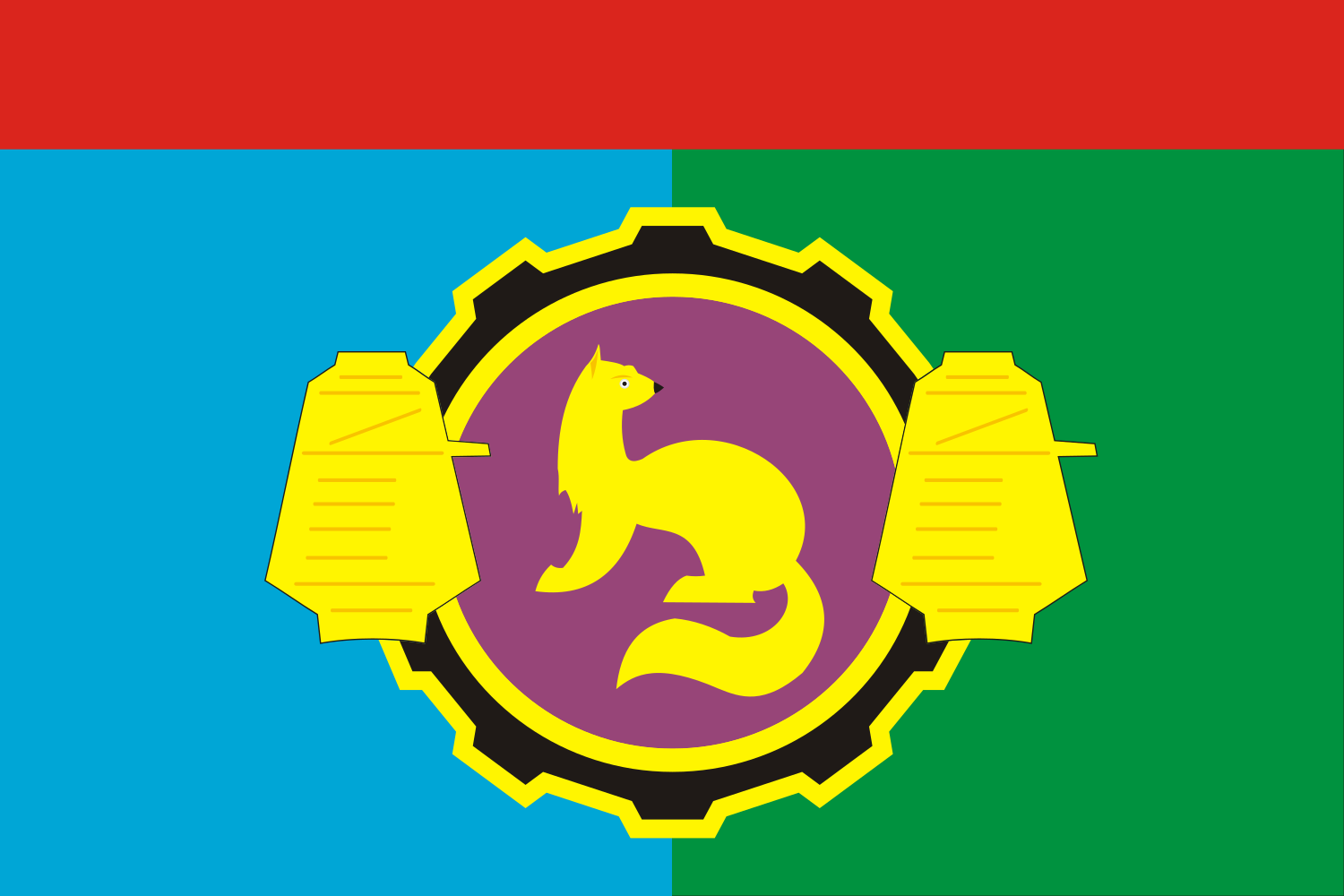
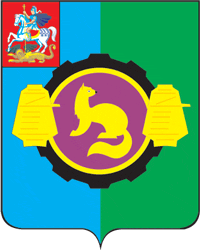
- Flag Coat of arms
- Location of Pushkinsky District in Moscow Oblast (before July 2012)
- Coordinates: 56°00′N 37°50′E
- Country: Russia
- Federal subject: Moscow Oblast
- Administrative center: Pushkino

Area
  - Total: 571.47 km^{2} (220.65 sq mi)

Population (2010 Census)
  - Total: 177,510
  - Density: 310.62/km^{2} (804.50/sq mi)
  - Urban: 86.7%
  - Rural: 13.3%

Administrative structure
  - Administrative divisions: 1 Towns, 6 Work settlements and suburban settlements, 3 Rural settlements
  - Inhabited localities: 1 cities/towns, 6 urban-type settlements, 81 rural localities

Municipal structure
  - Municipally incorporated as: Pushkinsky Municipal District
  - Municipal divisions: 7 urban settlements, 3 rural settlements
- Time zone: UTC+3 (MSK)
- OKTMO ID: 46758
- Website: http://www.adm-pushkino.ru

Pushkinsky District (Russian: Пу́шкинский райо́н) is an administrative and municipal district (raion), one of the thirty-six in Moscow Oblast, Russia. It is located in the northern central part of the oblast. The area of the district is 571.47 square kilometers (220.65 sq mi). Its administrative center is the city of Pushkino. Population: 177,510 (2010 Census); 163,439 (2002 census); 123,630 (1989 Soviet census). The population of Pushkino accounts for 58.0% of the district's total population.

== Notable residents ==
- Konstantin Kosachev (born 1962), politician and former diplomat
- Ivan Skvortsov-Stepanov (1870–1928), Bolshevik revolutionary and Soviet politician
