= Lopasnya =

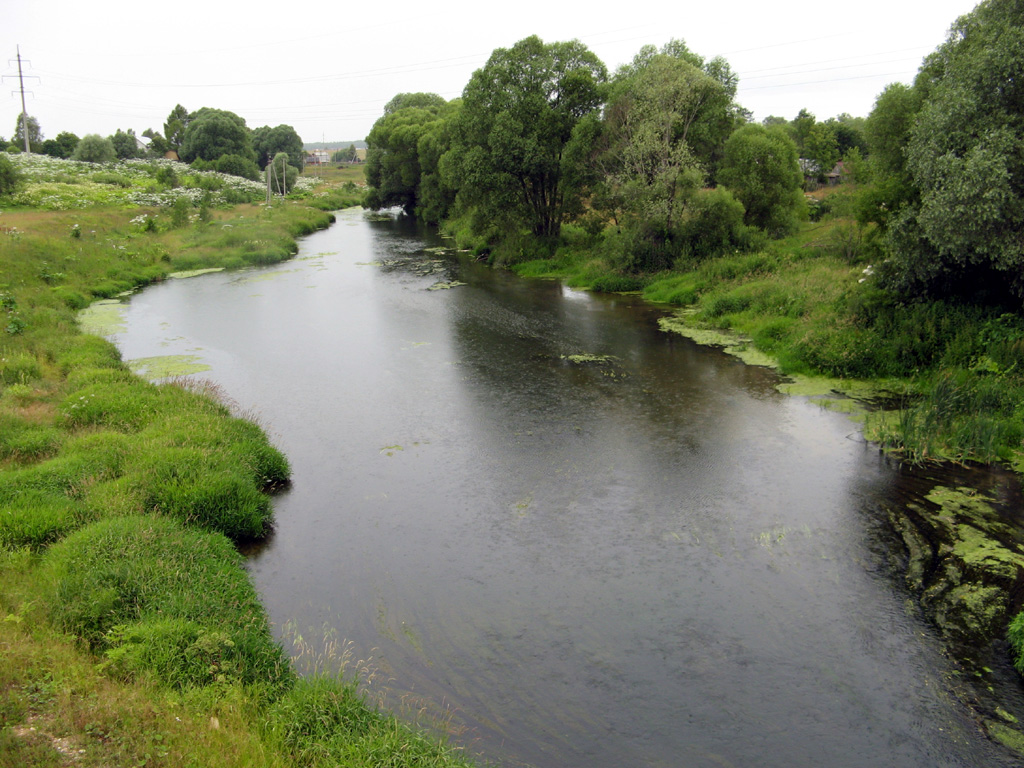
- Lopasnya at Chekhov
- Native name: Лопасня (Russian)

Location
- Country: Russia

Physical characteristics
- Mouth: Oka
  - coordinates: 54.8427°N 37.8500°E
- Length: 108 km (67 mi)
- Basin size: 1,090 km^{2} (420 sq mi)

Basin features
- Progression: Oka→ Volga→ Caspian Sea

The Lopasnya (Russian: Лопа́сня) is a river in Moscow Oblast in Russia. It is a left tributary of the Oka. It is 108 km in length, with a drainage basin of 1090 km². Its average discharge is 6,76 m³/s.
