= Moscow Oblast =

First-level administrative division of Russia

Moscow Oblast Московская область (Russian)
- Oblast
- Flag Coat of arms

- Coordinates: 55°42′N 36°58′E
- Country: Russia
- Federal district: Central
- Economic region: Central
- Established: January 14, 1929
- Administrative center: Moscow and Krasnogorsk

Government
  - Body: Oblast Duma
  - Governor: Andrey Vorobyov

Area
  - Total: 44,329 km^{2} (17,116 sq mi)
  - Rank: 55th

Population (2021 census)
  - Total: 8,524,665 ▲
  - Estimate (2018): 7,503,385
  - Rank: 2nd
  - Density: 192.30/km^{2} (498.07/sq mi)
  - Urban: 78.5%
  - Rural: 21.5%

GDP (nominal, 2024)
  - Total: ₽10.88 trillion (US$127.7 billion)
  - Per capita: ₽1.25 million (US$14,656.25)
- Time zone: UTC+3 (MSK)
- ISO 3166 code: RU-MOS
- License plates: 50, 90, 150, 190, 750, 790, 550, 250
- OKTMO ID: 46000000
- Official languages: Russian
- Website: mosreg.ru

Moscow Oblast (Note: Russian: Московская область, romanized: Moskovskaya oblastʹ, IPA: [mɐˈskofskəjə ˈobləsʲtʲ]), informally known as Podmoskovye (Note: Подмосковье, IPA: [pədmɐˈskovʲjə]), is a federal subject of Russia (an oblast). With a population of 8,524,665 (2021 Census) living in an area of 44,300 square kilometers (17,100 sq mi), it is one of the most densely populated regions in the country and is the second most populous federal subject. The oblast has no official administrative center; its public authorities are located in Moscow and Krasnogorsk (the Moscow Oblast Duma and the local government), and also across other locations in the oblast.

Located in European Russia between latitudes 54° and 57° N and longitudes 35° and 41° E, Moscow Oblast borders Tver Oblast in the northwest, Yaroslavl Oblast in the north, Vladimir Oblast in the northeast and east, Ryazan Oblast in the southeast, Tula Oblast in the south, Kaluga Oblast in the southwest, and Smolensk Oblast in the west. The oblast mostly surrounds the federal city of Moscow, which is not part of the oblast, but rather a separate federal subject in its own right. The oblast is highly industrialized, with the major industries being metallurgy, oil refining, and mechanical engineering, along with food, energy, and chemical industries.

== Geography ==
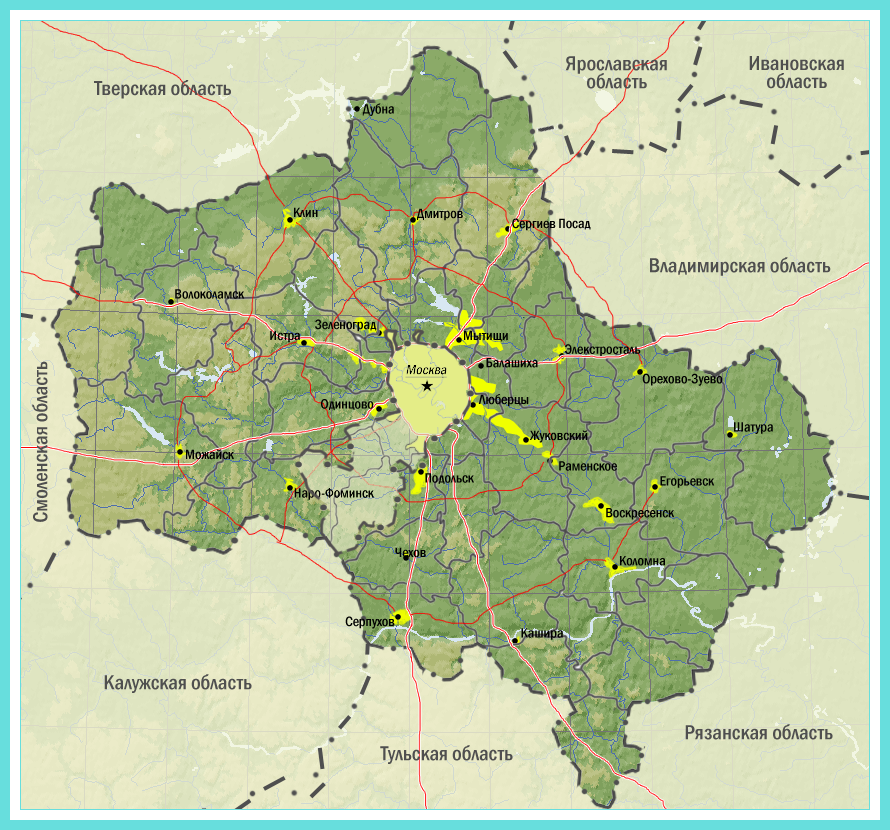
Map of Moscow Oblast and the federal city of Moscow

=== Relief ===
The oblast is mostly flat, with some hills with a height of about 160 meters (520 ft) in the western and extensive lowlands in the eastern part. From the southwest to northeast, the oblast is crossed by the border of the Moscow glacier to the north of the common ice-erosion form with moraine ridges, and to the south are only erosional landforms. The western and northern parts of the oblast contain the Moscow Uplands. Their average height peaks at about 300 meters (980 ft) near Dmitrov and the upper point of 310 meters (1,020 ft) lies near the village of Shapkino in Mozhaysky District. The northern part of the Moscow Uplands is steeper than the southern part. The uplands contain lakes of glacial origin, such as Lakes Nerskoye and Krugloye. To the north of the Moscow Uplands lies the alluvial Verhnevolzhsk Depression; It is marshy and flat with the height varying between about 120 meters (390 ft) and 150 meters (490 ft).

To the south stretches a hilly area of the Moskvoretsko-Oksk plain. Its greatest height of 254 meters (833 ft) lies in the area of Tyoply Stan, within the Moscow city limits. The plain has clearly defined river valleys, especially in the south parts, and occasional karst relief, mostly in Serpukhovsky District. In the extreme south, after the Oka River, lies the Central Russian Upland. It contains numerous gullies and ravines and has average height above 200 m with the maximum of 236 m near Pushchino.

Most of the eastern part of Moscow Oblast is taken by the vast Meshchera Lowlands with much wetland in their eastern part. Their highest hill peaks at 214 meters (702 ft) but the average heights are 120–150 meters (390–490 ft). Most lakes of the lowlands, such as Lakes Chyornoye and Svyatoye, are of glacial origin. Here lies the lowest natural elevation of the region, the water level of Oka River at 97 meters (318 ft).

=== Geology and minerals ===
==== Geology ====
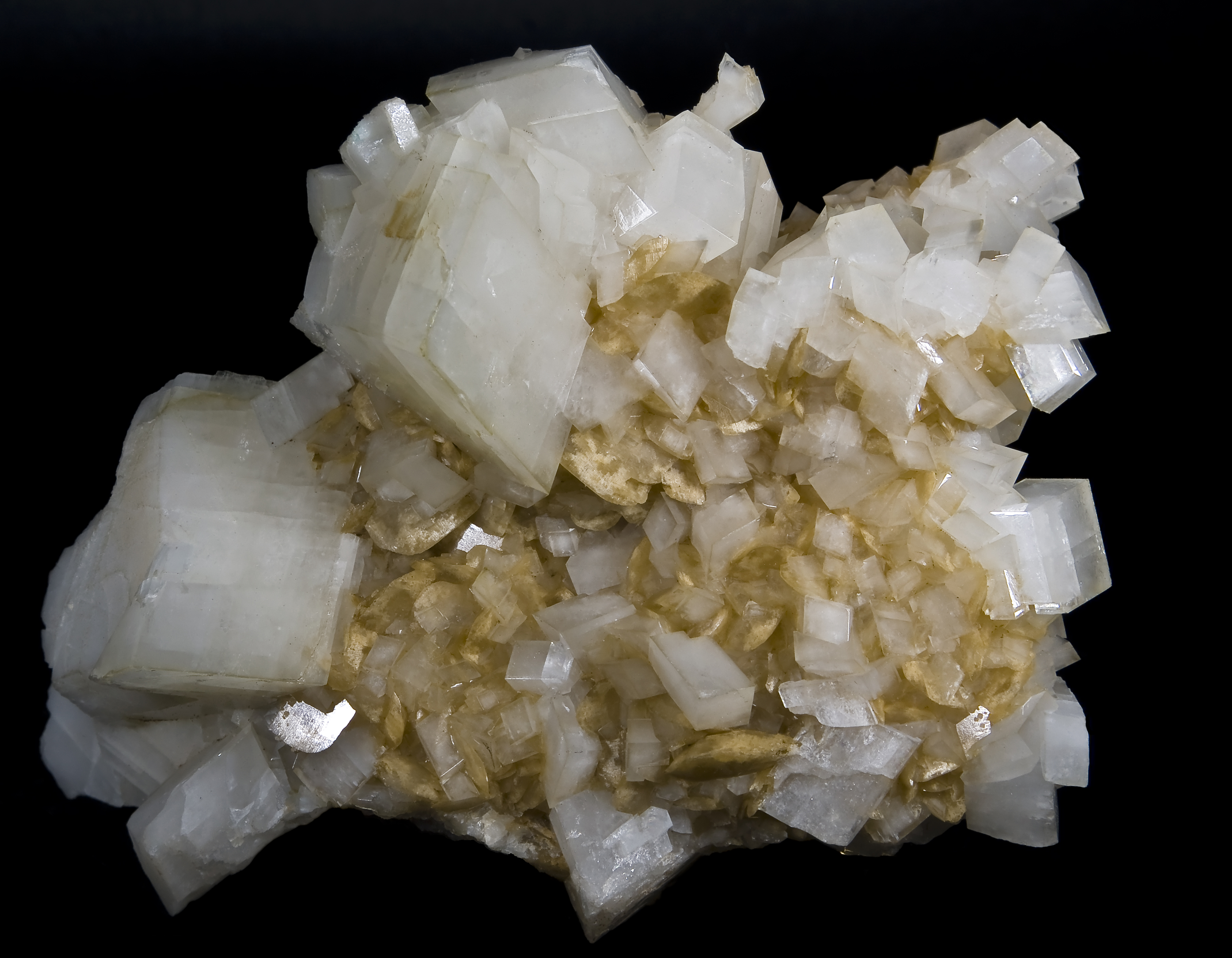
Dolomite

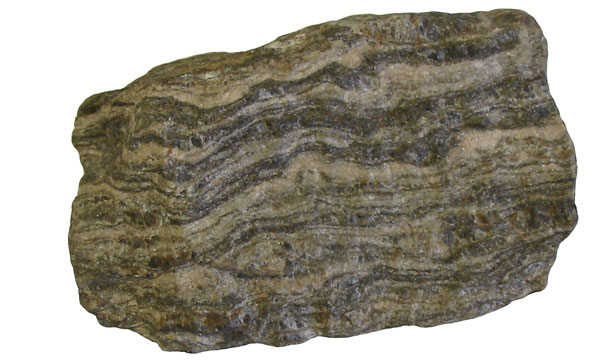
Gneiss

Moscow Oblast is located in the central part of the East European craton. Like all cratons, the latter is composed of the crystalline basement and sedimentary cover. The basement consists of Archaean and Proterozoic rocks and the cover is deposited in the Palaeozoic, Mesozoic and Cenozoic eras. The lowest depth of the basement (1,000 meters (3,300 ft)) is to the south of Serebryanye Prudy, in the very south area of the oblast, and the largest (4,200 meters (13,800 ft)) is to the east of Sergiyev Posad, in the northeast region.

Tertiary deposits are almost absent within the oblast. Significantly more abundant are deposits of the Carboniferous and Jurassic periods. In the Cretaceous period, a sea was covering Moscow Oblast, as evidenced by phosphate deposits and a variety of sands. Cretaceous sediments are most common in the north of the oblast. The sea was wider in Jurassic than in Cretaceous period. Typical Jurassic deposits, in the form of black clay, are found within and around the city of Moscow and in the valley of the Moscow River. Carboniferous deposits in Moscow Oblast are represented by dolomite, limestone, and marl. Coal deposits rich in organic remains occur in the south, especially in Serpukhovsky District, and in the western regions. Devonian deposits were also found within the region.

Quaternary deposits are widely distributed in Moscow Oblast; their thickness decreases from the northwest to southeast. It is believed that there were four glaciations in the area. The first occurred in the Lower Pleistocene and spread to the east–west part of the Oka River valley, it left almost no trace in the region. In the Middle Pleistocene, there were two powerful glaciations. The Dnieper glacier covered a large part of the Russian Plain, whereas the Moscow glaciation stopped just south of the present city of Moscow. The last glaciation, the Valdai glaciation, occurred in the Late Pleistocene; it did not directly affect the territory of Moscow Oblast, but left traces in the form of fluvioglacial deposits, mainly in the north area. The glaciers left behind a moraine loam with pebbles and boulders of various rocks, such as granite, gneiss, quartzite, dolomite, limestone and sandstone. Its thickness varies between a few meters at watersheds and 100 m at moraine ridges.

==== Minerals ====
Moscow Oblast is rich in minerals. Sands from the sediments of different periods (mainly Quaternary and Cretaceous) are of high quality and are widely used in construction. Quartz sand (milled quartz) is used in the glass industry, their production is conducted from the end of 17th century near Lyubertsy. Much of the production is currently halted due to environmental concerns, and only the Yeganovskoye field is being exploited; its silica sand reserves are 33 million tonnes and annual production reaches 675,000 tonnes. Sand and gravel deposits are abundant within the Smolensk-Moscow Upland. Sandstone deposits are developed in Klinsky and Dmitrovsky Districts.

There are numerous clay deposits within the oblast; fusible clay is excavated in Sergiyev Posad. The Yeldiginskoye field near the village of Sofrino has reserves estimated at 30 million cubic meters; its annual production reaches 600,000 cubic meters (21,000,000 cu ft). Refractory white clay occurs in the eastern region, in the Carboniferous and Jurassic sediments, and is extracted from the 14th century near Gzhel. The largest (Kudinovskoye) deposit is near the town of Elektrougli with the reserves of 3 billion tonnes. Also widespread are loams which are used in brick manufacture and limestones ("white stone"). The famous Myachkovo deposit of carboniferous limestone provided material that went for cladding of such buildings in Moscow as the Bolshoi Theater. The mining in Myachkovo had been stopped and currently, limestone is provided by the quarries of Podolsky, Voskresensky, and Kolomensky Districts. The latter district also provides marble-like limestone.

Other industrial minerals of Moscow Oblast are dolomite, limestone tuff, and marl; mostly in the southern and eastern parts. Dolomite is used in the cement industry. Its mining is concentrated mainly near Shchyolkovo, the reserves exceed 20 million tonnes and the annual production is about 650 tonnes.

Phosphates are produced in the Yegorevskoye and Severskoye fields. Meshchera and Verkhnevolzhsk Lowlands are rich in peat. The largest mines are "Ryazanovskoe" (840,000 tonnes per year) and "Radovitsky moss" (760,000 tonnes per year), both around Yegoryevsk. There are deposits of brown coal beyond the Oka River, but they have no commercial value. There are also minor deposits of titanium and iron ore in Serpukhovsky and Serebryano-Prudsky Districts.

Salts of potassium salt are being developed around Serpukhov and Yegoryevsk. There are also numerous mineral springs near Zvenigorod, Klin, and Serpukhov. They include surface springs and reservoirs at the depth of 300–500 meters (980–1,640 ft). Deeper, at 1–1.5 kilometers (0.62–0.93 mi) there is a large sea of salt extending beyond Moscow Oblast. Waters with the salt concentration up to 300 g/L are used in the local food industry and spas.

=== Climate ===
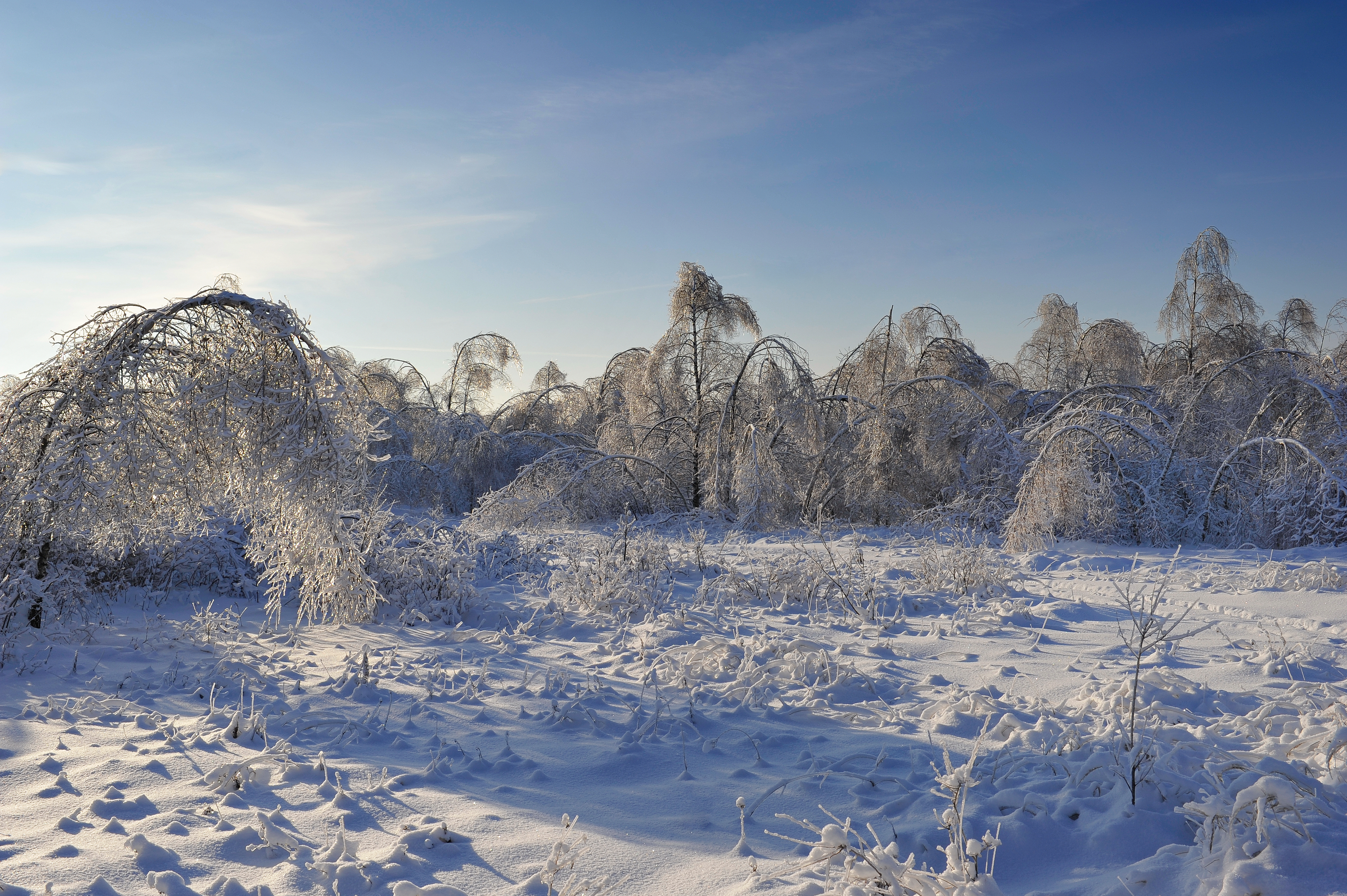
In winter

The climate of Moscow Oblast is humid continental, with clearly expressed seasonality – short but warm summers and long, cold winters; the continentality increases from northwest to southeast. The period of the average temperature below 0 °C (32 °F) lasts 130–150 days, beginning in early or mid-November and ending in late March (or very early April). The average annual temperature varies from +3.5 °C (38.3 °F) to +5.5 °C (41.9 °F). The coldest months are January and February with the average temperature of −9 °C (16 °F) in the west and −12 °C (10 °F) in the east. With the arrival of arctic air, the temperature drops to below −20 °C (−4 °F) that may last up to twenty days during the winter, with the temperatures reaching −45 °C (−49 °F). The minimum temperature of −54 °C (−65 °F) was observed in Naro-Fominsk. Thaws often occur in December and February due to the Atlantic, and rarely the Mediterranean cyclones. The thaws usually last several days, and their total number from November to March can reach fifty. Snow starts accumulating in November, though sometimes in late October or early December, and disappears in mid-April (sometimes in late March). The snow depth is 25–50 centimeters (9.8–19.7 in) and the soil freezes to 65–75 centimeters (26–30 in). The warmest month is July with the average temperature of +18.0 °C (64.4 °F) in the northwest and +20.0 °C (68.0 °F) in the southeast. The maximum temperature of +40 °C (104 °F) was recorded in Kolomna during 2010 Northern Hemisphere summer heat waves. The average annual rainfall is 450–650 millimeters (18–26 in), the precipitation is maximal in the northwestern and minimal in the southeastern regions. The summer precipitation is usually 75 millimeters (3.0 in), but severe droughts occur once in 25–30 years, with less than 5 millimeters (0.20 in) of rain over June–August.

Climate data for Moscow Oblast
Month	Jan	Feb	Mar	Apr	May	Jun	Jul	Aug	Sep	Oct	Nov	Dec	Year
Mean daily maximum °C (°F)	−6 (21)	−5 (23)	1 (34)	11 (52)	18 (64)	22 (72)	25 (77)	23 (73)	16 (61)	8 (46)	2 (36)	−4 (25)	9.8 (49.6)
Daily mean °C (°F)	−10 (14)	−10 (14)	−4 (25)	6 (43)	13 (55)	17 (63)	19 (66)	17 (63)	11 (52)	5 (41)	−2 (28)	−7 (19)	6.3 (43.3)
Mean daily minimum °C (°F)	−14 (7)	−15 (5)	−9 (16)	1 (34)	8 (46)	12 (54)	13 (55)	11 (52)	6 (43)	1 (34)	−6 (21)	−11 (12)	2.8 (37.0)
Source: protown.ru

=== Rivers and lakes ===
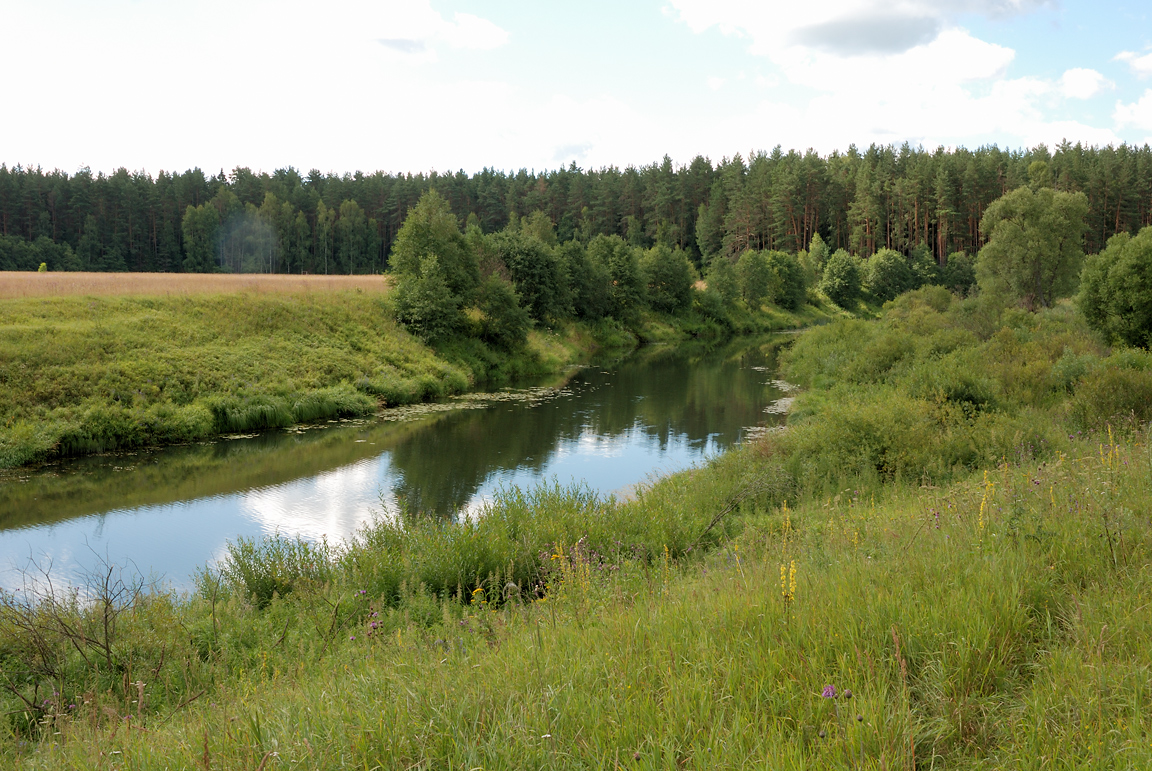
The Shosha River near the selo of Mikulino

There are more than three hundred rivers with the length above 10 kilometers (6.2 mi) in Moscow Oblast. All rivers are calm and have well-developed valleys and floodplains. They are mostly fed by melting snow and the flood falls on April–May. The water level is low in summer and increases only with heavy rain. The rivers freeze over from late November until mid-April. The only navigable rivers are the Volga, the Oka, and the Moskva River.

Most rivers belong to the basin of the Volga, which itself only crosses a small part in the north of Moscow Oblast, near the border with Tver Oblast. The second largest river of the region is the Oka. The northern part of Moscow Oblast includes such Volga tributaries as the Shosha, the Lama, the Dubna, the Sestra, and the Yakhroma. On the south flow the tributaries of the Oka, including the Nara, the Protva, and the Lopasnya Rivers. The Moskva River, which almost entirely flows within the oblast, also belongs to the Oka basin. The eastern and northeastern regions, including much of Meschersk Depression, are irrigated by the tributaries of the Klyazma River, which itself is a main tributary of the Oka.

The Moscow Canal crosses the northern part of Moscow Oblast through the Ikshinskyoe, Klyazminskoye, Pyalovskoye, and Pestovskoye Reservoirs. In the basin of the Moskva River, there are also Ozerninskoye, Mozhayskoye, Istrinskoye, and Ruza Reservoirs, providing Moscow with drinking water.

There are about 350 lakes in the oblast, almost all are shallow (5–10 m) and many are of glacial origin. The largest are Lake Dubovoye (11.8 square kilometers (4.6 sq mi)) and Svyatoye (11.6 square kilometers (4.5 sq mi)) whereas the deepest (32 meters (105 ft)) is Lake Glubokoye in Ruzsky District. There are also many marshes, especially within the Meshchersk and Verkhnevolzhsk lowlands.

=== Soils ===
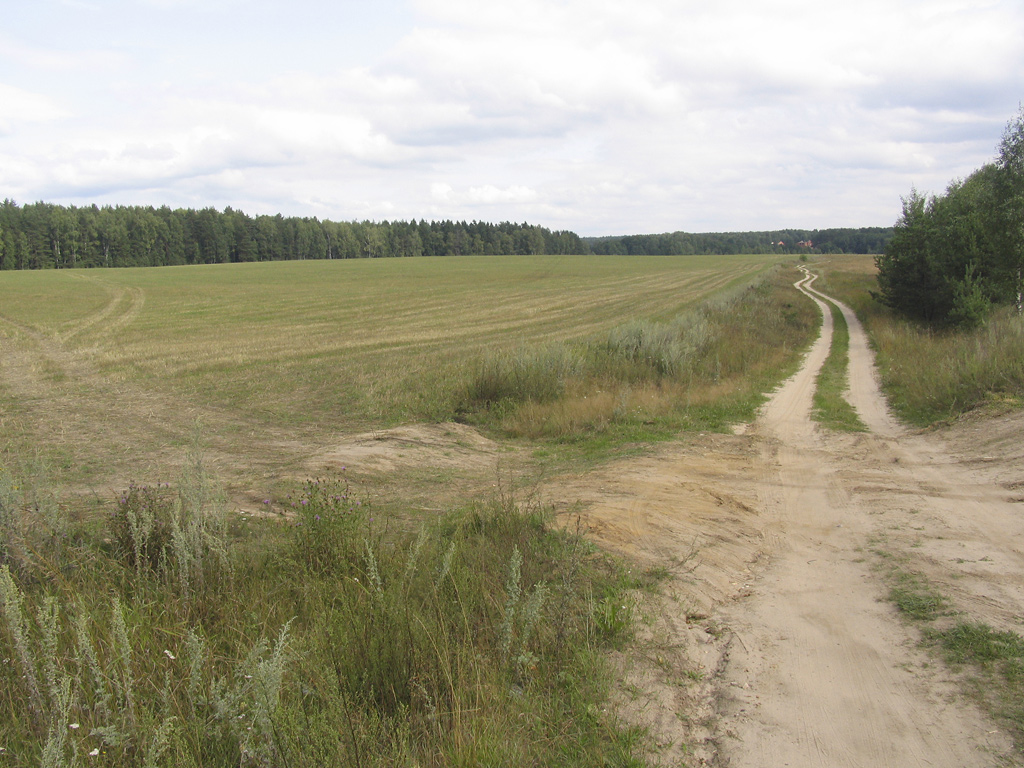
A typical landscape of Moscow Oblast

The oblast is dominated by relatively infertile podsol soils which require fertilizers for commercial agriculture. On the hills there is more loam and the low-lying areas have more of bog, sandy loam and sand. Chernozem is scarce and occurs only south of the Oka River. Gray forest soils are spread between the Oka, Moskva, and Klyazma Rivers, mostly in Ramensky and Voskresensky Districts. Marshy soils are common in Meshchersk and Verkhnevolzhsk lowlands. Valleys of large rivers are rich in alluvial soils. In general, soils are heavily polluted with chemical fertilizers, pesticides, and household and industrial waste, especially around Moscow, Orekhovo-Zuyevo, Noginsk, and Voskresensk.

=== Flora ===
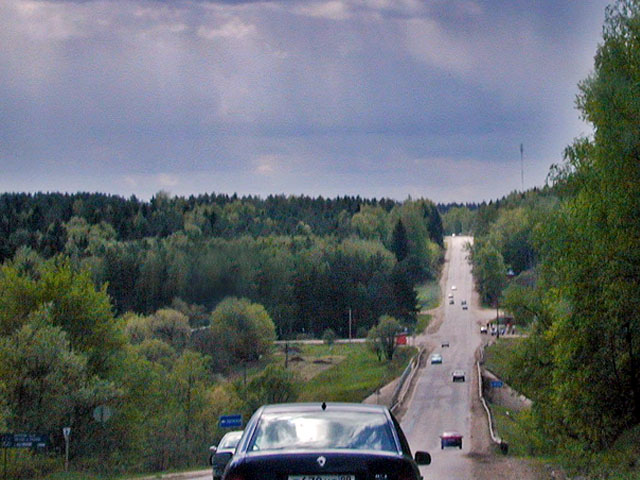
The small highway ring around Moscow

Moscow Oblast lies within the zone of forests and steppes with forests covering over 40% of the region. Coniferous (mainly pine) trees dominate the northern (Verkhnevolzhsk lowlands) and western parts (Mozhaysky, Lotoshinsky, and Shakhovsky Districts). Forests of Meshchora consist primarily of pine; in waterlogged lowlands, there are individual alder forests. Central and eastern regions have coniferous-deciduous forests with the main tree species of Norway spruce, Scots pine, birch, and aspen often mixed with bushes of hazel. To the south lies the subzone of broad-leaved forests of oak, lime, maple and elm. Moscow-Oka Upland is the transition zone which is dominated by spruce, for example, in the upper reaches of the Lopasnya River. Valleys of the Oka are covered in pine forests of the steppe type and the far south regions (Serebryano-Prudsky and partially Serpukhovsky Districts) are cultivated steppes with occasional lime and oak groves.

The intensive cutting of Moscow region forests in the 18–19th centuries reduced them and changed their species; conifers were replaced by birch and aspen. There is almost no logging nowadays and the forests are being restored, especially around Moscow.

Swamps are prevalent in the eastern areas, such as Shatursky and Lukhovitsky Districts. The natural floodplain meadows are almost gone. The number of native plant species is reduced, but some introduced foreign species flourish, such as sugar maple. Native species include water caltrop and lady's slipper orchid.

=== Fauna ===
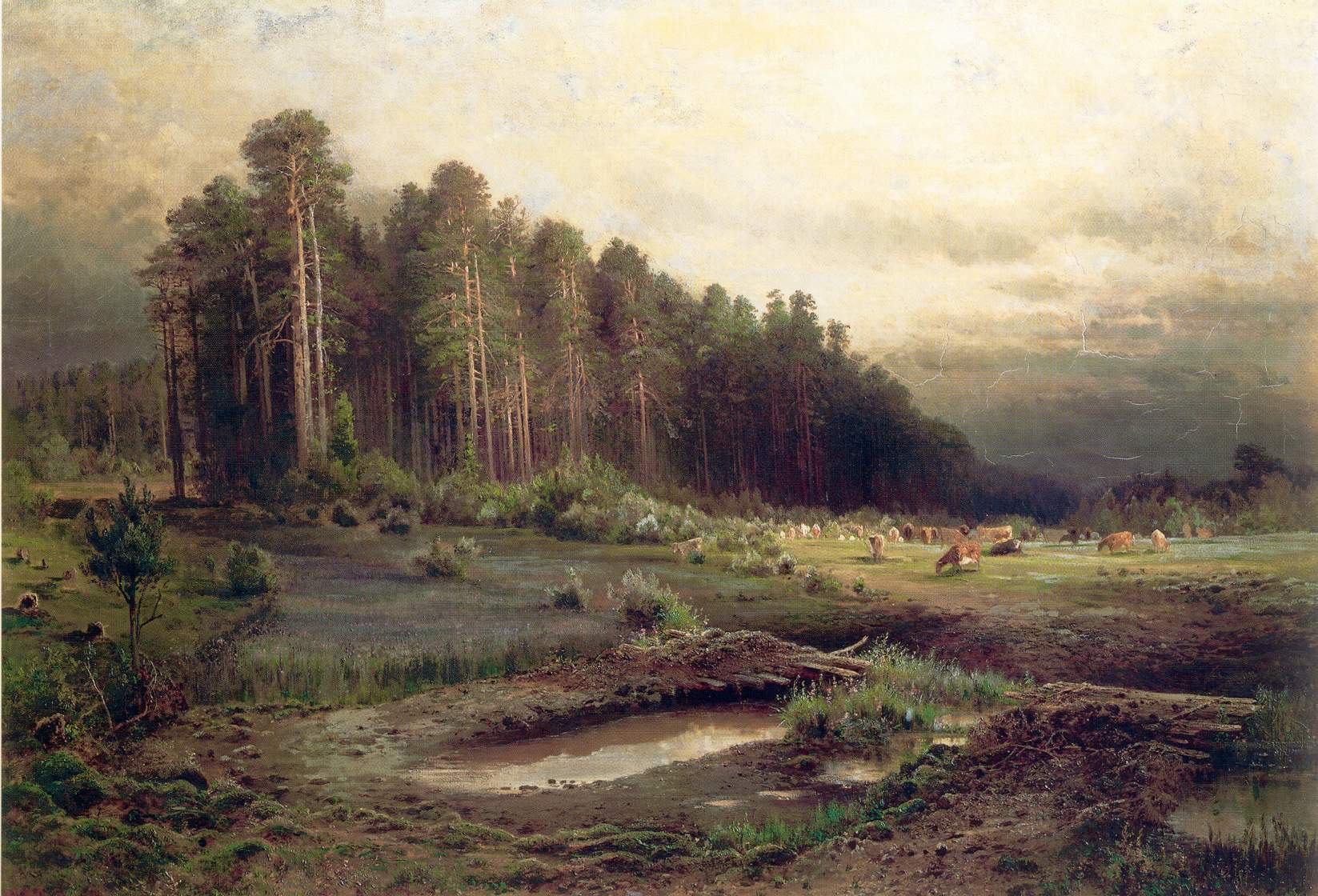
Elk Island in Sokolniki, Losiny Ostrov park, 1869 painting by Alexei Savrasov

The mammals of Moscow Oblast include badger, squirrel, beaver, otter, muskrat, stoat, Russian desman, raccoon dog, hedgehog, hare (mountain and European), shrews (common shrew, Eurasian pygmy shrew, lesser white-toothed shrew, Eurasian water shrew, etc.), weasel, fox, moose, wild boar, European mole, brown and black rats, marten, mice and voles (wood mouse, yellow-necked mouse, house mouse, Eurasian harvest mouse, northern birch mouse, bank vole, field vole, tundra vole, European water vole), European mink, deer (roe, red, fallow), hazel and fat dormouse, and European polecat. At the borders there are occasional bears, lynxes and wolves. In the southern areas there are also speckled ground squirrel, dwarf hamster, great jerboa and beech marten. Some areas contain stable populations of imported animals, such as flying squirrel, American mink and Siberian roe deer. In the oblast, there are more than a dozen species of bat and moth.

There are more than 170 species of birds in the area with large numbers of crows, sparrows, ducks, magpies, woodpeckers, thrushes, hazel grouse, bullfinches, nightingales, corncrakes, northern lapwings, white storks, grey herons, gulls and grebes. Over forty species are being hunted.

Rivers and lakes of Moscow Oblast are rich in fish, such as ruffe, carp, bream, bass, roaches, Chinese sleeper, perch and pike. There are six species of reptiles; three lizards (slowworm, viviparous lizard and sand lizard) and three snakes (European adder, grass snake and smooth snake). There is evidence for bog turtles in some areas. Amphibians are represented by 11 species, including smooth newt, great crested newt, common toad, European green toad, common frog, moor frog, marsh frog, common spadefoot and European fire-bellied toad. Insects are numerous, with bees alone accounting for more than 300 species.

In Serpukhovsky District, there is the Prioksko-Terrasny Nature Reserve which contains protected wisent. Near Moscow lies Losiny Ostrov National Park of federal significance.

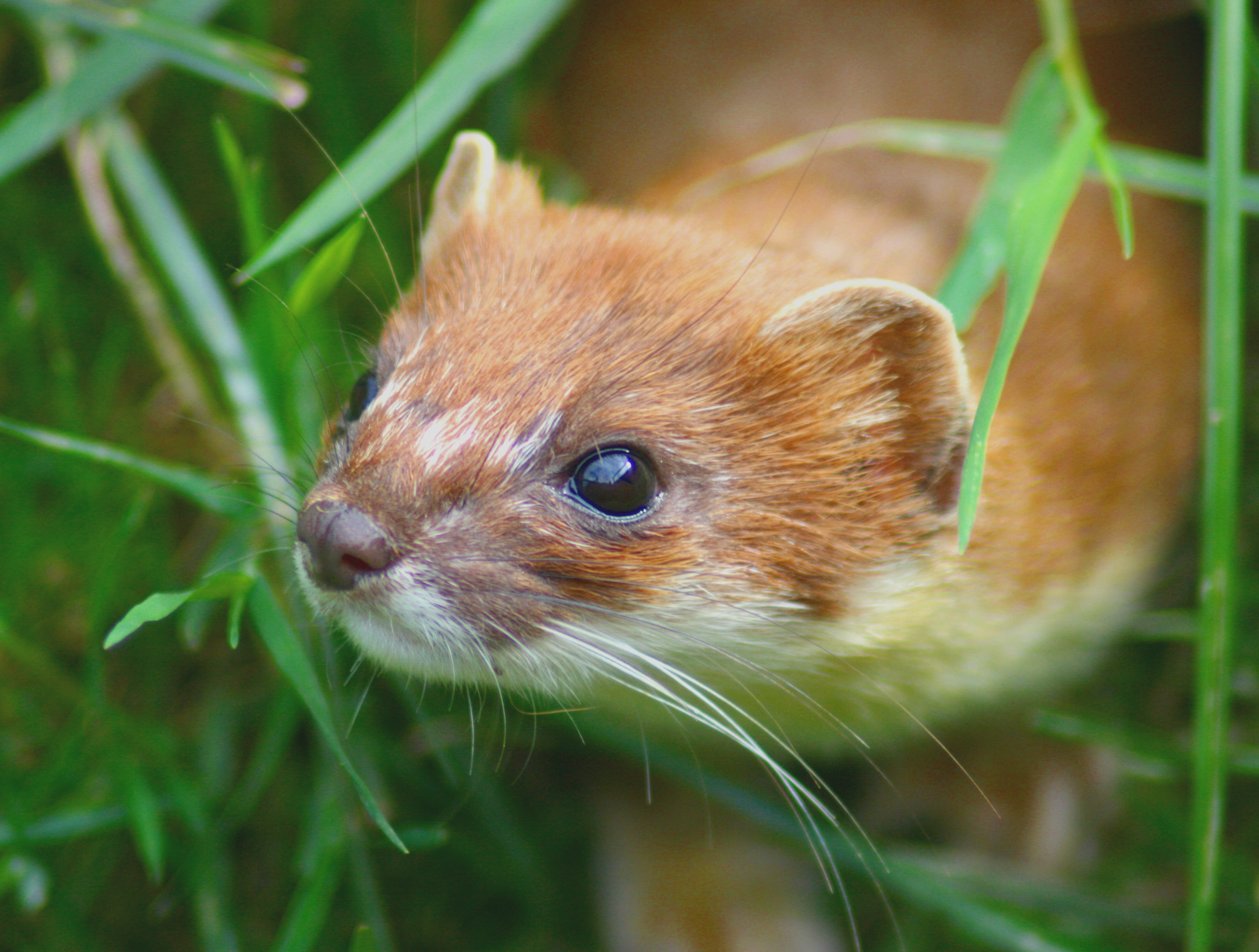
Stoat

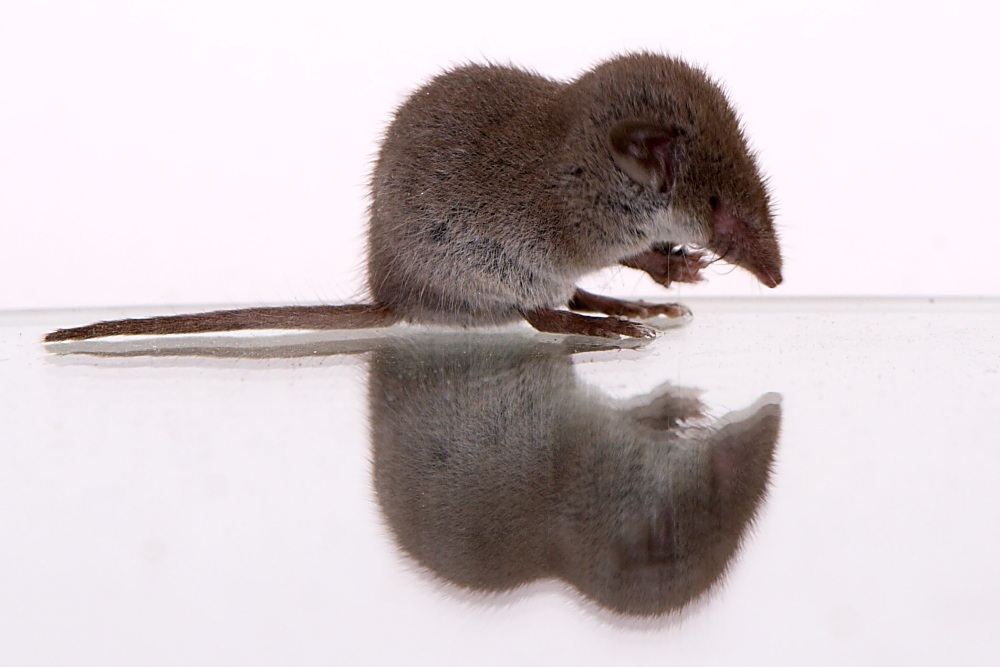
Lesser white-toothed shrew

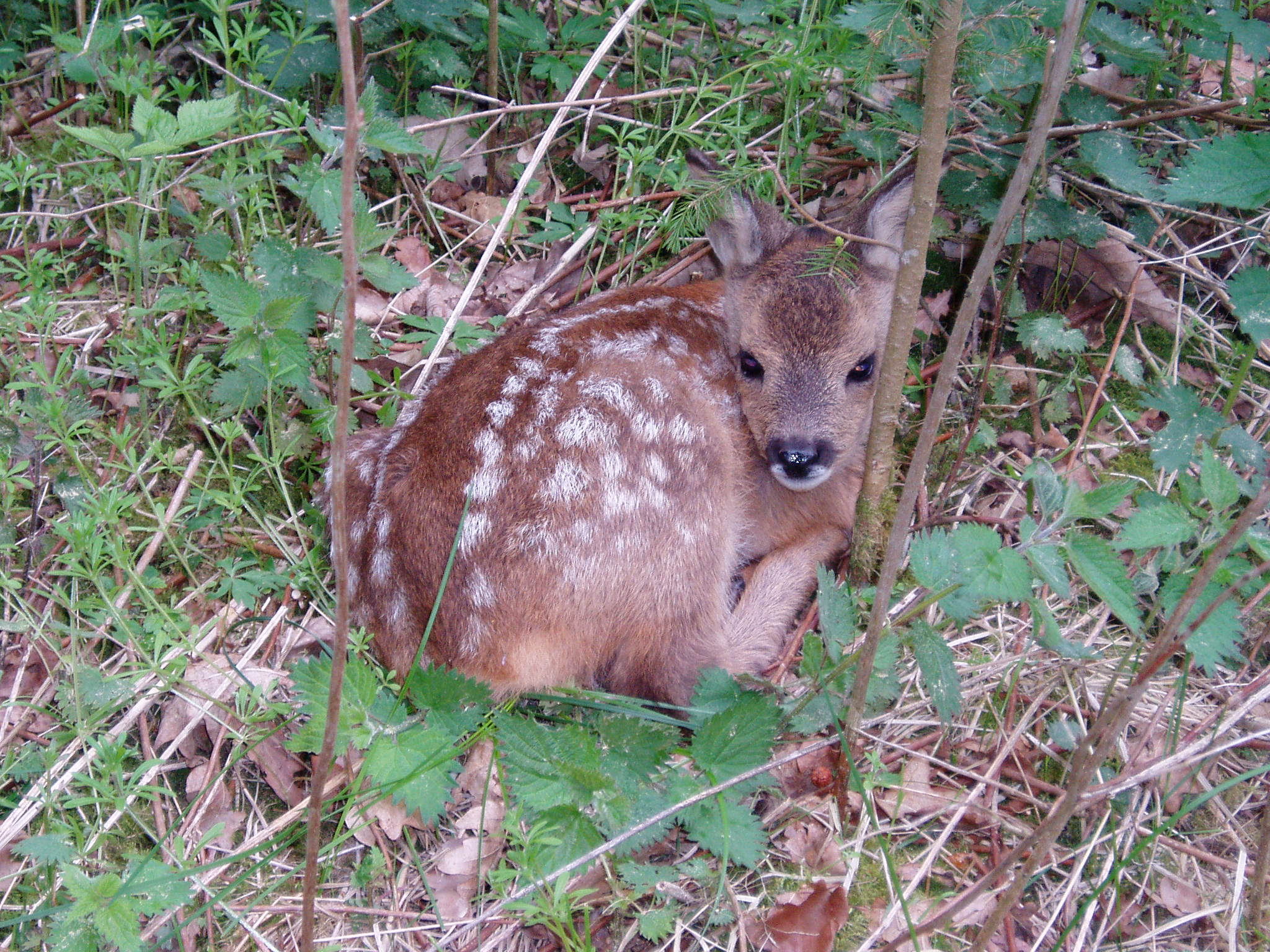
Roe deer fawn

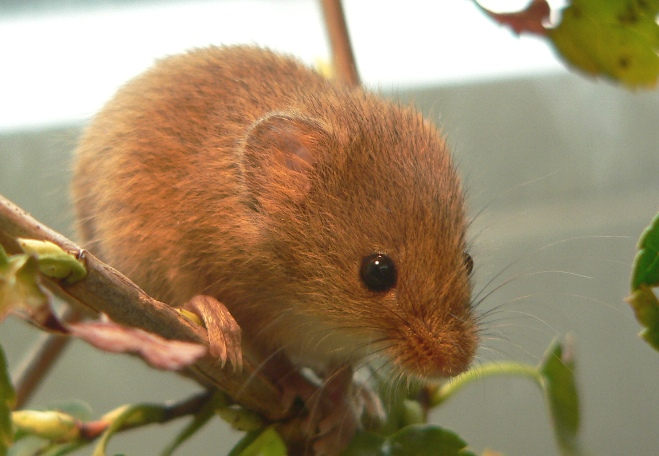
Eurasian harvest mouse

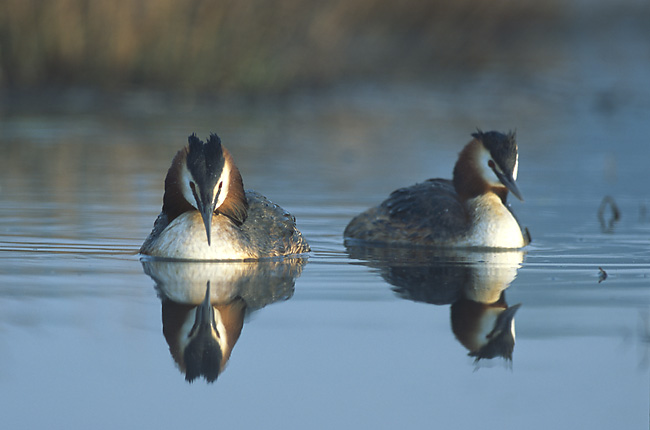
Great crested grebe

=== Environment ===
The ecological situation in the Moscow Oblast is serious. The areas adjacent to Moscow, and industrial zones in the east and south-east regions are heavily polluted. Most contamination originates from emissions from Kashira and Shatura Power Stations and disposal of household and industrial waste. For example, the Timohovskaya dump is one of the largest in Europe; other objects of concern are aging oil storage tanks, and nuclear waste in the Sergiyevo-Posadsky District. Contamination level is highest in Moscow, Voskresensk and Klin, high in Dzerzhinsky, Kolomna, Mytishchi, Podolsk, Serpukhov, Shchyolkovo, and Elektrostal, and low in Prioksko-Terrasny Biosphere Reserve. The major contaminants are formaldehyde and phenol in Moscow; ammonia and hydrogen fluoride in Voskresensk; formaldehyde in Klin, Kolomna, Mytishchi and Podolsk, phenol in Serpukhov. The most polluted rivers are Moscow, Oka and Klyazma. In the Moscow area and in major cities (in particular, in Podolsk, Orekhovo-Zuyevo, Serpukhov, Lukhovitsy and Stupino) also heavily polluted are groundwaters.

== History ==
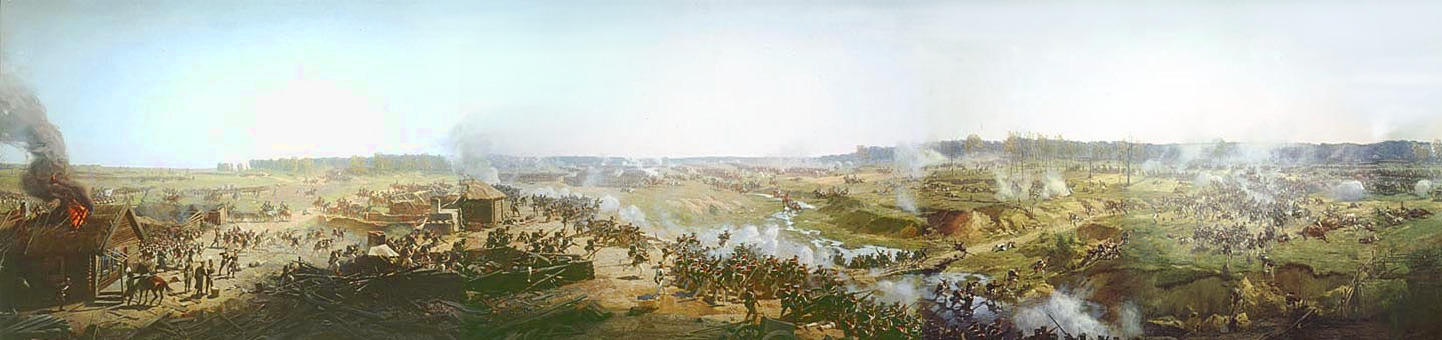
Section of the panorama of the Battle of Borodino by Franz Roubaud (1912)

The territory of what is now Moscow Oblast had been inhabited for more than twenty thousand years. Numerous mounds and settlements from Iron Age were discovered there. Up to the 9–10th centuries, the Moskva River basin and adjacent lands were inhabited by Finnic peoples. Slavs populated the area only in the 10th century. In mid-12th century, the lands became part of Vladimir-Suzdal Principality. Several important cities were founded around that time, including Volokolamsk (1135), Moscow (1147), Zvenigorod (1152), and Dmitrov (1154). In the first half of the 13th century, the entire Vladimir-Suzdal Principality, including the Moscow area, was conquered by the Mongols.

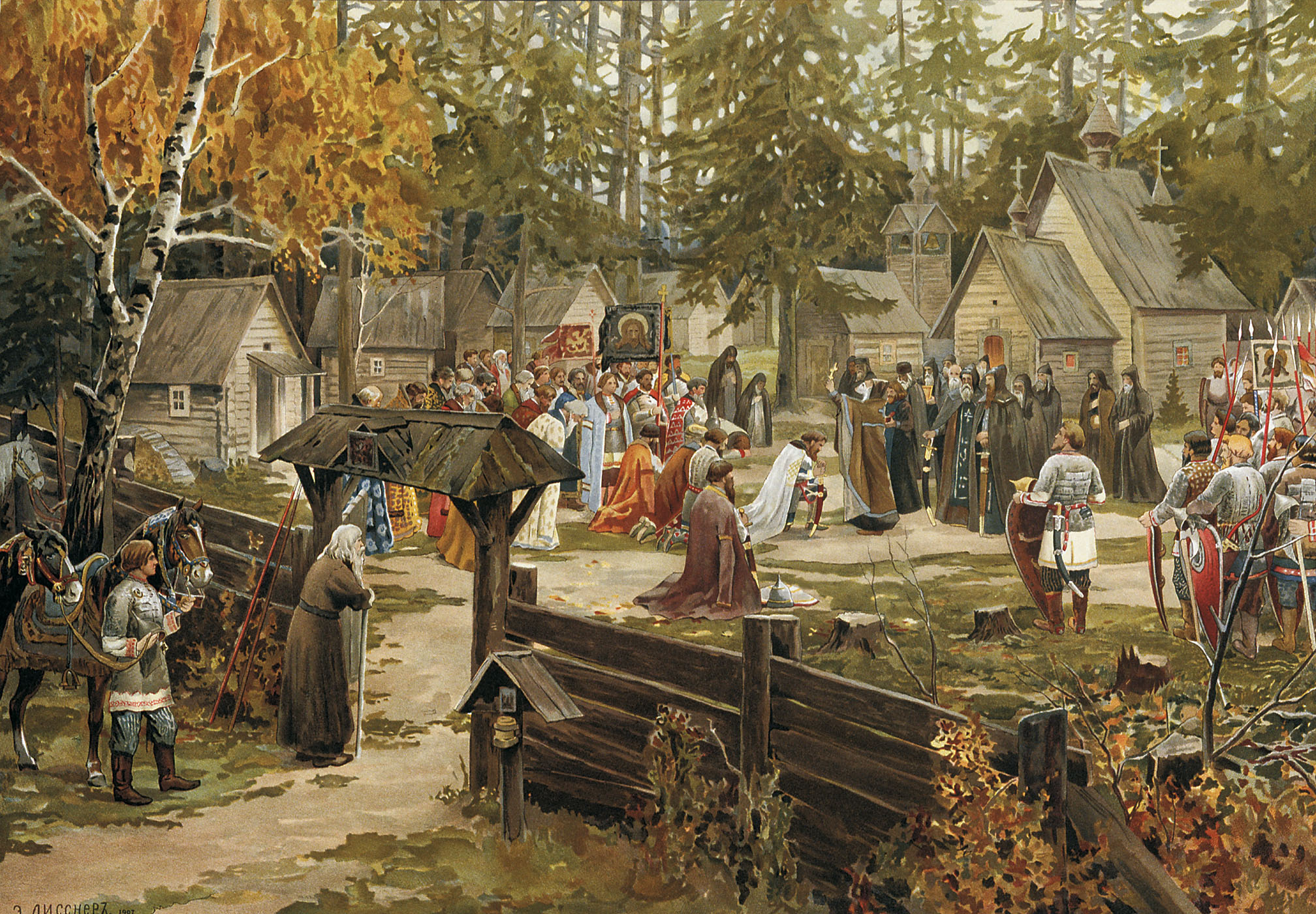
Sergius of Radonezh blesses Dmitry Donskoy, before the Battle of Kulikovo

In the 13th century, the land around Moscow was part of Grand Duchy of Moscow, which subsequently was the center of the unification of Russian lands, in particular the Mongol raids. In 1380, from Kolomna the prince Dmitry Donskoy led his troops to defeat the Mongols at the Battle of Kulikovo. The southern part of Moscow Oblast was then part of the Principality of Ryazan; it was attached to Moscow only in the 1520.

In 1708, Moscow Governorate was established by the decree of Peter the Great; the area included most of the present Moscow Oblast. The Battle of Borodino, which decided the outcome of the French invasion of Russia was fought in 1812 near Mozhaysk.

Industries developed in Moscow Oblast in the 17–19th centuries. They were centered in Bogorodsk, Pavlovsky Posad, and Orekhovo-Zuyevo and were dominated by textile production. The first railway in Russia was constructed in the Moscow Oblast in 1851, connecting Moscow and Saint Petersburg, and in 1862 the line to Nizhny Novgorod was opened.

In the Russian SFSR, Central Industrial Oblast was established on January 14, 1929. It included the abolished Moscow, Ryazan, Tver, Tula, Vladimir, and Kaluga Governorates. The oblast was divided into ten okrugs and had the administrative center in Moscow. On June 3, 1929, the area was renamed Moscow Oblast and on July 30, 1930, the division into ten okrugs was abolished.

Parts of the then bulky Moscow Oblast were gradually transferred to other divisions. In particular, twenty-six districts became part of Kalinin Oblast in January 1935, and another seventy-seven districts were separated in September 1937 as Tula and Ryazan Oblasts. Borovsky, Vysokinichsky District, Maloyaroslavetsky, Ugodsko-Zavodsky, and Petushinsky Districts were transferred in 1944 to Kaluga and Vladimir Oblasts.

In 1941 and 1942, one of the most significant military operations of World War II—the Battle of Moscow—was fought in the Moscow Oblast. Germany reached Solnechnogorsky, Klinsky, Istrinsky, Lobninsky, Khimkinsky, Naro-Fominsky, Volokolamsky, Kolomensky, Kashirsky, Serybryano-Prudsky Districts and others.

According to the Constitution of Russia, adopted in December 1993, Moscow Oblast is one of the 83 federal subjects of Russia.

== Economy ==
=== Industry ===
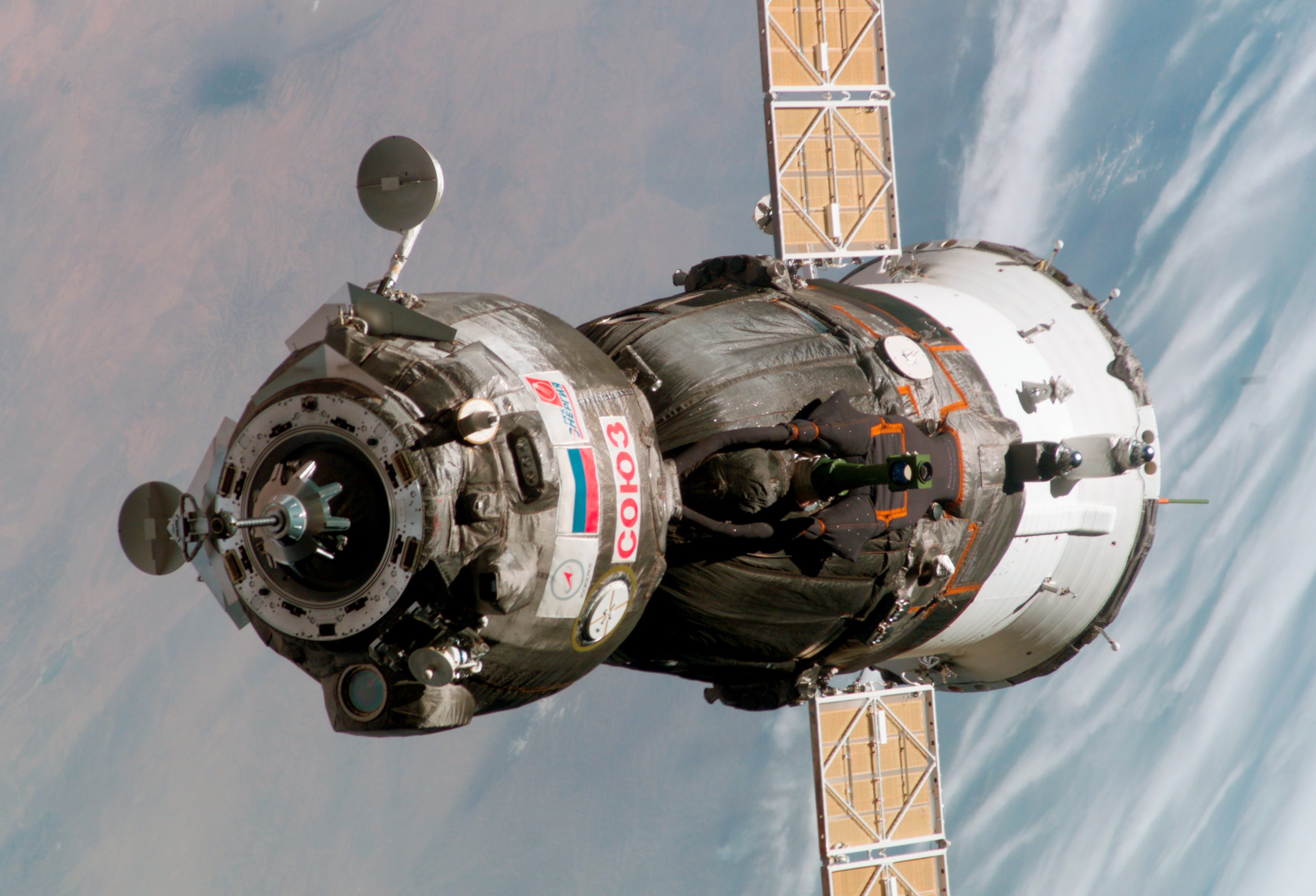
Soyuz-TMA-6 spacecraft developed by Energia

In terms of industrial production, Moscow Oblast is second in Russia, after the city of Moscow. The industry of the Oblast relies on imported raw materials, strong scientific and technological base and highly skilled workforce; it is closely linked with the industry of Moscow.

Well developed are machinery and metalworking. There are plants for the thermal and nuclear power engineering (ZiO-Podolsk in Podolsk), nuclear fuel (TVEL in Elektrostal), space and missile (Energia in Korolyov, Lavochkin in Khimki, NGO engineering in Reutov, FTSDT "Union" in Dzerzhinsky – development of solid rocket fuel, etc., IBC "Horizon" in Dzerzhinsky – power plants for aircraft, etc.); locomotives (Kolomna factory), metro cars (Metrowagonmash in Mytischi), electric trains (Demikhovsky Engineering Works), cars (SeAZ), buses (Likinsky bus plant in Likino-Dulyovo); agricultural machines, excavators and cranes (Lyubertsy, Dmitrov, Balashikha); stainless steel (Elektrostal), cables (Podolsk), optical devices (Krasnogorsky plant, Lytkarino Optical Glass Factory).

There are many defense enterprises, such as Russian Center for demonstrations of weapons, military equipment and technology in Krasnoarmeysk; Kamov, Phazotron, Bazalt, NPP Zvezda, MKB Fakel, MKB Raduga, National Research Institute of Aviation Systems, Krasnozavodsk Chemical Plant, Tikhomirov Scientific Research Institute of Instrument Design, Moscow Research Institute "Agat", Dolgoprudnenskoe Scientific Production Plant, and many others.

Chemical industry of the Oblast produces acids (Shchyolkovo), mineral fertilizers (plants named "Phosphates" and "Mineral fertilizers" in Voskresensk), synthetic fibers (Serpukhov and Klin), plastics (Orekhovo-Zuyevo), varnishes and paints (Sergiyev Posad, Odintsovsky paint factories), pharmaceuticals (Staraya Kupavna). There is a well-developed industry of construction materials with production of cement in Voskresensk and Kolomna (Shchurovsky cement factory), earthenware, porcelain in the Likino-Dulyovo (Dulevo Porcelain Factory) and Verbilki and dry mortar plant in Krasnogorsk.

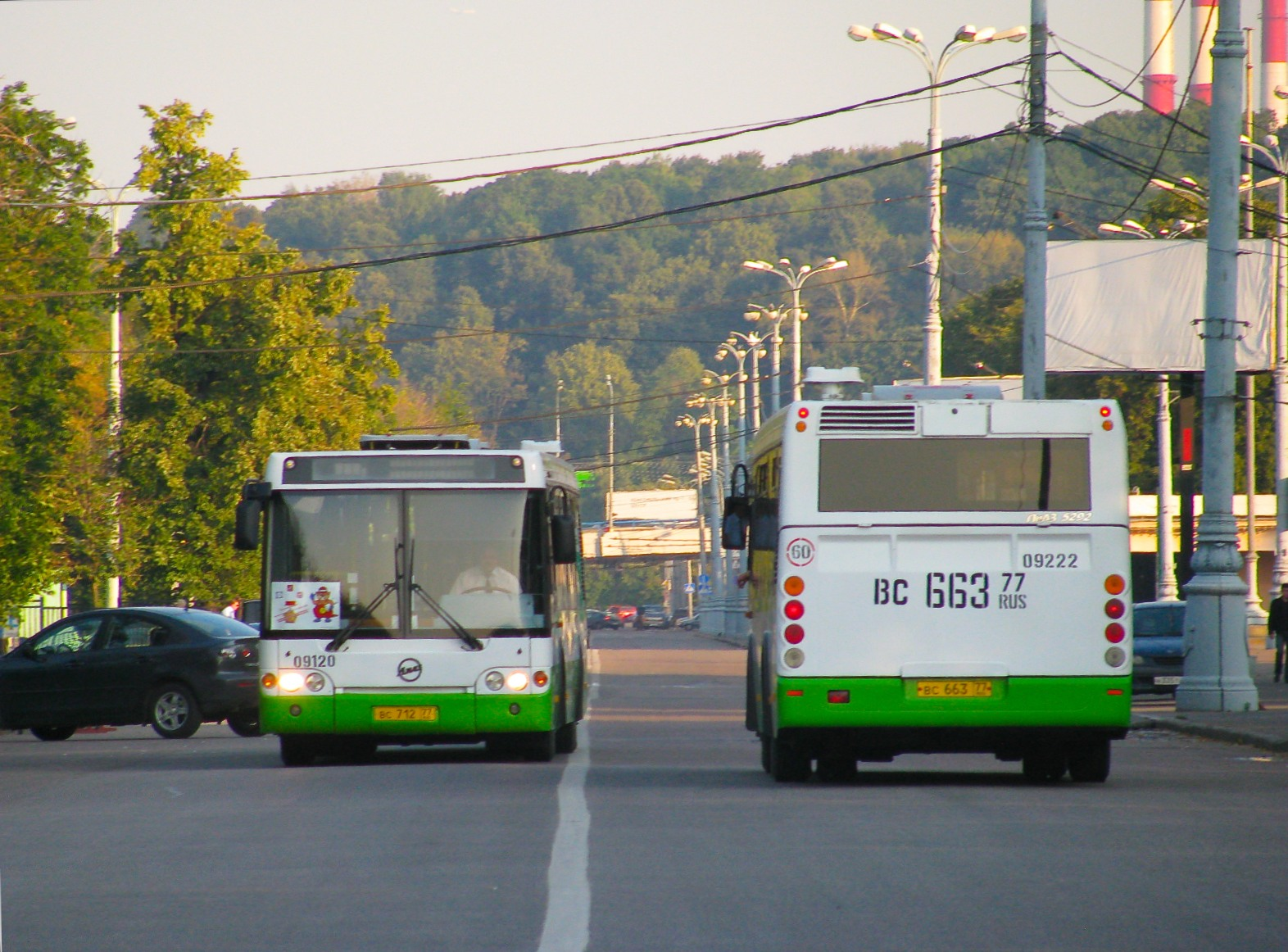
LiAZ-5292

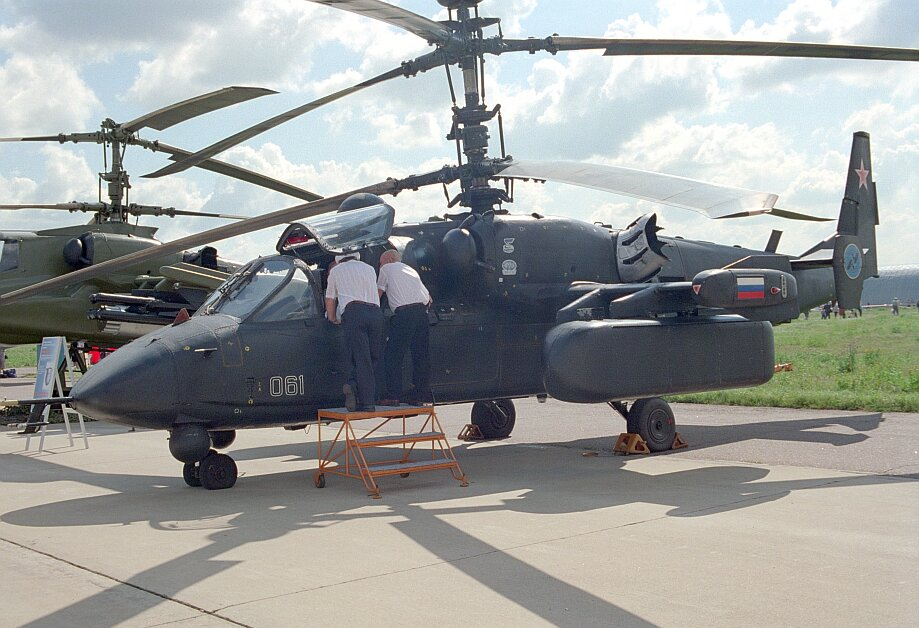
Ka-52 "Alligator" by Kamov

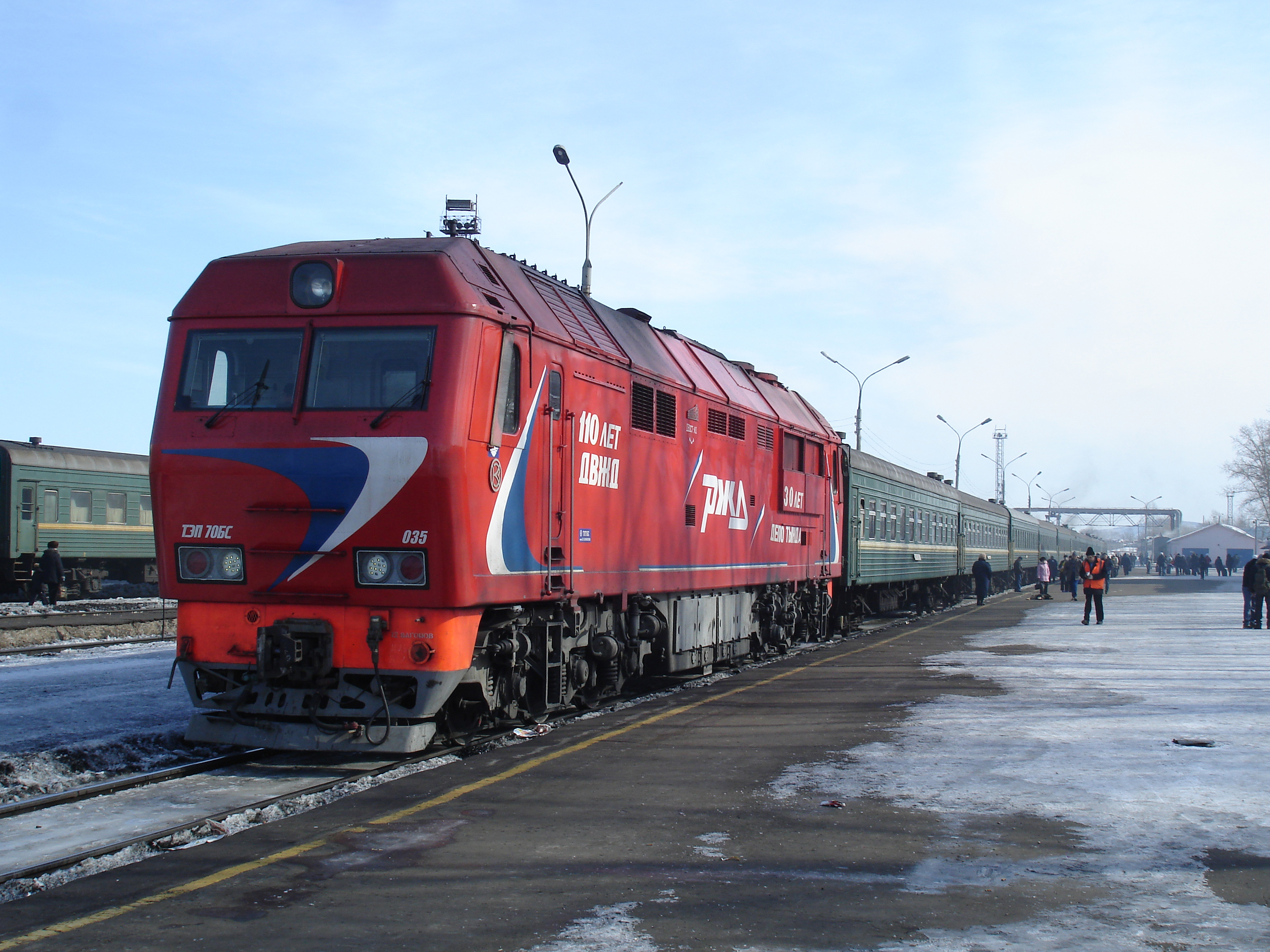
Diesel TEP70BS (Kolomna plant)

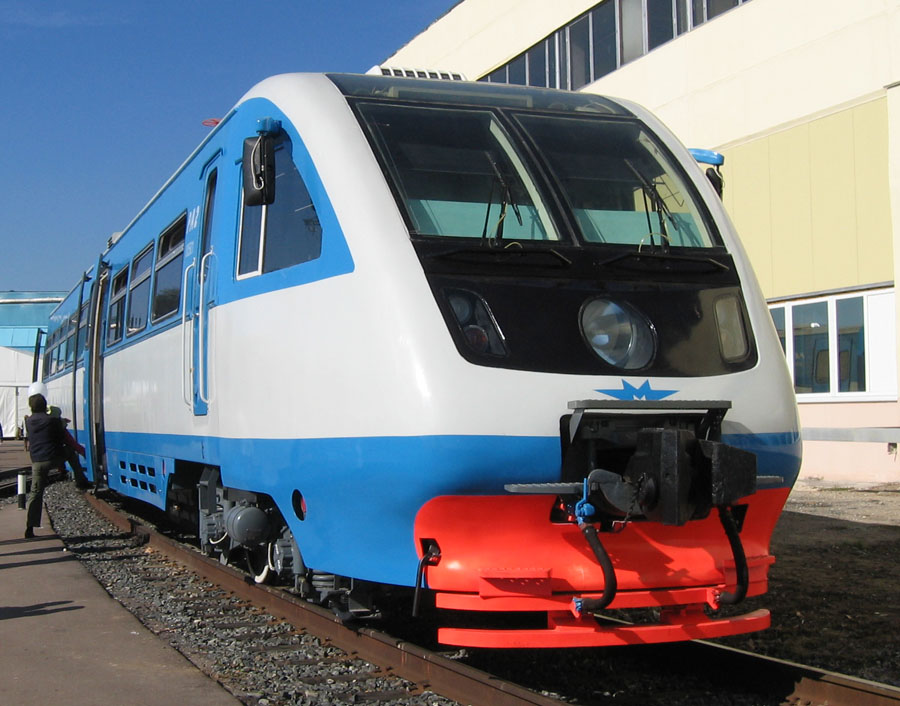
Railcar Rail bus (Metrovagonmash)

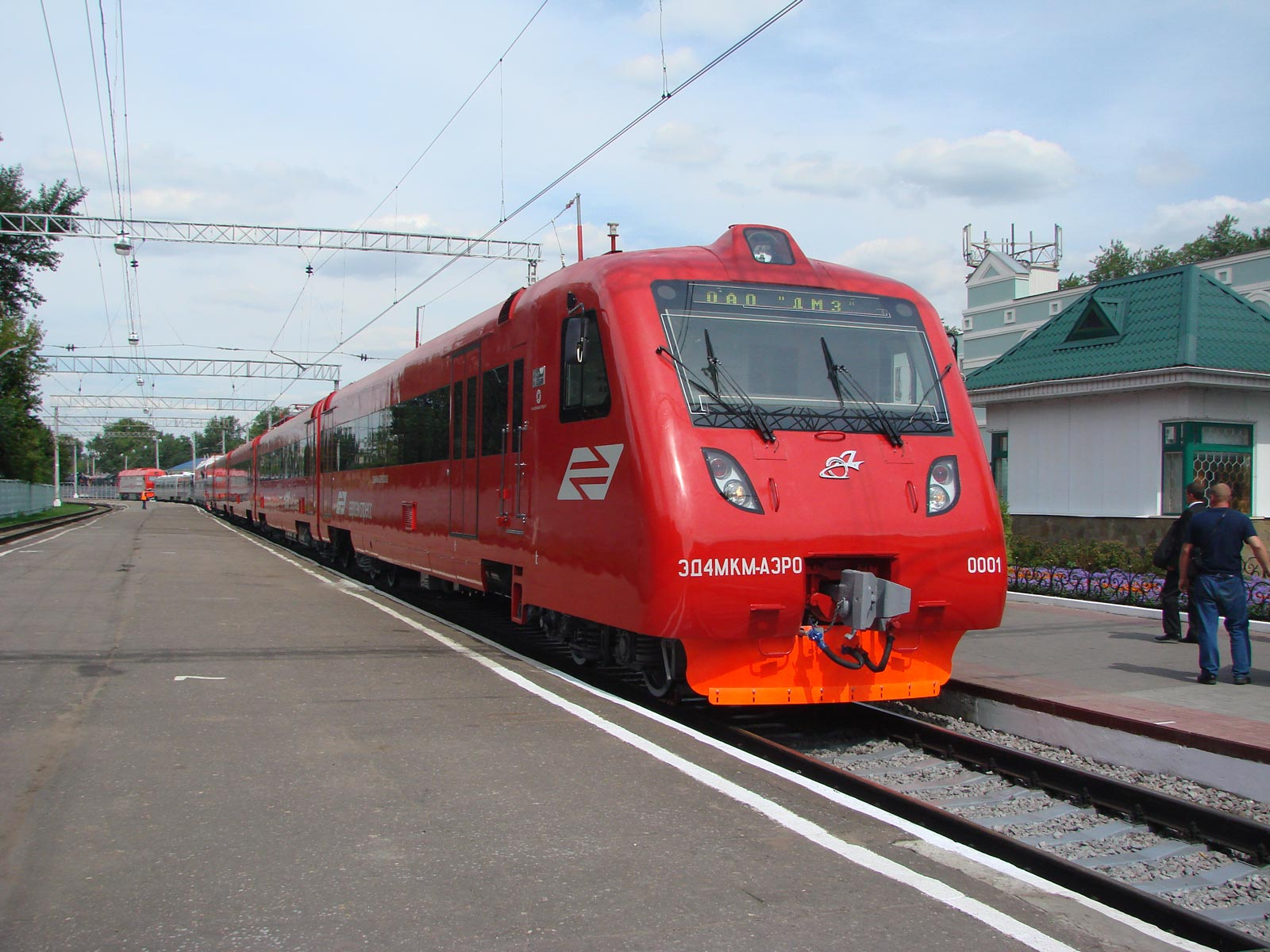
Electric train ED4MKM-AERO (Demikhovsky Engineering Works)

Light industry is the oldest in the region; it was started in the 17th century and with 35% contribution was leading the gross industrial production. There is still production of cotton (in Yegoryevsk, Noginsk, Orekhovo-Zuyevo), wool (in Pavlovsky Posad and Pushkino) and jerseys (in Ivanteyevka and Dmitrov). The silk production in Naro-Fominsk had been stopped. Traditional and renowned crafts include Gzhel, Zhostovo painting and Fedoskino miniature. Large foreign investment projects include the plant for manufacturing household appliances (TV sets, washing machines, refrigerators, etc.) by the South Korean company LG built near the village of Dorokhovo.

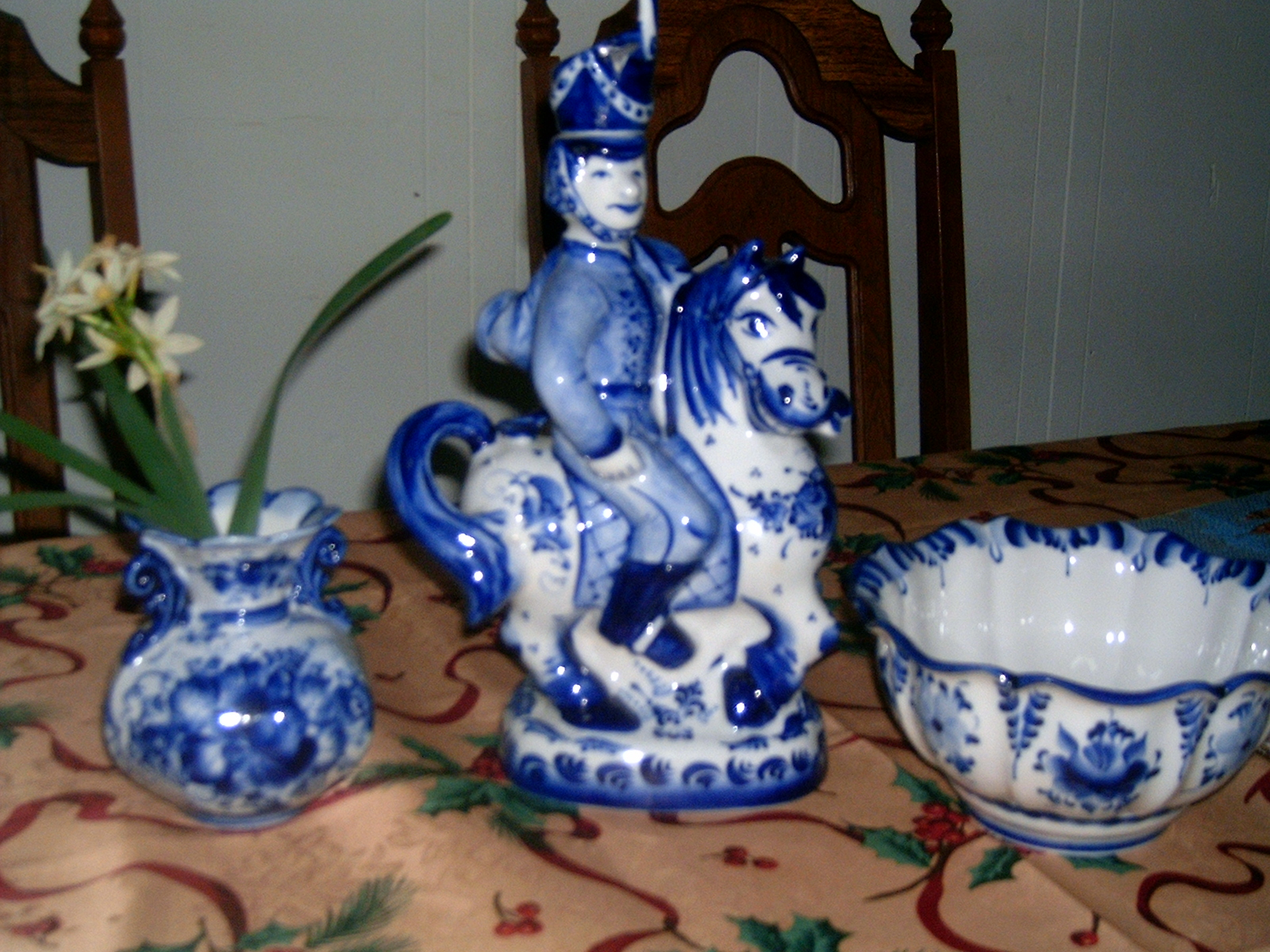
Examples of the Gzhel style

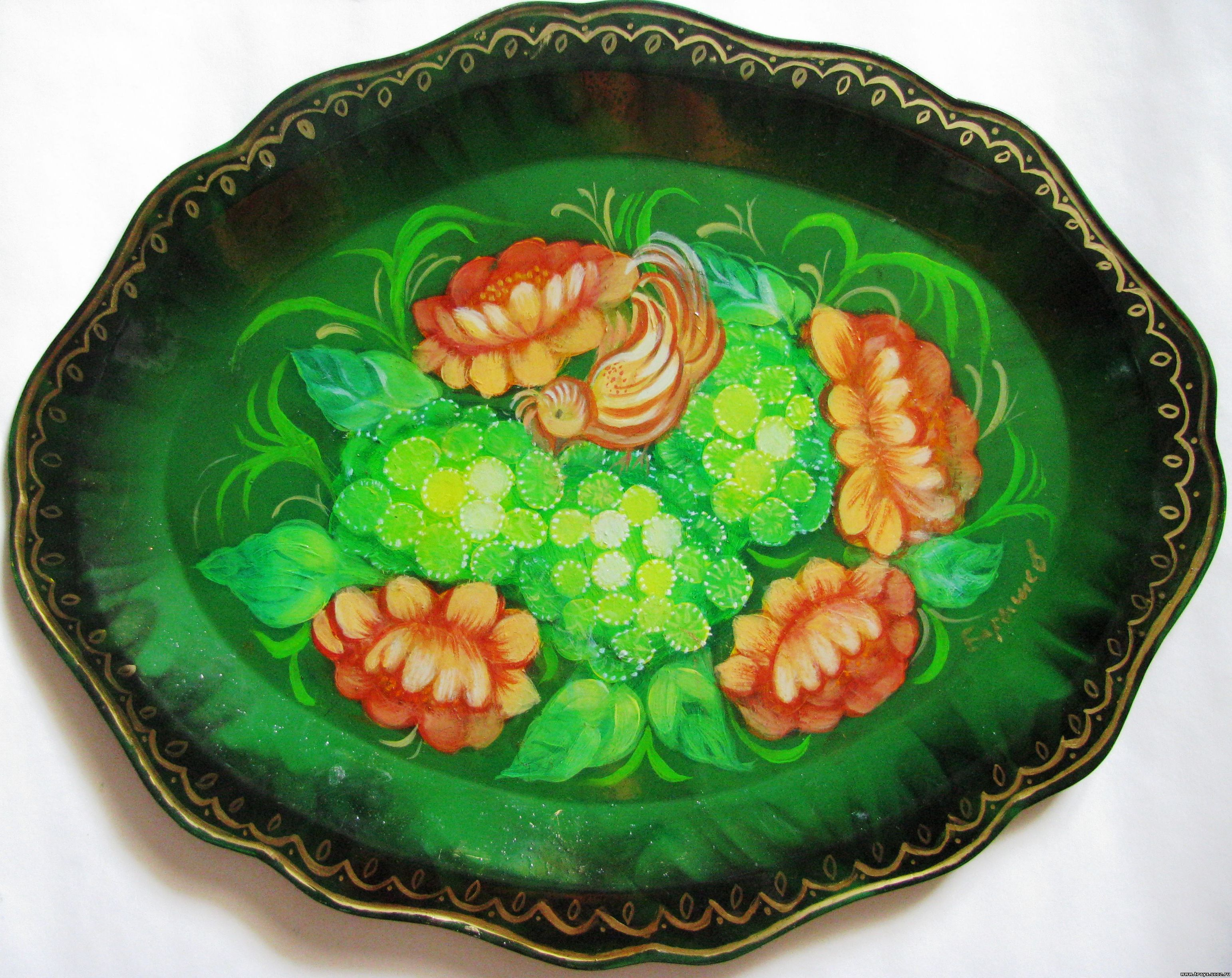
Example of Zhostovo painting

=== Energy ===
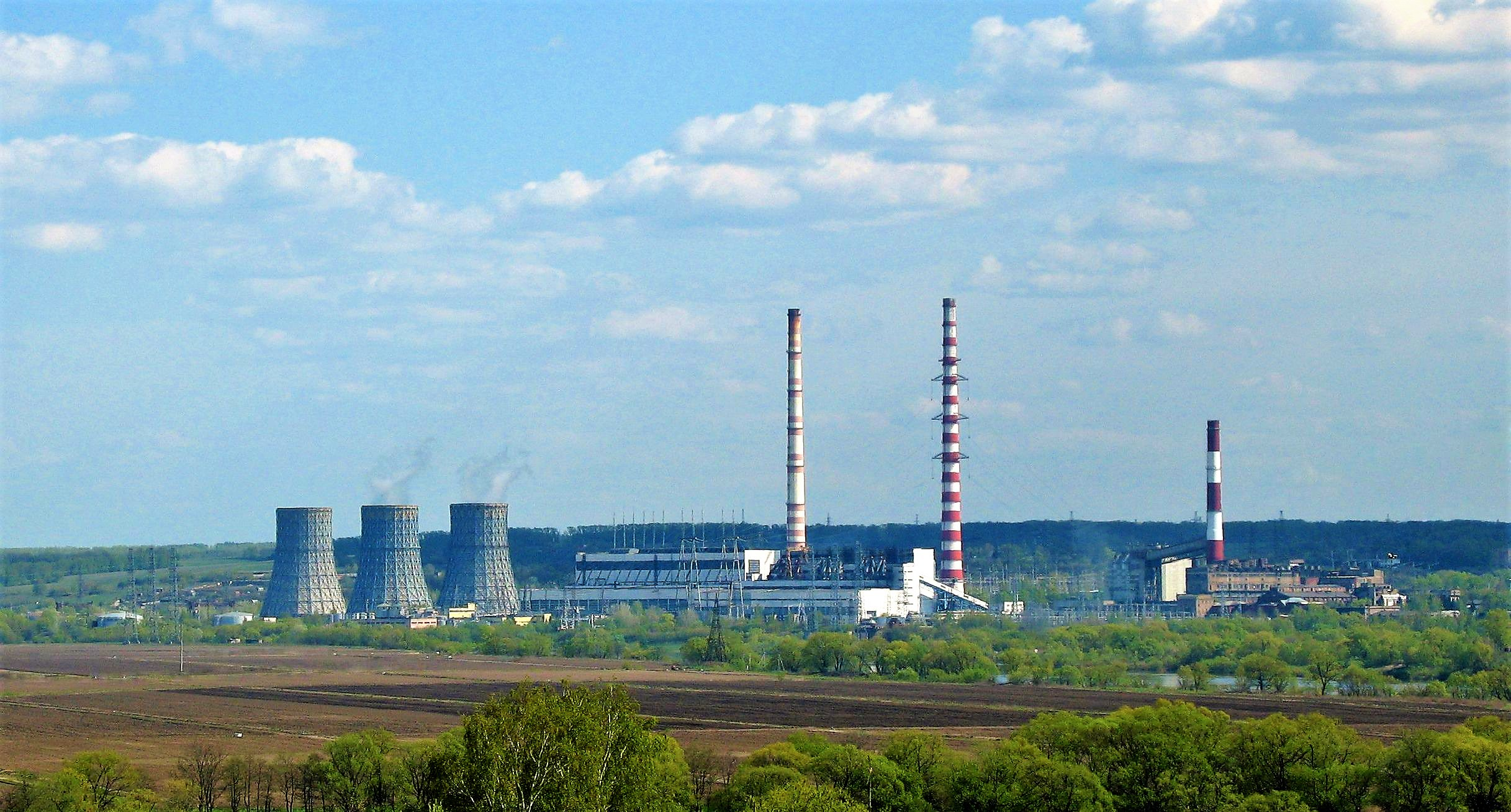
The largest source of electricity in the Moscow region – Kashira Power Plant

In 1999, Moscow Oblast consumed 15.4 billion m^{3} of natural gas, 3.32 million tonnes of oil, 2.13 million tonnes of coal and 8.5 billion kWh of electricity. Electricity for the Oblast is provided by the Kashirskaya thermal power plant (TPP, 1910 MW), Dzerzhynskaya TPP No 22 (1300 MW), Thermal Power Plant 27 (1100 MW), Shatura Power Station (1100 MW), Zagorskaya hydroelectric power plant (1200 MW), Elektrogorsk TPP (623 MW) and several smaller plants. Major new energy project in the region is the construction of Zagorsk hydroelectric plant with the capacity of 840 MW. The deficit of energy is provided by powerlines connecting the region with Saint Petersburg, Volga Hydroelectric Station and other energy suppliers.

=== Agriculture ===
Agriculture has a relatively minor role in the economy of the Oblast. Only 25% of land is cultivated and another 15% are used for other activities such as livestock farming. Agriculture is the least developed in the northern, eastern and western border regions. In the southern region, especially south of the Oka River, more than 50% of land is used in agriculture. Horticulture is typical for the southern region with most of the sown area (more than 3/5) occupied by forage crops. Large areas are reserved for grains, especially wheat, barley, oats and rye, and significant role plays potato. Greenhouses are very common and Moskovsky city hosts the largest greenhouse complex in Europe. Also grown are flowers and mushrooms. Livestock farming predominates over the crop, and is primarily aimed at the production of milk and meat. In addition to cattle, commonly bred are pigs and chickens.

The economic crisis of the 1990s in Russia had severely affected the agriculture of Moscow Oblast. In particular, in the 2000s, as compared with 1970–80s, the grain production has fallen by more than 3 times; potatoes by 2.5 times; vegetables, livestock and poultry by 30%; milk by 2 times and eggs by 4 times.

=== Transport ===
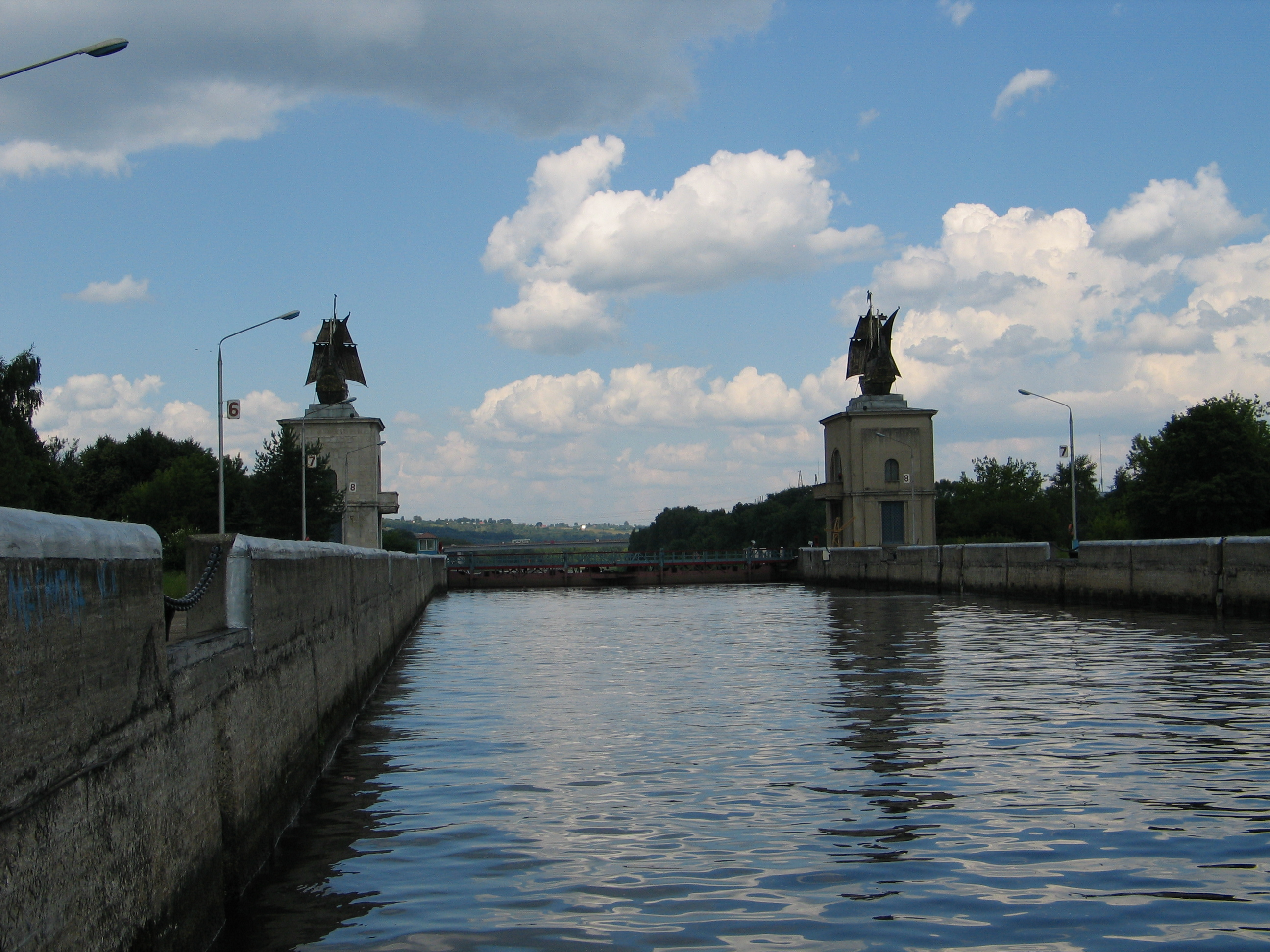
The gateway to the Moscow Canal in Yakhroma

Moscow Oblast has a dense transport network, including roads, railways and waterways along the largest rivers, lakes and reservoirs. Land routes are radially diverging from Moscow and crossed by one railway and two highway rings. Neither railways nor roads, built for the most part many years ago, can cope with the steadily mounting traffic flows. About half of the roads are overloaded and three quarters do not meet modern requirements. Insufficient width of the roads and frequent repairs cause traffic jams.

Moscow Oblast has the highest density of railways in Russia. Eleven major radial lines originate in Moscow and run through the Oblast; the total length of the railways reaches 2,700 km. Almost all railroads are electrified. The largest rail hubs are Orekhovo-Zuyevo and Bekasovo. Regular navigation is carried on the rivers Volga, Oka and Moscow, as well as on the Moscow Canal. Major river ports are in Serpukhov and Kolomna. Also well-developed is pipeline transport. There are two major oil lines, two natural gas rings and numerous radial lines connecting Moscow with the largest gas producing regions of the country.

Moscow and Moscow Oblast have several international passenger airports, namely Sheremetyevo (with two terminals), Vnukovo, Domodedovo and Ostafyevo. There is also Bykovo Airport, which is used for freight. The largest military airport is Chkalovsky (near Shchyolkovo) which also processes some civilian passenger and cargo flights.

Major highways of Moscow Oblast are as follows:

- Minsk highway (M1 "Belarus" Moscow – Belarus) (E101)
- Simferopol highway (M2 "Crimea") Moscow – Belgorod (E105)
- Kiev highway (M3 "Ukraine" Moscow – Kaluga – Bryansk – Kyiv)
- M4 highway (Russia) (M4 "Don" Moscow – Voronezh - Rostov-on-Don - Krasnodar) (E115)
- Ryazan highway (M5 "Ural" Moscow – Chelyabinsk) (E30)
- Nizhny Novgorod highway (M7 "Volga" Moscow – Ufa) (E22)
- Kholmogory – Yaroslavl highway (M8 "Kholmogory" Moscow – Arkhangelsk) (E115)
- Novorizhskoe highway (M9 "Baltic" Moscow – Riga) (E22)
- Leningrad highway (M10 "Russia" Moscow – Tver – Novgorod – Saint Petersburg) (E105)
- Mozhaysk highway (A100 Moscow – Borodino)
- М11 Neva Moscow–Saint Petersburg motorway
- Kaluga highway (A101, Moscow – Troitsk – Obninsk – Kaluga)
- Schelkovskoe highway (A103 Moscow – Shchyolkovo – Chernogolovka)
- Dmitrovskoe (A104 Moscow – Dubna)
- Small Concrete Ring (A107)
- Large Concrete Ring (А108)
- Central Ring Road (А113)
- Yegoryevsk highway (R105 Moscow – Kasimov)
- Pyatnitskoe highway (R111 Moscow – Solnechnogorsk)
- Rogachev highway (P113 Lobnya – Rogachevo)
- Nosovihinskoe highway (Moscow – Likino-Dulyovo)
- Warsaw highway (Moscow – Podolsk – Obninsk – Roslavl)
- Borovskoye highway (Moscow – Vnukovo)
- Rublyovo-Uspenskoe highway
- Dzerzhynsk highway (Dzerzhinsky – Kotelniki – Novoryazanskoye highway)
- Ostashkovskoye highway (Moscow – Mytischi)

== Government and awards ==
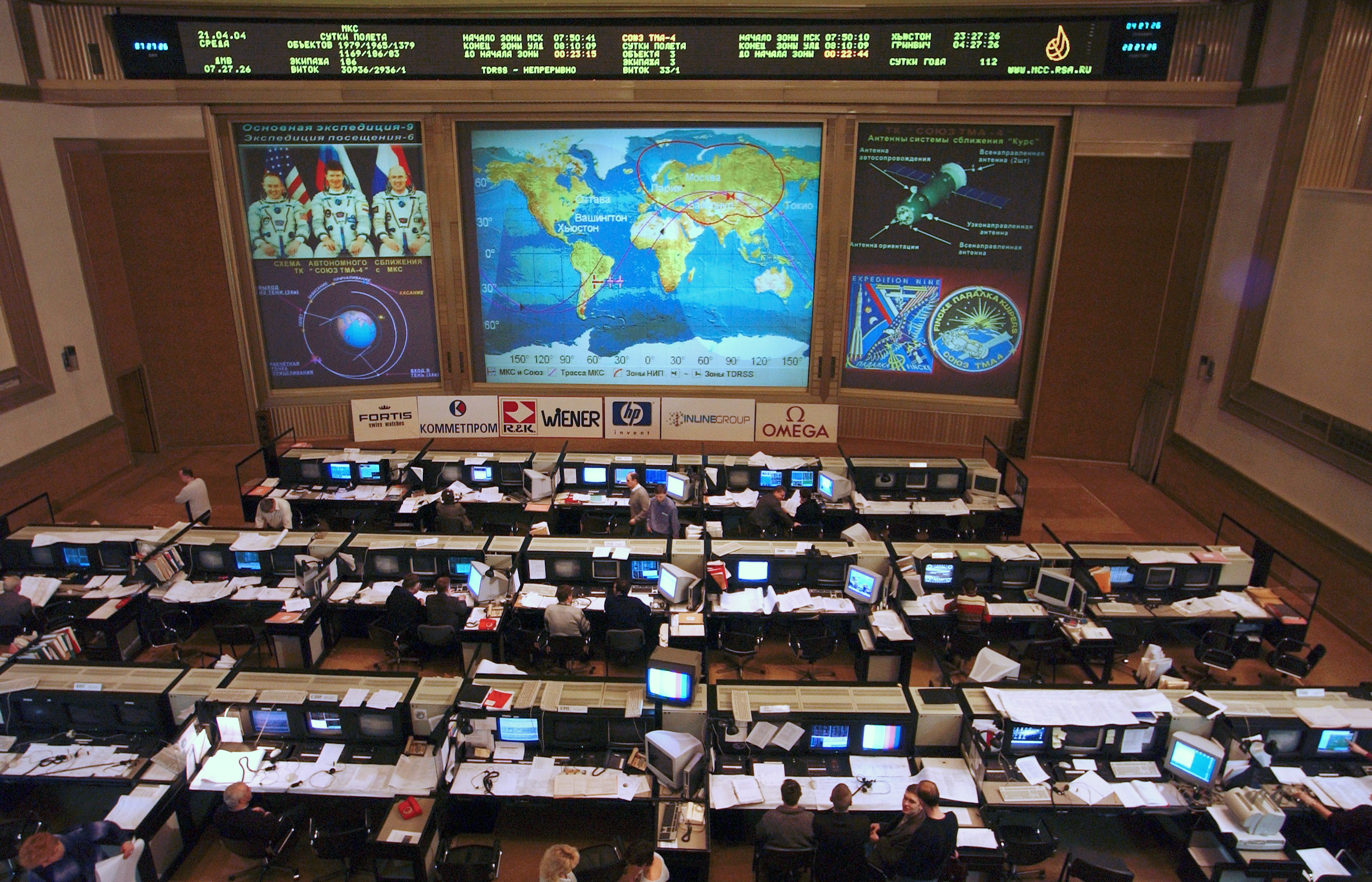
The RKA Mission Control Center in Korolyov

Moscow Oblast was awarded three Orders of Lenin, on 3 January 1934, 17 December 1956 and 5 December 1966.

The highest executive organ is the Government of Moscow Oblast. Eighteen ministries act as the executive bodies of state authority. The powers, tasks, functions and competence of the Government are defined by the Charter of the Moscow Region. The Governor of the Moscow Oblast will be elected with the term of 5 years. The Regional Duma of Moscow Oblast was formed on 12 December 1993. It consists of 50 deputies also serving a 5-year term.

Sergey Shoygu was elected as Governor of Moscow Oblast in April 2012 by the Moscow Oblast Duma. Shoygu left office after only six months with his appointment when he was appointed as Minister of Defence by Vladimir Putin. Andrei Vorobyov was appointed as acting governor and won a full term to the office in the 2013 elections.

== Science ==
Moscow Oblast has a high density of scientific research institutions, especially related to engineering and military technologies. The latter started developing in the region in 1930–1940s in Zhukovsky (aeronautical engineering), Klimovsk (development of small arms), Reutov (Missile Engineering), Fryazino (microwave electronics) and Korolyov (space technology). They were later joined by famous centers for basic sciences in Troitsk, Chernogolovka (physics and chemistry), Dubna and Protvino (nuclear physics) and Pushchino (biology). Moscow Oblast hosts Mission Control Centers for spacecraft (in Korolyov) and military satellites (Krasnoznamensk), as well as a number of test sites.

== Sport ==
=== Bandy ===
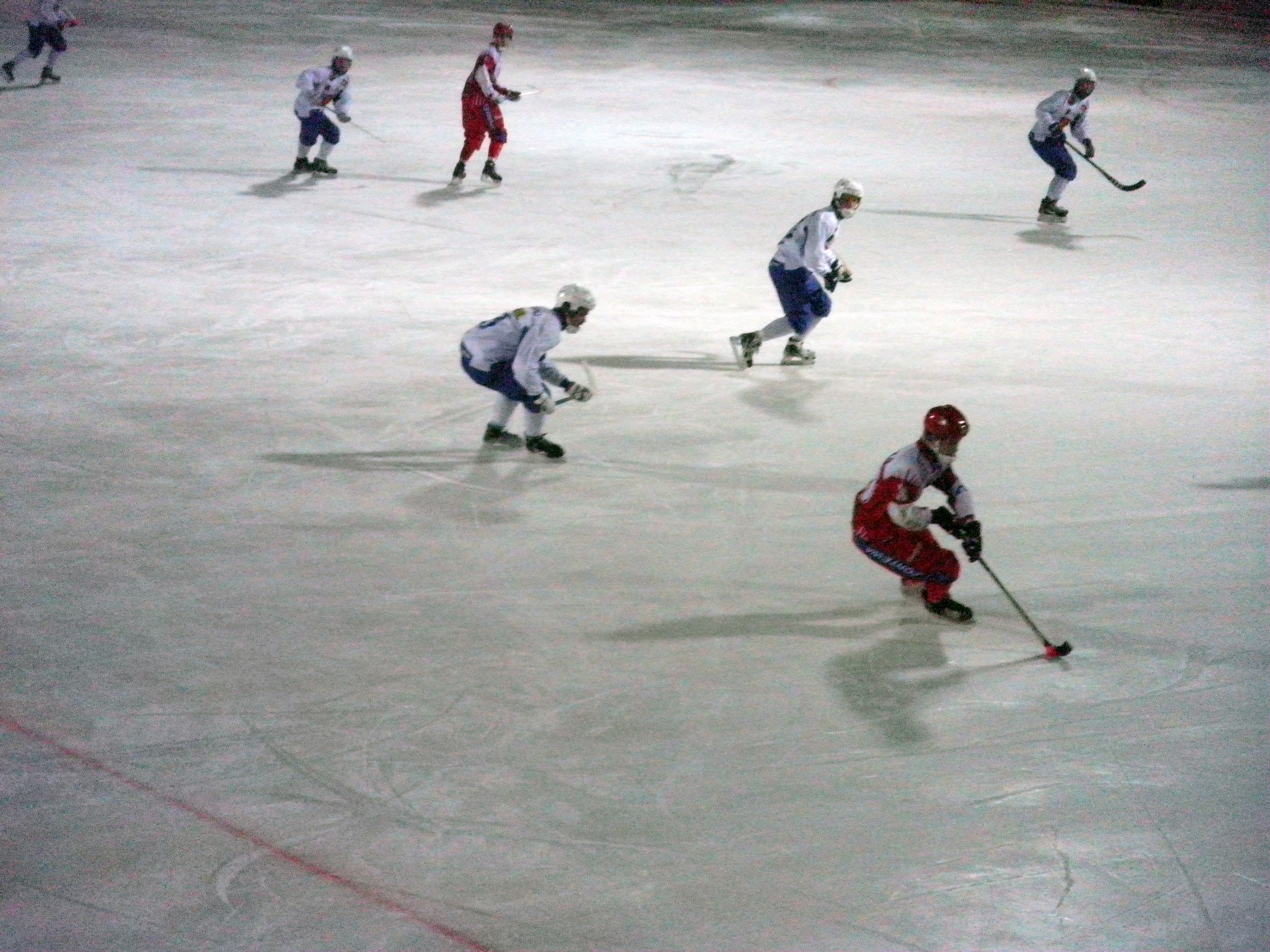
The 2011 Bandy World Championship Y-23 in Obukhovo

Zorky from Krasnogorsk has become national bandy champions three times. In the 2017–18 season, Zorky is back in Super League, after one season in the second-tier league. Obukhovo is the only location in Russia without a Super League team which has a bandy venue with artificial ice. A plan for artificial ice also existed in Korolyov. However, the project was abandoned. Although an indoor ice hockey-sized arena entered the plans instead, the official reason given was financial problems.

The Russian Rink Bandy Cup 2017 was played in Balashikha.

=== Speed skating ===
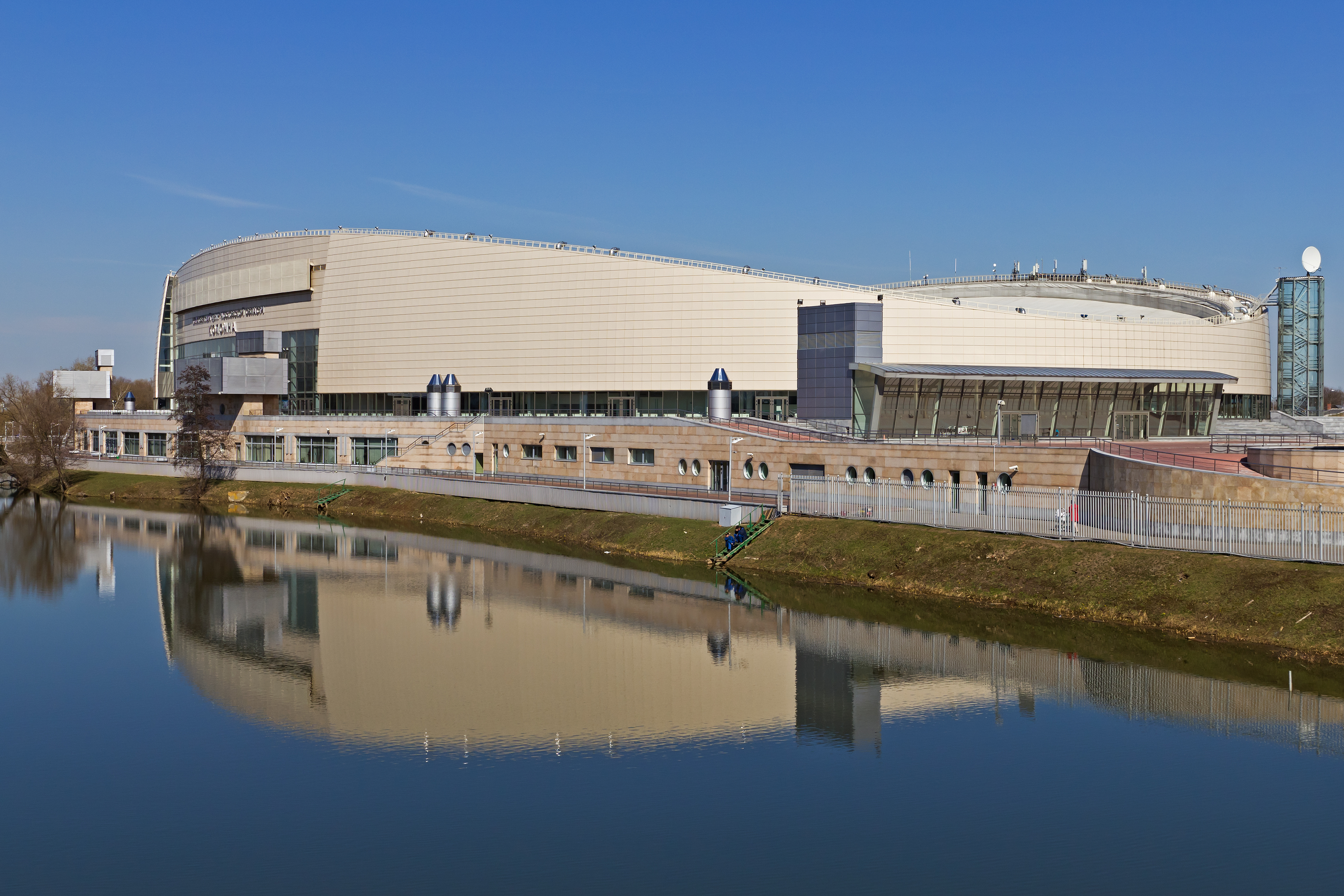
Kolomna Speed Skating Center is one of Russia's indoor facilities for speed skating

The 2008 European Speed Skating Championships and the 2016 World Single Distance Speed Skating Championships were held in Kolomna.

=== Association football ===
FK Khimki and Saturn Ramenskoye are the most supported clubs that represent the region. The third professional club Znamya Truda is the oldest existing football club in the country founded in 1909.

== Culture and recreation ==
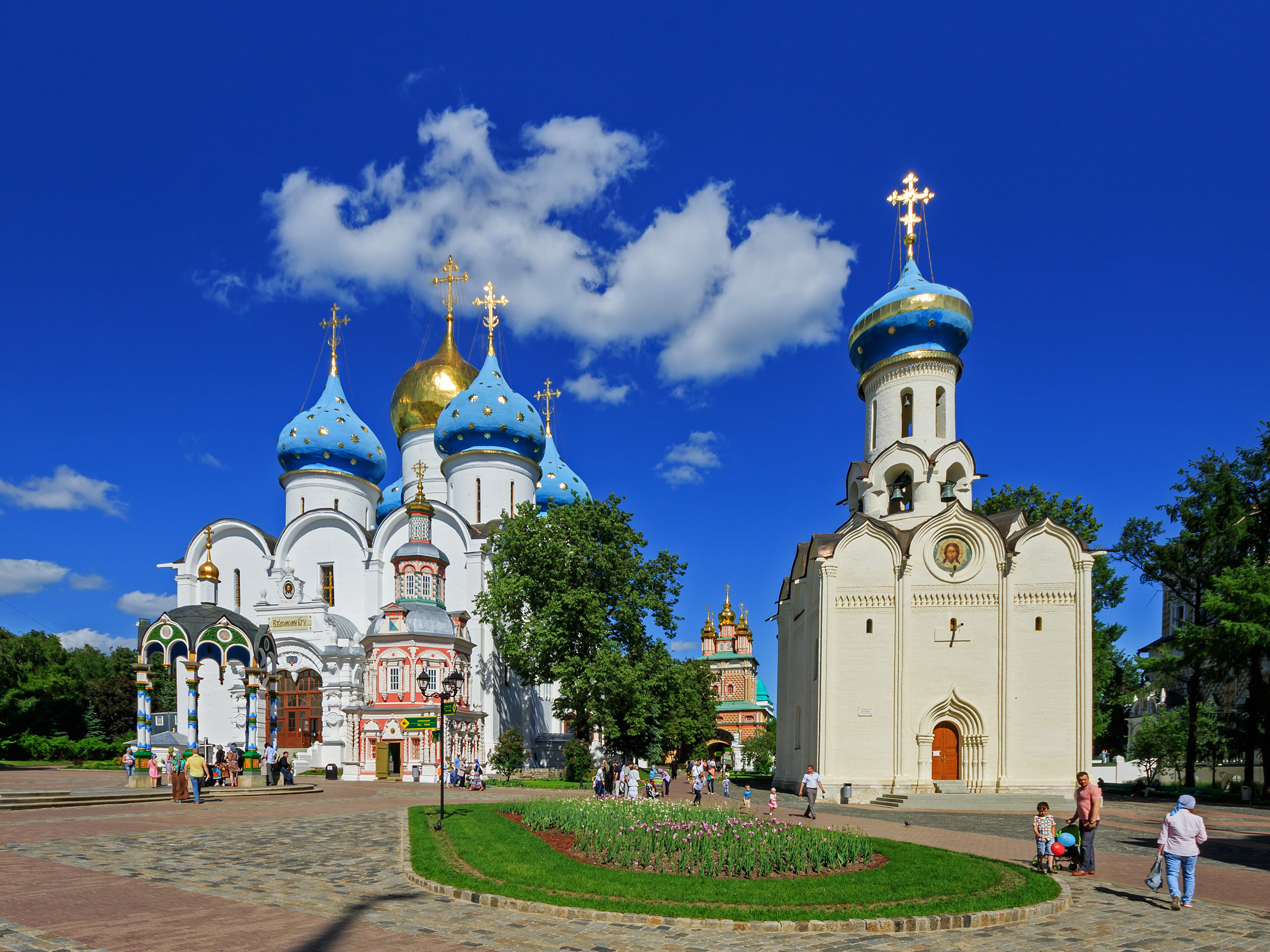
Trinity Lavra of St. Sergius

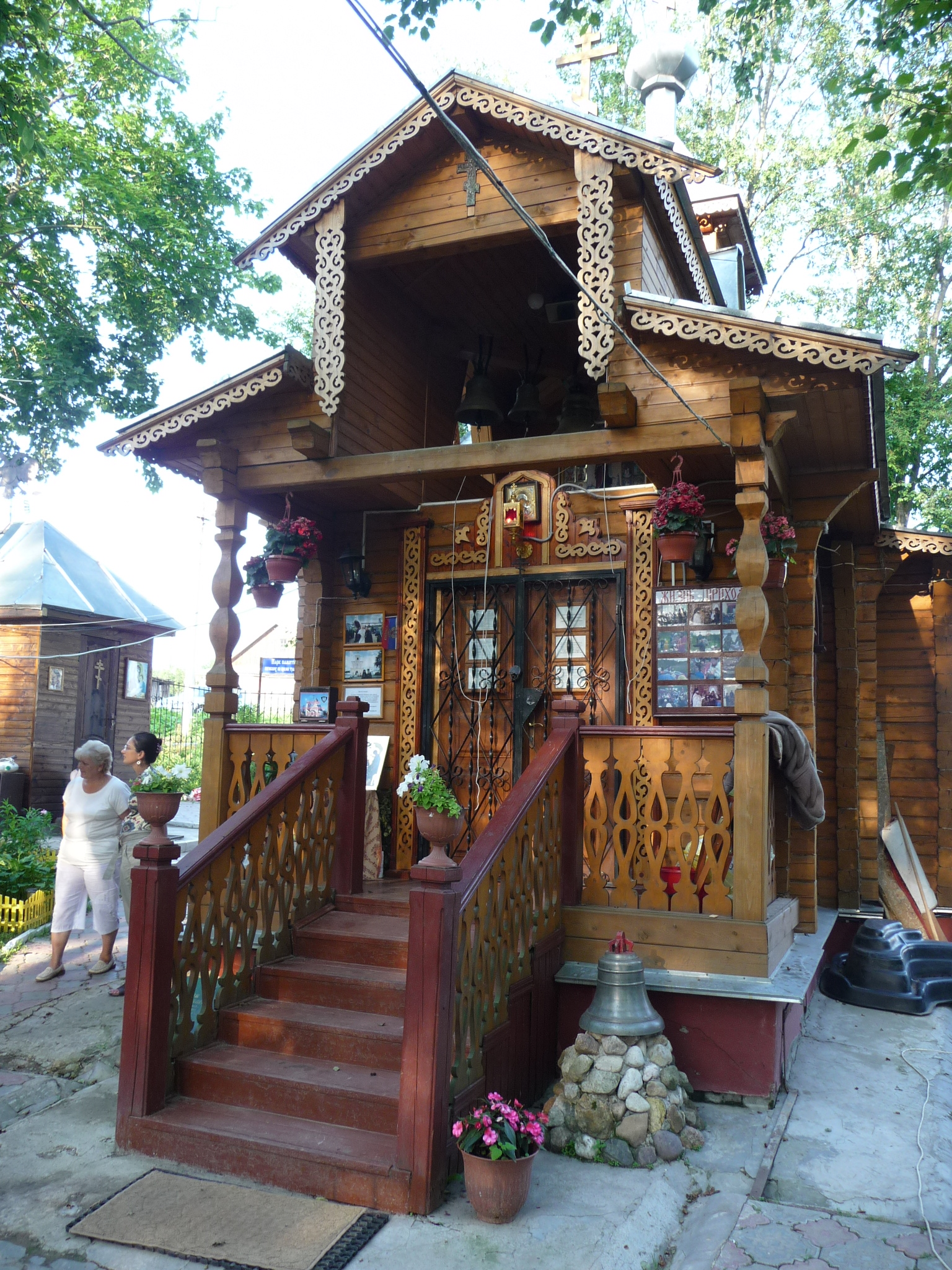
Wooden church

Moscow Oblast has numerous therapeutic and recreational facilities located mainly in western, northwestern and northern parts, and also near Moscow. Of great importance for recreation are forests, which occupy over 40% of the region, as well as horticultural activities. The region has the highest number (over 1 million) of dachas with associated individual gardens. Also numerous are manor complexes, such as those in Abramtsevo, Muranovo, Ostafievo, historical towns (Vereya, Volokolamsk, Dmitrov, Zaraysk, Zvenigorod, Istra, Kolomna, Sergiyev Posad, Serpukhov, etc.), monasteries (Trinity Lavra of St. Sergius, Joseph-Volokolamsk Monastery, Savvino-Storozhevsky Monastery, Nikolo-Ugresh monastery, etc.), and museums (Chekhov museum in Melikhovo, Tchaikovsky museum in Klin, Serpukhov Historical and Art Museum, etc.). The oldest surviving building is the Kamenskoye Church.

== Demographics ==
Historical population
Year	Pop.	±%
1897	1,391,990	—
1926	4,570,836	+228.4%
1959	5,863,003	+28.3%
1970	5,774,529	−1.5%
1979	6,359,385	+10.1%
1989	6,693,623	+5.3%
2002	6,618,538	−1.1%
2010	7,095,120	+7.2%
2021	8,524,665	+20.1%
2025	8,766,594	+2.8%
Source: Census data, estimate

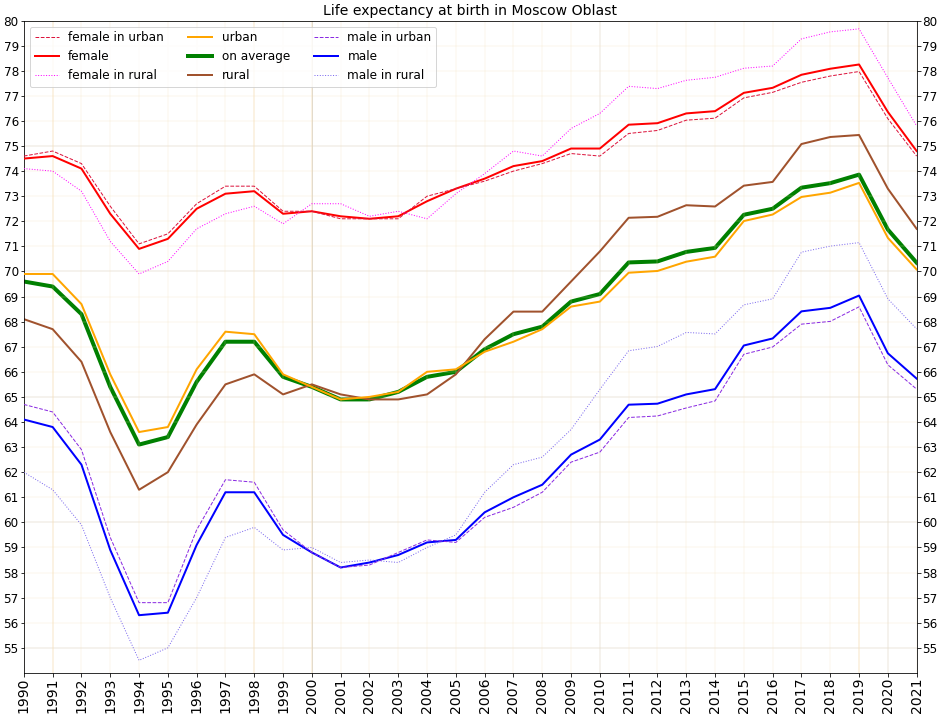
Life expectancy at birth in Moscow Oblast

After the population decline from 6,693,623 as of the 1989 Census to 6,618,538 in the 2002 Census the population of the oblast grew to 7,095,120 (2010 Census). It increased further to 8,524,665 according to the 2021 Census despite the fact that some parts of its territory were ceded to Moscow. The average population density, at 190 inhabitants/km^{2} (2021), is the largest in Russia, due to a high proportion of urban population (78.5% in 2021). The highest density occurs in and around Moscow (Lyubertsy, Balashikha, Khimki, Krasnogorsk, etc.) and the lowest – about 20 people/km^{2} – is in the outlying areas of Lotoshinsky, Shakhovskoy, Mozhaysk and Meshchersk lowlands.

=== Ethnic groups in Moscow Oblast (2021 Census) ===
Ethnicity	Population	Percentage
Russians	6,873,903	92.1%
Armenians	70,199	0.9%
Ukrainians	54,224	0.7%
Tatars	46,066	0.6%
Uzbeks	39,656	0.5%
Tajiks	37,741	0.5%
Azerbaijanis	21,258	0.3%
Belarusians	15,673	0.2%
Kyrgyz	14,986	0.2%
Moldovans	12,811	0.2%
Others	273,958	3.8%
Ethnicity not stated	1,064,190	–

=== Vital statistics ===
Vital statistics for 2024:

- Births: 71,434 (8.3 per 1,000)
- Deaths: 96,608 (11.2 per 1,000)

Total fertility rate (2024):
1.34 children per woman

Life expectancy (2021):
Total — 70.35 years (male — 65.73, female — 74.80)

=== Religion ===
Religion in Moscow Oblast as of 2012 (Sreda Arena Atlas)
Russian Orthodoxy	45.5%
Other Orthodox	2.4%
Old Believers	0.5%
Other Christians	3.3%
Islam	2.1%
Rodnovery and other native faiths	0.7%
Spiritual but not religious	29.4%
Atheism and irreligion	8.7%
Other and undeclared	7.4%

According to a 2012 survey 45.5% of the population of Moscow Oblast adheres to the Russian Orthodox Church, 3% are unaffiliated generic Christians, 2% are Orthodox Christian believers who do not belong to church or belong to non-Russian Orthodox churches, 1% are adherents of Rodnovery (the Slavic folk religious movement) and 1% to Islam. In addition, 29% of the population declares to be "spiritual but not religious", 9% is Non-Religious, and 9.5% follows other religions or did not give an answer to the question.

== Administrative and municipal divisions ==

Administratively, the oblast is divided into 38 cities/towns under oblast jurisdiction and 36 administrative districts, consisting of 46 towns of district significance, 72 urban-type settlements, and 6,119 rural localities.

As of 2011, Moscow Oblast is municipally subdivided into 38 urban okrugs and 36 municipal districts, which consist of 114 urban settlements and 193 rural settlements.

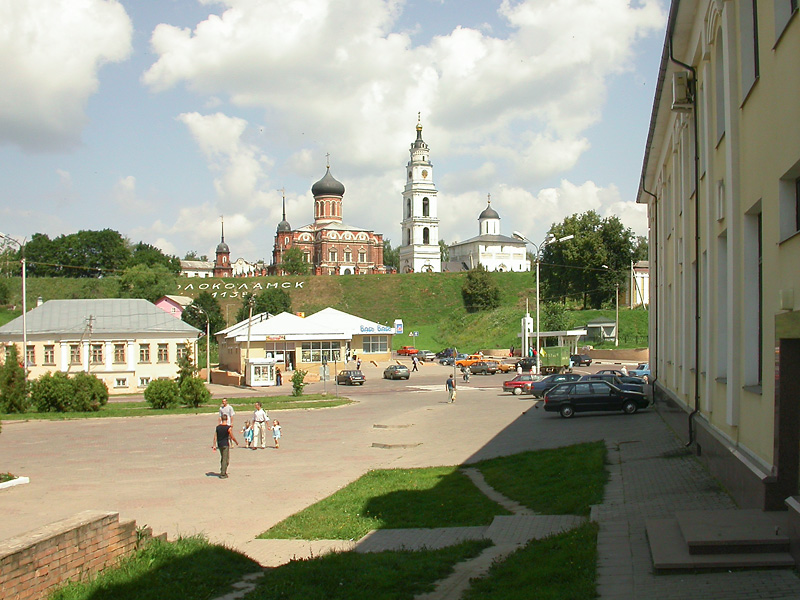
Center of Volokolamsk in 2003

The three largest cities of the oblast are Balashikha (215,494), Khimki (207,425), and Podolsk (186,961). Most other towns have ten to fifty thousand people. The smallest town is Vereya in Naro-Fominsky District with a population of 4,957 (2002 census). Among the urban-type settlements, the largest is Nakhabino (36,546) followed by Tomilino (30,605). The oldest populated place in the oblast is Volokolamsk, first mentioned in 1135; slightly younger towns are Zvenigorod (1152), Dmitrov (1154), and Kolomna (1177).

The city of Baikonur in Kazakhstan also belongs administratively to the oblast, as part of Odintsovsky District.

The most intensive formation of towns occurred in 1938–1940. The youngest towns are Golitsyno and Kubinka. They existed for quite some time, but were granted town status only in 2004. Some recent towns separated from the other towns, such as Yubileyny and Peresvet.

New projects have been announced at the beginning of the 21st century. One of them is Rublyovo-Arkhangelsk, which is designed for 30,000 inhabitants with high income and is called by the media the "city for millionaires". Another is "Great Domodedovo, 30 kilometers (19 mi) south of the Moscow Ring Road, which is designed for 450,000 residents. The new city A101 was designed for 300,000 residents in 2009 and the sale of its land in Leninsky District has already begun; the city's construction is planned to take thirty-five years.

A part of Moscow Oblast's former territory, mainly to the southwest of the city of Moscow, was merged with the federal city of Moscow on July 1, 2012.

The housing stock of the oblast is approximately 125 million square meters. Almost all the houses are equipped with water supply, sewerage, gas, central heating and hot water. However, the telephone network is underdeveloped in rural areas. In the competition for the most comfortable city of 2006 in the Moscow Oblast the winner was Kolomna followed by Balashikha (for cities with population over 100,000) and Vidnoye (<100,000) and then by Mytishchi and Noginsk.

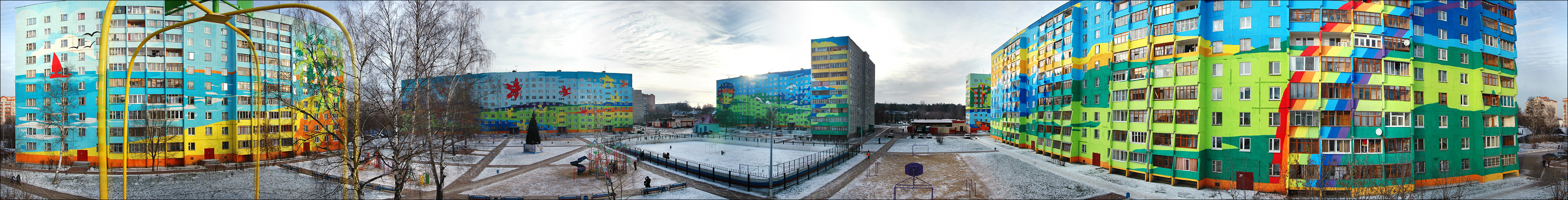
Residential district in Ramenskoye

== Sister regions ==
- Bratislava, Slovakia
- Chüy Region, Kyrgyzstan
- Île-de-France, France
- Jiangsu, China
- Ljubljana, Slovenia
- Palembang, Indonesia
- Buenos Aires Province, Argentina

=== Partner regions ===
Moscow Oblast cooperates with:

- Ahal Region, Turkmenistan (1995)

== See also ==
- List of rural localities in Moscow Oblast
