= Thermal Power Plant 27 =

Heat and power plant in Mytishchinsky, Moscow, Russia

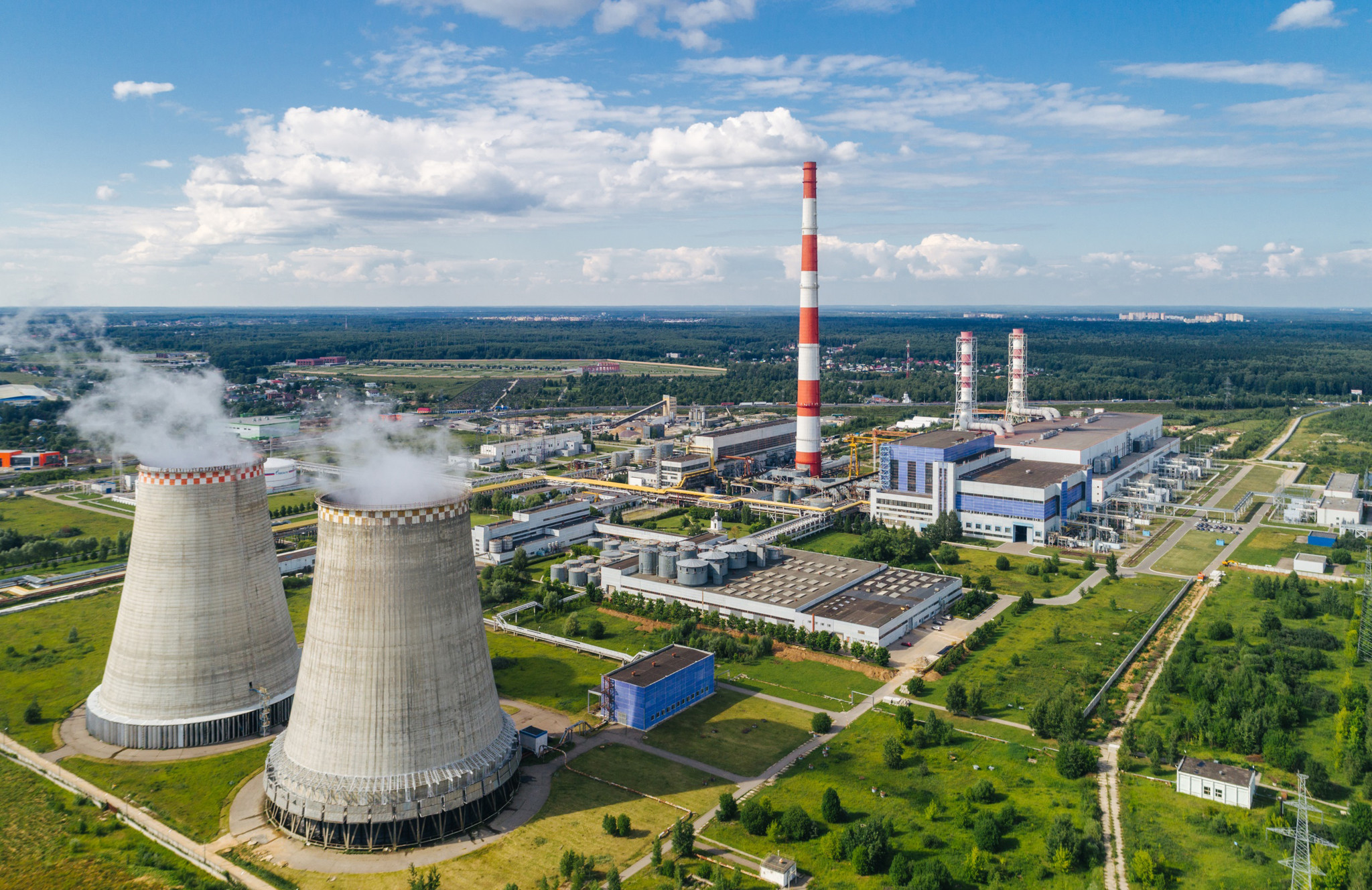
- Official name: ТЭЦ-27 «Северная»
- Country: Russia
- Location: Chelobityevo, Mytishchinsky District, Moscow Oblast
- Coordinates: 55°54′58″N 37°41′16″E
- Status: Operational
- Construction began: 1987
- Commission date: 1992
- Owner: Mosenergo

Thermal power station
- Primary fuel: Natural gas
- Combined cycle?: Yes
- Cogeneration?: Yes
- Thermal capacity: 2,180 MW/h

Power generation
- Units operational: 2 X 80 MW; 2 X 450 MW
- Make and model: LMZ; Power Machines
- Nameplate capacity: 1,060 MW

External links
- Website: www.mosenergo.ru/about/present/branch/hpp-27/
- Commons: Related media on Commons

Thermal Power Plant 27 Severnaya (Russian: ТЭЦ-27 «Северная») is a combined heat and power plant located in the village of Chelobityevo in Mytishchinsky District of Moscow Oblast, Russia. It is owned and operated by Mosenergo. It provides heat and power to Mytishchi, as well as to Northern and North-Eastern Administrative Okrugs of Moscow.

The decision to build the power plant was taken in 1980s. However, due to opposition of the local population the construction was postponed. The first unit became operational in 1996 and the second unit in 1998. The third unit was added in 2007 and the fourth unit in 2008.

== 2019 incident ==
On July 11, 2019, a major fire broke out at the power station. According to eyewitnesses and video footage, the fire was caused by an explosion, and the flames were said to be close to 50 meters tall.
