= Shapkino, Mozhaysky District, Moscow Oblast =

Shapkino Шапкино
- Village
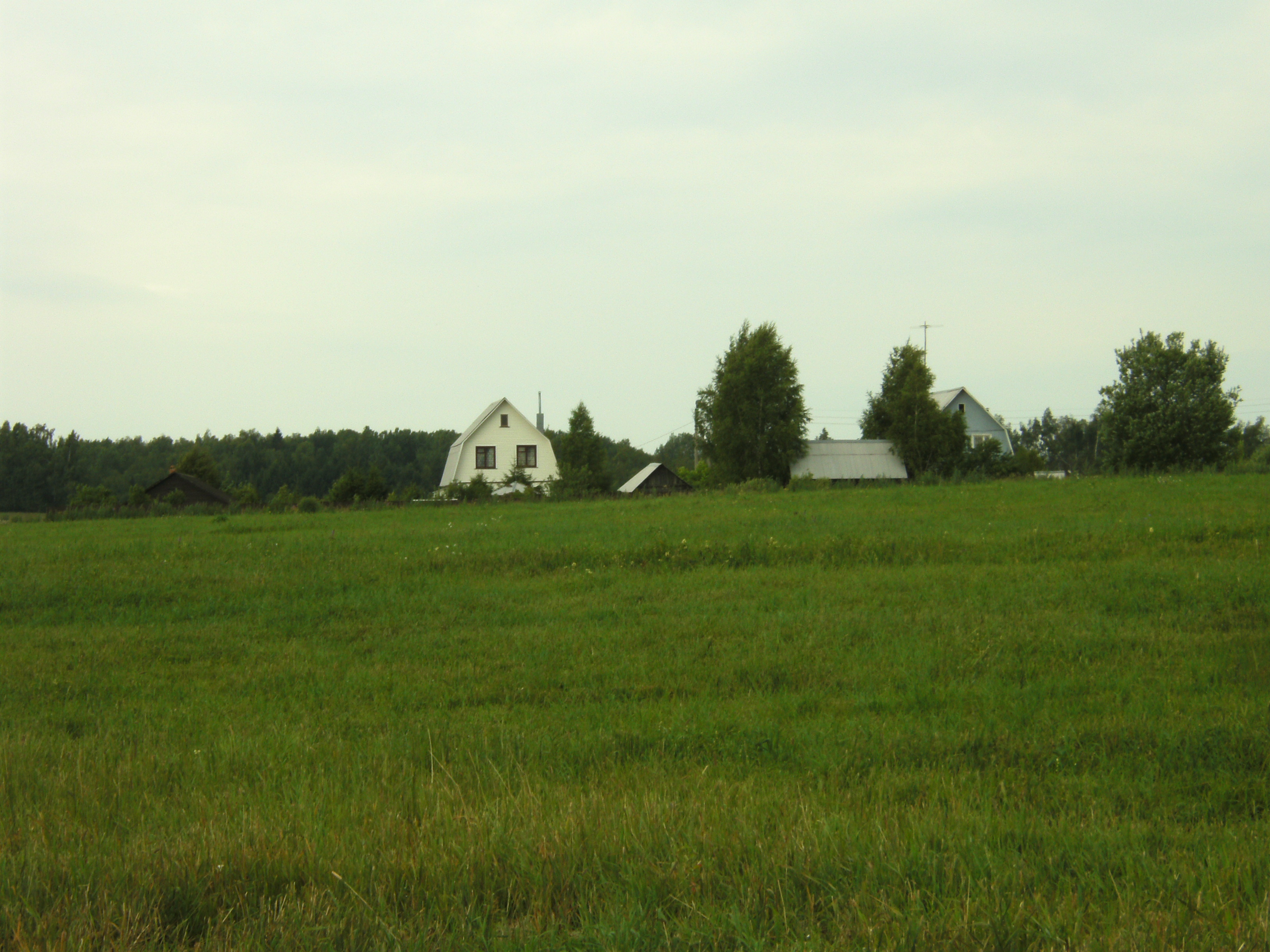
- Dachas in the village, 2014

- Location within Moscow Oblast Location within Russia
- Coordinates: 55°29′10″N 35°29′30″E
- Country: Russia
- Region: Moscow Oblast
- District: Mozhaysky District
- Time zone: UTC+3:00

Shapkino (Russian: Шапкино) is a rural locality (a selo) in Zamoshinskoye Rural Settlement of Mozhaysky District, Moscow Oblast, Russia. Population: 10 (2010 census); 4 (2002 census);
