= Armorial of Moscow Oblast =

Coat of arms of districts, cities and towns

The article lists the coat of arms of Moscow Oblast, grouped into the regions territorial divisions.

== Coat of Arms ==
Coat of arms of Moscow Oblast

== Districts ==
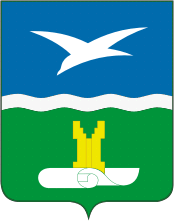
Chekhovsky District

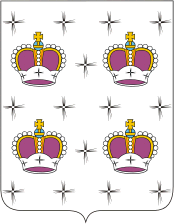
Dmitrovsky District

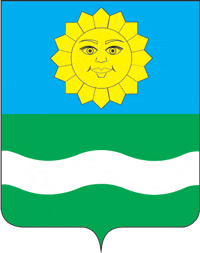
Istrinsky District

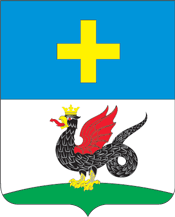
Kashirsky District

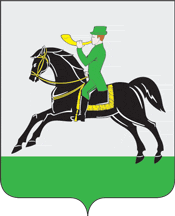
Klinsky District

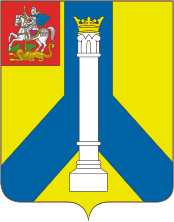
Kolomensky District

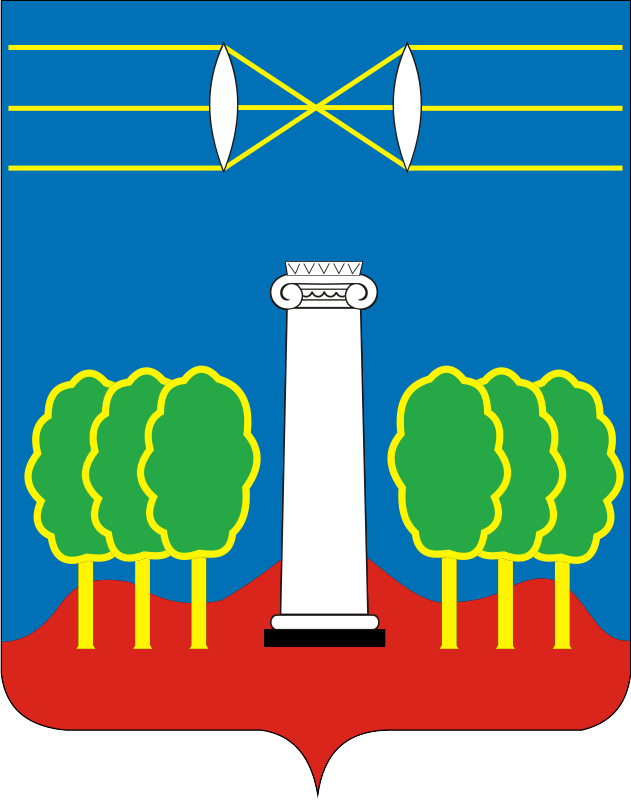
Krasnogorsky District

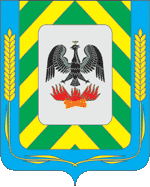
Leninsky District

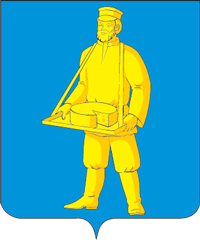
Lotoshinsky District

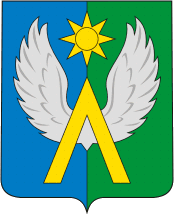
Lukhovitsky District

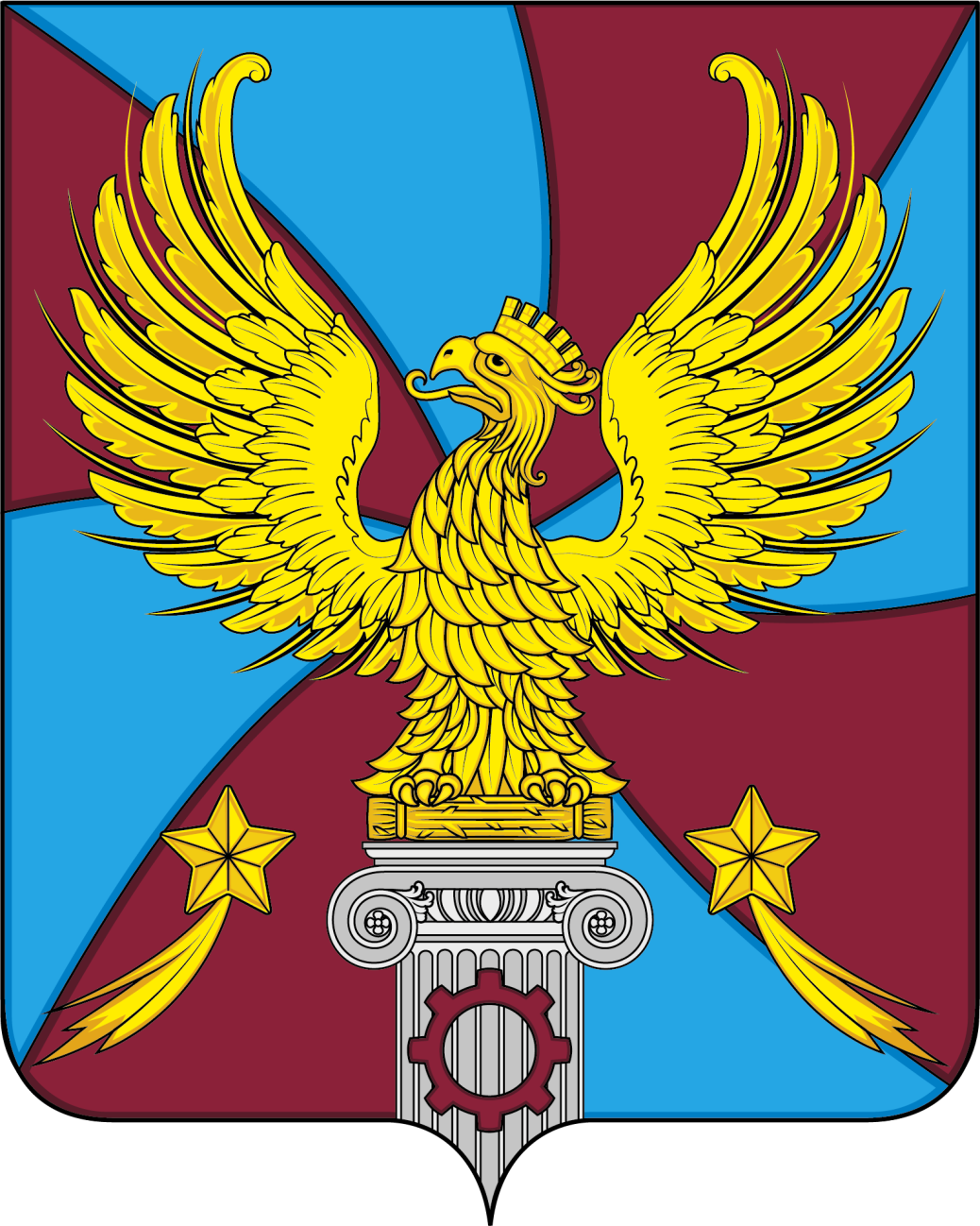
Lyuberetsky District

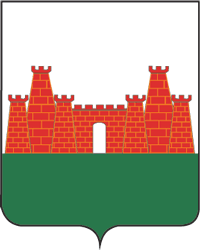
Mozhaysky District

Mytishchinsky District

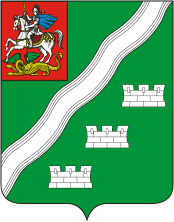
Naro-Fominsky District

Noginsky District

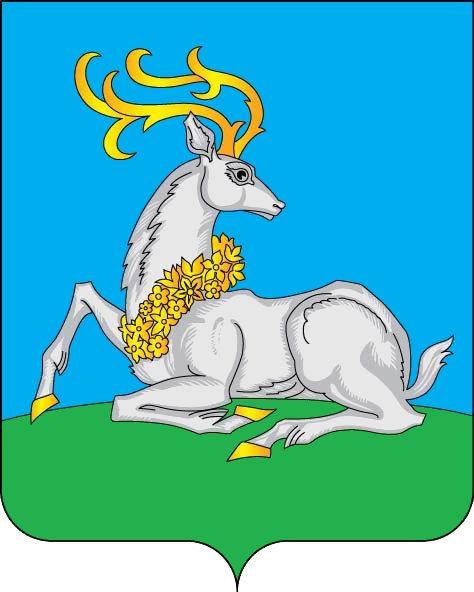
Odintsovsky District

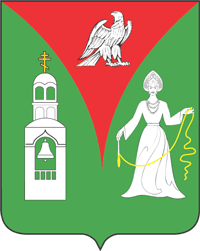
Orekhovo-Zuyevsky District

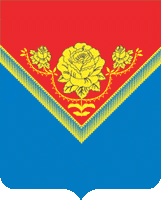
Pavlovo-Posadsky District

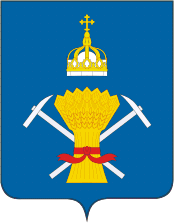
Podolsky District

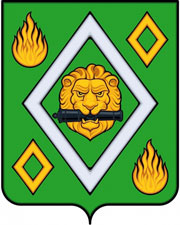
Pushkinsky District

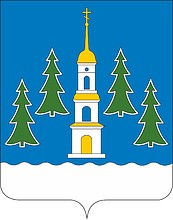
Ramensky District

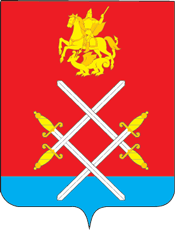
Ruzsky District

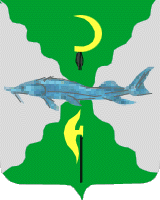
Serebryano-Prudsky District

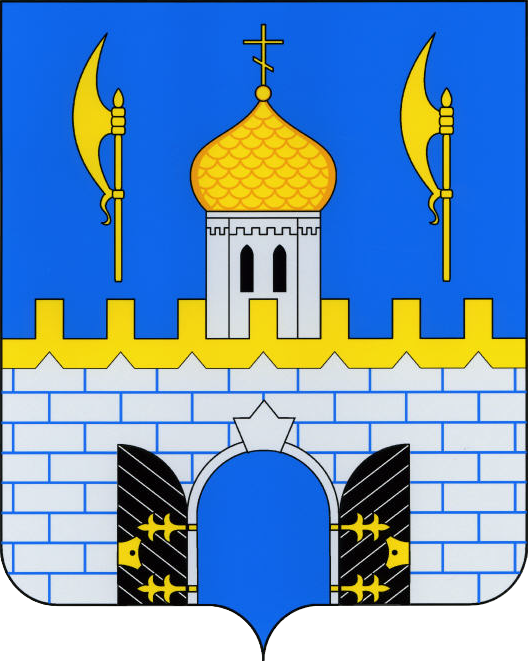
Sergiyevo-Posadsky District

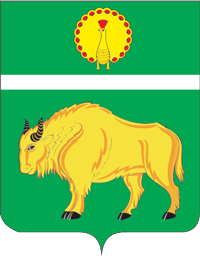
Serpukhovsky District

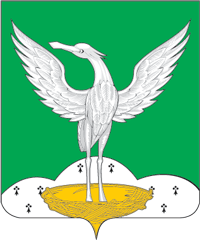
Shakhovskoy District

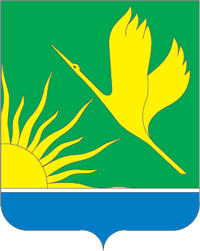
Shatursky District

Shchyolkovsky District

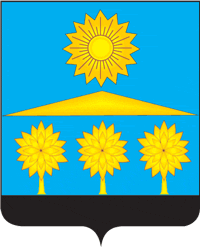
Solnechnogorsky District

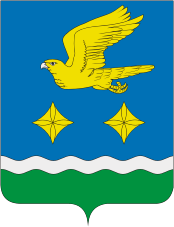
Stupinsky District

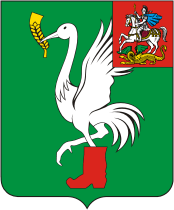
Taldomsky District

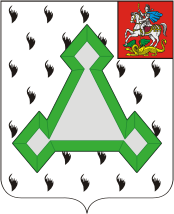
Volokolamsky District

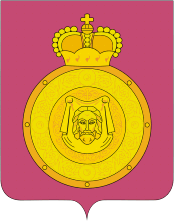
Voskresensky District

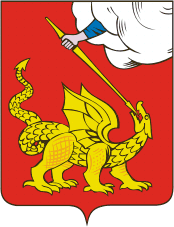
Yegoryevsky District

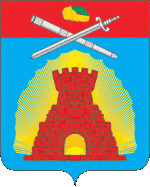
Zaraysky District

== Cities and towns ==
Aprelevka

Balashikha

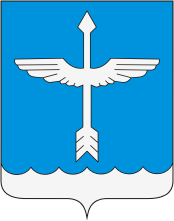
Beloozyorsky

Bronnitsy

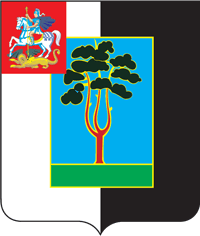
Chernogolovka

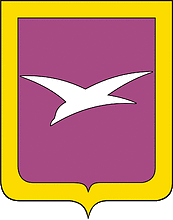
Chekhov

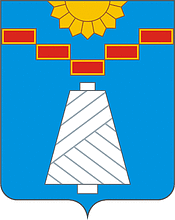
Dedovsk

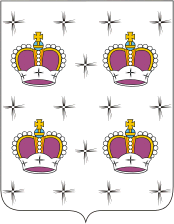
Dmitrov

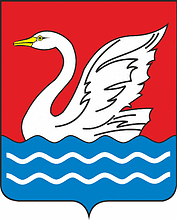
Dolgoprudny

Domodedovo

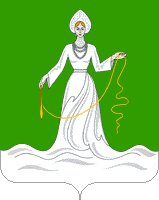
Drezna

Dubna

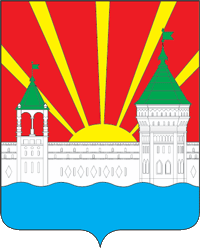
Dzerzhinsky

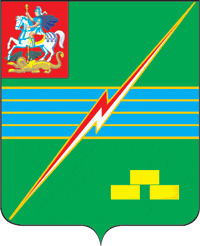
Elektrogorsk

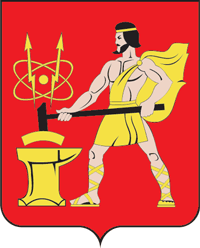
Elektrostal

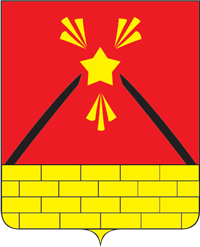
Elektrougli

Fryazino

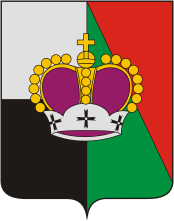
Golitsyno

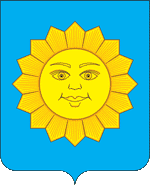
Istra

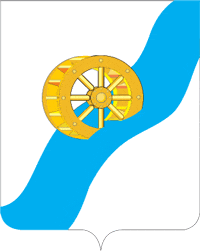
Ivanteyevka

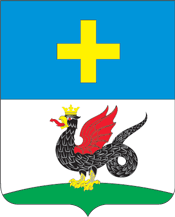
Kashira

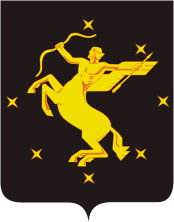
Khimki

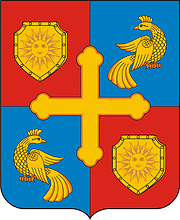
Khotkovo

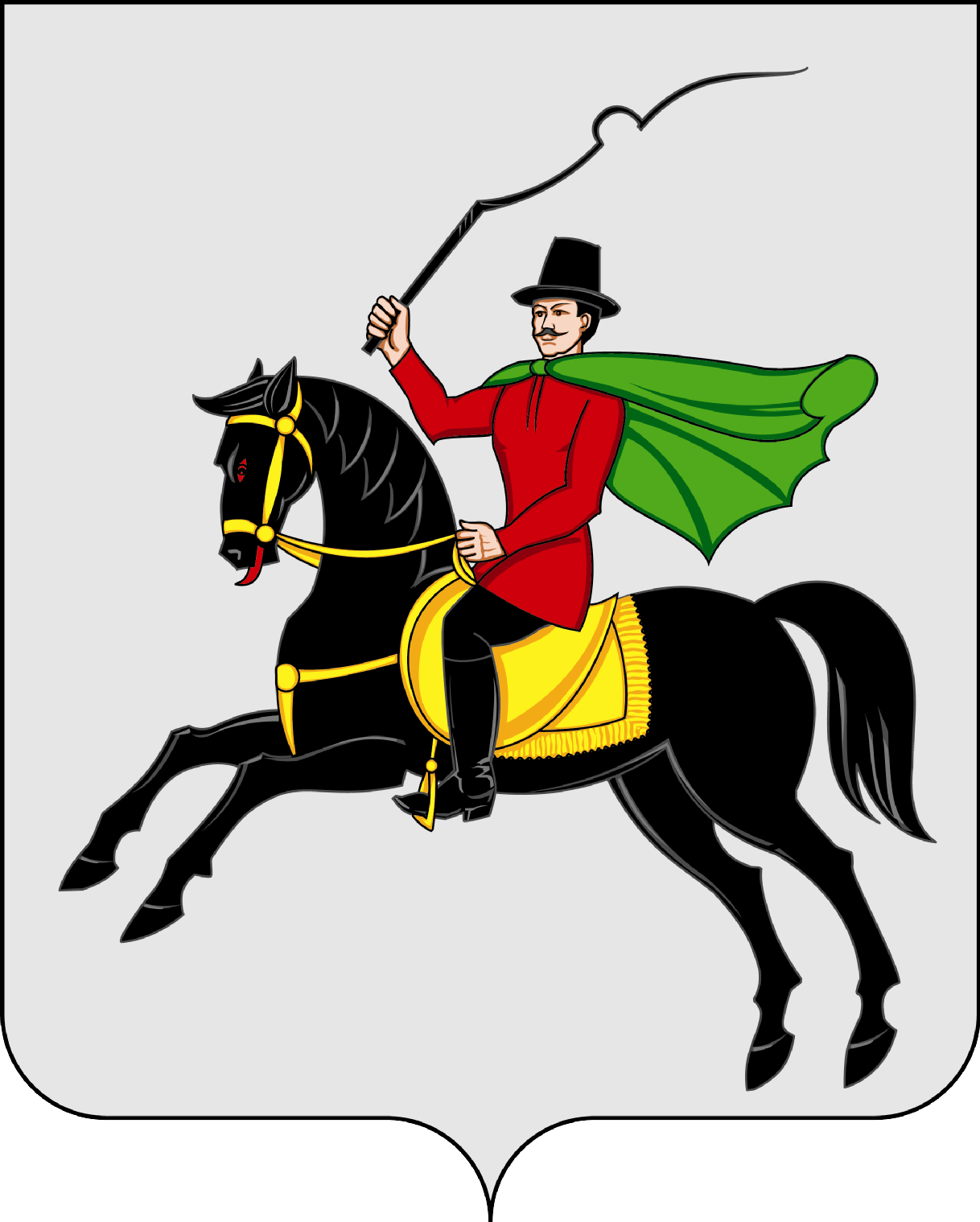
Klin

Kolomna

Korolyov

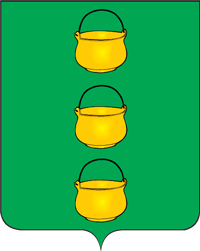
Kotelniki

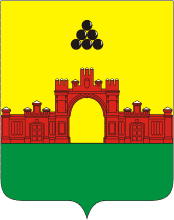
Krasnoarmeysk

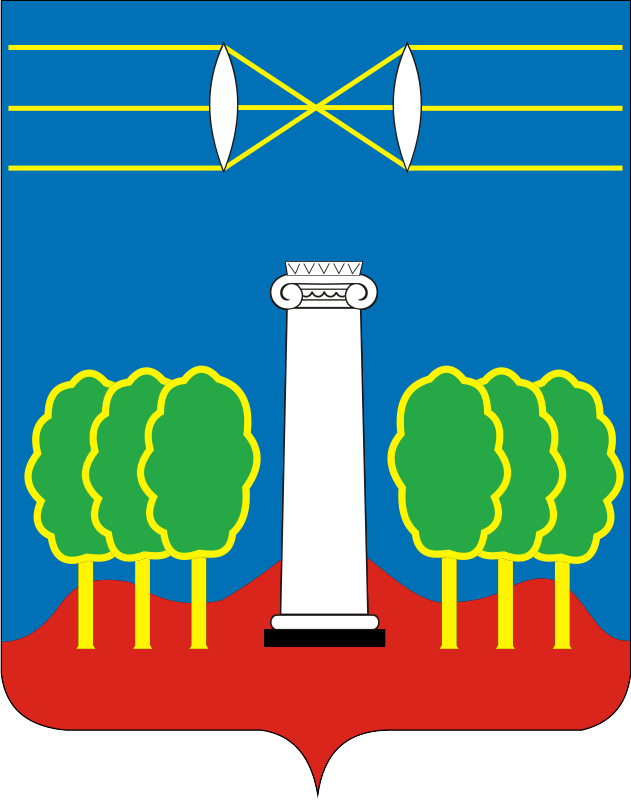
Krasnogorsk

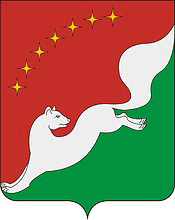
Krasnozavodsk

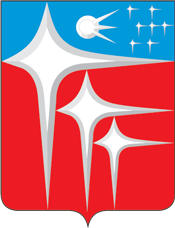
Krasnoznamensk

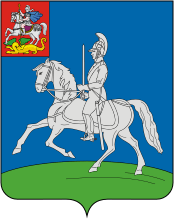
Kubinka

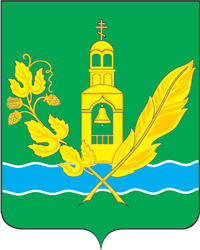
Kurovskoye

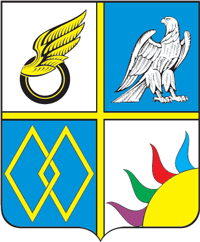
Likino-Dulyovo

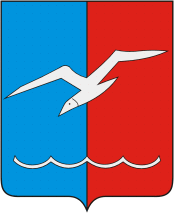
Lobnya

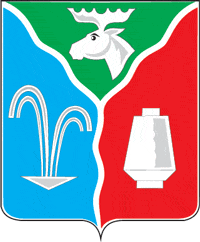
Losino-Petrovsky

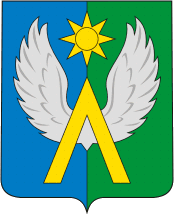
Lukhovitsy

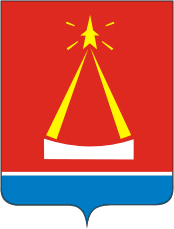
Lytkarino

Lyubertsy

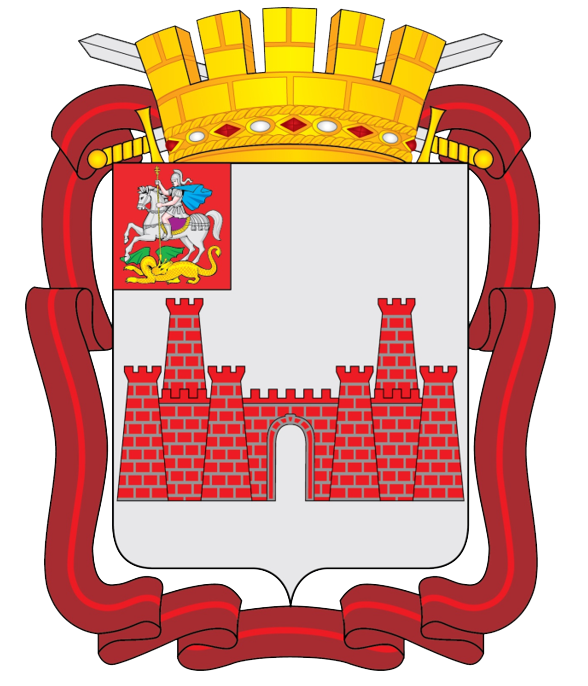
Mozhaysk

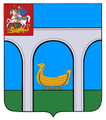
Mytishchi

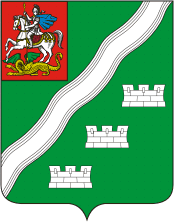
Naro-Fominsk

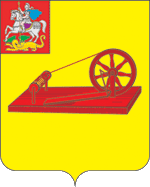
Noginsk

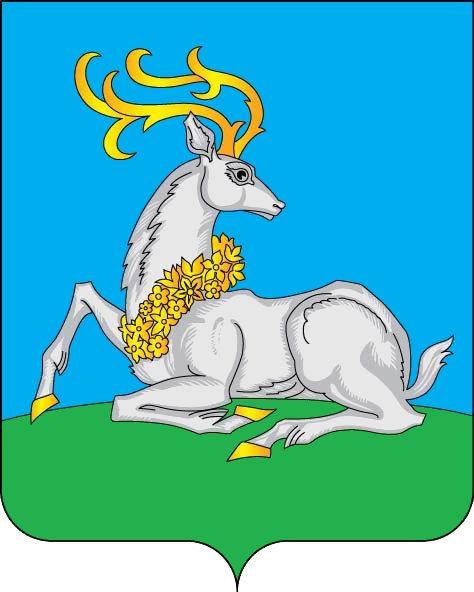
Odintsovo

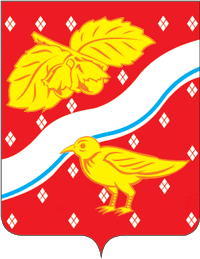
Orekhovo-Zuyevo

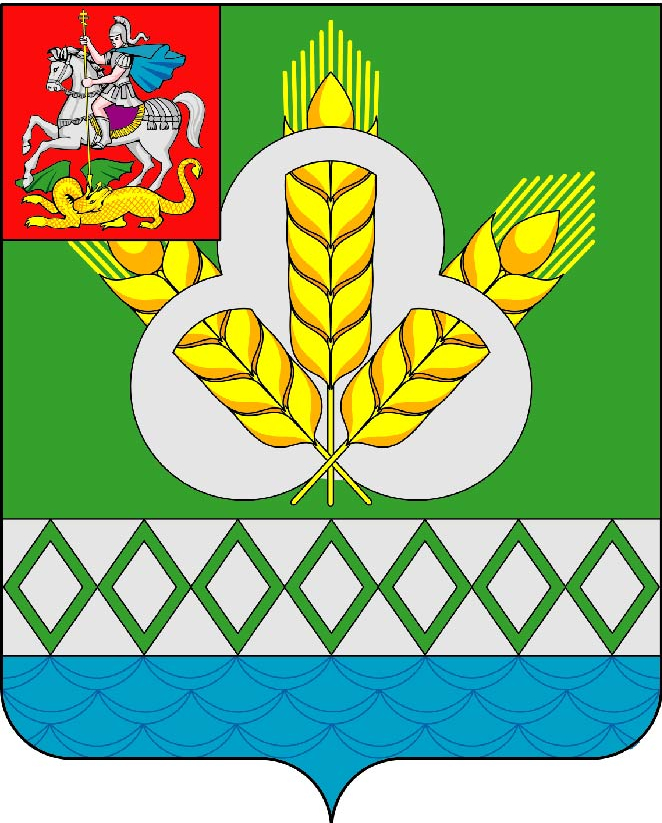
Ozyory

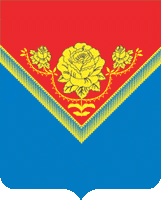
Pavlovsky Posad

Peresvet

Podolsk

Protvino

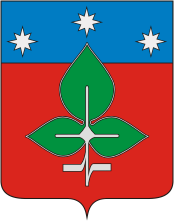
Pushchino

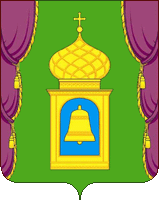
Pushkino

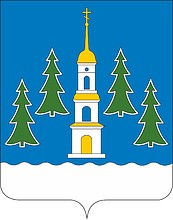
Ramenskoye

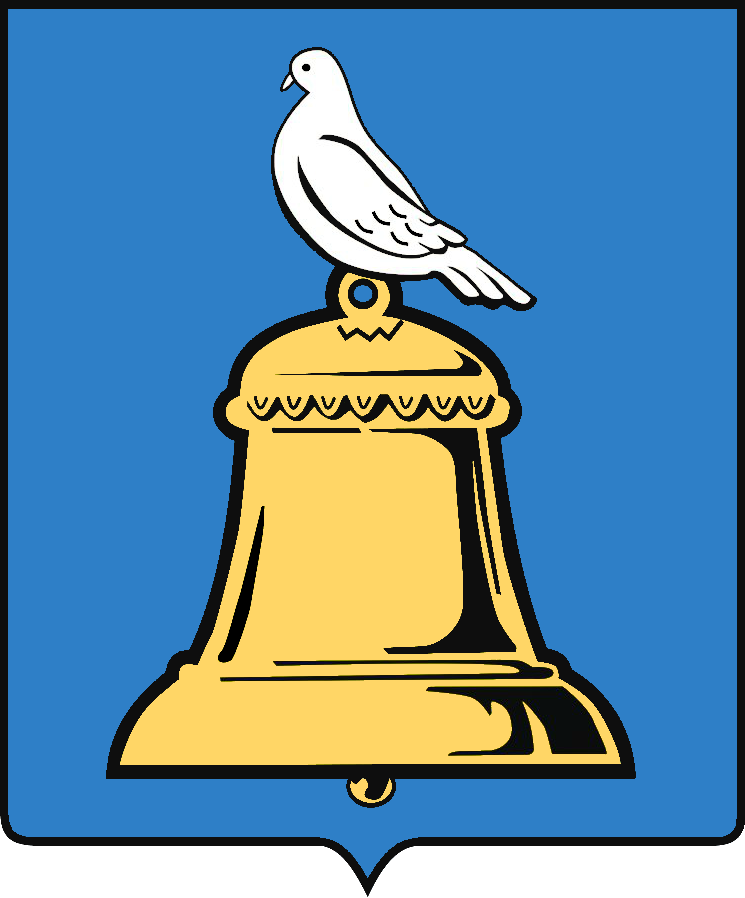
Reutov

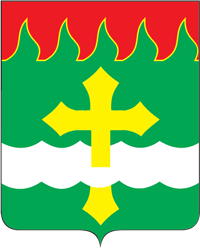
Roshal

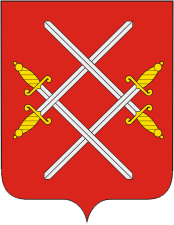
Ruza

Sergiyev Posad

Serpukhov

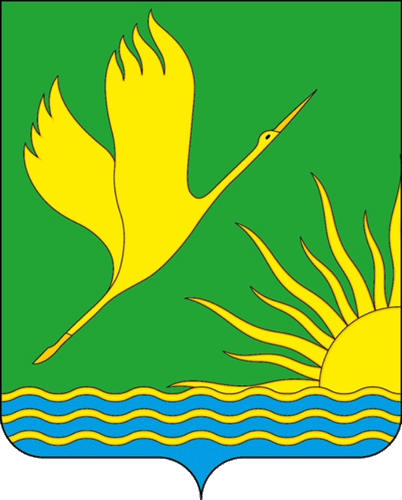
Shatura

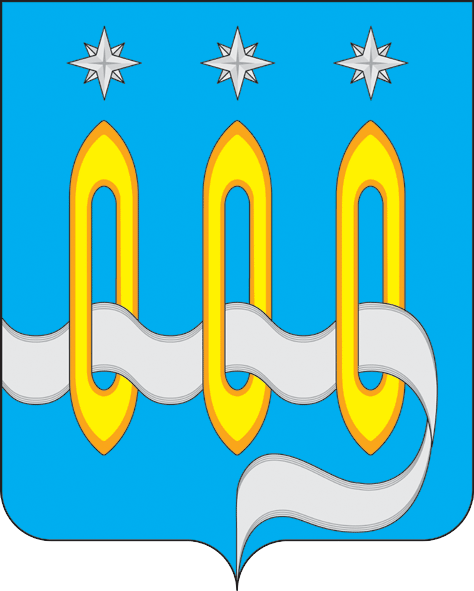
Shchyolkovo

Solnechnogorsk

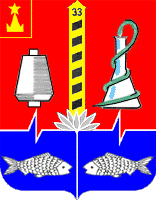
Staraya Kupavna

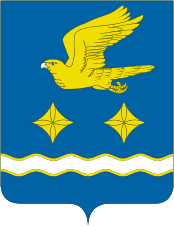
Stupino

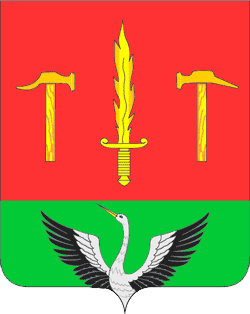
Taldom

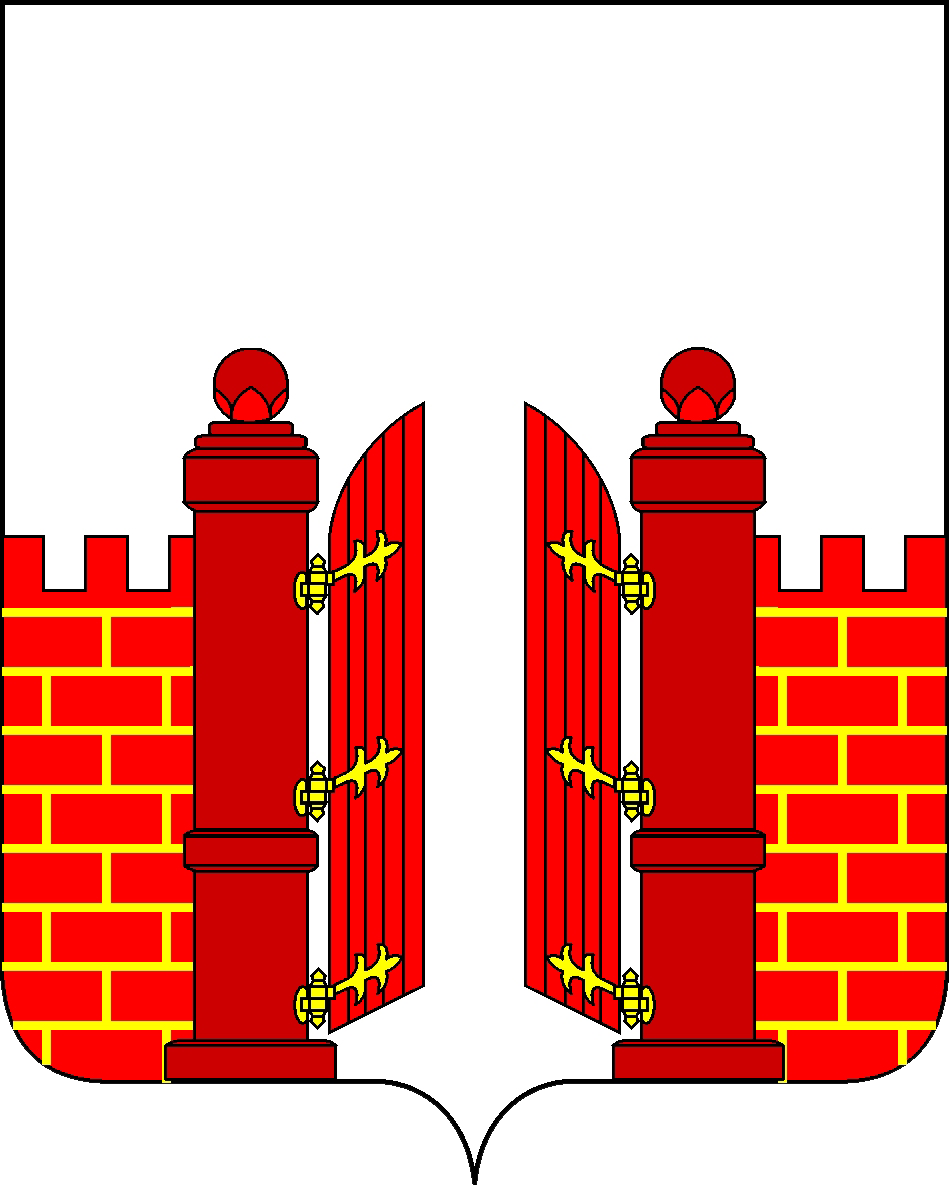
Vereya

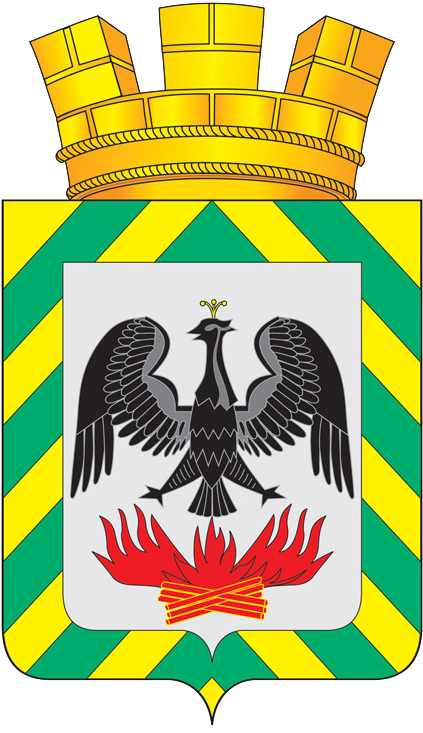
Vidnoye

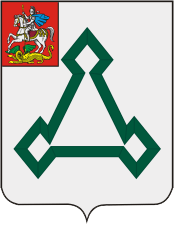
Volokolamsk

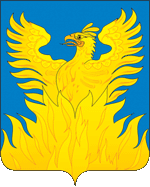
Voskresensk

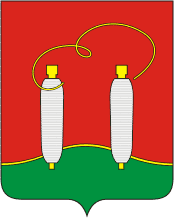
Vysokovsk

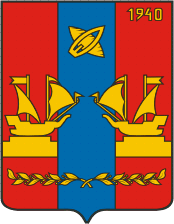
Yakhroma

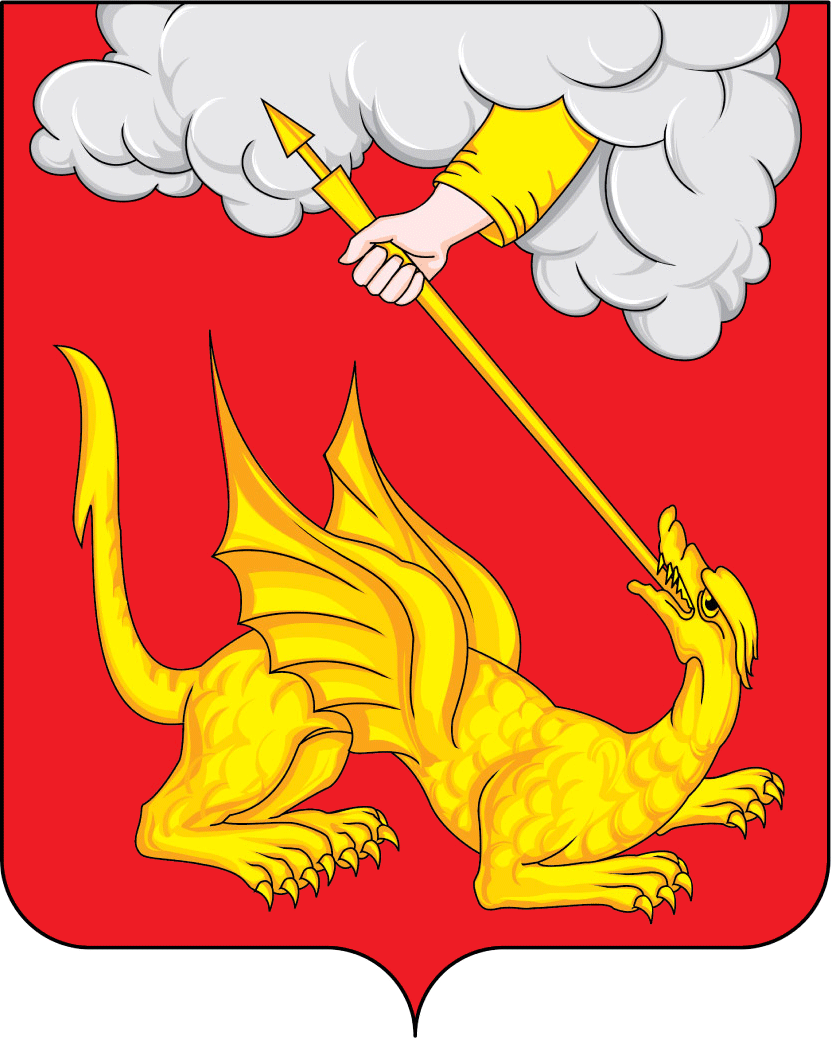
Yegoryevsk

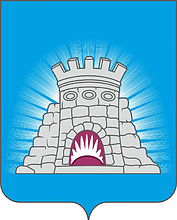
Zaraysk

Zhukovsky

== Closed cities ==
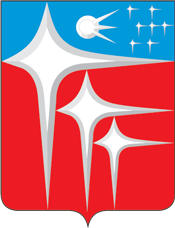
Krasnoznamensk

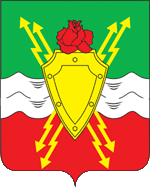
Molodyozhnyi

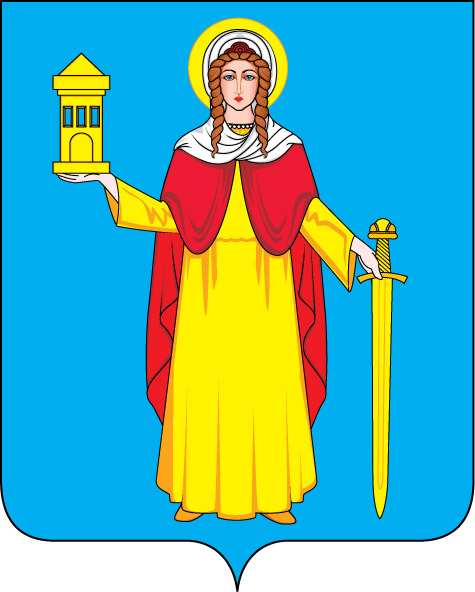
Vlasikha

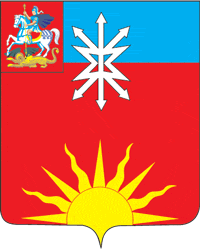
Voskhod

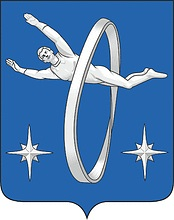
Zvyozdny gorodok

== Urban-type settlements ==
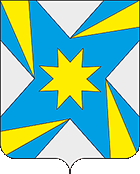
Andreyevka

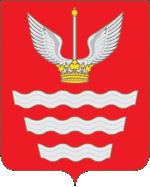
Ashukino

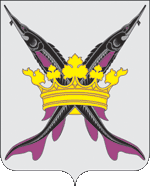
Beloomut

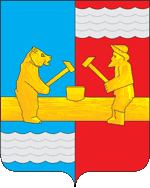
Bogorodskoye

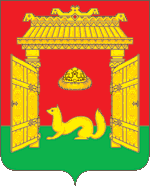
Bolshiye Dvory

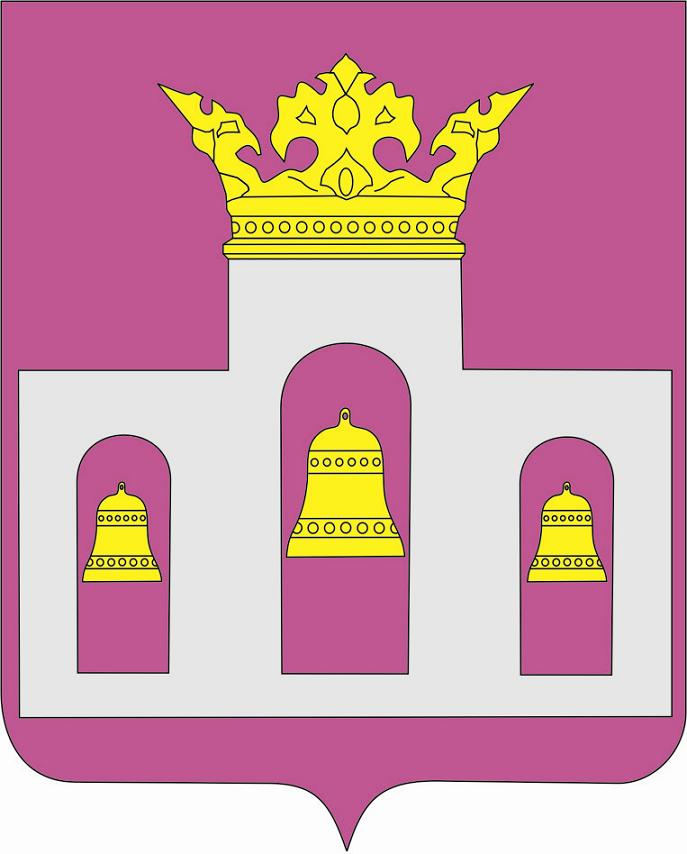
Bolshiye Vyazyomy

Bykovo

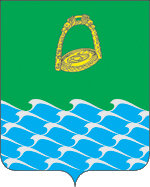
Cherkizovo

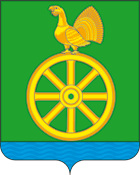
Cherusti

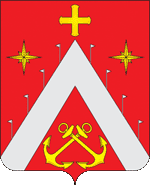
Dedenevo

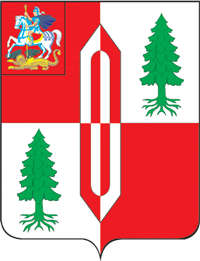
Fryanovo

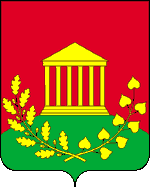
Gorki Leninskiye

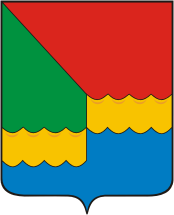
Iksha

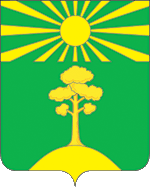
Ilyinsky

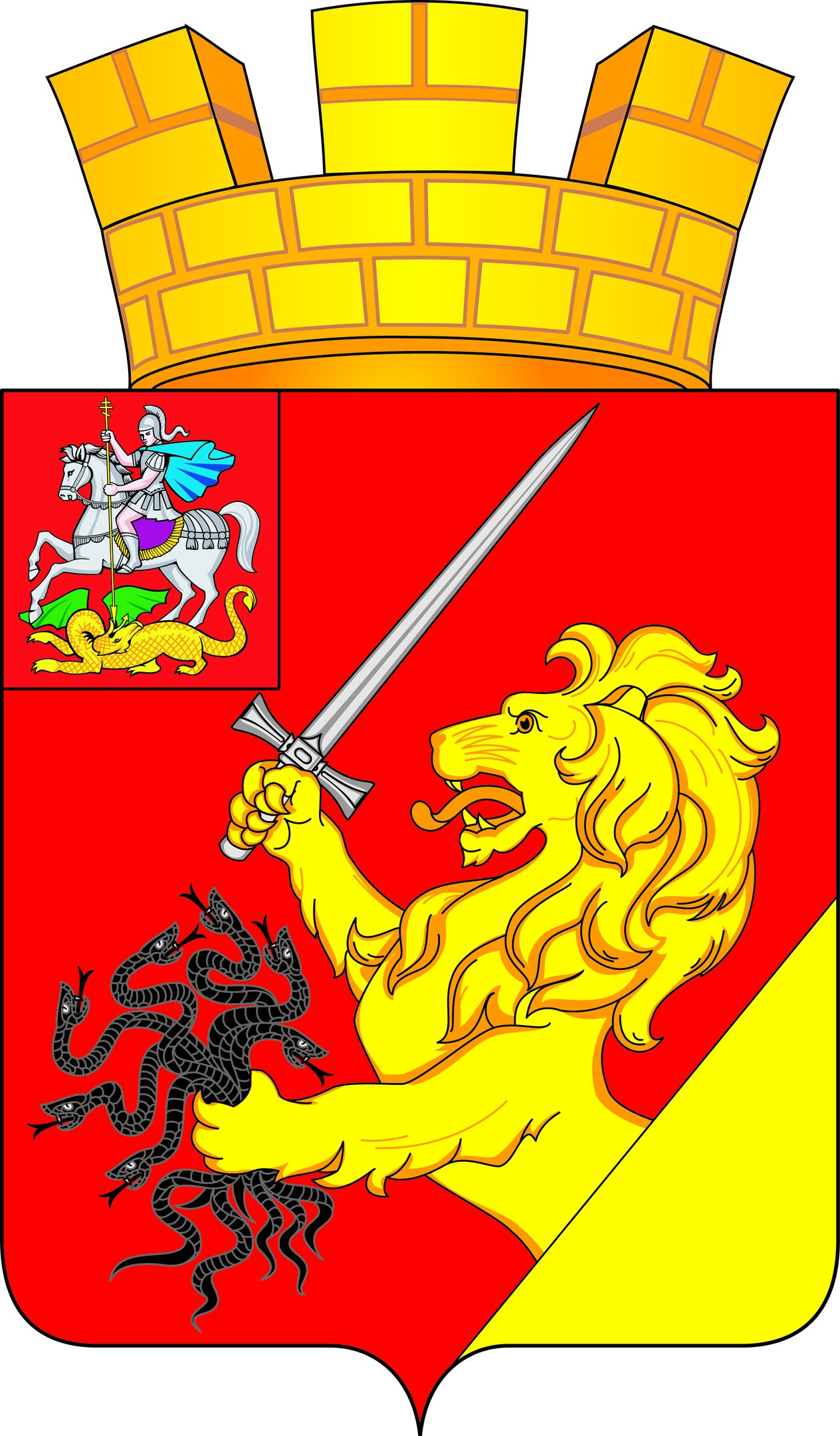
Imeni Tsyurupy

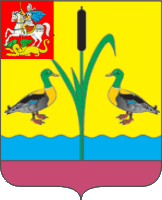
Imeni Vorovskogo

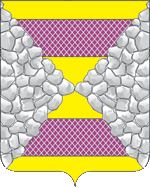
Khorlovo

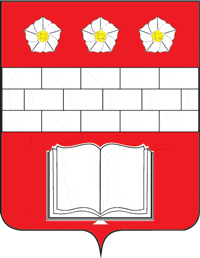
Kraskovo

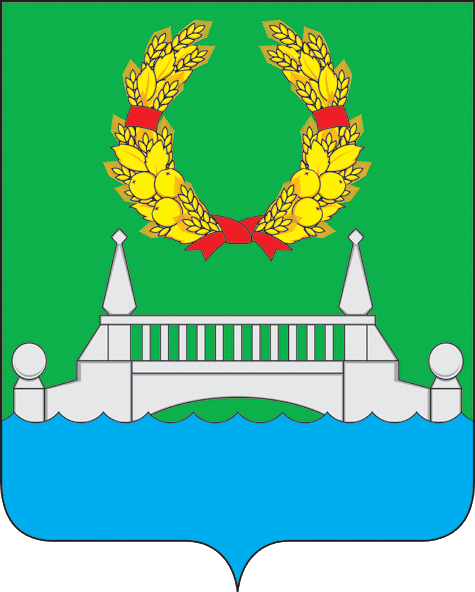
Kratovo

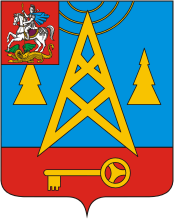
Lesnoy

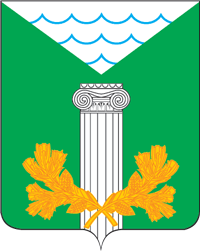
Malakhovka

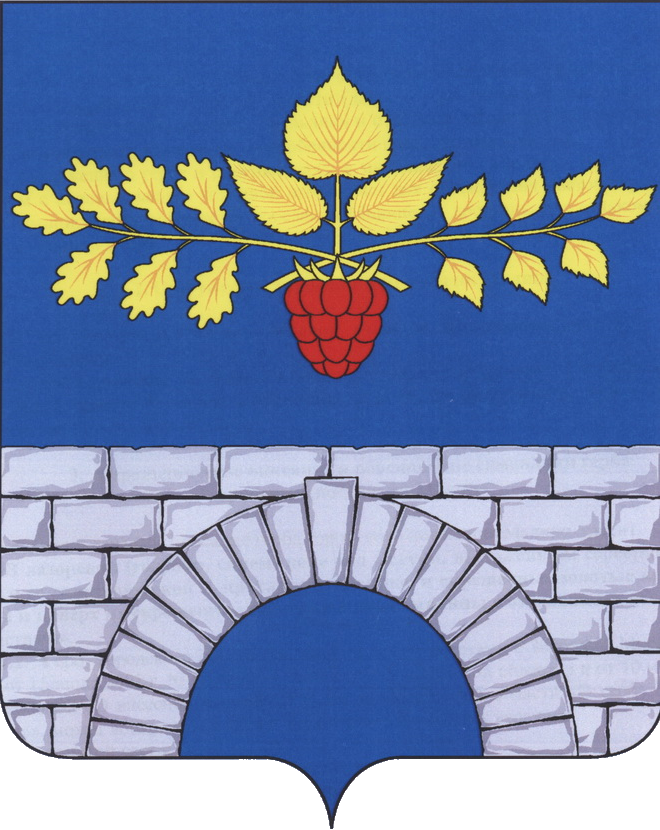
Malino

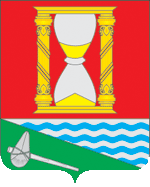
Mendeleyevo

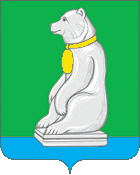
Misheronsky

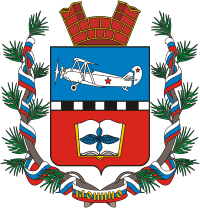
Monino

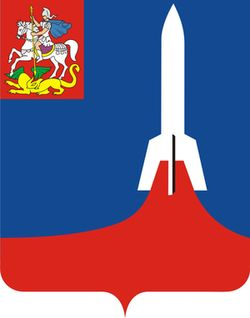
Nakhabino

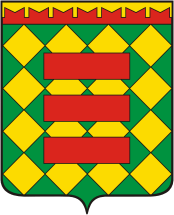
Nekrasovsky

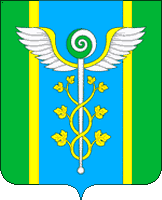
Novoivanovskoye

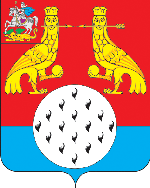
Obolensk

Obukhovo

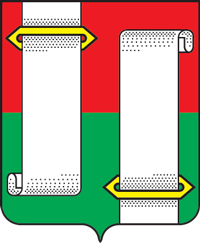
Oktyabrsky

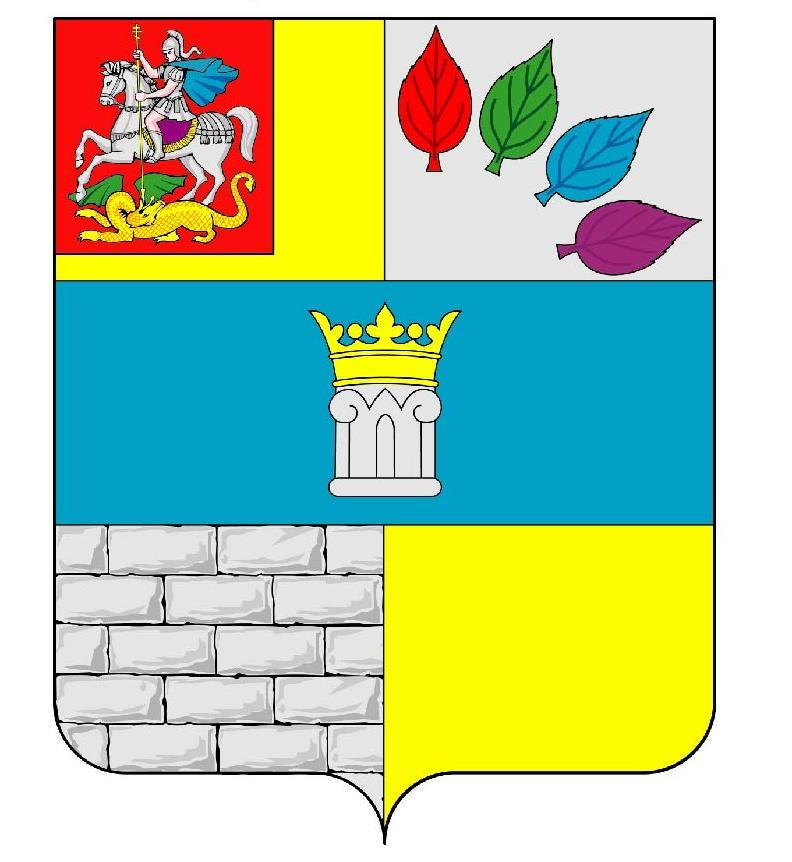
Peski

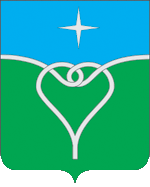
Povarovo

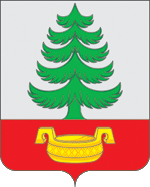
Pravdinsky

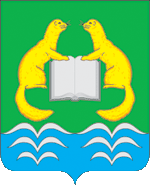
Rodniki

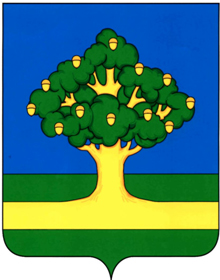
Rzhavki

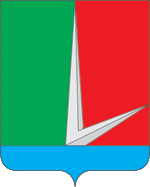
Selyatino

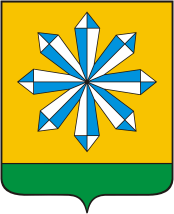
Skoropuskovsky

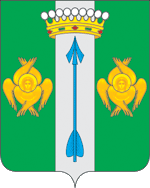
Sofrino

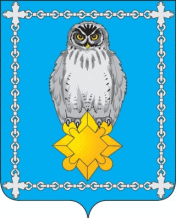
Sychyovo

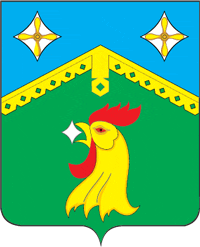
Tomilino

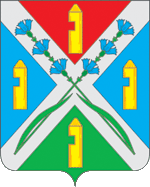
Udelnaya

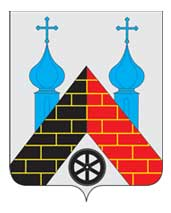
Uvarovka

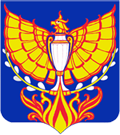
Verbilki

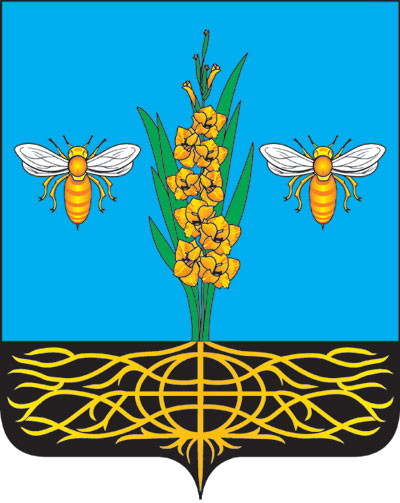
Zagoryansky

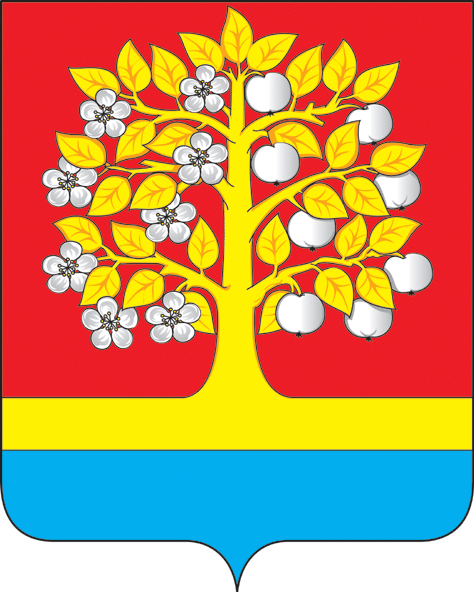
Zaprudnya

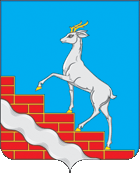
Zarechye

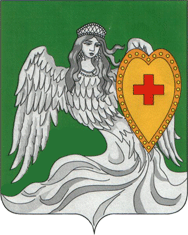
Zelenogradsky

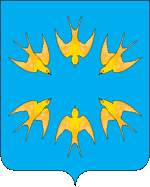
Zhilyovo

== See also ==
- Armorial of Russia
