= Zelenogradsky =

Zelenogradsky (masculine), Zelenogradskaya (feminine), or Zelenogradskoye (neuter) may refer to:

- Zelenogradsky District, a district of Kaliningrad Oblast, Russia
- Zelenograd Administrative Okrug (Zelenogradsky administrativny okrug), an administrative okrug of Moscow, Russia
- Zelenogradsky Urban Okrug, a municipal formation into which Zelenogradsky District in Kaliningrad Oblast, Russia is incorporated
- Zelenogradsky Urban Settlement, a municipal formation into which the Suburban Settlement of Zelenogradsky in Pushkinsky District of Moscow Oblast, Russia is incorporated
- Zelenogradskoye Urban Settlement, a former municipal formation into which the town of district significance of Zelenogradsk in Zelenogradsky District of Kaliningrad Oblast, Russia was incorporated
- Zelenogradsky (urban-type settlement), a suburban settlement in Moscow Oblast, Russia

== See also ==
- Zelenograd (disambiguation)
