= Zimogorye (rural locality) =

Zimogorye (Russian: Зимогорье) is the name of several rural localities in Russia:

- Zimogorye, Moscow Oblast, a village under the administrative jurisdiction of Zelenogradsky Suburban Settlement in Pushkinsky District of Moscow Oblast; 56°06′N 37°53′E
- Zimogorye, Novgorod Oblast, a selo under the administrative jurisdiction of the town of district significance of Valday in Valdaysky District of Novgorod Oblast; 57°58′N 33°17′E

== See also ==
- Zymohiria, a city in Ukraine that is known as Zimogorye in Russian
