= Stephan Krasovitsky =

Russian poet, translator, and journalist (1935–2025)

- Стефан Красовицкий
- Born: Stanislav Yakovlevich Krasovitsky; 1 December 1935; Moscow, Russian SFSR, USSR
- Died: 10 January 2025 (aged 89); Zelenogradsky, Pushkinsky District, Moscow Oblast, Russia
- Education: Moscow State Linguistic University
- Occupation(s): Poet; Translator; Journalist

Signature
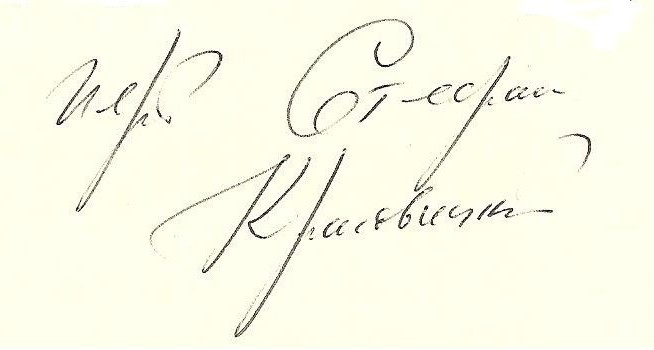

Stanislav (Stephan) Yakovlevich Krasovitsky (Russian: Станисла́в (Стефан) Я́ковлевич Красови́цкий; 1 December 1935 – 10 January 2025) was a Russian poet, translator, journalist and Russian Orthodox priest.

== Life and career ==
Born in Moscow on 1 December 1935, Krasovitsky graduated from the Moscow State Linguistic University with a degree in English. After his studies, he joined Chertkov's group. During the 1970s and 80s, he was an editor for the Orthodox newspaper Fordevind. He emigrated in 1989 and joined the Russian Orthodox Church Outside Russia in New York City. In the 1990s, he was ordained by Vitaly Ustinov. He then moved to France and stayed at the Couvent de la sainte Vierge de Lesna.

In the late 1990s, Krasovitsky returned to Russia and saw the Russian Orthodox Church in Exile abolished in 2000. He was required to submit to his ruling bishop or appear before a spiritual court. He continued his activities, however, though they were not considered part of the Russian Orthodox Church.

Stephan Krasovitsky died in Zelenogradsky on 10 January 2025, at the age of 89.
