= Taldom =

Town in Moscow Oblast, Russia

Taldom Талдом
- Town
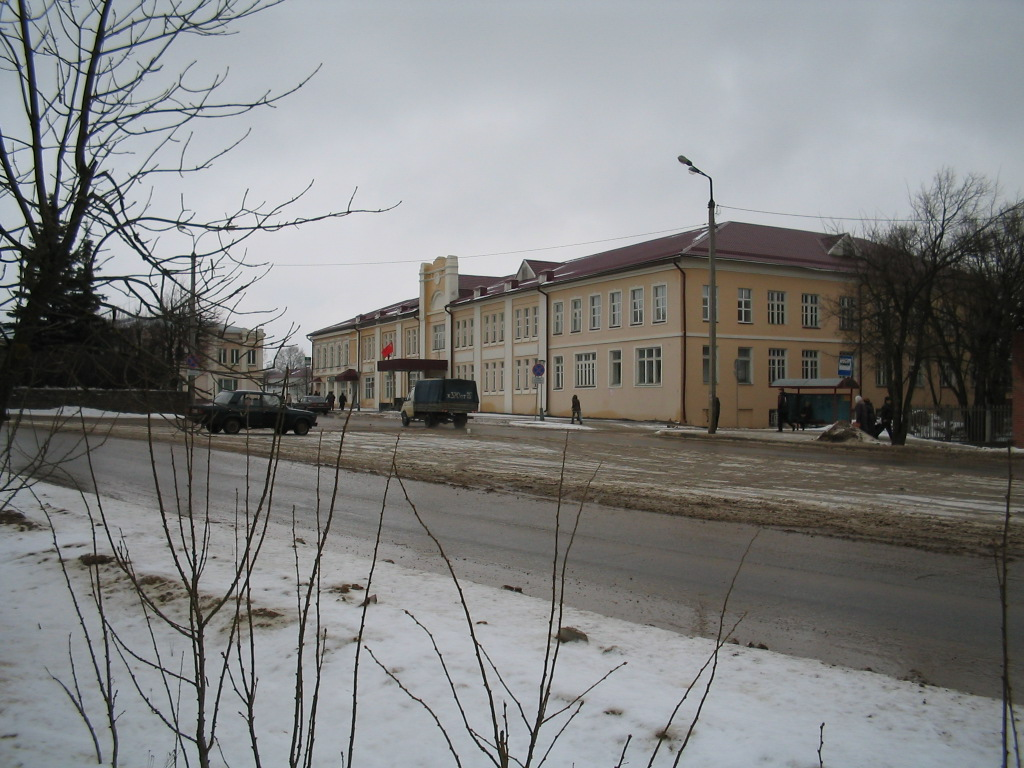
- Taldom Town Administration building

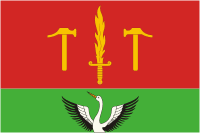
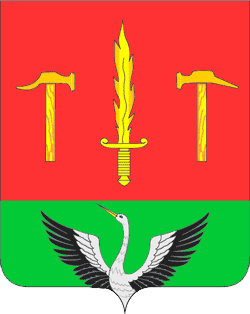
- Flag Coat of arms
- Interactive map of Taldom
- Location of Taldom Taldom (Moscow Oblast)
- Coordinates: 56°44′N 37°32′E
- Country: Russia
- Federal subject: Moscow Oblast
- Founded: 1677
- Town status since: 1918

Population (2010 Census)
  - Total: 13,819
  - Estimate (2025): 17,048 (+23.4%)

Administrative status
  - Subordinated to: Taldom Town Under Oblast Jurisdiction
  - Capital of: Taldom Town Under Oblast Jurisdiction

Municipal status
  - Urban okrug: Taldom Urban Okrug
  - Capital of: Taldom Urban Okrug
- Time zone: UTC+3 (MSK)
- Postal codes: 141900, 141901
- OKTMO ID: 46778000001
- Town Day: August 2
- Website: taldom-gorod.ru

Taldom (Russian: Та́лдом) is a town in Moscow Oblast, Russia, located 110 kilometers (68 mi) north of Moscow, on a suburban railway connecting Moscow to Savyolovo. Population: 13,819 (2010 census); 13,334 (2002 census); 14,410 (1989 Soviet census). It is located within the Moscow Standard Time Zone (GMT+3).

Between 1918 and 1929, it was known as Leninsk.

== Etymology ==
The origin of the town's name remains controversial. There are three main theories: Finno-Ugric, Tatar and Russian. According to the first one, the word has Finno-Ugric (Meryan or Karelian) roots and originates from words with the root "tal" (talo - house; talous - household). It should be understood that the Meryan language is extinct and attempts to restore it remain controversial. On the old maps of 18th and 19th centuries the village is named Taldoma (rus. Талдома). In Karelian and Veps languages -oma means land.

The Tatar version is connected with an old urban legend about a certain Tatar prince Taldu, who allegedly stayed or even ruled here during the Mongol invasion or later, when these lands were given over to the Kasimov Tatars. There is also a linguistic justification of the Tatar theory. According to it, the word Taldom comes from the Kipchak root meaning a nomad camp.

The Russian theory is folk. It is based on people's ignorance of Finno-Ugric or Turkic roots in the past. According to it, a priest was passing by the place and saw smoke from a bonfire on the site of the future town and said: "There is a smoke" (rus. Там дым, Tam dym). It was transformed into Taldom.

In the story "Shoes" (rus. Башмаки, Bashmaki), M. M. Prishvin refers to the versions of the Taldom priest of the early 20th century, M. Krestnikov. According to one of them: "Taldom is a Tatar word and means nomad camp," another: "Taldom is Finnish and means yellow soil." According to the folk version: "Taldom — it was set a new house" (rus. Талдом — стал (новый) дом, Taldom — stal (novy) dom). This theory is also based on the wordplay.

== History ==
Taldom district has been inhabited since the Prehistoric times, but Taldom was first mentioned as a village only in 1677. Formally it remained a village until 1918 but in fact it gained the population of an awerage town in the middle of the 19th century.

=== Before the foundation of the village ===
No older settlements have been found on the territory of the town. Although the surroundings of Taldom have been inhabited since the late Stone Age. No comprehensive archaeological work has been carried out on the territory of the town. Not even any treasures were found.

=== Taldom in the 17-19th centuries ===
The first mention of the toponym dates back to 1650. In the census of the wastelands of Lukian Mizintsov, boyar son from Kashin. Taldom was first mentioned as a village in 1677. This fact is widely recognized by local historians, because there is no mention of a village called Taldom in the Kashinskaya Pistsovaya Kniga (the scrible book of Kashin) of 1627–1629. However, in the scribal book of Kashin from 1677, there is a mention of one. Taldom was founded on the banks of the Taldomka creek (basin of Kuyminka, Dubna, and Volga). In 1677, there were only seven families living there. Therefore, there were seven yards with 38 inhabitants. The village belonged to Archbishop Simeon of Tver and Kashin. Because of the poor soils people here worked as skinners and tanners. So it was an artisan village.

From 1677 to 1688, Taldom was a part of the Kimry Palace Volost. Until the year of 1764 it was a property of the Archbishop of Tver and Kashin. In 1680, a wooden church was built (by local historian Leo Krylov). The church was built up to 1717. Between 1688 and 1719 Taldom was a part of Gostunskaya volost (rus. Гостунская волость) of Kashin uezd. Since the year 1702, Taldom was part of the Governatory of Ingermanland, which since 1711 became the Governatory of St. Petersburg. Since 1719, it was the part of Uglich Province. In 1727 Uglich Province became a part of the Governatory of Moscow.

Thought that the present-day District of Taldom is a part of the medieval Grand Duchy of Tver. The town itself was economically closer to Yaroslavl until the mid-20th century when it became closer to Moscow due to internal migrations.

After the Secularisation reform of Cathrene the Great in 1764, Taldom became an economical settlement (rus. экономическое поселение, economicheskoye poseleniye) belonged to the College of Economics of the Sinodal Bord. After this, Taldom became a trading village. In 1776, the Kalyazinsky uezd was formed as part of the Tver Governorate, which included the village of Taldom. Taldom volost was formed around it.

In 1778, a fire broke out in the village of Taldom. Many houses and a church burned down. In 1780, the church was rebuilt in wood, and in 1795 it was rebuilt in stone. In 1808, the stone church was consecrated. In 1829, there were 30 yards in Taldom. In 1835, there were 41 yards. In 1859, more than 1,000 people (508 men and 537 women) lived in Taldom, and there were 147 households. However, despite the rapid population growth, Taldom remained a village. This growth temporarily stopped in 1869, when the second major fire occurred in Taldom, which, according to the testimony of the clerk of the Ermolino estate of Saltykovs, V. I. Bylinin, destroyed up to 155 houses. The village burned 2 times within 4 days. According to Bylinin, "clean fields were created." However, by the 1880s the village had recovered. After the abolition of serfdom in 1861, the influx of labor and the growing demand for shoes further contributed to the development of the shoe industry in the Taldom. Taldom becomes the center of shoe trade. If at the beginning of the 19th century fairs were held in Taldom 2 times a year, by the end of the 19th century these fairs turned into regular weekly auctions, attracting numerous shoe buyers from all over Russia. The trade was held in tents near the St. Michael's Church on the Trading (rus. Торговая, Torgovaya) Square (now Karl Marx Square). In the 18th century, "bricks" (rus. кирпичи, kirpichi) were produced here - men's shoes with a clay lining. Then came the technology of manufacturing "ostashi" (rus. осташи) (boots with high tops made of rough, unpainted leather). In the 19th century, the manufacture of corduroy and velvet shoes with fur began. By the end of the 19th century, the city was making shoes of various kinds, ranging from children's and ladies' shoes to wading and army boots. On October 4, 1877, the Zemstvo (local) hospital with surgical, therapeutic and infectious diseases buildings, with an outpatient clinic and office apartments for medical staff (as of 1906) was opened. In 1887, the Church of St. Michael the Archangel was rebuilt according to the project of P. A. Vinogradov.

=== The heyday of the village between 1888 and 1918 ===
By 1888, Taldom had a volost (parish) board, a postal and telegraph office, a postal station, a medical assistant station, three blacksmith shops, and eight shoemaking workshops. Residents and guests of the village are served by two guesthouses, three inns, a tavern, three wine shops, forty colonial and small shops. There were 180 shoe-making workshops, 5 wholesale shoe warehouses, an oil mill, a steam mill, 2 sawmills, 4 brick factories, and a shoe-brick factory in Taldom and the district (since 1910).There were 2 zemstvo and 1 volost school, and since 1906 a two-set a ministerial school, an orphanage for 21 children, 12 teahouses, 4 beerhouses.

Shoemaking and furriery are flourishing. By this time, there is an urban legend that a certain French woman came to the village, who bought a pair of fashionable "Romanian" boots here. According to legend, a foreigner could only take out one pair of shoes from Russia. So this French woman threw away her shoes and bought two pairs. She put one on her feet, and took the other to France for sale. By selling a second pair of shoes there, she allegedly paid off her trip to Russia. This legend speaks about the high quality of Taldom shoes. However, those shoes were really famous abroad: in France and in Italy. The competitors of the villagers were residents of the neighboring Kimry, also known for their shoe products. In addition, Moscow craftsmen tried to oust the shoe market of Taldom and Kimry handicrafts. Muscovites came up with various tall tales about how bad the neighbors' shoes were and how good were their. However, this did not affect the sales volume of Taldom shoes. On the contrary, sales volumes only grew every year. Taldom and Kimry competed for the title of the "shoe capital" of Russia.

At this time, not only Orthodox Christians live in Taldom, but also a significant proportion of Old Believers. In particular, representatives of one of the most respected and wealthy families of the village, the Volkovs, came from the Old Believers. The Old Believers' Church was located on the site of a modern monument to the soviet partisan Zina Golitsyna. However, until 1905, the Old Believers were persecuted in Russia as heretics. It was only in 1906, after the introduction of religious tolerance in Russia, that the Old Believers were able to transform the prayer house into a church. There was also an Old Believers' cemetery, on the site of which a cultural center was built in Soviet times. During the Soviet times most of the Old Believers abandoned their religion for atheism or Orthodoxy.

In 1894, a private Pashkevich's pharmacy was opened in Taldom, and a year later a six-bed zemstvo (local) hospital was built. Wooden shopping malls have been built. I.I.Bychkov's company was founded, which sells children's, ladies' and men's shoes. In 1897, the first public library named after Grand Duchess Olga Nikolaevna was opened in Taldom. In 1901, the Savyolovskaya branch of the Moscow Railway passed through Taldom, connecting the village with Dmitrov, Degunino, Moscow and Kimry (Savyolovo). Thanks to the efforts of a group of merchants, the railway did not pass by the village, as planned at the beginning, but through it. In 1907, the export of leather shoes by railway alone from Taldom station amounted to 31,000 pounds or 350,000 pairs. In addition to shoe production, tailoring, furriery, and felting industries were developed, as well as logging for firewood and timber. In 1906, the Kashin trakt was paved. This made the logistics of the village as profitable as possible. In 1907, the first street lamp appeared on the streets of the village. In 1912, the post office acquired its own building.

Active brick construction in the Art Nouveau style began in 1907. Obviously, this fashion was borrowed from the neighboring Kimry. In turn, she came to Kimry from St. Petersburg. The village center is actively being rebuilt in brick style. One of the first surviving civilian brick building was the apartment building of merchant N. F. Kisilev (45 Saltykov-Shchedrin Street). Kisilev was engaged in roofing production, on which he made capital, which allowed him to build a magnificent mansion. There was a shoe store and a restaurant on the ground floor. On the second floor are the living rooms of the owners. After nationalization during the Soviet era, a school was opened in the house, where Kisilev's son Nikolai taught. The building now houses a library.

In 1908, the Volkov mansion was built next to the Kisilevs' house. The most notable representative of this Old Believer merchant family was Dmitry Ivanovich Volkov. The Volkov family, being Old Believers, did not like to spend time playing cards and drinking, like many other Taldom merchants. Instead, the family loved listening to music, going to the theater, and engaging in socially useful activities such as politics, education, local history, and literature. Dmitry Ivanovich acquired significant capital through hard work, which he later began to invest in the needs of the zemstvo, thereby covering the construction of infrastructure and social institutions in Taldom. Locals nicknamed Dmitry "The Red Sun" (rus. Красно солнышко, Krasno Solnyshko) which means a person who is respected by his merits before the people. Dmitry was personally acquainted with the writer Mikhail Prishvin and became the prototype of the main character of his story "Lord's road" (rus. Осударева дорога, Osudareva Doroga). Like Prishvin, Volkov was engaged in local history. Thus, Dmitry Ivanovich Volkov made a great contribution to the development of the village. After the abolition of the NEP, Volkov was exiled to Kalinin, and later lived out his last years in Moscow, working at the "Red Shoemaker" (rus. Красный башмачник, Krasny Bashmachnik) factory. Now the house of Volkovs is a local museum.

In addition to these houses, other unique Art Nouveau apartment buildings were built. Among them are the houses of merchants Mashatins. The houses of the brothers Alexey and Vladimir eventually merged into one house, which now houses the town administration. Alexey Mashatin, before the revolution, was engaged in the leather trade, lent loans to Taldom artisans and bought shoes from them. Vladimir Mashatin was engaged in the grocery trade. The third brother, Matvey, was also engaged in the grocery trade and owned the printing house, the oldest civilian brick building in Taldom that has survived to this day. It was founded in 1899. The houses of shoe merchants Yefim (built in 1908) and Alexey (1906) Kharitonov, located on Kalyazinskaya Street, are noteworthy. Sadov's shoe maker's House (1909), merchant S. S. Smirnov's apartment building with shopping malls (1912) and F. A. Vorontsov's apartment building (1912), which housed the city's first cinema, and later an art school that still exists. With the money of the Smirnov merchants, a brick fire station and a brick fire tower were built, which still exist. There was a fire brigade "The Red Rooster" (rus. Красный петух, Krasny petukh) with a 4-lane fire wagon train. Unfotinatly, some of the great buildings of this time were destroyed during the 20th century an so they are not presented anywhere else but on the old photos.

As for the wooden construction of the village, it remained dominant outside the center. However, the wooden houses were no less rich and large than the stone ones. Almost any wooden house of that time is richly decorated with wood carvings, especially the architraves. There is often an image of a snake in the carving patterns, which is typical for the Upper Volga region, especially for the Tver and Yaroslavl regions. The richest houses often have the owner's initials carved on the facade, and sometimes the year of construction or the name of the contractor. Many wooden houses in the city are two-storied. However, the most common type of wooden house in Taldom remained a one-story five-story building. Only in Taldom and Kimry (rarely in neighboring towns) houses with a mezzanine in the form of a bicorne hat have been preserved.

In 1908, the wooden shopping malls were rebuilt in stone. At that time, the square on which they are located (now Karl Marx Square) became known as Cathedral (rus. Соборная, Sobornaya) Square, since the Cathedral of Archangel Michael was located on it. Far beyond the borders of Tver Governorate, the faience iconostasis of the cathedral was known, which was only partially preserved after the destruction of the cathedral by the Bolsheviks. Actually, the Bolsheviks began to enter the city in 1904. In 1906 a member of the First state Duma came to Taldom so the leftists welcomed him by meeting with the red flag and slogans "Down with the autocracy!" "Long live the RSDLP!" (rus. Долой самодержавие! Да здравствует РСДРП!, Doloy samoderzhvie! Da zdravstvuet RSDRP!). In the same year police managed to arrest some of the members of the Socialist club. In 1910 police managed to declassify the underground RSDLP group. In 1914 some of the residents of the village gone to World War I. Such famous residents of Taldom as revolutionaries Nikolay Sobtsov and Mikhail Sedov, writers Sergey Klychkov and Ivan Romanov took part in the First World War. It seriously influenced Sergey Klychkov and was reflected in his works. Although the front line was far from Taldom, local artisans received a huge number of orders for shoes for the army, thereby enriching themselves. In 1916, the first cinema was opened in Taldom.

Short time before the February Revolution and the establishment of the republican system in Russia, a corporate movement began to develop in the village. In May, the Taldom branch of the Union of Dmitrov Cooperatives was opened. Now the heir of this enterprise is the Cooperator store. In the late 1910s, the cooperative movement became widespread in the Taldom district — by 1917, 29 cooperatives were operating. Most of these cooperative organizations were members of the Union of Dmitrov Cooperatives. In 1916, only the Taldom branch of the Union sold shoes for 2 million rubles. The Union rented eight premises for warehouses, and builds two wooden warehouses near the railway station. From May 1917 to January 1, 1918, 11 consumer societies appeared in Taldom district.

On April 5, 1917, a handicraft artel of shoemakers opened in Taldom. Each member of the artel worked at home, and brought the goods to the office and, after announcing the price, put them on commission. If the product did not sell, the artisan took it back or lowered the price. The artel has gained credibility. By the end of 1917, the artel already had 239 members. Starting without any funds, it gained a mutual fund of 1,195 emperial rubles. The Taldom branch of the Union of Dmitrov Cooperatives acted as an intermediary in trade. Only from October 1, 1917, to January 1, 1918, the Union supplied shoes to the Moscow Food Committee for 1.25 million rubles from the Taldom Artel.

During the period of the provisional government, a Socialist Club was formed in Taldom, uniting followers of the Socialist Revolutionaries, Anarchists, Social-Democrats, and Mensheviks.

On March 8–9, 1918, the volost congress of Soviets of Workers' and Peasants' Deputies was held, at which the Taldom Volost Council of Peasants' and Workers' Deputies (the former Zemstvo council) unanimously decided: "Recognize the power of the Soviets." The executive committee was established under the leadership of the Bolshevik I. G. Zyablikov.

=== The anti-Bolshevik rebellion of 1918 ===
Nikolai Moiseevich Sobtsov played a key role in the establishment of Soviet power in the village. He was born in 1881 in the village of Myakishevo, a few miles from Taldom, into a family of a coachman and a furrier. In 1905, while working as a shoemaker in St. Petersburg, he became interested in socialist ideology, joined the RSDLP and the Union of Shoemakers (rus. Союз Башмачников, Soyuz Bashmachnikov). In 1906, Sobtsov left for Taldom in order to spread socialist ideology among artisans. Sobtsov became the de facto chairman of the Taldom branch of the RSDLP, which was subject to the directives of the Moscow District Committee of the RSDLP(b). With Sobtsov's active participation, the organization held flying rallies and meetings, distributed proclamations and revolutionary literature. Between 1907 and 1910, Sobtsov, who staged a strike in Bychkov's workshop, was refused employment both in Taldom and in St. Petersburg. At first, he was helped by friends from the party, but by 1910, there was only one remained at large member of the RSDLP from Taldom, not counting Sobtsov himself. However, he was lucky and was hired by the merchant Smirnov. He wanted to use Sobtsov for his own purposes, as an influential figure among young artisans. But already in 1913, Sobtsov created his own workshop. Soon a Socialist Club is forming around it. In 1915–1918, Sobtsov participated in the First World War, where he promoted socialist ideas among soldiers. In February 1918, he was demobilized and, together with M. Sedov, a fellow party member and member of the Socialist Club, held the first volost congress of Soviets on March 5, 1918. On April 3, Sobtsov made a report on the work of the All-Russian Congress of Soviets at a regular meeting of the volost council. During this very difficult period of the formation of Soviet power in the country, and in Taldom in particular, the food supply of the population was a very acute issue. Sobtsov was elected Commissioner for Food (rus. Комиссар продовольствия, Comissar prodovol'stviya). Against the background of the dire situation both in the country and directly in the region, Sobtsov starts a company to seize bread from wealthy peasants, introduces an emergency tax. On May 1, 1918, at a rally dedicated to the International Day of Workers' Solidarity, Sobtsov made a speech, urging people to build a new bright life. The haters of Soviet power present at the rally did not hesitate to say: "Here we will show him a bright future!" (rus. Вот мы ему покажем светлое будущее!", Vot my yemu pokazhem svetloye buduscheye).

It is ironic that the events that killed Sobtsov began in his native village of Myakishevo. On March 12, 1918, the villagers held a meeting to discuss food issues. Nikolai Merkulov proposed to arrange a flag and on May 14 he would go to Taldom to ask the authorities for bread and free trade. Citizen Ivan Korzhin raised money for the flag for 40 kopecks per person. The flag was a banner with the inscription: "Government, give us bread, long live free trade!" (rus. Власть, дай хлеба, да здравствует свободный торг!, Vlast', day khleba, da zdravstvuyet svobodny torg!). The flag was created by Nikolai Merkulov, Sergey Kunitsyn and Pavel Belov. On May 14, a crowd of angry wealthy peasants headed from Myakishevo to Taldom, passing along the Kashinsky trakt through the villages of Sotskoye, Karachunovo, Akhtimneevo, Kostino and Vysochki, where the crowd noticeably increased due to local residents joining the march. At that time, a meeting was held in Taldom with the participation of members of the audit commission (rus. Ревизионная комиссия, Revizionnaya commissia). Ivan Guryanovich Zyablikov met the crowd at the Executive Committee building (rus. Исполком (Исполнительный комитет), Ispolkom (Ispolnitel'ny comitet). He offered to choose deputies for negotiations, to which the crowd did not agree and demanded the extradition of Sobtsov. In addition, the crowd demanded the release of those arrested for non-payment of the emergency tax. Zyablikov, along with the rebels, went to the detention facility, where it turned out that almost all of those arrested, except one, had already been released by the rebels. The police were disarmed, and Zyablikov was arrested. The crowd took him to the telegraph office to forbid him from receiving and sending any telegrams about the events taking place. Following that, Sedov, the security commissioner, and Korolev, a member of the volost executive committee, were arrested and beaten. I. M. Malkov played a key role in the arrests of the committee participants. Kachalov, a member of the executive committee, tried to send a telegram about the events to Savelovo through the telegraph, but Vladimir Fedotov, the telegraph operator, refused to send the message. Andrei Zyablikov came to the telegraph station and arrested Kachalov. He took him to the crowd, who beat him with extreme brutality. After the arrest of the committee participants, the crowd split up. Some of the rebels went to conduct searches in the homes of Soviet employees, while the other, the main one, went to look for Sobtsov. The fact that Sobtsov is at home was indicated by his neighbor by the name of Guzikova. She supervised the search from the window. As a result, Sobtsov was found in the basement, taken outside and killed by several shots from a revolver by a peasant from the village of Sotskoye, Ivan Spiridonovich Kozhevnikov. Searches also took place in the houses of the secretary of security (rus. Секретарь охраны, Sekretar' okhrany) Khlebnikov, the Commissioner of Labor (rus. Комиссар труда, Comissar truda) Kostyorin, policemen Fuchsin and Podkidyshev, in the warehouse of the union of Dmitrov cooperative and in the apartment of Yevdokia Ivanova.

At 6 p.m., the gathering began under the command of Nikolay Stepanovich Smirnov, the ideological mastermind of the uprising. Smirnov proposes to establish a new government body instead of the old one, which was beaten and arrested. He suggests that the village committee (rus. Сельский комитет, Sel'skiy comitet) take over the functions of the executive committee, to which the village committee agrees. Citizen Gromov was elected Chairman of the village assembly. The gathering lasted until 10 p.m., after which the crowd dispersed, leaving the guards. At this time, Kosterin, who was fleeing from persecution, reached the Lebzino station. Later, Volkonsky joined him. Together they went to Savyolovo, as the phone in Lebzino was not working. From there, they called Taldom to find out what the situation in the village was like and received an answer that everything was calm and nothing had happened. In the morning, Kosterin and Volkonsky returned to Taldom with a punitive detachment. The squad fired at the council building, after which the guards fled. After that, the leaders of the uprising were arrested. The uprising was suppressed, and Soviet power was restored in the village. Later, the Moskovskaya Street where Sobtsov's murder took place was renamed in his honor. Now there is a monument to the revolutionary on it.

=== 20th century ===
After the October Revolution, using the 2 million rubles received from the "extraordinary one-time tax on property" in March 1918 "for the needs of the Executive Committee," the first passenger car was purchased in Taldom (it was scrapped in the summer of 1918). Using the same funds, in March 1918, the construction of a town power plant began (it began operating in 1923). At the end of April, printing equipment was purchased, and a printing house, a bookbinding workshop, and a bookstore were organized in the "3-story stone building of Klychkov's workshop, rented for 600 rubles per month." On May 1, 1918, the first issue of the newspaper "Peasant and Worker" (rus. Крестьянин и рабочий, Krest'yanin i rabochiy) was published in this printing house. In June 1918, the village council (rus. поселковый совет, poselkovy sovet) was formed, and in July the council of economic development or sovnarkhoz was established (chairman - M. P. Sedov). In the same year, a club was opened in the house of merchant Chernov. The first electric light bulb in the town lit up (the current was given from the cinema engine). A shoe-block factory was opened in December.

On November 5, 1918, the deputy soviet of Taldom decided to give a town status for the village and rename it to Leninsk. By the decision of the Presidium of the Tver Provincial Executive Committee of December 3, 1918, the village of Taldom was renamed the town of Leninsk — the first settlement to be renamed after Vladimir Lenin (who was still alive then) — and the Taldomskaya volost was renamed to Leninskaya. In response to the "petitions of the population" of the volosts of the Tver, Moscow, and Vladimir provinces adjacent to Leninsk and economically connected with the production of footwear, on August 15, 1921, by decree of the All-Russian Central Executive Committee, a new Leninsk District was formed as part of the Moscow Governorate with its center in the town of Leninsk.

In 1919 due to the Civil war in Russia, Taldomskaya volost was declar under martial low.

During the years of the civil war and war communism, the shoe trade of the residents of Taldom declined sharply. Only during the New Economic Policy did handicraft shoe production begin to revive, but it did not reach its former scale. As the NEP was winding down, the shoe industry declined again, and by the mid-1930s, it disappeared completely due to dekulakization. In 1923, the town was electrified.

In January 1920, the district committee of the Bolshevik Party was formed (chairman - A. K. Kosterin). On May 1, the Museum of nature and life of the local region was opened. In August, the district committee of the Communist Youth Union (rus. Коммунистический союз молодёжи, Communisticheskiy soyuz molodyozhi) was established. In the same year, the town's power plant was built, which operated until 1945. A veterinary clinic was opened. The activities of the Union of Dmitrov Cooperatives, as an organization in opposition to the Bolsheviks, have been terminated. On April 15, 1921, the first district congress of the Komsomol was held. On August 15 of the same year, Leninskaya Volost was transformed into Leninsky Uyezd, which covered the territories of the modern Taldomsky district and part of the current Dmitrovsky district. An elementary school building was built in 1922. In 1923, the district library and the "Lenstroy" housing and cooperative partnership were organized, which built six houses. In December, the third Uyezd Congress of Soviets was held. In 1924, the first 1,200 meters of water supply were laid. In 1925, a large shoe fair was held in Leninsk. In the same year, as part of the fight against religion in the USSR, the Church of Archangel Michael, the only Orthodox church in the town, was closed. In the same year, the Leninsk Consumer Society opened a bakery. In 1926, the artel of tailors "Avangard" (now "Yunost-2") was opened, and in 1927 the artel of shoemakers (now "Taldomobuv'") was opened. Thus, the material basis was laid for the transition of the population (both tailors and shoemakers) from home-based production to centralized factory production.

From October 1922 to March 1925, the famous Russian writer Mikhail Mikhailovich Prishvin lived in Leninsk, more precisely, in the adjacent village of Kostino. Here he wrote a number of his works: "Shoes" (rus. Башмаки, Bashmaki), "Crane Homeland" (rus. Журавлиная родина, Zhuravlinaya rodina), "Lord's road" (rus. Осударева дорога, Osudareva doroga), "Anchar" (rus. Анчар), "Yarik" (rus. Ярик), "Red felling" (rus. Красная вырубка, Krasnaya vyrubka), "Mammoth Hunt" (rus. Охота на мамонта, Okhota na mamonta), "Death Run" (rus. Смертный пробег, Smertny probeg), "Cheese" (rus. Сыр, Syr) and others. Prishvin came to Taldom at the invitation of Sergey Antonovich Klychkov, a close friend of Sergey Yesenin. He initially settled Prishvin at his home in the village of Dubrovki. It was only in 1924 that Prishvin moved to Kostino. The purpose of the visit to Leninsk was to study artisanal shoe crafts in the northern uezds of the Moscow governorate. Prishvin recorded the peculiarities of handicraft production from the words of artisans familiar to him, compiled a map of crafts indicating the main centers of crafts. Prishvin studied customs and recorded folklore. I talked a lot with the locals, traveled, and took pictures. He advocated for the protection of the nature of the region, especially for the protection of the unique relict algae cladophora, which lived in Lake Zabolotskoye, on the border with Sergiev Posad district. It was his pen that gave the name of the largest protected area of the modern Taldom district — the Crane Homeland (rus. Журавлиная родина, Zhuravlinaya rodina). It is known that the writer traveled along the Dubna river and lake Zabolotskoye on a dugout boat in order to search for the algae of the cladophora, which has existed here since the last glaciation. Unfortunately, the relict population could not be saved, and it most likely extinct out in the 1960s due to the drainage of swamps. The writer summed up his visit to Taldom with the essay "The History of the Taldom village Civilization" (1925), in which he described ethnographic and local history observations, interviews with local residents, legends, and reportage episodes. In May 1924, Prishvin initiated the creation of a local history society, which began to publish the magazine "Shoe Country" (rus. Башмачная страна, Bashmachnaya strana). Local history research was supported by local authorities, including M. P. Sedov, who, together with Prishvin himself, took part in the conference with a report on the work done by local historians on September 15, 1924. In 1973, Vysochkovskaya Street was renamed in honor of Prishvin on the occasion of the writer's 100th birthday.

During the pre-revolutionary heyday of the village and the NEP, a large number of Taldom residents managed to accumulate considerable capital by engaging in handicrafts. By the time the NEP was abolished in 1928, Taldom was home to a large number of wealthy peasants, whom the Soviet government classified as kulaks and enemies of the working people. With the abolition of the NEP and the beginning of collectivization, the process of active dekulakization began. If in the early years of Soviet power only the wealthiest representatives of the merchant class were repressed, then in the 1930s both kulaks and serednyaks (peasants who occupied an intermediate position between kulaks and the poor), which also included many artisanal homeworkers, began to be repressed. In total, between 100 and several hundred residents were dispossessed, repressed, executed, or deported from the region during the period of Stalinist repression.

In 1929–1930, during the period of district administrative division, Leninsk belonged to Kimry District of Moscow Obast.

In 1929, the town radio center was put into operation. In the same year became the idea to give the town its historical or another name so, Leninsk was renamed back to Taldom. But before it there was a short period when the town called Sobtsovsk. In November 1930, after another reorganization of the administrative division, two districts with the name Leninsky appeared in Moscow Oblast, and Leninsk (Taldom) was renamed Sobtsovsk, in honor of Nikolai Sobtsov, who was killed in May 1918 during an anti-Bolshevik hunger riot in Taldom. However, the name Sobtsovsk lasted less than six months — the central authorities did not approve it due to the dubiousness of Sobtsov's Bolshevism. In March 1931, the town returned to its historical name, Taldom; the district, accordingly, began to be called Taldomsky. The Moscow Governorate was transformed into the Moscow Oblast, and all uezds, including Leninsk, into districts. This is how the Taldom district of the Moscow Oblast was formed.

From 1930 to the 1960s, the newspaper "Collective Labor" (rus. Коллективный труд, Collectivny trud) existed. A dairy factory has opened in the town. In 1931, the pedagogical college was opened. In 1932, a collective farm market was built and a children's library was opened. In 1933, the radio issue of the newspaper "Collective Labor" began to be published. On the basis of the locksmith and mechanical workshop of the Kimry artel "Metallist" (it has been functioning since 1930), the Taldom artel "Ploogobyedinenie" (rus. Плугобъединение) was established with six branches - two in the town, the rest in the district. In 1934, a gliding school was organized in Taldom (4 gliders were purchased). A town park has been opened, a summer stage has been built, and a public garden has been laid out in the town center. The first MTS machine tractor station in the area was organized, and a monument to Lenin was unveiled. In 1935, a parachute tower was built and commissioned in the town, and a new veterinary hospital building was built. By 1937, Taldom was fully electrified. In 1939, a poultry slaughter and processing plant was organized in the town. In 1940, a vocational school for 320 people was organized in Taldom. Thus, by the beginning of the Great Patriotic War of 1941–1945, Taldom was a developed industrial town with a large number of different infrastructure.

In June 1941, after the outbreak of the Great Patriotic War, a comprehensive combat training and a fighter battalion were organized in the town, which became a frontline zone. A call for volunteers to fight the enemy has been organized. A total of 14,000 residents of the district went to war. 6,000 of them did not return from the battlefields. 2,110 people died in battle, 763 died of wounds and diseases in captivity, and 3,389 were missing. The Moscow Canal and Ramenskoye Forest, which was then part of the Taldomsky district, separated Taldom from the front line. The Wehrmacht forces marched along the edge of this forest, occupying the western part of the Dmitrov district, but without taking control of a single settlement in the Taldomsky district. This was prevented by the Red Army's counteroffensive near Moscow in 1941, during which the territories of the nearby Dmitrov district were liberated.

In 1943, the district food processing plant was organized with workshops (departments): confectionery, soft drinks, starch and treacle, and fruit and vegetable farming. In 1945, Taldom and Taldom district were connected to the state power grid. In 1946, a new secondary school was built in the town (1, Orlova Street), and a new public bathhouse was opened. In 1949, a group of the All-Union Society of the Blind was organized.

In the 1950s, active asphalting of roads connecting Taldom with regional settlements began. In 1955, an ambulance service was organized, and the "Spartak" ("Harvest") stadium was built. In 1956, the Sobtsov artel was renamed the Taldom Shoe Factory. By this time, almost all artisans began working at the "Yunost" factories and at the shoe factory. On average, representatives of the generation born before the 1950s, almost without exception, owned one or another craft. The post-war generation stopped learning crafts, as new windows of opportunity began to open, including the opportunity to go to study or work in Moscow. In 1957, an artel of household sanitation was established in Taldom. In 1959, a cultural center was built on the site of the demolished Old Believers cemetery. In 1960, a new water pumping station began to supply water to the town's water supply network, construction of a boarding school for 920 people began (Taldom Secondary school No. 3 is now located here), and the children's music school (piano, accordion, and violin classes) accepted its first students.

The 1960s were the last decade before the start of mass migration, typical of all small towns in the European part of Russia at that time. In the 1960s, the massive construction of the town began with typical apartment buildings - "Khrushchevki", and later — "Brezhnevki". They replaced the previously existing barracks and bunkhouses, which were housed in large private houses. The construction of three new residential districts of the town, consisting entirely of panel houses, begins: Jubilee (rus. Юбилейный, Yubileyny), Sovkhoz (rus. Совхоз), PMK-21 (rus. ПМК-21). On average, most houses did not exceed a height of five floors. In 1962, the Taldom Consumer Services Plant was established, which had a sewing workshop, dry cleaning, a watch and furniture workshop, a photo studio, a shoe repair shop, and the Taldom Metal Products Factory was organized on the basis of a former hardware factory.

In 1962, Taldom district was abolished and merged to Dmitrov district, but in 1965, it was reestablished due to the fall of administrative reform.

In 1965, the first issue of the regional newspaper "The Dawn" (rus. Заря, Zarya) was published, the most popular in the town, until the closure of the printing house in 2018. In 1967, the construction of the "Jubilee" microdistrict began. In the same year, on the site of the Old Believers church, a monument to the partisan Zina Golitsyna, who operated during the Great Patriotic War, was unveiled. In 1969, the metal products plant was renamed the technological equipment plant. In 1970, a monument to those who died during the Great Patriotic War was erected in the "Jubilee" microdistrict, and Victory Park (rus. Парк Победы, Park Pobedy) was laid out. In the same year, a bus station building was opened. On the central estate of the Taldom collective farm the "Wheat" (rus. Колос, Kolos) cultural center was opened. On July 3, 1971, Taldom established its own traffic police department. In 1972, the gasification of the town began. The shoe-brick factory became part of the technological equipment plant.

A communications center and a PBX for 2,000 subscribers have been built in the town center. In 1973, the bakery factory was put into operation. In 1974, an agrochemical center was established in Taldom. In 1975, the Taldom Shoe Factory and Taldom Shoe Factory No. 1 merged into the Taldom Shoe Factory as part of the Moscow shoe manufacturing association "The East" (rus. Восток, Vostok). In 1977, Taldom celebrated its 300th anniversary. In honor of this event, the first electric train came to the town. The House of everyday life was built in the same year. TRUEMS was founded in 1984. (Taldom District Repair and Maintenance Association of Land Reclamation and Water Management) on the basis of the Dubna Interdistrict Department for the Operation of Land Reclamation Systems and Water Facilities and the Dubna PMK. A new secondary school No. 2 ("white") has been opened.

With the beginning of Perestroika in 1985, the town's economy began to decline. People began to leave en masse for neighboring towns and cities: Dubna, Dmitrov and Moscow, where there were more opportunities for self-realization. At the same time, in the 1990s, against the backdrop of the food crisis in Moscow, some people, on the contrary, went to small towns such as Taldom to run their own subsidiary farms. Cottage settlements of summer residents have grown up around the town, including numerous GNCP (gardening non-commercial partnerships). Since the beginning of privatization, most of the enterprises have either closed or fallen into disrepair. The local population began to trade in the market and quit their previous jobs en masse. At the same time, there is an active spiritual revival of the town. In 1990, the Church of St. Michael the Archangel was reopened. In 1991, the Taldom town Soviet ceased its activities. On February 1, 1993, the Taldom Museum received the status of a historical and literature museum. In the same year, on September 1, a youth center and a temporary shelter for minors opened in Taldom. After the events of October 1993 in Moscow, the district Soviet of People's Deputies and village soviets were dissolved. Their legal successors were the administration of the Taldom district and the administrations of the territories of rural councils. In 1994, by decree of the ruling bishop, His Eminence Juvenal, Metropolitan of Krutitsy and Kolomna, the Taldom church district was established. An orphanage has been opened in Taldom (closed in 2009). In 1995, the new train station building was inaugurated. In 1996, the Taldom Children's Art School was reorganized into the lyceum "School of Arts". Life in the town is beginning to be preserved. A large number of young people have moved to other places, so the population of Taldom has noticeably become older. This was also typical for other small towns in Russia at that time. During the 20th century, the city turned from a county craft village with poor infrastructure into a developed industrial city, but the difficulties of the 1990s disrupted this picture. During the late USSR — 1990s, up to 200 residents became internationalist soldiers who fought in Afghanistan and Chechnya.

=== A modern town ===
Until 2013, the town remained in a rather sad situation regarding the degree of improvement and restoration of historical buildings. Although new jobs began to appear in the town, the population decline continued. In 2001, the bus station building was renovated. A monument to the writer Sergey Klychkov was unveiled in the courtyard of the library (the house of the merchant Kiselyov). In 2004, on September 1, a municipal institution of secondary vocational education, the college of Decorative and Applied Arts and folk crafts, was opened on the basis of the lyceum, and a ring road was built in the "Jubilee" microdistrict. In 2007, the "Atlant" (rus. Атлант) Sports Palace was opened. In the first half of the 2010s, the gradual improvement and restoration of historical buildings in the town began. The sculpture "Storks" (rus. Аисты, Aisty) was built in front of the virtually closed "Motherland" (rus. Родина, Rodina) cinema. In 2013, the ruins of the fire tower were dismantled, after which the building was recreated in its historical form. A registry office and an observation deck were opened in it. In 2017, a brick tower was renovated near the lyceum building. The main town clock was mounted on it. Also, one of the three carillions in Russia was installed on this tower. Saltykov-Shchedrin Square was landscaped next to the tower and a monument to the writer was erected. By the mid-2020s, the bell tower of the Church of St. Michael the Archangel was restored and rebuilt, the town park and walking areas in the "Jubilee" district were landscaped. In 2019, the "Motherland" cinema reopened.

However, there were corruption scandals. Probably one of the most striking examples of misuse of budget funds is the bike path, which is only a few meters long. There was a widespread reaction to the administrative reform of 2013 - 2018 in Taldom and Taldom district. The purpose of this reform was to create urban districts, that is, to strip the powers of local governments (urban and rural settlements) by combining them into a single territorial unit headed by a protege from the region, acting in the interests of the central government of Putin's Russia to the detriment of the local population. The leader of the opposition to this reform was the then head of the Taldom town council, Yury Vitalievich Zhurkin (CPRF), and the leader of the few supporters was Vladislav Yurievich Yudin (United Russia). Despite the popular and widespread condemnation of the reform (especially in Taldom and Zaprudnya), the reform was carried out in favor of the central government. Urban and rural settlements were abolished and merged into the Taldom urban district headed by Yudin. However, in 2020, Yudin was "promoted" and transferred to the post of head of the town of Dolgoprudny, closer to Moscow and Krasnogorsk. This covered up Yudin's numerous accusations of corruption. However, in 2024, he was finally arrested on September 12. Since his departure, the district has been headed by Yuri Vasilyevich Krupenin, with whom accusations of corruption by local authorities from residents have only increased. In particular, in 2024 — 2025, a criminal case was opened under the article abuse of office (corruption) against the former deputy head of the district, Victoria Zaitseva, who signed fictitious contracts for the repair of wells in the district for 2.4 million rubles, for which she was sentenced to 3 years in a penal colony. In 2024, the improvement of the town center began. It ended in 2025.

Against the background of the economic crisis in Russia, in 2024, the shoe company Ralf Ringer, which owned the "Taldomobuv'" factory, went bankrupt. After that, the factory was closed, which ended the glorious history of the Taldom shoe industry.

==== Heads of the town ====
The head of the town was also the head of the urban settlement of Taldom until the Administrtive reform of 2018.

- 2005–2013, Grigory Stepanovich Miroshnichenko (United Russia).
- 08/09/2013 — 30/07/2018, Yury Vitalyevich Zhurkin (Communist Party of the Russian Federation).
- 30/07/2018 — 31/07/2018, Vladislav Yuryevich Yudin (United Russia) (as the Head of Taldom urban district)
- 31/07/2018 — present, Yury Vasilyevich Krupenin (United Russia) (as the Head of urban district).

== Demography ==
Historical population
| Year | Pop. | ±% |
|---|---|---|
| 1859 | 1,134 | — |
| 1888 | 958 | −15.5% |
| 1897 | 1,200 | +25.3% |
| 1920 | 2,601 | +116.8% |
| 1926 | 5,982 | +130.0% |
| 1931 | 8,000 | +33.7% |
| 1939 | 9,910 | +23.9% |
| 1959 | 10,368 | +4.6% |
| 1970 | 11,876 | +14.5% |
| 1979 | 13,086 | +10.2% |
| 1989 | 14,410 | +10.1% |
| 1992 | 14,600 | +1.3% |
| 1996 | 14,300 | −2.1% |
| 1998 | 14,300 | +0.0% |
| 2001 | 14,000 | −2.1% |
| 2002 | 13,334 | −4.8% |
| 2003 | 13,300 | −0.3% |
| 2005 | 13,100 | −1.5% |
| 2006 | 13,500 | +3.1% |
| 2007 | 12,800 | −5.2% |
| 2009 | 12,482 | −2.5% |
| 2010 | 13,819 | +10.7% |
| 2011 | 13,800 | −0.1% |
| 2012 | 13,607 | −1.4% |
| 2013 | 13,521 | −0.6% |
| 2014 | 13,325 | −1.4% |
| 2015 | 13,258 | −0.5% |
| 2016 | 13,099 | −1.2% |
| 2017 | 12,958 | −1.1% |
| 2018 | 12,777 | −1.4% |
| 2019 | 12,652 | −1.0% |
| 2020 | 12,596 | −0.4% |
| 2021 | 17,317 | +37.5% |
| 2023 | 17,099 | −1.3% |
| 2024 | 16,940 | −0.9% |

The population of the town as of 2024 was 16,940 people. Despite the constant outflow, which has been recorded since 2011 by an average of 0.5-1.5% per year due to the lack of jobs and low prospects in those places that exist, the population increased sharply in 2020, most likely due to the fact that some of the Taldom residents who lived in Moscow and other cities, they moved back during the coronavirus epidemic because pandemic situation here was better than in Moscow. After the end of the epidemic and the outbreak of war in Ukraine, the population is again regularly decreasing by 1-1.5% per year. The trend is likely to continue, as the town's largest employer enterprises (Taldomobuv', Yunost', and others) closed in the first half of the 2020s. Young people are trying to move to Moscow and Dubna. At the same time, the town suffers from illegal migration from Central Asian countries, which is typical for the entire Moscow region.

The age structure of the town is characterized by a predominance of the working-age population: 43.01% of residents are between the ages of 31 and 60. The share of elderly people (60 years and older) is 23.2%, and children and adolescents under 18 years of age is 21.8%. The national composition of the Taldom is predominantly homogeneous: 79.8% of the population are Russians. Other ethnic groups include Tatars (3.83%), Ukrainians (2.03%) and Bashkirs (1.15%). The gender ratio shows the numerical predominance of women (55.92%) over men (44.08%).

Among the peoples who lived in Taldom before the collapse of the USSR and the beginning of migrations from the Caucasus region and Central Asia, one can distinguish: Chuvash (143 people), Mordvins (73 people). A large diaspora of Mordvins (Moksha and Erzya) was formed in the post-war years. Udmurts (55 people), Mari (53 people) and Belarusians (71 people). In pre-revolutionary Russia, a group of Tver Karelians also lived in the town and district, which probably completely assimilated during the 20th century.

The only spoken language in the town is Russian. The Taldom Karelians had their own specific patois of Tver Karelian dialect, but it has not been studied.

From the point of view of religion, the population of the town is mainly represented by Christians. Both Orthodox and Old Believer communities have long existed in the town. Orthodoxy prevailed over the Old Believers, although the latter had a strong position, especially in the matter of economics (many rich merchants were Old Believers of the priestly type). Now the Old Believers have disappeared. There is no registered Old Believer community. Orthodoxy is represented primarily by the Russian Orthodox Church. The center of the Orthodox community of the town is the Church of Archangel Michael. Regular worship services are conducted.

According to the statements of the Orthodox clergy, there are pagans in the town.

Besides Orthodoxy, Christianity is also represented by Baptism. There is an Evangelical Christian Baptist church in the town. Baptism appeared in Taldom in the 1950s. The leader of the local believers was Pastor Nikolai Sokolov, who served time in the Gulag for plundering state property. After the 1953 amnesty, he was released and organized a secret (in Soviet times, any Christian churches were persecuted) Baptist sect. Above it was the Baptist church in Kimry. Sokolov and his parishioners scattered letters to the sites urging them to prepare for the "last judgment" and send this letter to seven more acquaintances. In 1960, Sokolov was arrested and sentenced to two years in exile for his "parasitic lifestyle." Allegedly, with donations from parishioners, Sokolov built himself a house, bought a motorcycle and practically did not work. After that, the spiritual life of the Baptists in the town was revived only in 2002. The presbyter at that time was Adelina Philippovna Stumpf.

Some people remain unbelievers and atheists.

== Culture ==
=== Museums and galleries ===
There are two museums and one art gallery in the town. The Historical and Literary Museum is located in Dmitry Ivanovich Volkov's mansion on Saltykov-Shchedrin Street. In fact, the museum also performs the functions of a historical archive. It contains historical documents related to the town and the district, including census books. The museum has several halls: "Cathedral Square" (furniture, church utensils, antique photographs, things used in everyday life by citizens are performed there), "Merchant's Living Room" (portrait of poet Sergey Klychkov and his personal belongings, photographs and personal belongings of writer Peter Slyotov (Kudryavtsev)), "Literary Hall" (furniture, belongings and autographs of Saltykov-Shchedrin, J. P. Polonsky, S. A. Klychkov, M. M. Prishvin and V. N. Azhaev) and "Porcelain" (porcelain plaques with images of the evangelical apostles, made by the artist Pavel Zvayev in 1880, porcelain products from the Gardner and Kuznetsov factories (Verbilki Porcelain Factory). There are exhibitions of Taldom shoes, and the hut of a master shoemaker has been recreated. There is an exhibition telling about the history of the Old Believers (books, icons, crosses and folds, utensils, vestments and costumes). There is a stuffed bear, the remains of a faience iconostasis that was in the church of St. Michael the Archangel until it was destroyed by the Bolsheviks.

The second museum, "of Military Glory", is dedicated to the participation of Taldom residents in various wars and is located on Victory (rus. Победы, Pobedy) Street. First of all, the museum focuses on the World War II. There are exhibitions dedicated to the wars in Afghanistan, Chechnya and Ukraine. There are 3 halls and 4,000 exhibits in total.

There is also an art gallery "Light around" (rus. Свет вокруг, Svet vokrug) in Taldom. This is an urban project that includes a private gallery and a cultural and leisure center. The permanent exhibition is based on the collection of paintings by Russian artists, which has been collected by Nikolay and Natalia Galushin for many years. The gallery has a grand piano for music evenings, a lecture hall for lectures, presentations and creative evenings, as well as a studio for master classes and various types of creative activities. The lobby of the building features paintings, art objects, and albums from an extensive art history collection and books.

=== Cultural center ===
There is a cultural center in Taldom. It traces its history back to the first social club founded in 1918, so it celebrated its 105th anniversary in 2023. In 1959, the cultural center moved to its modern building near the town's center. Until recently, the "Wheat" (rus. Колос, Kolos) cultural center operated in the Sovkhoz district.

=== Town day ===
Taldom town day is celebrated on August 2. This is due to the celebration of the Orthodox day of Elijah the Prophet, who is considered the patron saint of the town. The celebrations are accompanied by the closure of traffic in the center of the town and the organization of mass celebrations in the center and in the town park, accompanied by concerts and performances by creative teams. An aircraft festival is held at the town airfield in the village of Yurkino, where anyone can fly in aircraft over the town.

== Economy ==
Historically, the two largest employers of the town were two enterprises: shoe (Taldomobuv' factory) and furry (Yunost' factory). After the collapse of the Soviet Union, the Taldomobuv' plant passed into the hands of "Stivali" LLC, which leased the plant to "Ralf Ringer" in 2019. However, in 2022, "Ralpf Ringer's" debt to "Stivali" amounted to more than 20 million rubles, and in 2024, the Taldom branch of "Ralph Ringer" went bankrupt. Yunost factory was declared bankrupt in 2020. So Taldom lost two main employers who supported traditional local crafts. The food industry, which was developed during the Soviet era, has now practically disappeared. The bakery and dairy are no longer in operation and are abandoned. The state farms adjacent to the town (including a significant pig breeding complex in Soviet times) were closed and demolished. Formally, there are two companies engaged in the canning of fish and seafood. There are industries for corrugated metal, lubricants, spices, sheet steel products, plastics, detergents, and a construction company.

== Administrative and municipal status ==
Within the framework of administrative divisions, it is, together with three urban-type settlements (Severny, Verbilki, and Zaprudnya) and a number of rural localities, incorporated as the town of oblast significance of Taldom. As a municipal division, the town of Taldom, together with the same localities, is incorporated as Taldom Urban Okrug.

=== Administrative and municipal history ===
Until 2018, Taldom was the center of Taldomsky District. As part of the reform of the administrative and municipal division of Moscow Oblast, Taldomsky District was abolished, and its territory, including the urban-type settlements of Severny, Verbilki, and Zaprudnya, and a number of rural localities, was subordinated to the town of Taldom, which at the same time was elevated to the town of oblast significance. As a municipal division, Taldomsky Municipal District was abolished, and the same territory was incorporated as Taldom Urban Okrug. The formal denomination of the area is since 2018 the town of oblast significance of Taldom with added territory.

== Sports ==
Since 2007, the "Atlant" (rus. Атлант) sports complex has been operating in Taldom, which includes both outdoor sports grounds (football stadium, volleyball courts, tennis courts, skating rink, exercise machines, etc.) and indoor sports halls. The sports complex has a swimming pool. There are exercise machines in the town park.

== Taldom transmitter ==
Taldom transmitter (Russian: переда́тчик Та́лдом) is a large facility for longwave and shortwave broadcasting near Taldom. It transmits on two longwave frequencies, on 153 kHz with 300 kW and on 261 kHz with a power of 2500 kW. The latter is, according to the World Radio TV Handbook's listings, the most powerful broadcasting station in the world. There are two longwave transmissions aerial systems: a single 257-metre-tall (843 ft) mast radiator for 153 kHz, and a ring antenna system consisting of five masts arranged in a circle around a 275 metre high guyed mast for 261 kHz (at 56°44′00.0″N 37°39′48.4″E). The latter antenna delivers good skywave suppression. The shortwave antenna system consists of several masts arranged in a row which are interconnected by cables at various heights.
