= Sergey Klychkov =

Russian writer and poet

Sergey Antonovich Klychkov
- Сергей Антонович Клычков
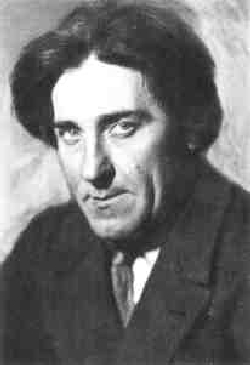
- Born: Sergey Antonovich Klychkov; 13 July 1889; Tver Governorate, Russian Empire
- Died: 8 October 1937 (aged 48); Moscow, Soviet Union
- Occupations: poet, novelist, translator
- Years active: 1907–1937
- Website: www.klychkov-sa.ru

Sergey Antonovich Klychkov (Russian: Сергей Антонович Клычков; (Note: There is a controversy as to this. According to several sources, including the extensive biography at ruvera.ru (Russian religious site), his real name was Klychkov, as corroborated by the church metrics, while his family's nickname in the village was Leshenkov (Лешенков, Wood Demon's people), which he occasionally used as a pen name. The Russian Writers dictionary states that Leshenkov was his real name. The Krugosvet Encyclopedia cites both version, giving no preference to one or another.) 13 July 1889 – 8 October 1937) was a Russian poet, novelist and translator.

== Biography ==
Klychkov was born in the village of Dubrovka, Tver Governorate. His father, a local tanner and shoemaker, was an Old Believer, and as such exerted strong influence upon his son and his future writings.

Klychkov took part in the 1905 Revolution, was on barricades as a member of the Sergey Konenkov-led fighting druzhina and described his experience in several poems, some of which, published in 1907, received praise from Sergey Gorodetsky and Vikenty Veresayev.

His debut poetry collection Pesni (Песни, Songs) came out in 1911; instrumental in the publication was his friend, mentor and occasionally sponsor Modest Chaykovski, with whom three years earlier he made a trip to Italy where he met, among others, Maxim Gorky and Anatoly Lunacharsky. It was followed by Potayonny Sad (Потаённый сад, Secret Garden), another book of fine folklore-based verse, creating a bizarred world of rural fantasy, totally detached from the real world. Klychkov served in Finland during the World War I, the experience which awoken him to the horrors of the real world and changed his mindset, having caused what he later described as a "crisis of the soul which from the very first day of this war has cringed and waned."

Part of the New peasant poets movement in Russian poetry and close to Nikolai Klyuyev, Sergey Yesenin and Alexey Ganin, Klychkov greeted the October Revolution. In 1918 co-authored (with Yesenin and Gerasimov the libretto for the cantata "For Those Who Perished for the Pece and Brotherhood of the Peoples". In September of that year he co-founded (along with Yesenin, Andrey Bely and the journalist Lev Plevitsly), the publishing house Labor Company of the Artists of the Word which published several of his books including Dubravna (Дубравна, 1918). Some more poetry collections followed, among them Domasniye Pesni (Домашние песни, 1923) and Gost Chudesny (Гость чудесный, 1923), their major themes being the destruction of Russian traditional culture, the demise of peasantry and the loneliness of a lost wonderer.

Klychkov authored three novels, Sakharny Nemets, (Сахарный немец, 1925; re-issued in 1932 as the Last Lel), Chertukinski Balakir (Чертухинский балакирь, 1926) and Knyaz Mira (Князь мира, 1932). All of them, "not rich with action, were composed of miscellaneous scenes of the associative nature, where snapshots of reality mix with images from dreams and the world of spirits, featuring a rather talkative peasant as a narrator," according to the Slavist Wolfgang Kasack. As a translator, Klychkov concentrated on Georgian poetry, and is best remembered for his translation of The Knight in the Panther's Skin by Shota Rustaveli.

In 1937 Klychkov was arrested by NKVD and accused of being a Lev Kamenev's associate and a member of the anti-Soviet terrorist (and apparently fictional) organization called the Labour Peasant Party. He was executed on 8 October. In the 1990s the documents appeared which seemed to prove that on that day he was just shot dead by an NKVD officer during the interrogation in the Lefortovo Prison. He was cleared of all accusations and rehabilitated in 1956.
