= Taldomsky District =

Taldomsky District Талдомский район (Russian)
- District
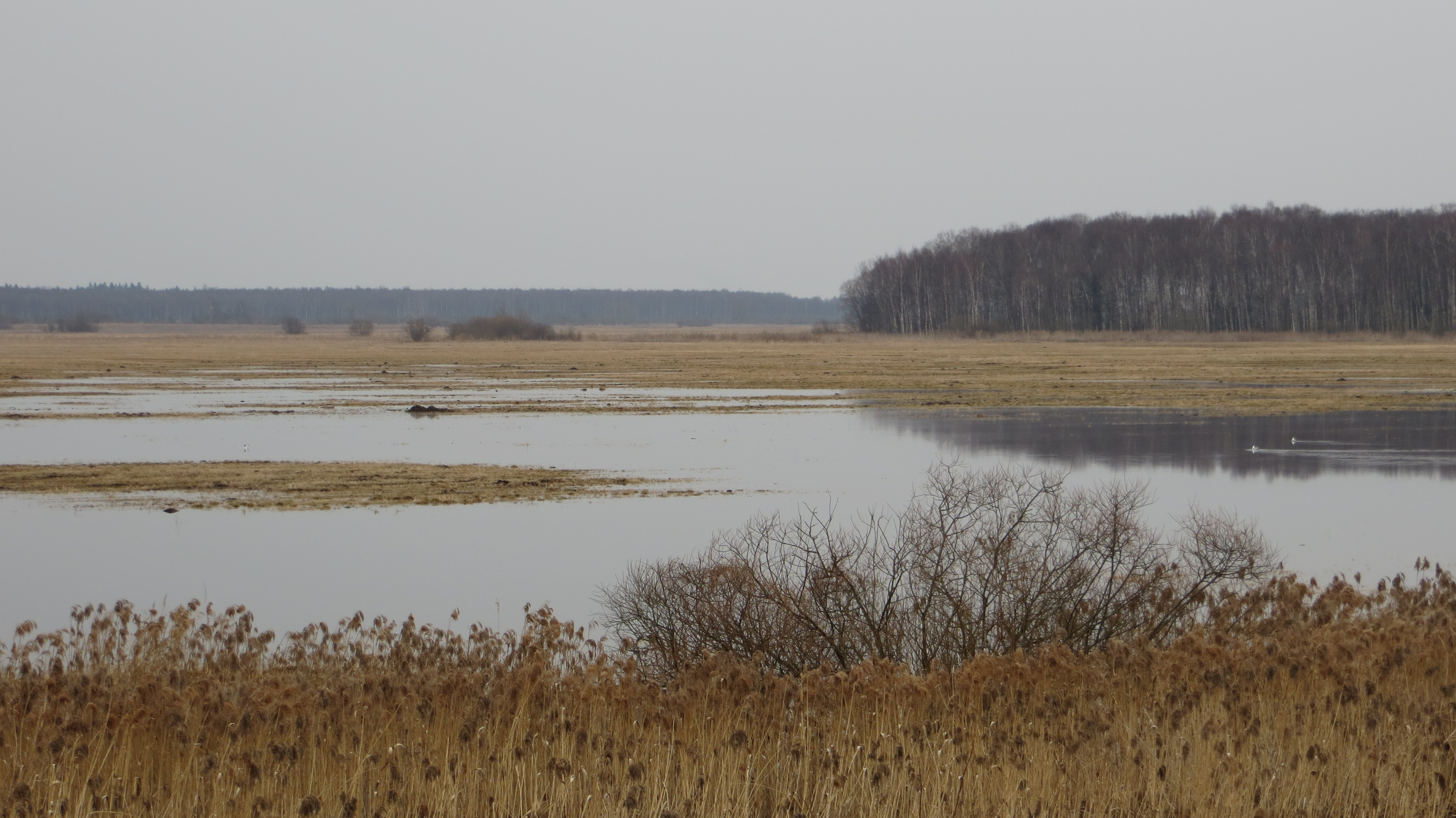
- Zhuravlinaya Rodina, Taldomsky District

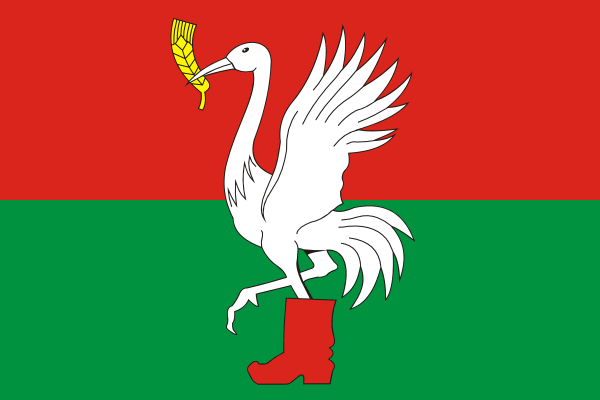
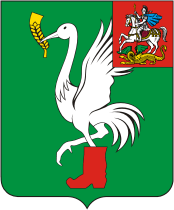
- Flag Coat of arms
- Location of Taldomsky District in Moscow Oblast (before July 2012)
- Coordinates: 56°44′N 37°32′E
- Country: Russia
- Federal subject: Moscow Oblast
- Established: 1929
- Abolished: July 17, 2018
- Administrative center: Taldom

Area
  - Total: 1,426.63 km^{2} (550.82 sq mi)

Population (2010 Census)
  - Total: 48,553
  - Density: 34.033/km^{2} (88.146/sq mi)
  - Urban: 77.8%
  - Rural: 22.2%

Administrative structure
  - Administrative divisions: 1 Towns, 3 Work settlements, 4 Rural settlements
  - Inhabited localities: 1 cities/towns, 3 urban-type settlements, 174 rural localities

Municipal structure
  - Municipally incorporated as: Taldomsky Municipal District
- Time zone: UTC+3 (MSK)
- OKTMO ID: 46654000
- Website: http://taldom-rayon.ru/

Taldomsky District (Russian: Талдомский район) was an administrative and municipal district (raion) in Moscow Oblast, Russia. At 2019, it was located in the north of the oblast and bordered with Tver Oblast in the north, Vladimir Oblast in the northeast, and with Dmitrovsky and Sergiyevo-Posadsky Districts in the south and west. The area of the district is 1,340.52 square kilometers (517.58 sq mi). Its administrative center is the town of Taldom. Population: 48,553 (2010 Census); 46,302 (2002 census); 52,619 (1989 Soviet census). As of 2010, the population of Taldom accounted for 28.5% of the district's total population.

== Geography ==
Average elevation of the district was about 125–150 meters (410–492 ft) above sea level with the highest point of 167 meters (548 ft). Main rivers included the Dubna and the Khotcha; both are right tributaries of the Volga. Moscow Canal which connects the Moskva River with the Volga River formed the western border of the district. Main lakes included Kuznetsovskoye, Salkovskoye, and Zolotaya Veshka, which were located in the north of the district. The district had the second largest reserve of peat in Moscow Oblast.

== History ==
Taldomsky Municipal District was abolished on May 28, 2018, with its territory reorganized as Taldom Urban Okrug. Within the framework of administrative divisions, on May 28, 2018 the inhabited localities of the low-level administrative divisions (the urban and rural settlements) were subordinated to the Town of Taldom, which remained the only subdivision of the administrative district. The administrative district itself was abolished on July 17, 2018, with its territory reorganized as Taldom Town Under Oblast Jurisdiction.

== Administrative and municipal divisions ==
As an administrative division, the district was divided into one town of district significance (Taldom), three urban-type settlements (Severny, Verbilki, and Zaprudnya), and four selsoviets. As a municipal division, the district was incorporated as Taldomsky Municipal District.
