= Verbilki =

Verbilki Вербилки
- Urban-type settlement
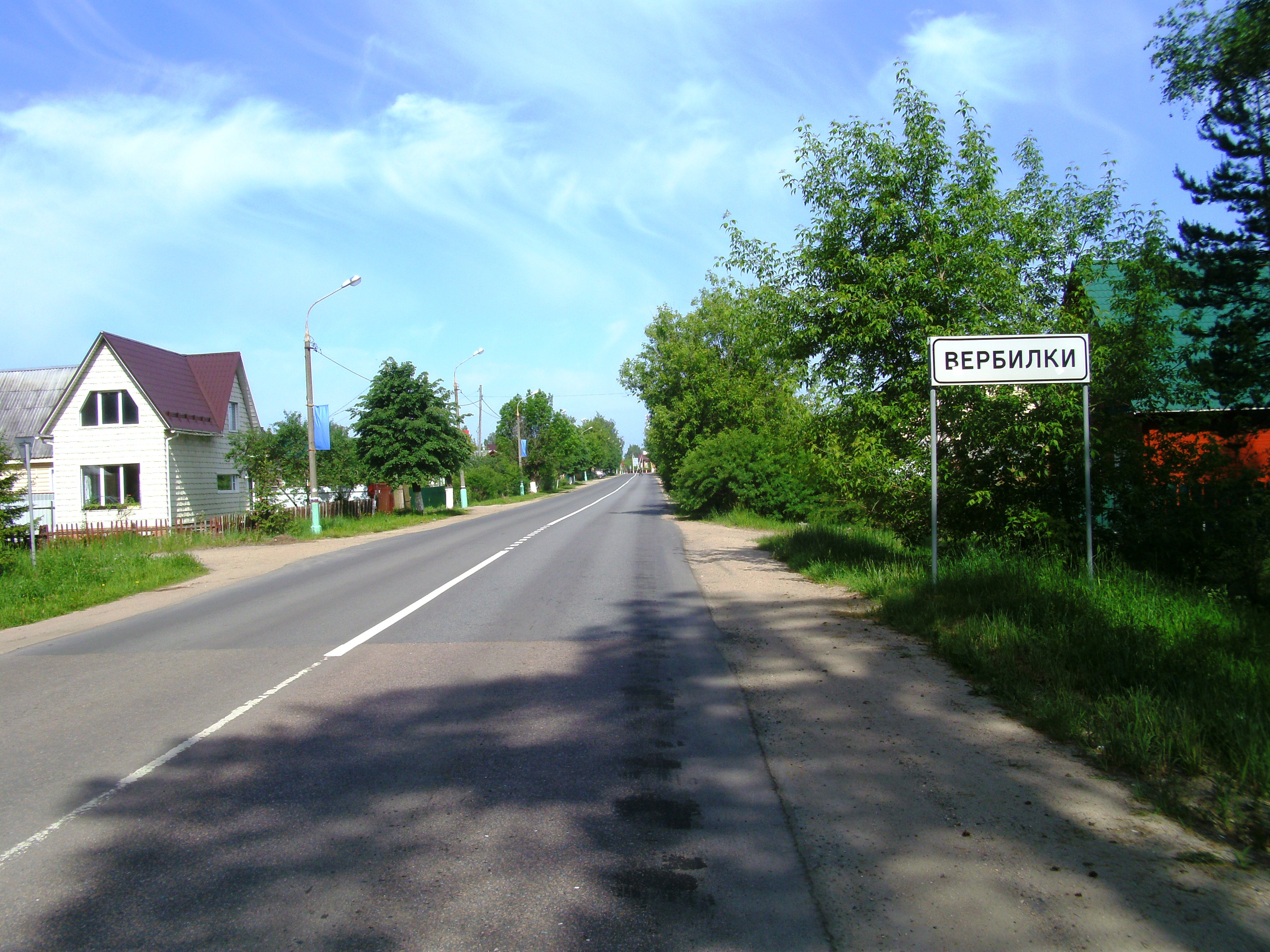
- Entrance sign of Verbilki

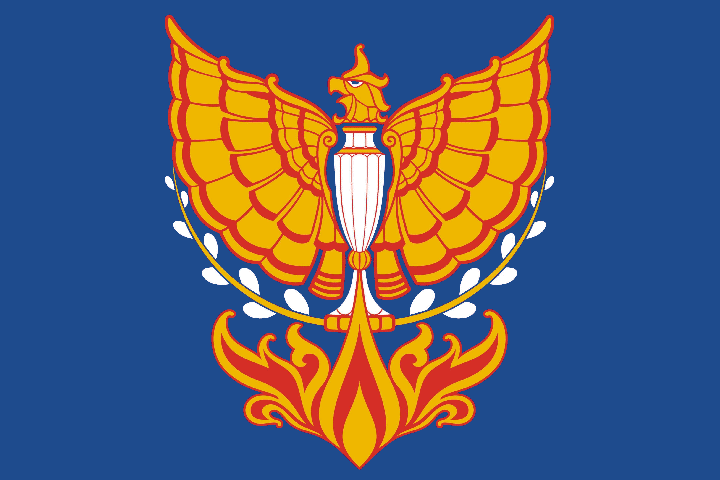
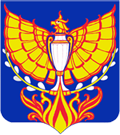
- Flag Coat of arms
- Interactive map of Verbilki
- Location of Verbilki Verbilki (Moscow Oblast)
- Coordinates: 56.5251°N 37.6056°E
- Country: Russia
- Federal subject: Moscow Oblast
- Founded: 16th century (Julian)

Population (2010 Census)
  - Total: 7,022
  - Estimate (2025): 10,153 (+44.6%)

Administrative status
  - Subordinated to: town of oblast significance of Taldom

Municipal status
  - Urban okrug: Taldom Urban Okrug
- Time zone: UTC+3 (MSK)
- Postal code: 141930
- OKTMO ID: 46654154051

Verbilki (Russian: Вербилки) is an urban locality (an urban-type settlement) under the administrative jurisdiction of the town of oblast significance of Taldom in Moscow Oblast, Russia. As a municipal division, Verbilki, together with the town of Taldom, another two urban-type settlements (Severny and Zaprudnya), and a number of rural localities is incorporated as Taldom Urban Okrug. Population: 7,022 (2010 census); 6,764 (2002 census); 8,361 (1989 Soviet census).

Until 2018, Verbilki belonged to Taldomsky District. As part of the reform of the administrative and municipal division of Moscow Oblast, Taldomsky District was abolished, and its territory, including Verbilki, was subordinated to the town of Taldom, which at the same time was elevated to the town of oblast significance. As a municipal division, Taldomsky Municipal District was abolished, and the same territory was incorporated as Taldom Urban Okrug. The formal denomination of the area is since 2018 the town of oblast significance of Taldom with added territory.
