= Zelenograd (disambiguation) =

Zelenograd may refer to:

- Zelenograd, a city in Russia, a part of the federal city of Moscow
- Zelenograd (submarine) (K-506), a Russian Delta-class submarine
- FC Zelenograd, a Russian soccer club of the Russian Second Division
