= Zelenogradsky (urban-type settlement) =

Zelenogradsky Зеленоградский
- Urban-type settlement
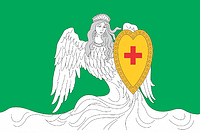
- Flag
- Interactive map of Zelenogradsky
- Location of Zelenogradsky Zelenogradsky (Moscow Oblast)
- Coordinates: 56.1057°N 37.9189°E
- Country: Russia
- Federal subject: Moscow Oblast
- Administrative district: Pushkinsky District
- Founded: 1938

Population (2010 Census)
  - Total: 2,548
  - Estimate (2025): 5,367 (+110.6%)
- Time zone: UTC+3 (MSK)
- Postal code: 141253
- OKTMO ID: 46647154051

Zelenogradsky (Russian: Зеленоградский) is an urban locality (an urban-type settlement) in Pushkinsky District of Moscow Oblast, Russia. Population: 2,548 (2010 census); 2,173 (2002 census); 2,687 (1989 Soviet census).
