= Shuvoyka =

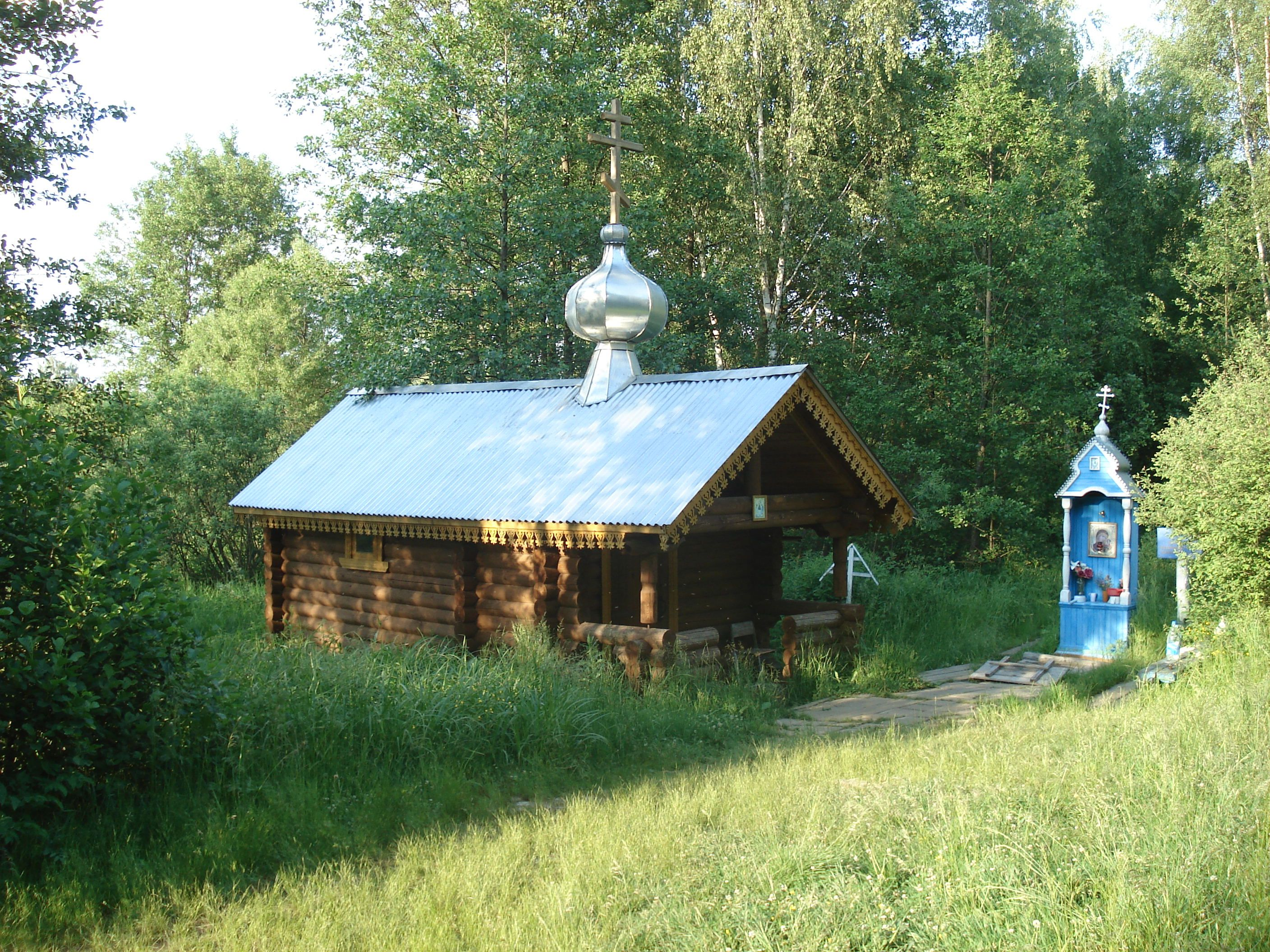
- Сhapel for an Our Lady of Kazan Icon spring on left bank of the Shuvoyka near the village of Gridino
- Native name: Шувойка (Russian)

Location
- Country: Russia

Physical characteristics
- Mouth: Guslitsa
  - coordinates: 55.4781°N 38.9435°E
- Length: 13 km (8.1 mi)

Basin features
- Progression: Guslitsa→ Nerskaya→ Moskva→ Oka→ Volga→ Caspian Sea

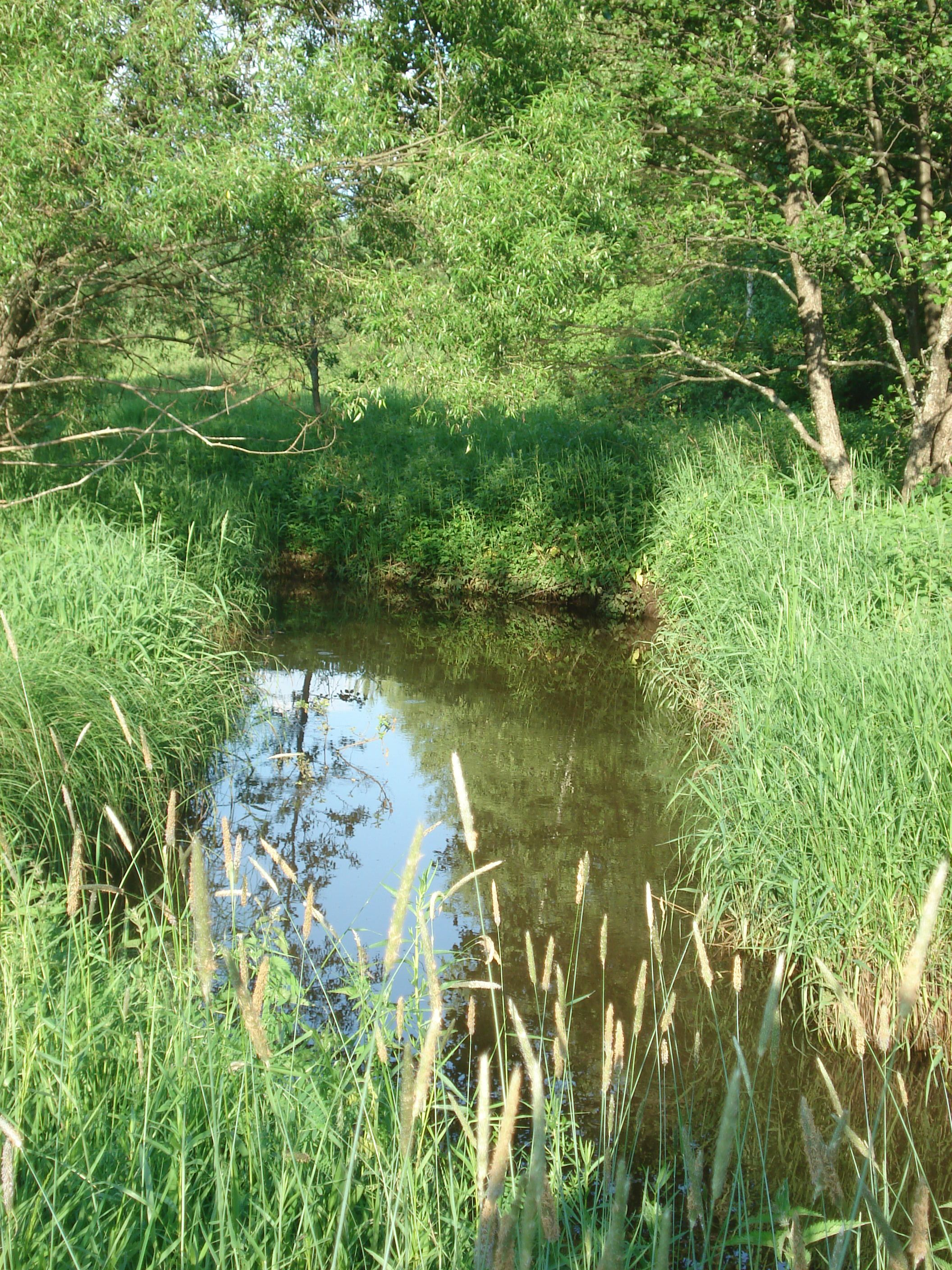
The Shuvoyka near the village of Gridino.

The Shuvoyka (Russian: Шувойка), also known as Shuvoya (Шувоя) is a river in Moscow Oblast, Russia. It is a right tributary of the Guslitsa (Nerskaya's tributary). It is 13 kilometres (8.1 mi) long. Source on northeast in 6 km from the city of Yegoryevsk. Flows all over West, Shuvoyka running into Guslitsa near the village of Ilyinsky Pogost.

The villages of Ryzhoye, Curbatikha, Shuvoye, Gridino, Ustyanovo, Yuryatino are situated on the Shuvoyka.
