= Gridino =

Gridino may refer to:

- Gridino, Orekhovo-Zuyevsky District, Moscow Oblast, a village in Orekhovo-Zuyevsky District of Moscow Oblast, Russia
- Gridino, Yegoryevsky District, Moscow Oblast, a village in Yegoryevsky District of Moscow Oblast, Russia
- Gridino, Nizhny Novgorod Oblast, a village (selo) in Nizhny Novgorod Oblast, Russia
- Gridino, name of several other rural localities in Russia
