= Abramovka, Moscow Oblast =

Abramovka Абра́мовка
- Rural locality
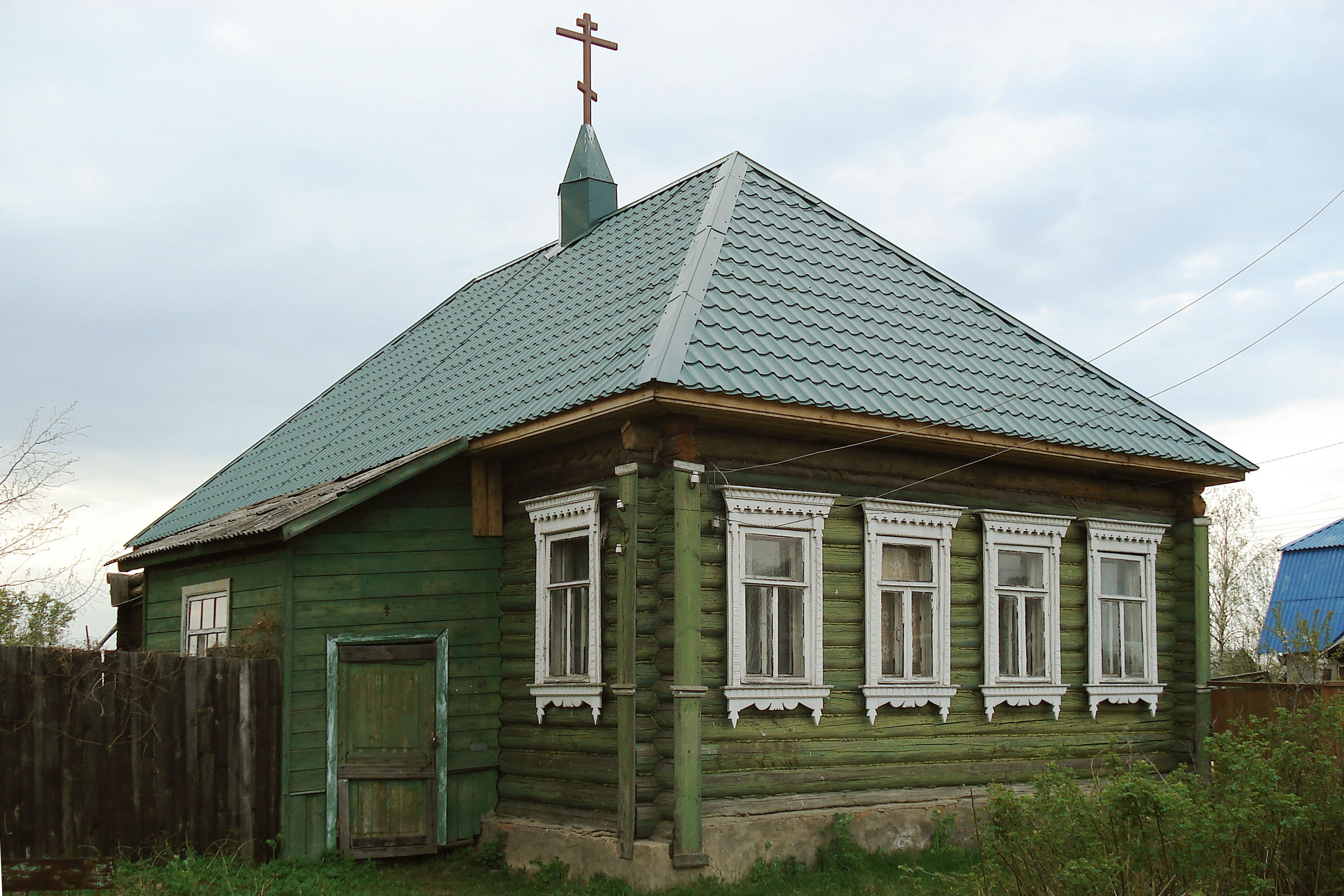
- Old Believers' meeting house in Abramovka
- Interactive map of Abramovka
- Location of Abramovka Abramovka (Moscow Oblast)
- Coordinates: 55°30.76′N 39°0.27′E
- Country: Russia
- Federal subject: Moscow Oblast
- Administrative district: Orekhovo-Zuyevsky District

Population
  - Estimate (2010): 472 )
- Time zone: UTC+3 (MSK)
- Postal code: 142650
- OKTMO ID: 46643431106

Abramovka (Russian: Абра́мовка) is a rural locality (a village) in Orekhovo-Zuyevsky District of Moscow Oblast, Russia.

Municipally, the village is a part of Ilyinskoye Rural Settlement (the administrative center of which is the village of Ilyinsky Pogost). Population: 583 (1997). Postal code: 142650.

== History ==
Abramovka was founded in the 18th century from the villages of Channikovo (Чанниково) and Andreyevo (Андреево).

The village is located in the historical area of Ramenye (a part of Guslitsa). In the 19th century, it was a state-owned village of Bezzubovskaya Volost of Bogoroditsky Uyezd of Moscow Governorate. The overwhelming majority of the population of Abramovka were Old Believers, who from the end of the 19th century were guided by the Russian Orthodox Old-Rite Church.

In the early 1830s, peasant Anton Muravlyov began building a weaving factory in Abramovka. The factory produced its first fabric in 1843. By 1856, the factory employed 118 weavers operating 90 looms. Soon after, another weaving mill was opened by peasant Pyotr Stulov. At first, his factory employed only twelve weavers operating eleven looms. Two more weaving mills followed soon after; both built by Bogoroditsk merchants Yevstigney and Ivan Morkovkin. One of their mills employed 87 weavers operating 70 looms, another—99 weavers operating 85 looms.

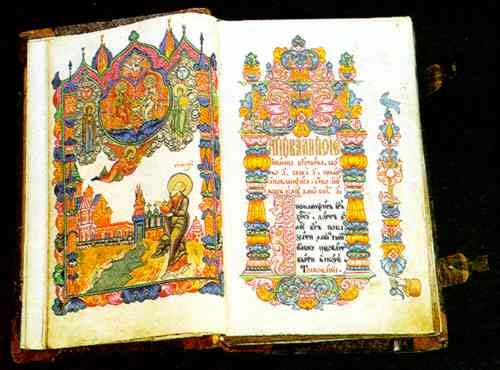
The Old Believers' book-painting of Apocalypse with the commentaries of Andreas of Caesarea. By Mitelkov, Guslitsa, 1859.

In 1890, Anton Muravlyov opened the dye works employing ninety workers. At the same time, two more dye works were opened—one by Minador Muravlyov (employing fifteen people) and another by Gabriel Biryukov (six people).

Neither of these factories are operational now.

Copying of Old Believers manuscripts, books, and producing so-called book-paintings were the crafts developed in Abramovka. In the 1860s–1870s, an underground Old Believers press was operated in Abramovka by peasant Yevsey Piskunov.

== Population ==
In 1852, the village consisted of 122 homesteads comprising 905 inhabitants (437 male and 468 female). By 1862, the population decreased slightly, with 149 homesteads comprising 874 people (435 male and 439 female). As of January 1, 1997, the population was 583.
