= Slobodishche, Moscow Oblast =

Rural locality in Moscow Oblast, Russia

Coordinates: 55°30′23″N 38°51′31″E

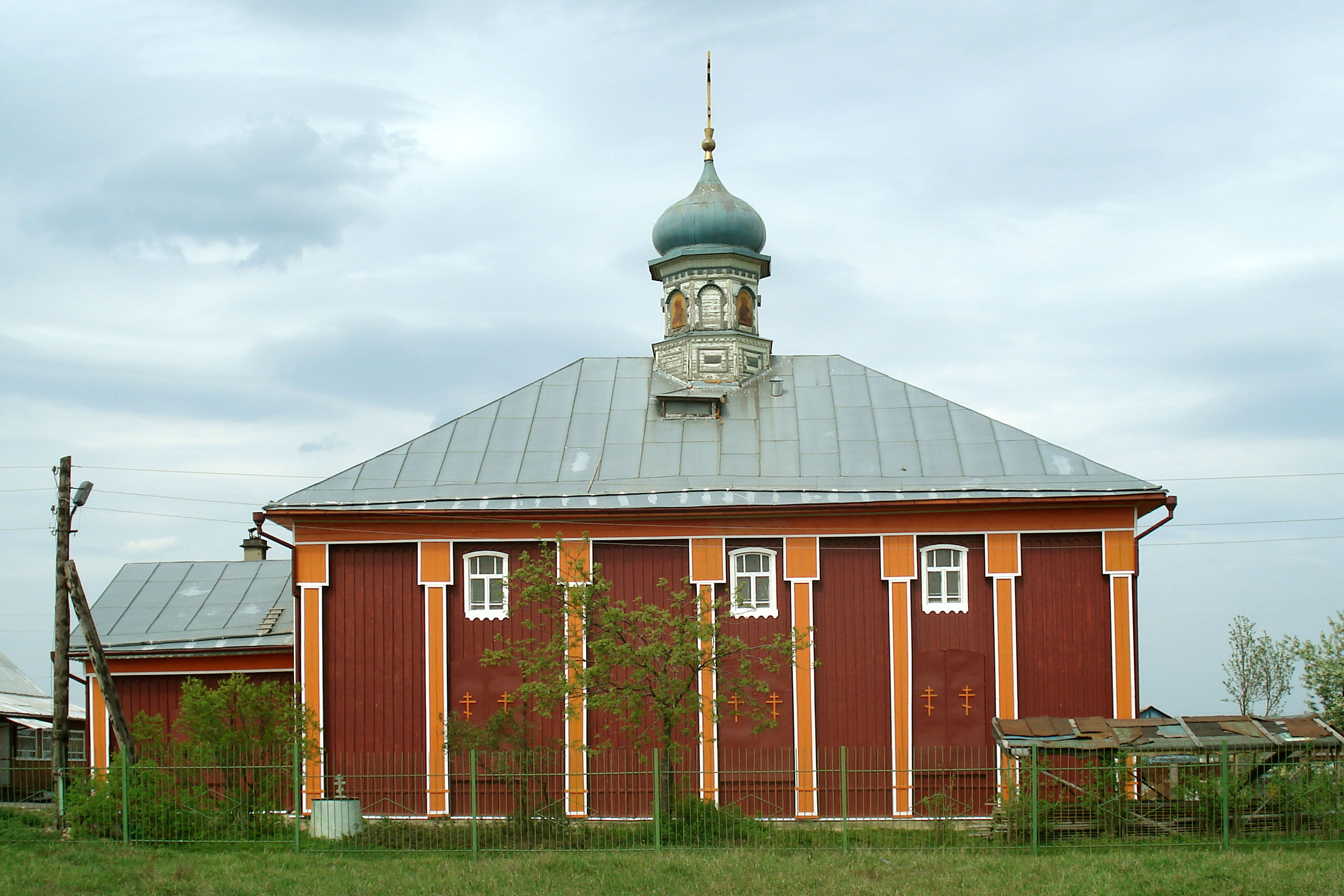
Slobodishche. Old Believers' Our Lady of Kazan wooden church

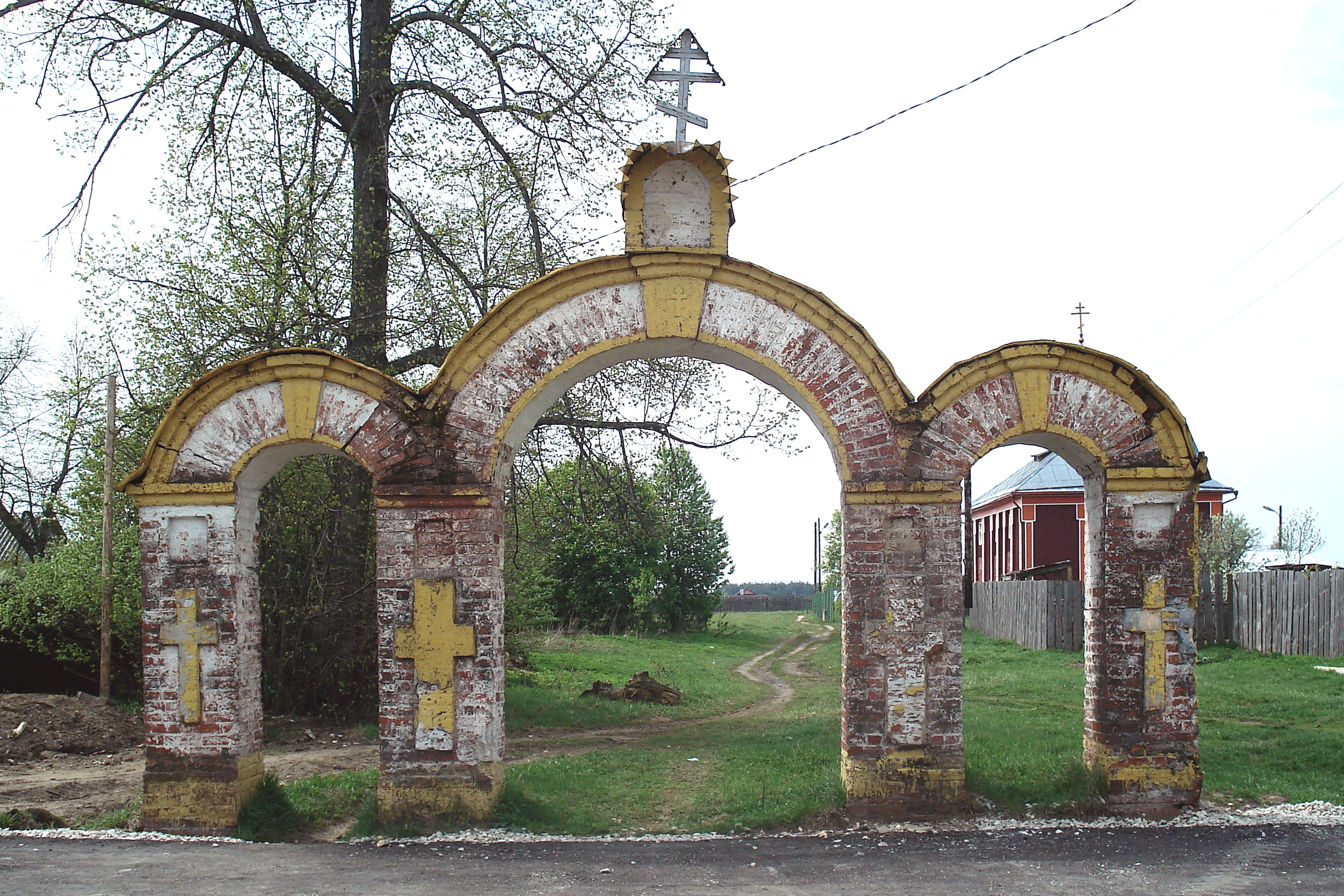
Slobodishche. Ruins of arched gates

Slobodishche (Russian: Слободи́ще) is a village of 327 people (1997) in the Orekhovo-Zuyevsky District of Moscow Oblast, Russia, on the Guslitsa River (Nerskaya's tributary) some 93 kilometers (58 mi) southeast of Moscow. It is municipally a part of the Ilyinskoye Rural Settlement (whose administrative center is Ilyinsky Pogost). First mentioned in 1674, it is in the historical area of Guslitsa (formerly Guslitskaya volost). The Old Believers' (Russian Orthodox Old-Rite Church) Our Lady of Kazan wooden church was built here around 1881.
