= Kurovskoye, Moscow Oblast =

Town in Moscow Oblast, Russia

Kurovskoye Куровское
- Town
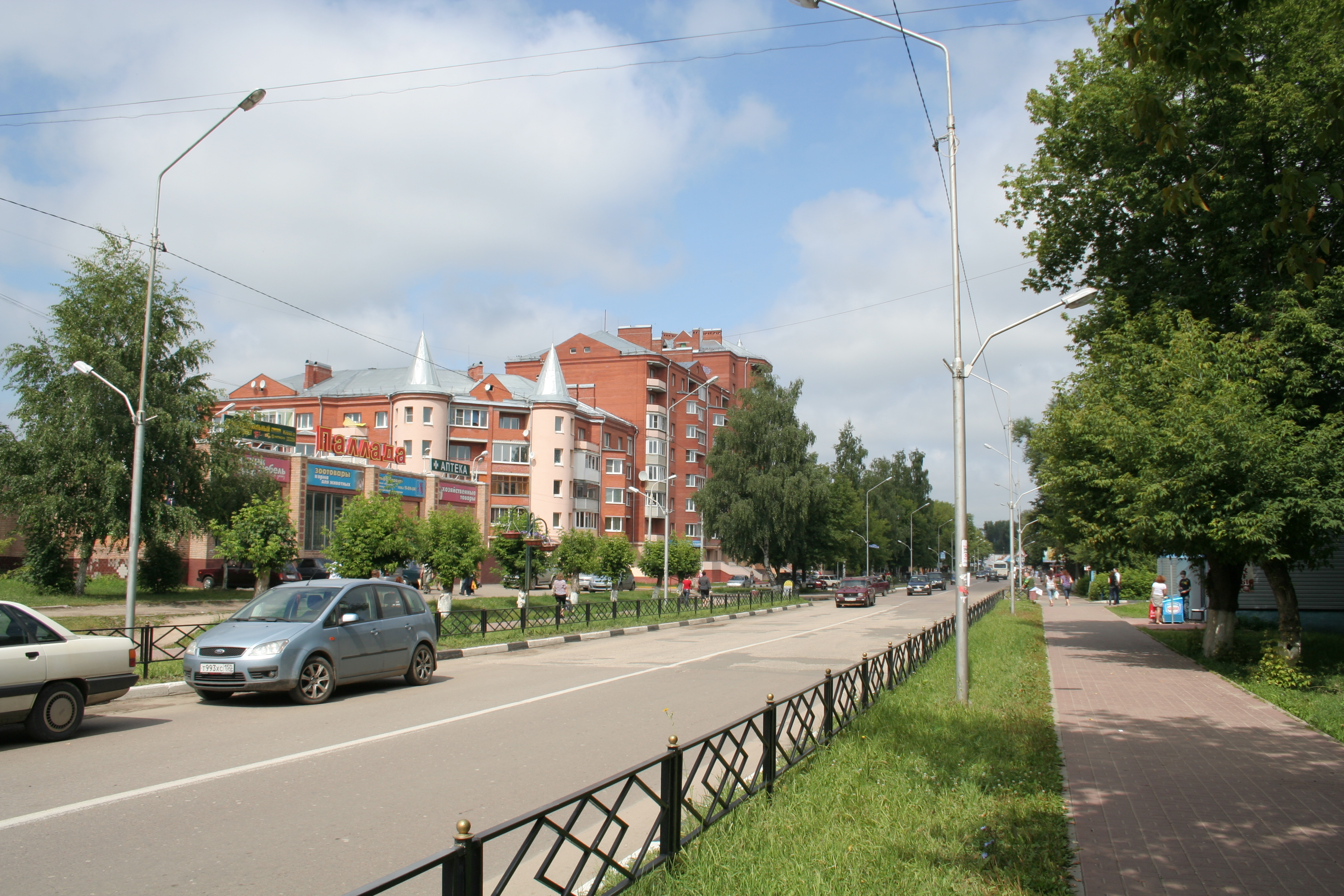
- A street in Kurovskoye

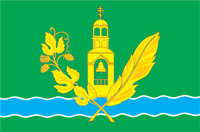
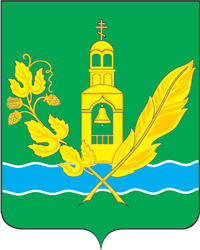
- Flag Coat of arms
- Interactive map of Kurovskoye
- Location of Kurovskoye Kurovskoye (Moscow Oblast)
- Coordinates: 55°35′N 38°55′E
- Country: Russia
- Federal subject: Moscow Oblast
- Administrative district: Orekhovo-Zuyevsky District
- TownSelsoviet: Kurovskoye
- First mentioned: 16th century
- Town status since: 1952
- Elevation: 120 m (390 ft)

Population (2010 Census)
  - Total: 21,819
  - Estimate (2025): 19,931 (−8.7%)

Administrative status
  - Capital of: Town of Kurovskoye

Municipal status
  - Municipal district: Orekhovo-Zuyevsky Municipal District
  - Urban settlement: Kurovskoye Urban Settlement
  - Capital of: Kurovskoye Urban Settlement
- Time zone: UTC+3 (MSK)
- Postal codes: 142620, 142621
- OKTMO ID: 46757000011
- Website: www.kurovskoye.ru

Kurovskoye (Russian: Куровско́е) is a town in Orekhovo-Zuyevsky District of Moscow Oblast, Russia, located on the Nerskaya River (Moskva's tributary) 92 kilometers (57 mi) southeast of Moscow. Population: 21,819 (2010 census); 19,507 (2002 census); 21,139 (1989 Soviet census).

== History ==
It was first mentioned in the 16th century as a small settlement of Kurovsky (Куровский). In 1646, it was mentioned as the village of Kurovskaya (Куровская). In 1952, it was renamed Kurovskoye and granted town status.

== Administrative and municipal status ==
Within the framework of administrative divisions, it is incorporated within Orekhovo-Zuyevsky District as the Town of Kurovskoye. As a municipal division, the Town of Kurovskoye is incorporated within Orekhovo-Zuyevsky Municipal District as Kurovskoye Urban Settlement.

== Religion ==
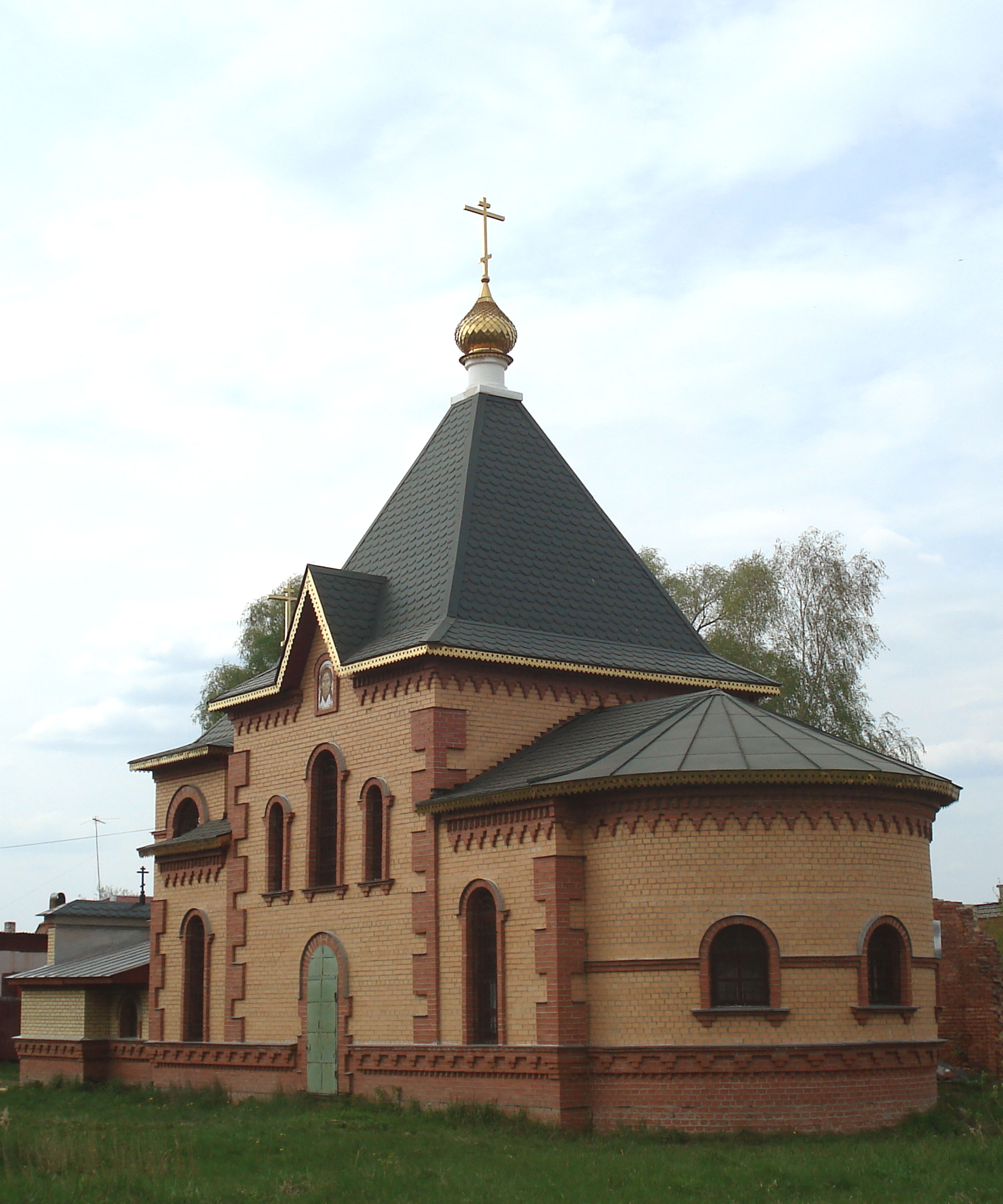
Yedinoveriye Church of John Climacus in Kurovskoye (2000)

Geographically, Kurovskoye is located in what historically used to be the area of Guslitsa. The overwhelming majority of the population of the village of Kurovskaya were Old Believers. Presently, Kurovskoye is home to Guslitsky Spaso-Preobrazhensky Monastery (Russian Orthodox Church) and a Yedinoveriye Church of John Climacus.
