= Desna (Guslitsa) =

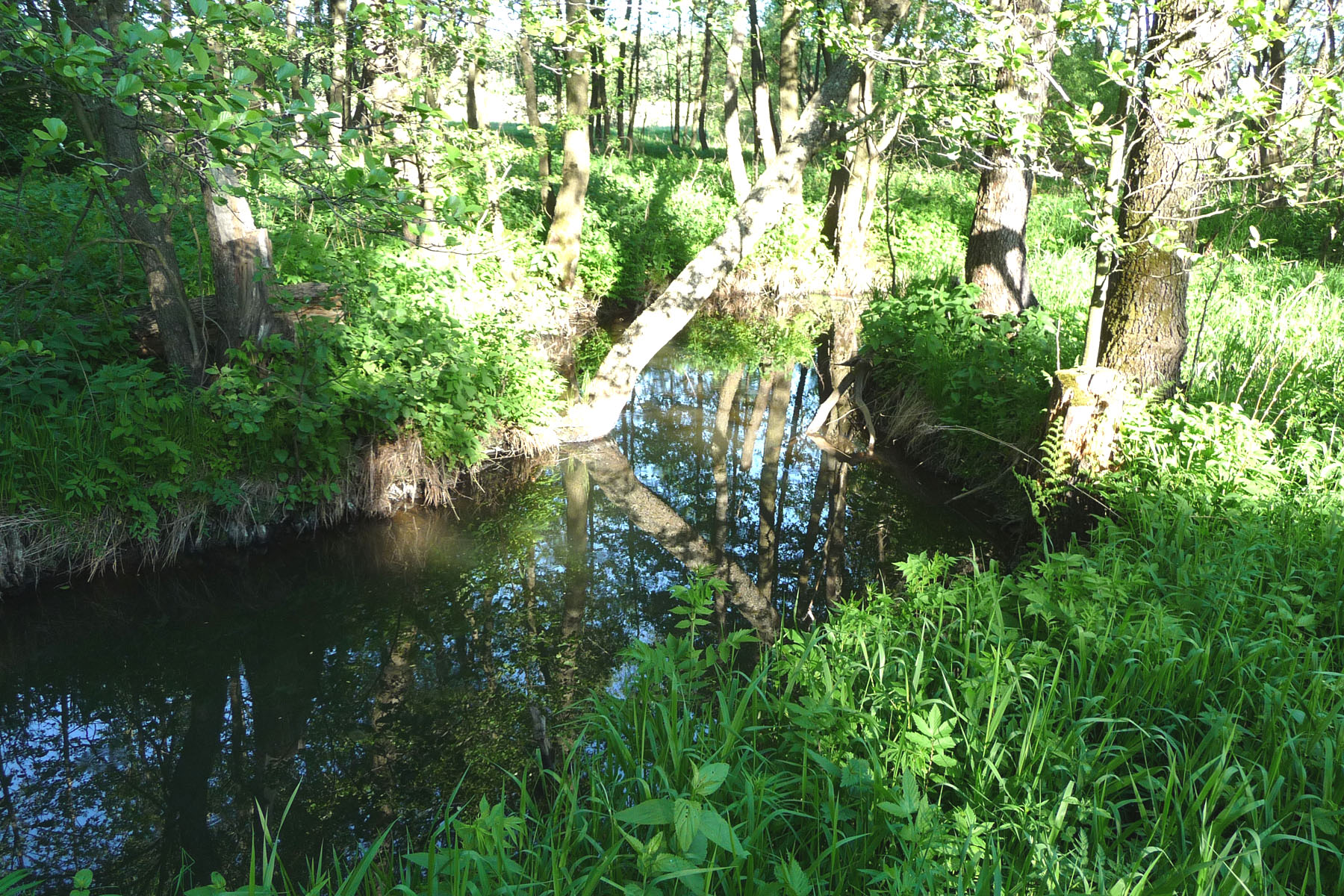
- Desna River near the village of Chichevo
- Native name: Десна (Russian)

Location
- Country: Russia

Physical characteristics
- Mouth: Guslitsa
  - coordinates: 55°29′13″N 38°55′24″E
- Length: 17 km (11 mi)
- Basin size: 81 km^{2} (31 sq mi)

Basin features
- Progression: Guslitsa→ Nerskaya→ Moskva→ Oka→ Volga→ Caspian Sea

The Desna (Russian: Десна) is a river in Moscow Oblast, Russia. It is a left tributary of the Guslitsa (Nerskaya's tributary). It is 17 kilometres (11 mi) long, and has a drainage basin of 81 square kilometres (31 sq mi). The Desna River freezes up in November–December and stays under the ice until April.

Source of the river is in the Voskresensky District near the meeting point of the borders of three districts of the Moscow Oblast Voskresensky, Yegoryevsky and Orekhovo-Zuyevsky. Flows all over North, Desna running into Guslitsa about the village of Tsaplyno.

The Orekhovo-Zuyevsky District's villages: Mosyagino, Chichevo, Baryshevo, Kostenevo, Bezzubovo, Yuryatino are situated on the Desna.

In the higher and middle parts of the stream it has almost entirely lost its forest cover: upstream — because of the extraction of phosphorites, in the middle part — because of the plowing.

== Sources ==
1. Russian: Vagner B. B. Rivers and Lakes of the Moscow Area. — М.:Veche, 2007, — p. 92. ISBN 5-9533-1885-5.
2. Russian: Moscow Oblast. Detailed Atlas. M 1:200 000. — М.:Eksmo, 2008, — p. 40. ISBN 978-5-699-26348-6.
