= Zaponorye =

Rural locality in Moscow Oblast, Russia

Coordinates: 55°38.286′N 38°51.86′E

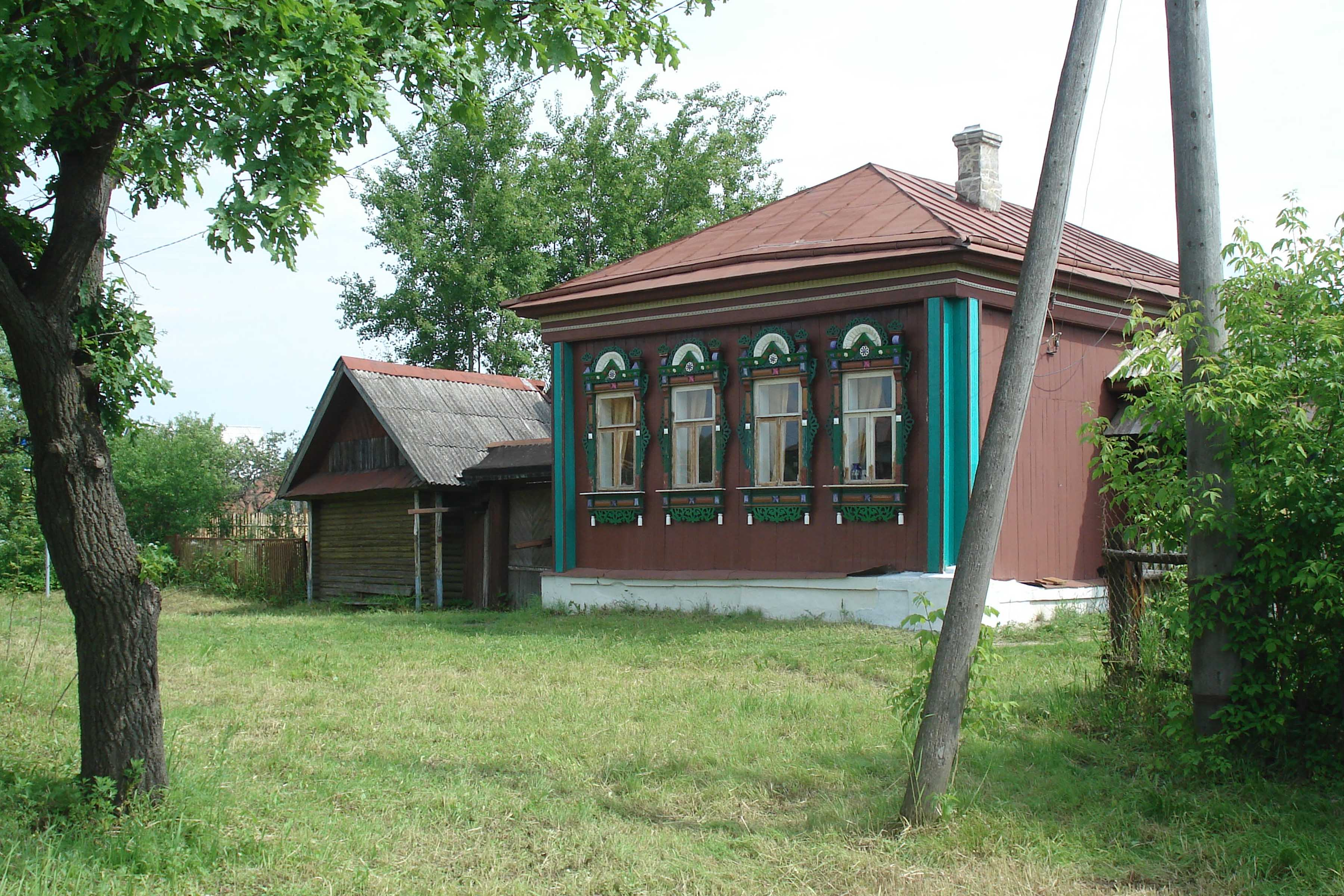
The village of Zaponorye

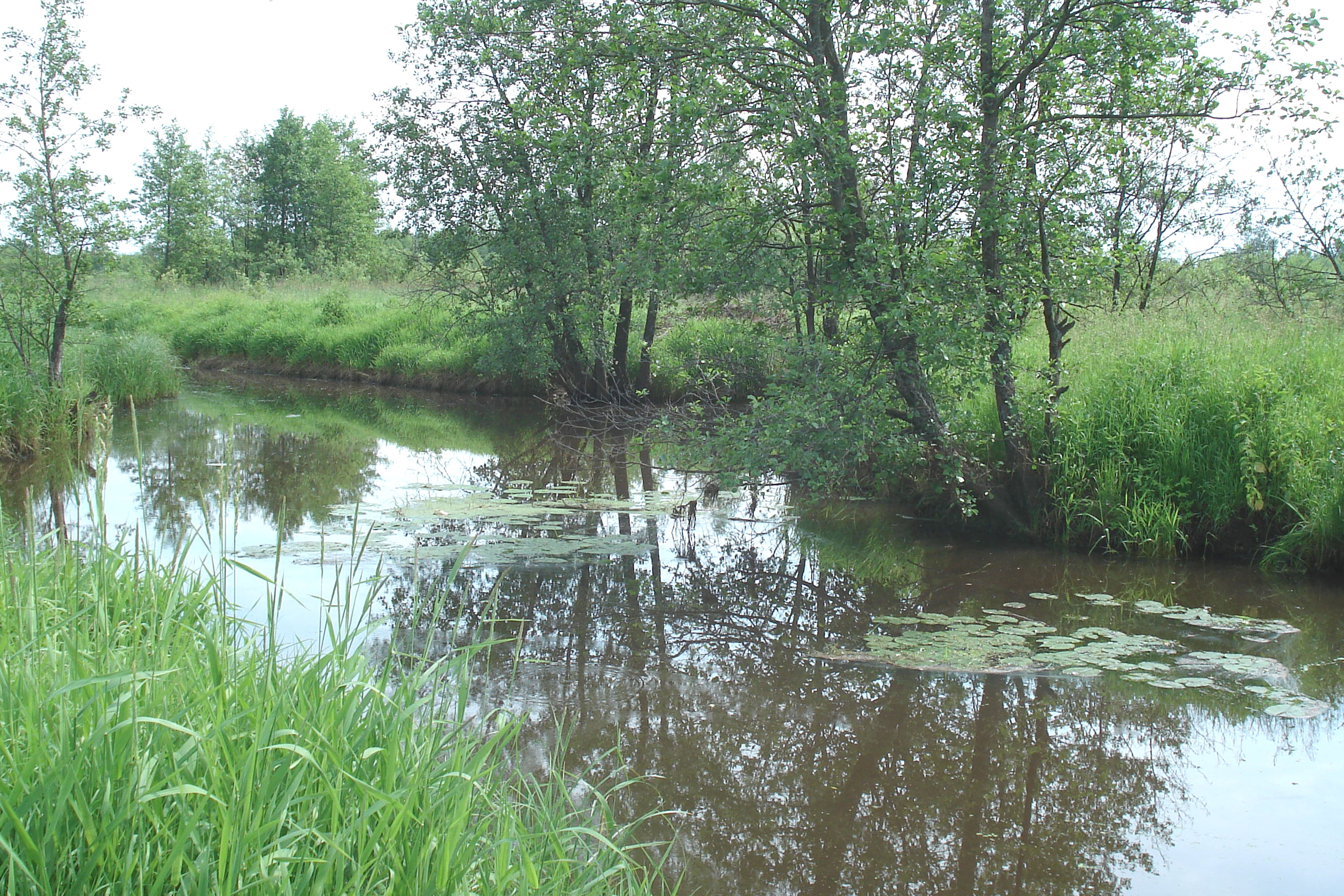
The Ponor near Zaponorye

Zaponorye (Russian: Запоно́рье) is a village in Orekhovo-Zuyevsky District of Moscow Oblast, Russia, located on the river Ponor (a tributary of the Nerskaya).

Municipally, the village is a part of Davydovsky Rural Settlement (the administrative center of which is the village of Davydovo). Population: 135 (1997 est.). Postal code: 142641.

The village is located in the historical area of Guslitsa.

== History ==
Zaponorye was first mentioned in 1587. The village was a part of the land owned by Chudov Monastery in Moscow. At that time, the village was also known as Vlasyevskoye (Вла́сьевское).

According to the cadastres of 1623—1624, the wooden Pokrov Church of Our Lady was located in the village of Zaponorye/Vlasyevskoye. In 1678, the village was home to ten peasant homesteads, which comprised 36 people.

In the 19th century, Zaponorye had a status of a selo and served as a center of Zaponorskaya Volost of Bogoroditsky Uyezd of Moscow Governorate.

As of 1852, the village consisted of 72 homesteads comprising 391 people. By 1862, the population declined to 59 homesteads comprising 359 people (168 male and 191 female). Apart from the Orthodox Church, there was also an Old Believers' chapel. Twice a year, on May 20 and October 1, a fair (Zaponorskaya yarmarka) was held in the village.

In 1925, the village population was 611 people in 115 households.

In 1940, the church in Zaponorye was closed, and in 1948 it was completely demolished.
