= Gridino, Yegoryevsky District, Moscow Oblast =

Village in Russia

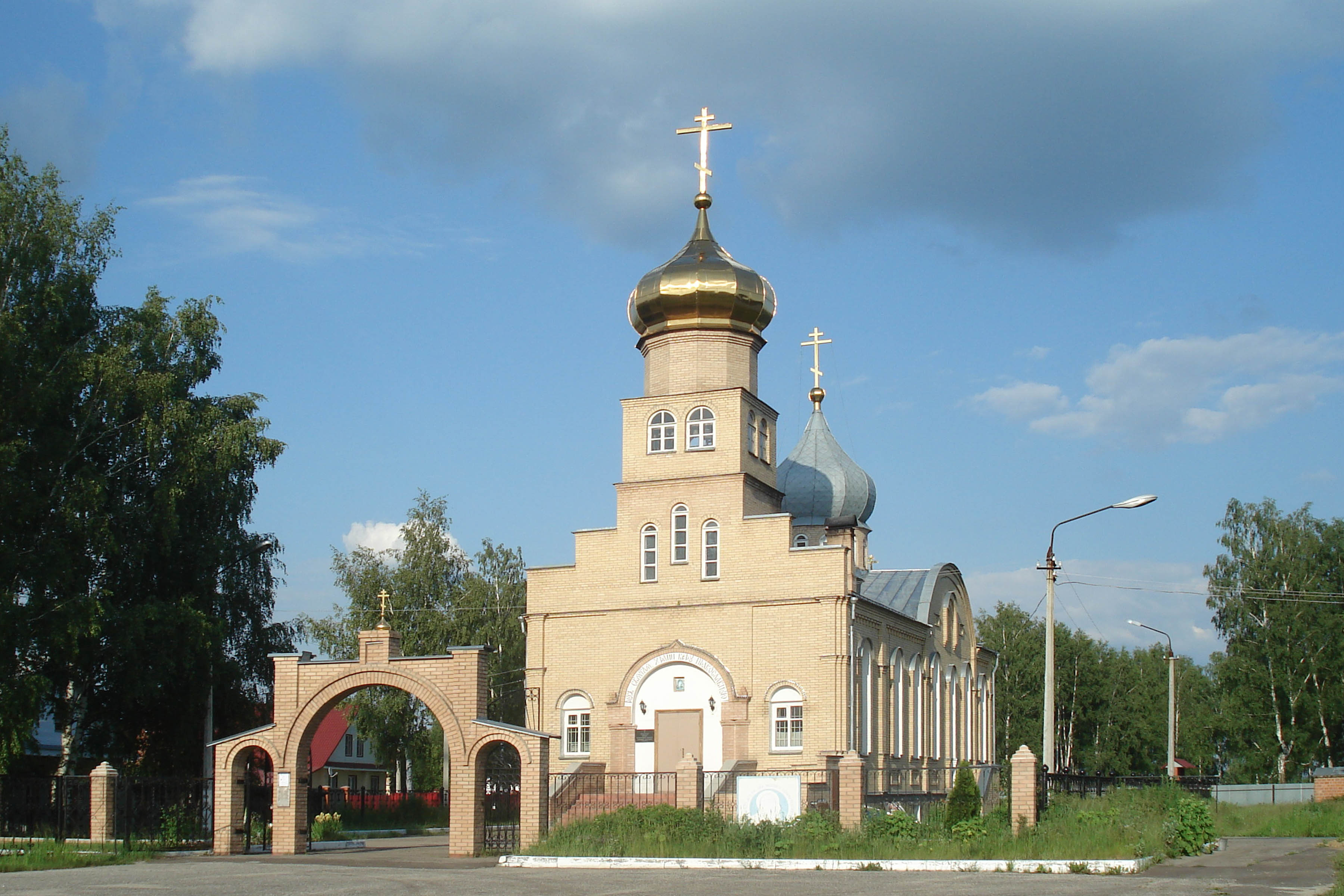
Gridino-Shuvoye. Our Lady of Kazan Church

Gridino (Russian: Гри́дино) is a village in Yegoryevsky District of Moscow Oblast, Russia, located on the Shuvoyka River (Guslitsa River's tributary), in the historical area of Guslitsa. Informally, the village is also known as Gridino-Shuvoye (Гри́дино-Шуво́е). Municipally, the village is a part of Shuvoyskoye Rural Settlement (the administrative center of which is the settlement of Shuvoye). Postal code: 140301. Dialing code: +7 49640.

The village was first mentioned in 1673.

== Our Lady of Kazan Church ==
The first wooden temple in honor of Our Lady of Kazan was built in the village in 1673. In 1864, after it burned down, a new wooden temple was constructed in its place. The new temple was in service until 1959, when it was disassembled and its logs used to build a kindergarten in the nearby village of Selivanikha. On the opening day, however, the kindergarten building completely burned down.

New stone Russian Orthodox Church was consecrated in place of the old wooden one on September 18, 1999.

== Spring and Our Lady of Kazan Icon Chapel near the Shuvoyka ==
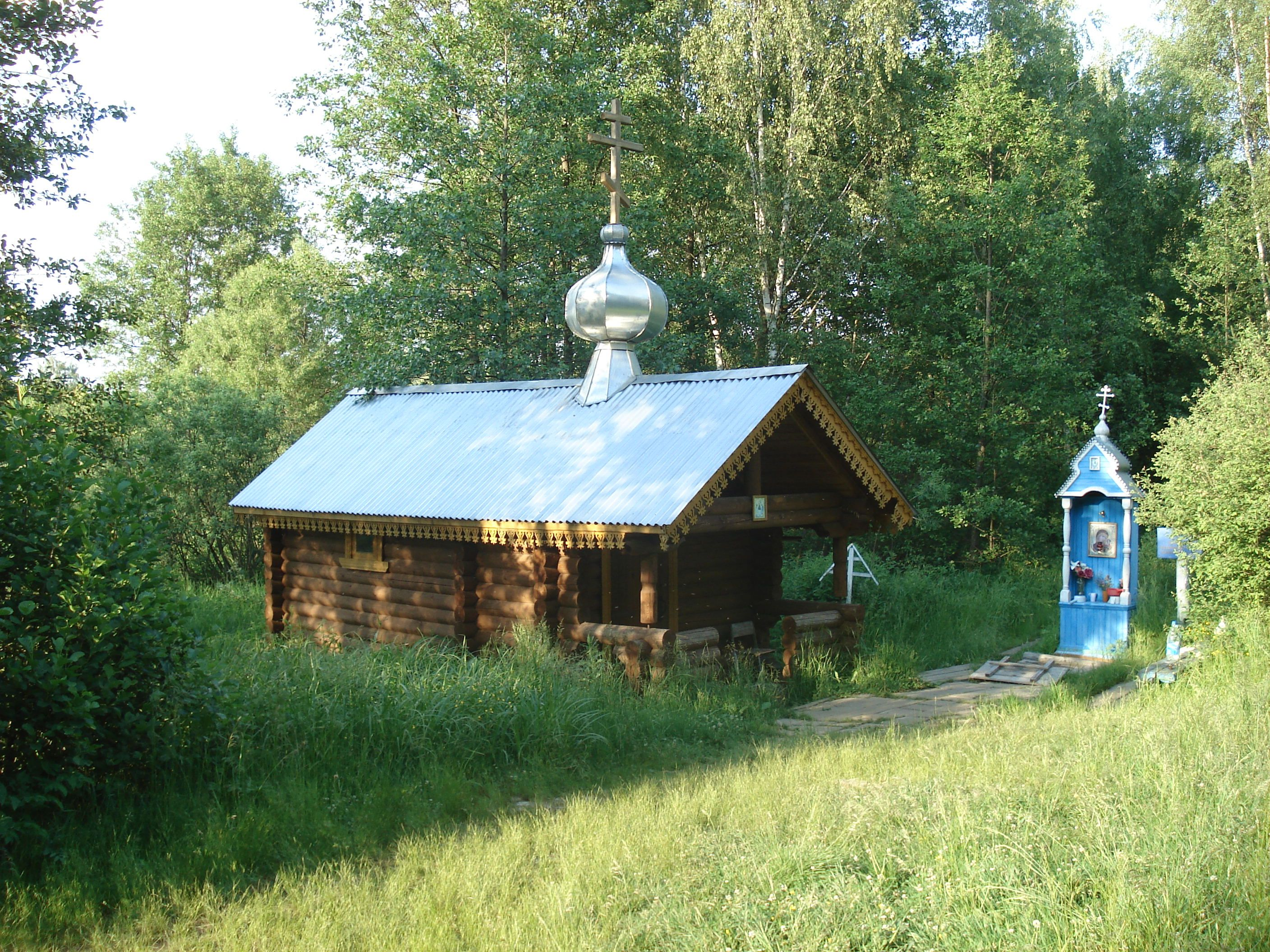
Сhapel near Our Lady of Kazan springs on the left bank of the Shuvoyka River near to the village of Gridino

A well, consisting of three small springs, is located on the left bank of the Shuvoyka River, 20 meters (66 ft) from the river and 500 meters (1,600 ft) south of the western extremity of the village (at 55°30.72′N 38°47.55′E)

The springs are believed to have appeared during the Polish invasion in the beginning of the 17th century. According to legends, when some of the Poles and their followers stood at the place of the current Yegoryevsk, where False Dmitry II was later defeated by Prince Dmitry Pozharsky, on the bank of the Shuvoyka River the Russian troops fought one of the Polish detachments. Both sides have suffered severe losses, and the blood that was shed led to the appearance of the icon of Our Lady of Kazan and the three springs. Later on, in 1673, a small wooden chapel was built on the high bank of the river in 1673; it was later re-built after the fire of 1864 and completely dismantled for construction materials during the anti-religious campaign in 1966.

For over three centuries, the place had remained popular among the pilgrims. In the early 1970s, there was an unsuccessful attempt to carry out reclamation work.

Currently, a small chapel and a sign explaining the appearance of the Our Lady of Kazan Icon are located near the springs.
