= Ustyanovo, Moscow Oblast =

Village in Moscow Oblast, Russia

Coordinates: 55°28.655′N 38°59.455′E

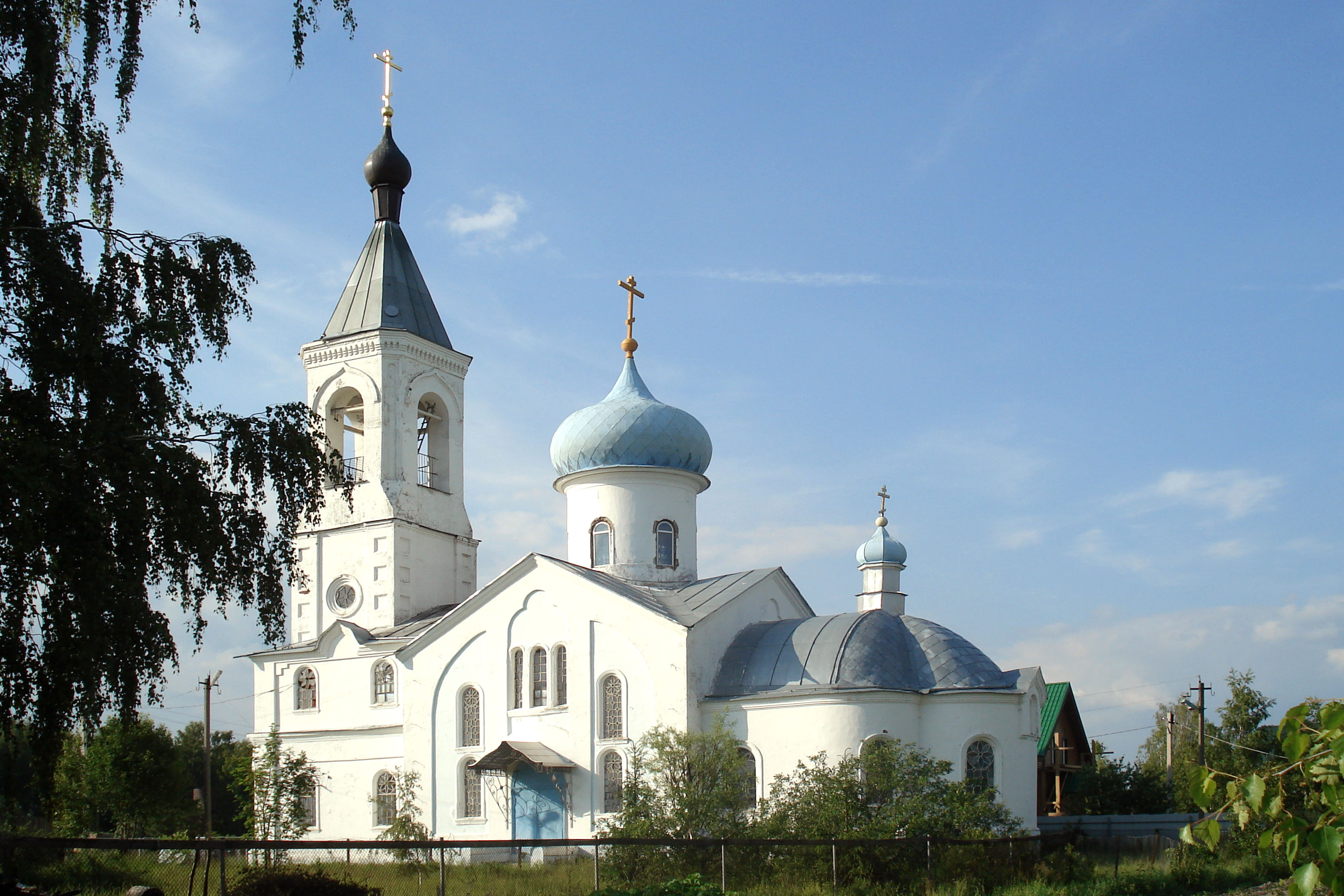
Saint Nicholas Old Believers church in Ustyanovo. Architect N. G. Martyanov, 1914

Ustyanovo (Russian: Устья́ново) is a village in Orekhovo-Zuyevsky District of Moscow Oblast, Russia, located on the Shuvoyka River.

Municipally, the village is a part of Ilyinskoye Rural Settlement (the administrative center of which is the village of Ilyinsky Pogost). Population: 106 (1997 est.). Postal code: 142650.

The village is located in the historical area of Guslitsa.
