= Ustyanovo =

Ustyanovo may refer to:

- Ustyanovo, Moscow Oblast, a village in Moscow Oblast, Russia
- Ustyanovo, Vologda Oblast, a village (selo) in Vologda Oblast, Russia
