= Slobodishche =

Slobodishche may refer to:

- Slobodishche, Bryansk Oblast, a village (selo) in Bryansk Oblast, Russia
- Slobodishche, Moscow Oblast, a village in Moscow Oblast, Russia
- Slobodishche, Tver Oblast, a village in Tver Oblast, Russia
