= Khoteichi =

Rural locality in Moscow Oblast, Russia

Coordinates: 55°30.18′N 38°46.85′E

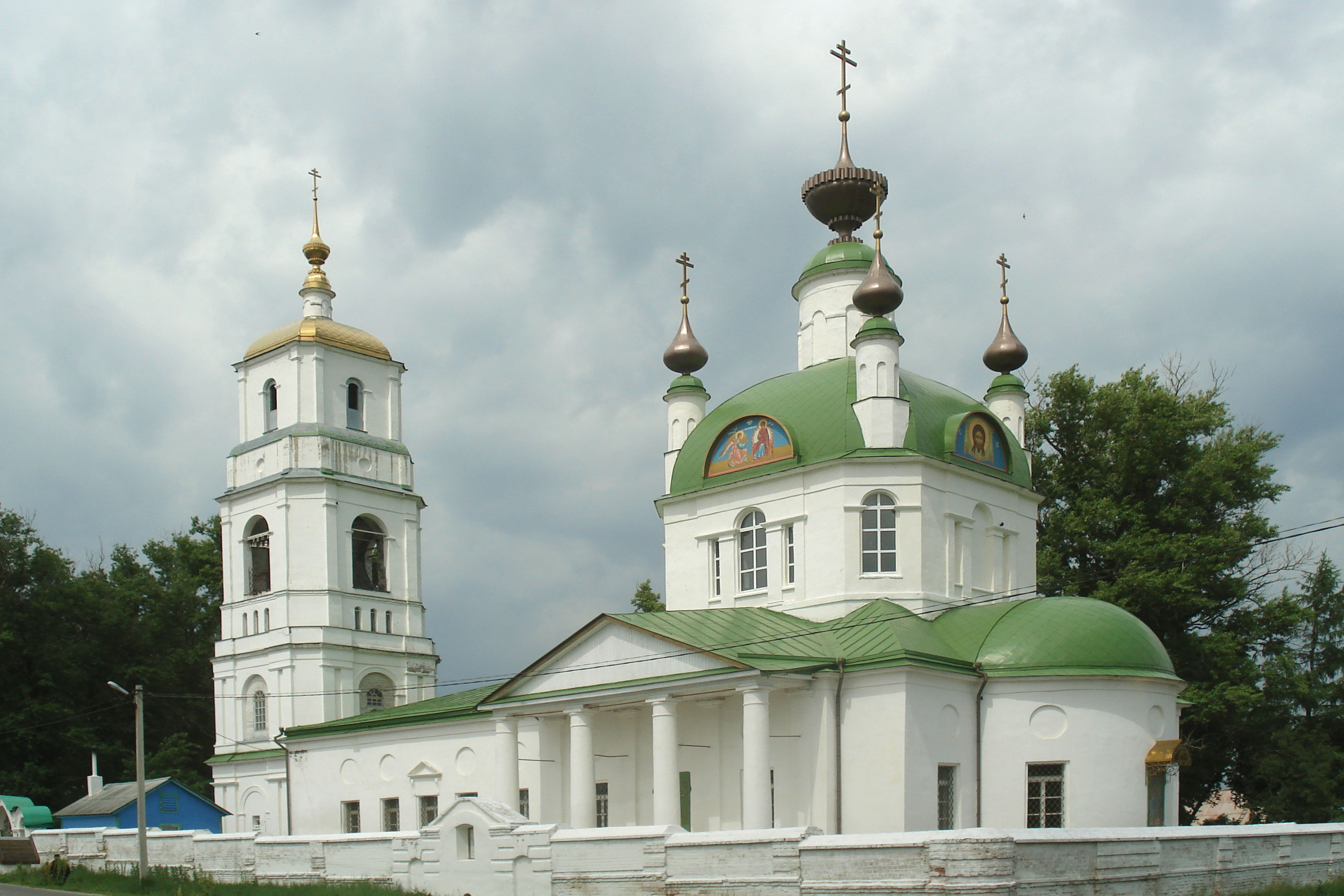
Khoteichi. Trinity church. 1823

Khoteichi (Russian: Хоте́ичи) is a village (selo) in Orekhovo-Zuyevsky District of Moscow Oblast, Russia, located on the Nerskaya River (Moskva's tributary). Municipally, the village is a part of Sobolevskoye Rural Settlement (the administrative center of which is the village of Sobolevo). Population: 751 (1997). Postal code: 142649.

Khoteichi was first mentioned in 1631.

A Trinity church (of the Moscow Patriarchate) is located in Khoteichi. The church was consecrated in 1823. In 1939, the church was closed and partially destroyed. Restoration of the church has begun in 1995.

The village is located in the historical area of Guslitsa.
