= Shuvoye =

Rural locality in Yegoryevsky District, Moscow Oblast, Russia

Coordinates: 55°28′28.308″N 39°5′18.718″E

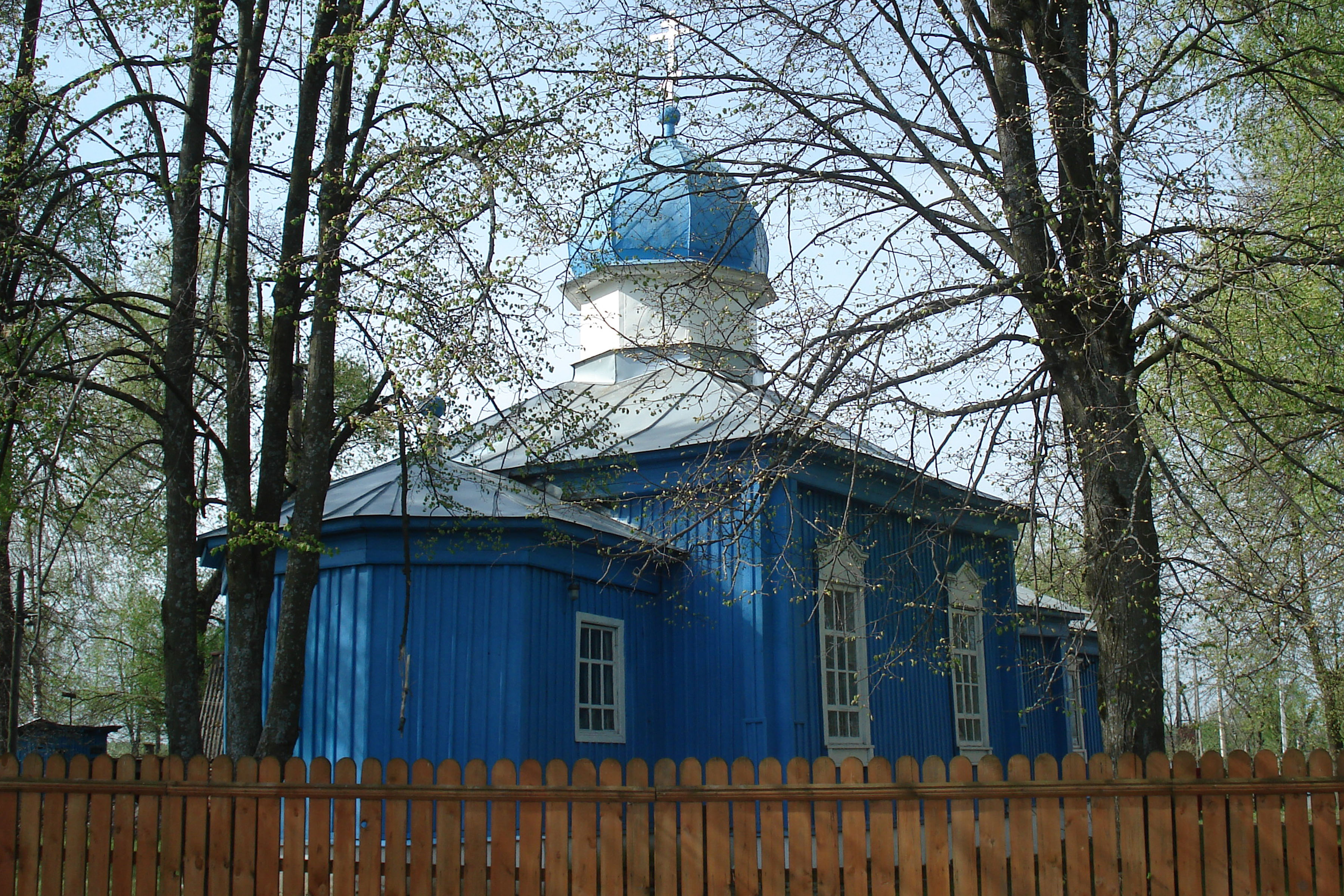
Old Believers' Trinity Church in Shuvoye

Shuvoye (Russian: Шуво́е) is a settlement in Yegoryevsky District of Moscow Oblast, Russia, located on the Shuvoyka River (Guslitsa's tributary). Shuvoye is the administrative center of Shuvoyskoye Rural Settlement. Postal code: 140342. Dialing code: +7 49640.

== History ==
The settlement was founded in 1627. In 1935, it was granted urban-type settlement status. During Soviet times, it was called Krasny Tkach (Кра́сный Ткач, lit. red weaver); the original name was restored in August 2001. In December 2001, it was demoted to a settlement of rural type.

The settlement is located in the historical area of Guslitsa. There is a wooden Old Believers' (Russian Orthodox Old-Rite Church) Trinity Church built in 1924 in Shuvoye, a rare instance of a church having been built during the Soviet era.
