= Volnaya =

Volnaya may refer to:

- Sviatlana Volnaya (born 1979), Belarusian women's basketball player
- Volnaya River, river in Moscow Oblast, Russia
