= Volnaya (river) =

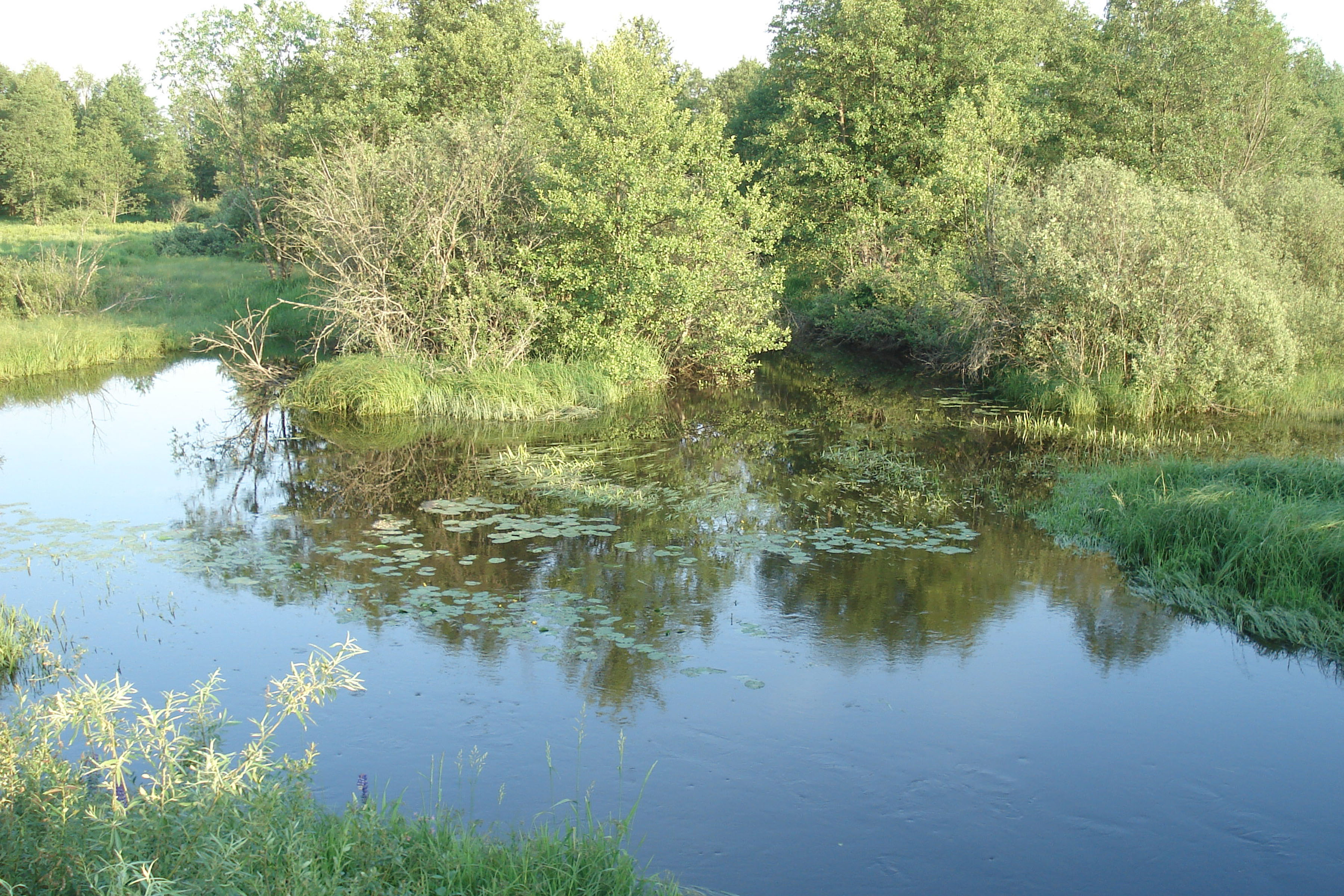
- The Volnaya near the village of Stepanovka, Orekhovo-Zuyevsky District
- Native name: Вольная (Russian)

Location
- Country: Russia

Physical characteristics
- Mouth: Nerskaya
  - coordinates: 55.5881°N 38.9454°E
- Length: 27 km (17 mi)
- Basin size: 143 km^{2} (55 sq mi)

Basin features
- Progression: Nerskaya→ Moskva→ Oka→ Volga→ Caspian Sea

The Volnaya (Russian: Во́льная) is a river in Moscow Oblast, Russia. It is a left tributary of the Nerskaya (Moskva tributary). It is 27 kilometres (17 mi) long, and has a drainage basin of 143 square kilometres (55 sq mi).
