= Georgy Blagonravov =

Soviet politician (1896–1938)

- Георгий Благонравов
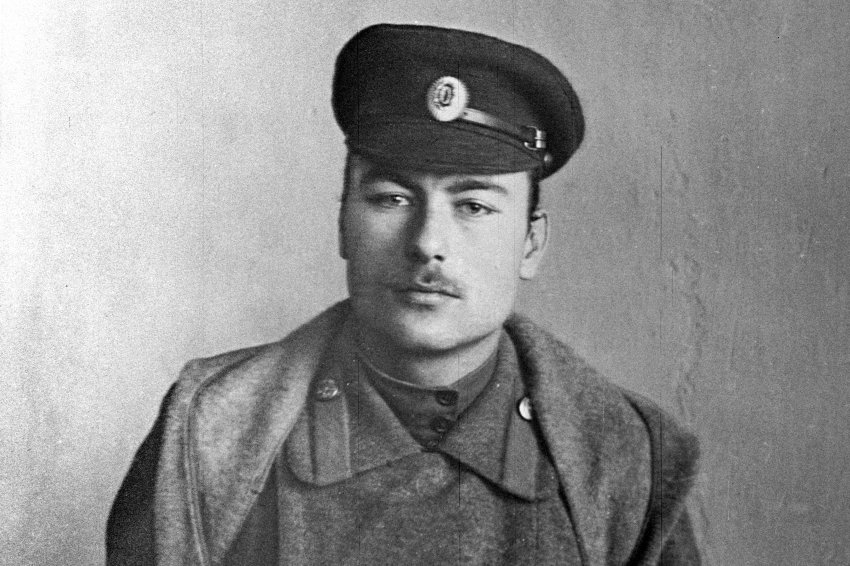
- Blagonravov in 1917

Head of the Central Administration of Highways and Road Transport
- In office 3 August 1935 – 27 March 1936
- Preceded by: Leonid Serebryakov
- Succeeded by: Position abolished

Personal details
- Born: May 18, 1898 Yegoryevsk, Ryazan Governorate, Russian Empire
- Died: June 16, 1938 (aged 40) Kommunarka, Moscow, Russian Soviet Federative Socialist Republic, Soviet Union
- Party: Communist Party of the Soviet Union (1917–1937)
- Awards: Honorary State Security Officer

Military service
- Commands: Petrograd Cheka
- Battles/wars: First World War; Russian Civil War

Georgy Ivanovich Blagonravov (Russian: Георгий Иванович Благонравов; 18 May 1898 – 16 June 1938) was a Russian revolutionary and high-ranking official of the Soviet security apparatus (Cheka, OGPU, NKVD).

== Biography ==
Blagonravov was born into the family of a policeman. From January 1913 to May 1914 he worked as a tutor in Yegoryevsk. He graduated from the Yegoryevsk gymnasium in 1914, and entered Moscow University. As a student at the Faculty of Law of Moscow University, he joined the revolutionary movement.

In May 1915, Blagonravov was drafted into the Imperial Army. After graduating from the Alexander Military School, he served in the 80th reserve infantry regiment in Yegorievsk. In February 1917, he was elected chairman of the regimental committee, joined the Bolsheviks in March, and then became chairman of the Yegoryevsk Soviet of Workers' and Soldiers' Deputies.

At the 1st All-Russian Congress of Soviets, Blagonravov was elected a member of the All-Russian Central Executive Committee, where he worked as secretary of the Bolshevik faction. He was a member of the Military Organization under the Central Committee of the RSDLP(b).

Blagonravov took an active part in the October armed uprising in Petrograd. On 23 October (5 November) 1917, the Petrograd Military Revolutionary Committee appointed him Commissar of the Peter and Paul Fortress, whose guns fired at the Winter Palace on 25 October (7 November). By order of the Military Revolutionary Committee, Blagonravov prepared cells in the Trubetskoy Bastion for the arrested ministers of the Provisional Government. During December, he worked as an extraordinary commissar for the protection of Petrograd. From November to December, he was Commandant of the Peter and Paul Fortress; then, until May 1918, Blagonravov was Extraordinary Commissar for the Protection of Petrograd. He headed the Committee for Combating Pogroms, created on 2 December 1917.

In June and July of 1918, Blagonravov was a member of the Revolutionary Military Council of the Eastern Front, where he participated in the fight against the Czechoslovak Corps and in the suppression of the Yaroslavl rebellion. Then, in November 1918, he worked in the Cheka in various positions and was heavily involved in the Red Terror. From 1921 to 1922, he was head of the transport department of the Cheka, and from February 1922 to October 1931 head of the transport department of the GPU and OGPU. He was a member of the board of the OGPU (26 October 1929 - 7 October 1931).

From December to October 1931, Blagonravov worked as Deputy People's Commissar of Railways. On 7 October 1931, he became second Deputy People's Commissar of Railways of the USSR. On 21 September 1932 he was promoted to 1st Deputy People's Commissar of Railways of the USSR.

At the 17th Congress of the All-Union Communist Party (b) in February 1934, Blagonravov was elected a candidate member of the Central Committee.

On 3 August 1935, he became head of the Central Administration of Highways and Motor Transport under the Council of People's Commissars of the Soviet Union. On 27 March 1936, he took over the Main Directorate for the Construction of Highways of the NKVD and on July 5 of the same year, became Commissar of State Security of the 1st rank.

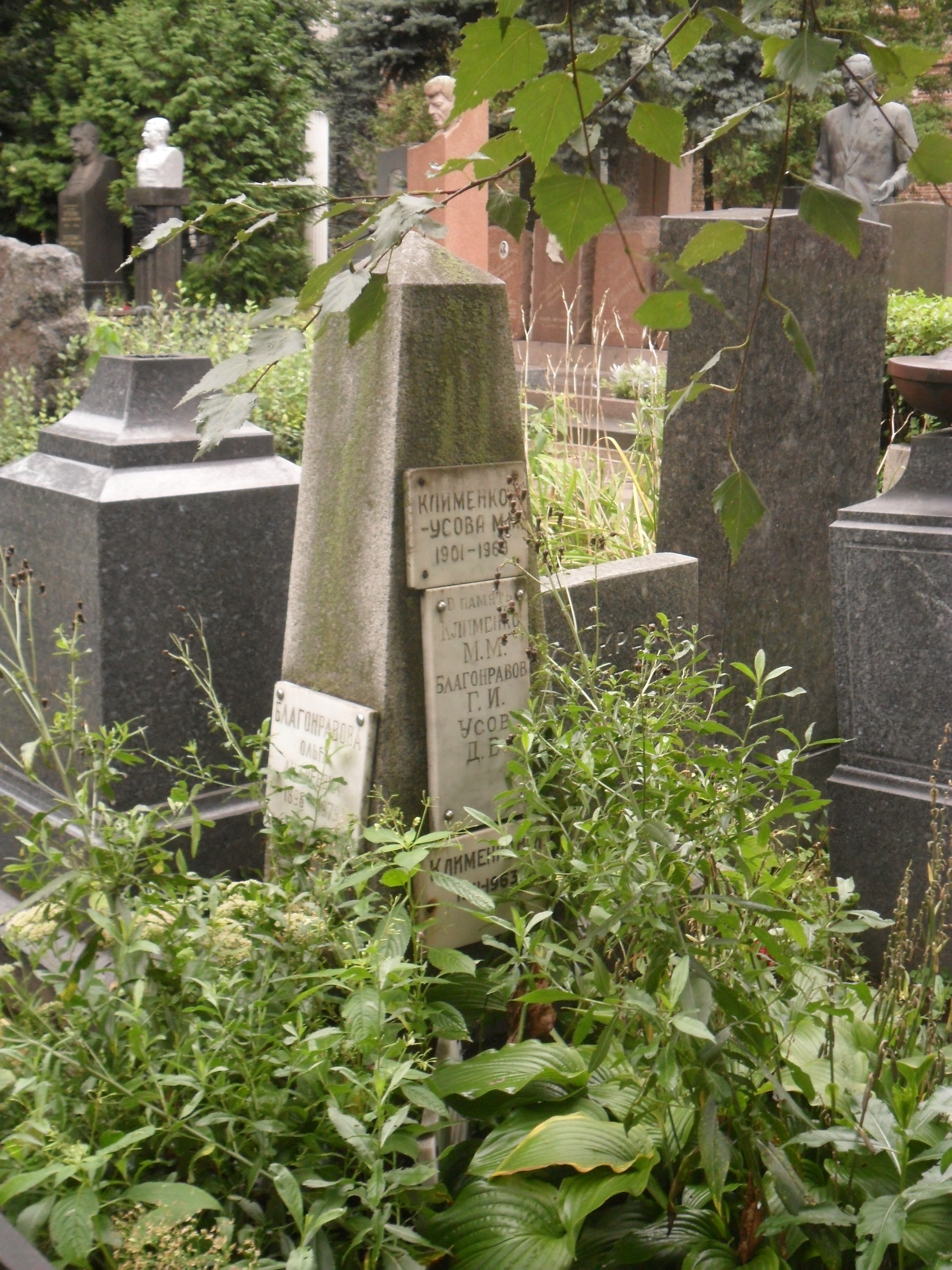
Blagonravov’s cenotaph at Novodevichy Cemetery.

On 25 May 1937, Blagonravov was arrested and on 2 December 1937 convicted of "participation in the anti-Soviet organizations in the NKVD." He was shot on June 16, 1938, together with a group of senior NKVD officers, and was buried at the Kommunarka shooting ground.

Blagonravov was posthumously rehabilitated in 1956 and reinstated in the party the same year.
