= Ponor (Nerskaya) =

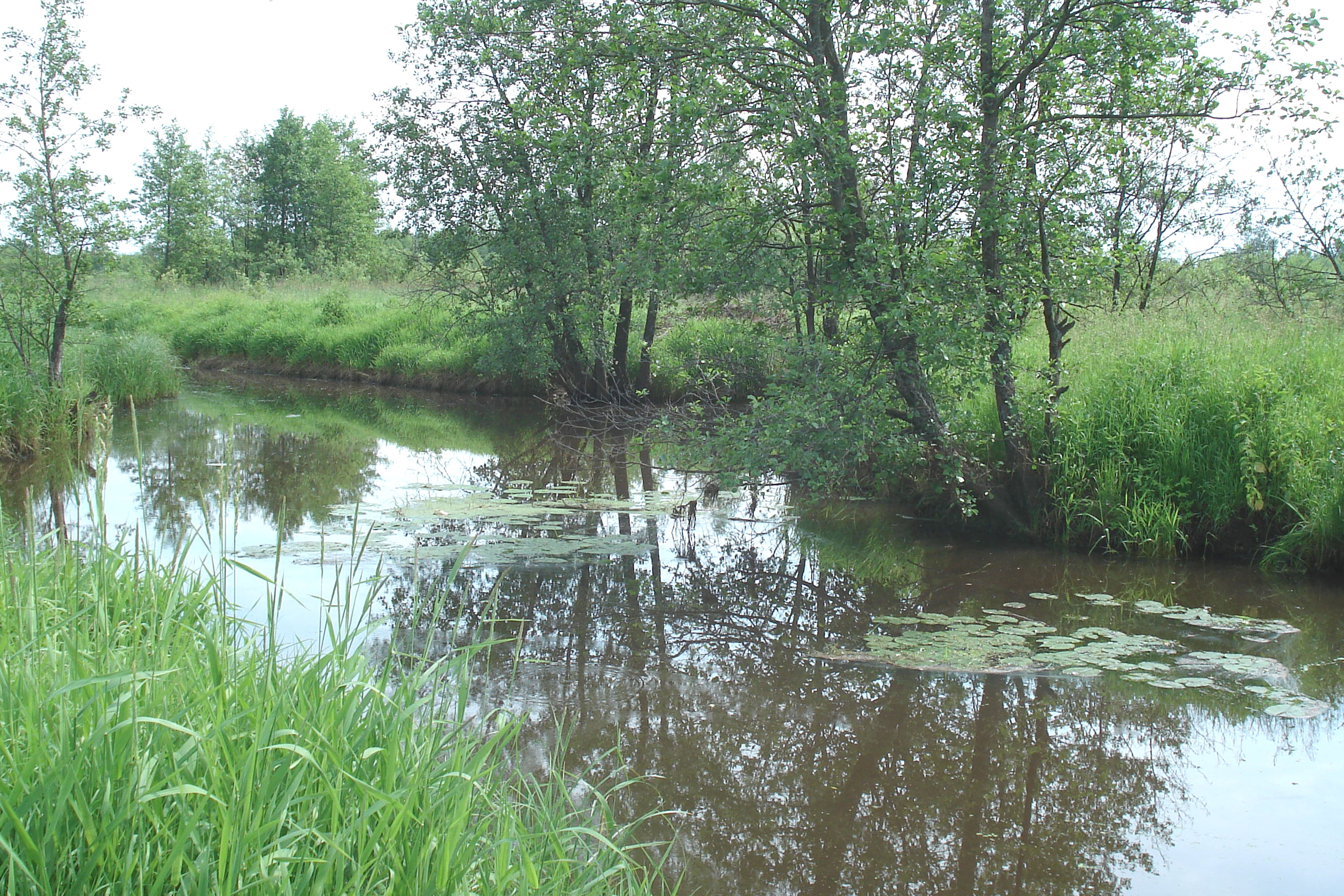
- The Ponor near the village of Zaponorye
- Native name: Понорь (Russian)

Location
- Country: Russia

Physical characteristics
- Mouth: Nerskaya
  - coordinates: 55.6082°N 38.9867°E
- Length: 22 km (14 mi)
- Basin size: 196 km^{2} (76 sq mi)

Basin features
- Progression: Nerskaya→ Moskva→ Oka→ Volga→ Caspian Sea

The Ponor (Russian: Понорь), also known as Ponar (Понaрь) is a river in Moscow Oblast, Russia. It is a right tributary of the Nerskaya (Moskva tributary). It is 22 kilometres (14 mi) long, and has a drainage basin of 196 square kilometres (76 sq mi). The source is 1 km south from the village of Krupino, Moscow oblast. It flows to the east. Ponor runs into Nerskaya on distance of 5 km on the northeast from the town of Kurovskoye.

The country, which the Ponor runs through, is very boggy and, therefore, difficult for hiking. Wood has only about the mouth, near the outfall of the Nerskaya.
