= Guslitsa (river) =

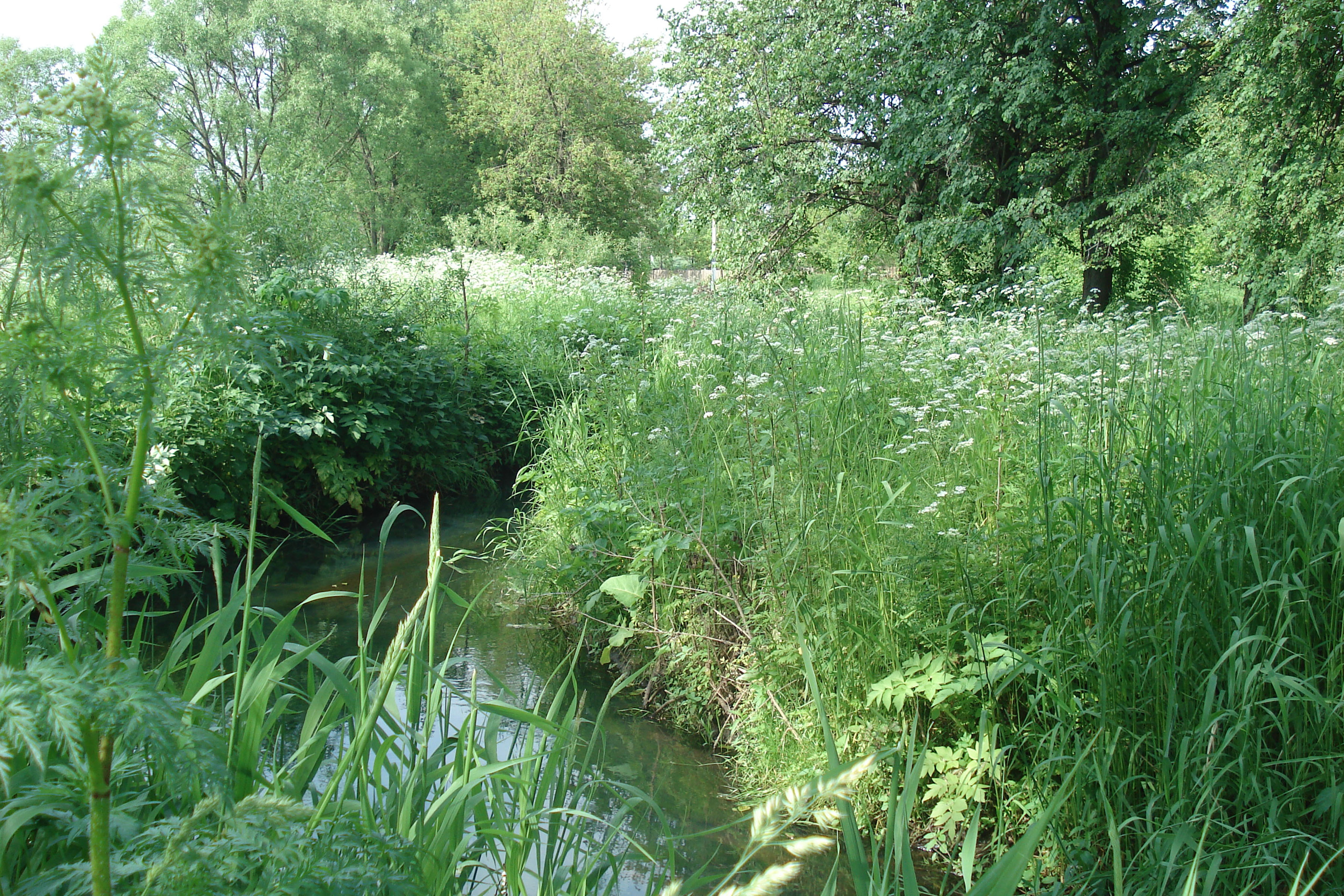
- The river Guslitsa in the city of Yegoryevsk
- Native name: Гуслица (Russian)

Location
- Country: Russia

Physical characteristics
- Mouth: Nerskaya
  - coordinates: 55.5053°N 38.7926°E
- Length: 36 km (22 mi)
- Basin size: 368 km^{2} (142 sq mi)

Basin features
- Progression: Nerskaya→ Moskva→ Oka→ Volga→ Caspian Sea

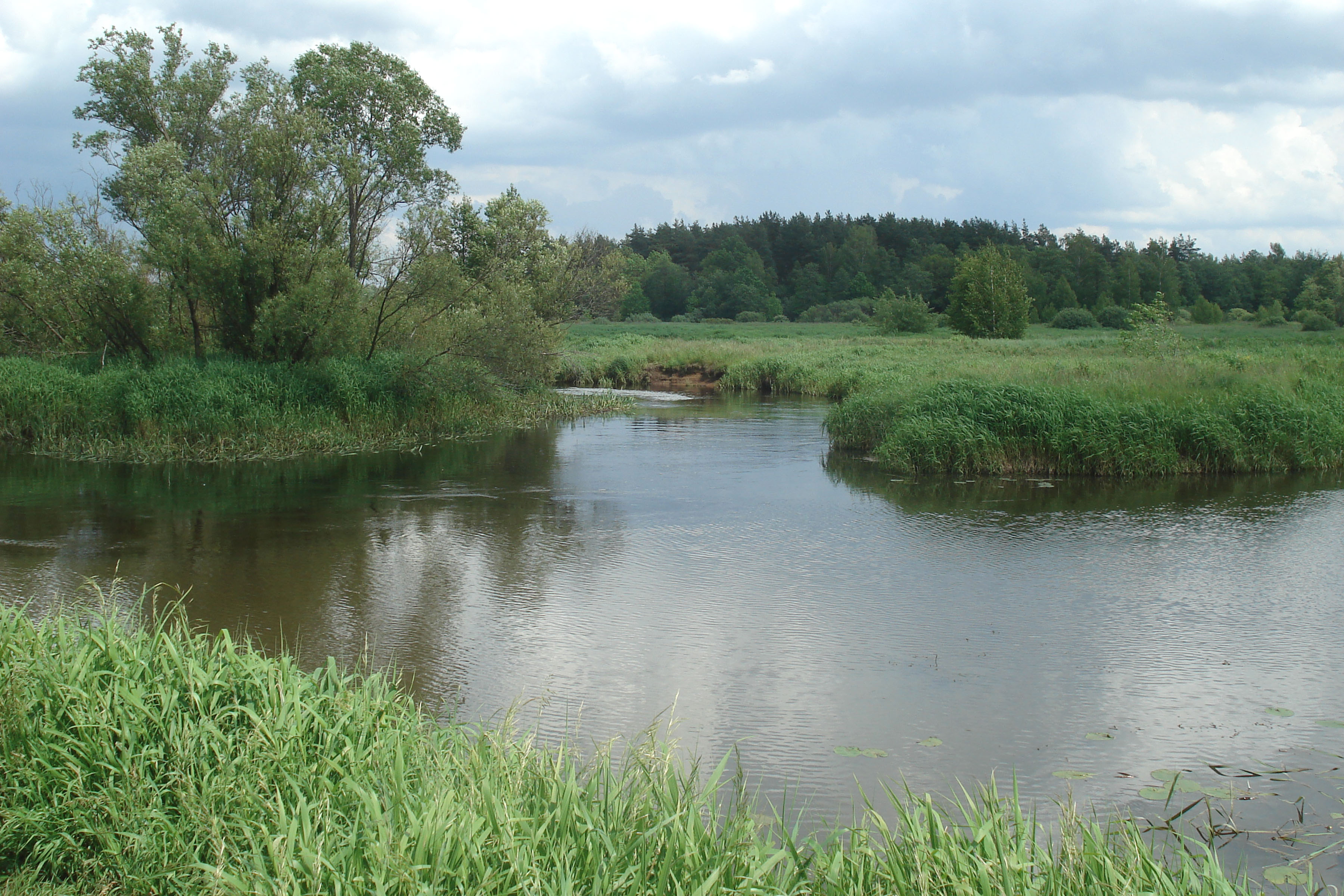
The confluence of the rivers Guslitsa (on the right) and Nerskaya (ahead and on the left) near the village of Khoteichi

The Guslitsa (Russian: Гу́слица), also known as Guslyanka (Гусля́нка) is a river in Moscow Oblast, Russia. It is a left tributary of the Nerskaya (Moskva tributary). It is 36 kilometres (22 mi) long, and has a drainage basin of 368 square kilometres (142 sq mi). Source near the city of Yegoryevsk. Flows all over again on the North, and then on the West, running in the Nerskaya at the village Khoteichi. The upper reaches of the Guslitsa River up to village Ilyinsky Pogost are densely populated and almost without forest. The river has flat type. A feed mainly snow. Guslitsa freezes in November — the beginning of December, it is opened in the end of March — April.

Main tributaries: Desna, Shuvoyka, Silenka.

The city of Yegoryevsk and the villages of Ilyinsky Pogost and Slobodishche are situated on the Guslitsa River.

The river Guslitsa gave its name to the historical area Guslitsa.
