= Yegoryevsk =

Town in Moscow Oblast, Russia

Yegoryevsk Егорьевск
- Town
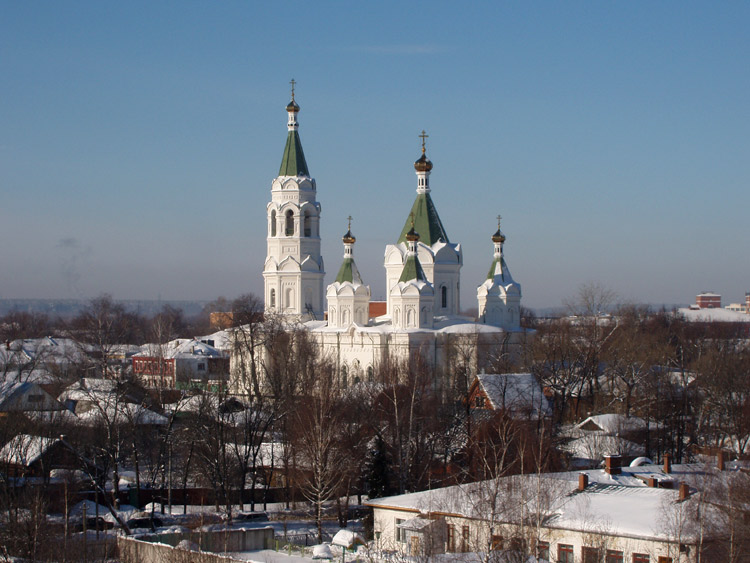
- Alexander Nevsky Church

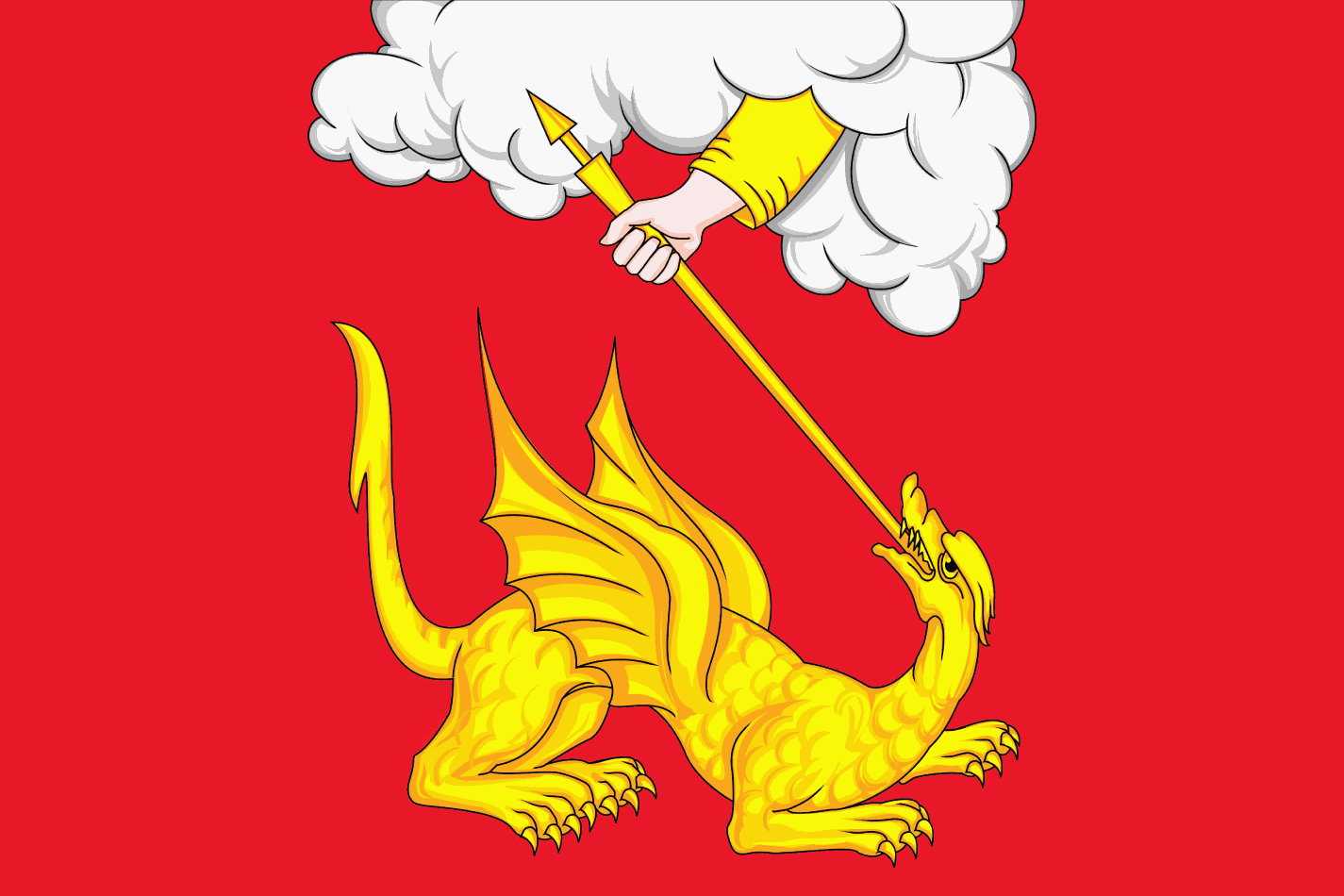
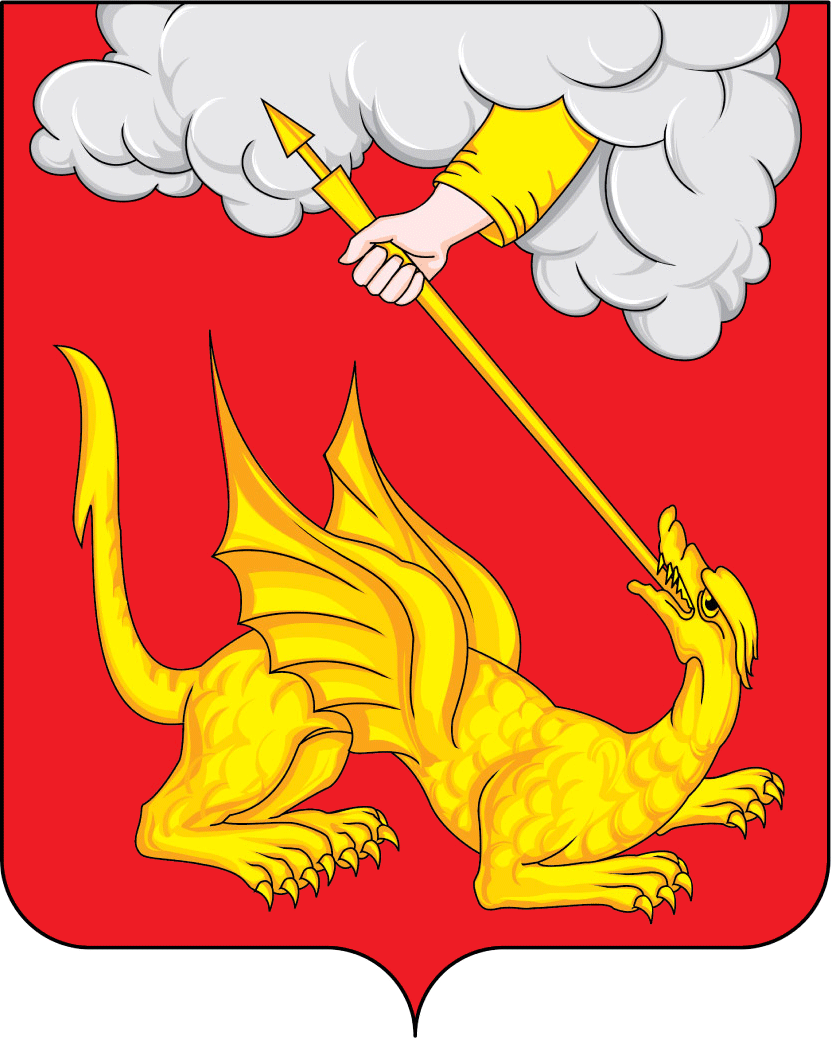
- Flag Coat of arms
- Interactive map of Yegoryevsk
- Location of Yegoryevsk Yegoryevsk (Moscow Oblast)
- Coordinates: 55°23′N 39°03′E
- Country: Russia
- Federal subject: Moscow Oblast
- Administrative district: Yegoryevsky District
- TownSelsoviet: Yegoryevsk
- Known since: 1462
- Town status since: 1778
- Elevation: 150 m (490 ft)

Population (2010 Census)
  - Total: 70,081
  - Estimate (2025): 71,169 (+1.6%)
  - Rank: 226th in 2010

Administrative status
  - Capital of: Yegoryevsky District, Town of Yegoryevsk

Municipal status
  - Municipal district: Yegoryevsky Municipal District
  - Urban settlement: Yegoryevsk Urban Settlement
  - Capital of: Yegoryevsky Municipal District, Yegoryevsk Urban Settlement
- Time zone: UTC+3 (MSK)
- Postal codes: 140300–140306, 140308
- OKTMO ID: 46522000001

Yegoryevsk (Russian: Его́рьевск) is a town and the administrative center of Yegoryevsk Urban Settlement in Moscow Oblast, Russia, located on the bank of the Guslitsa River 114 kilometers (71 mi) southeast of Moscow.

== Toponymy ==
Yegoryevsk was named in honor of St. Egor (Saint George).

== History ==
When it was founded in 1462, it was known as the village of Vysokoye (Высо́кое). It was granted town status in 1778. The new town was quite small with a population of only 280 males and 295 females, mostly consisting of merchants and burgesses.

Yegoryevsk was famous for its annual fairs, where bread was mainly sold. In the 19th century, Yegoryevsk became a center of the Russian textile industry. The Khludov brothers cotton factory has been in operation since 1845 - it has survived to this day and its clocktowers are one of the main sights of the town. A lot of the town's development happened from 1872 to 1901, under the mayor N. M. Bardygin. At his order, the Moscow architect I. T. Baryutin built the Egoryevsk Mechanical and Electrical Engineering School named after Tsarevich Alexei, and the Holy Trinity Mariinsky Convent was rebuilt.

Yegoryevsk is also an important center of Old Believers.

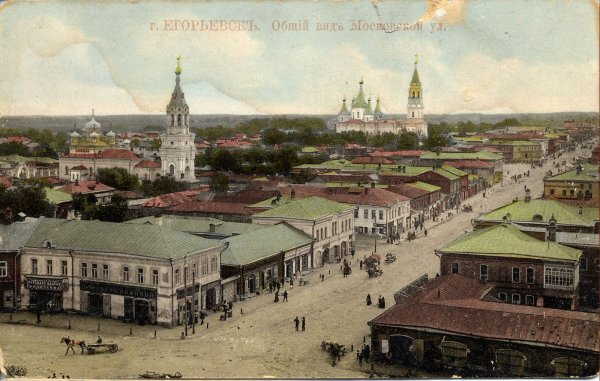
General view of Moscow street at the beginning of the 20th century

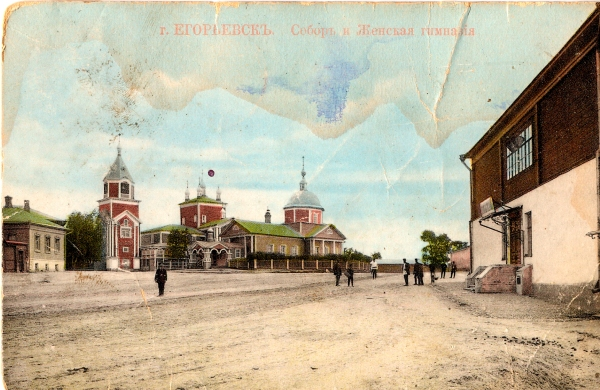
Kazan Church and the Red Cathedral (St. George)

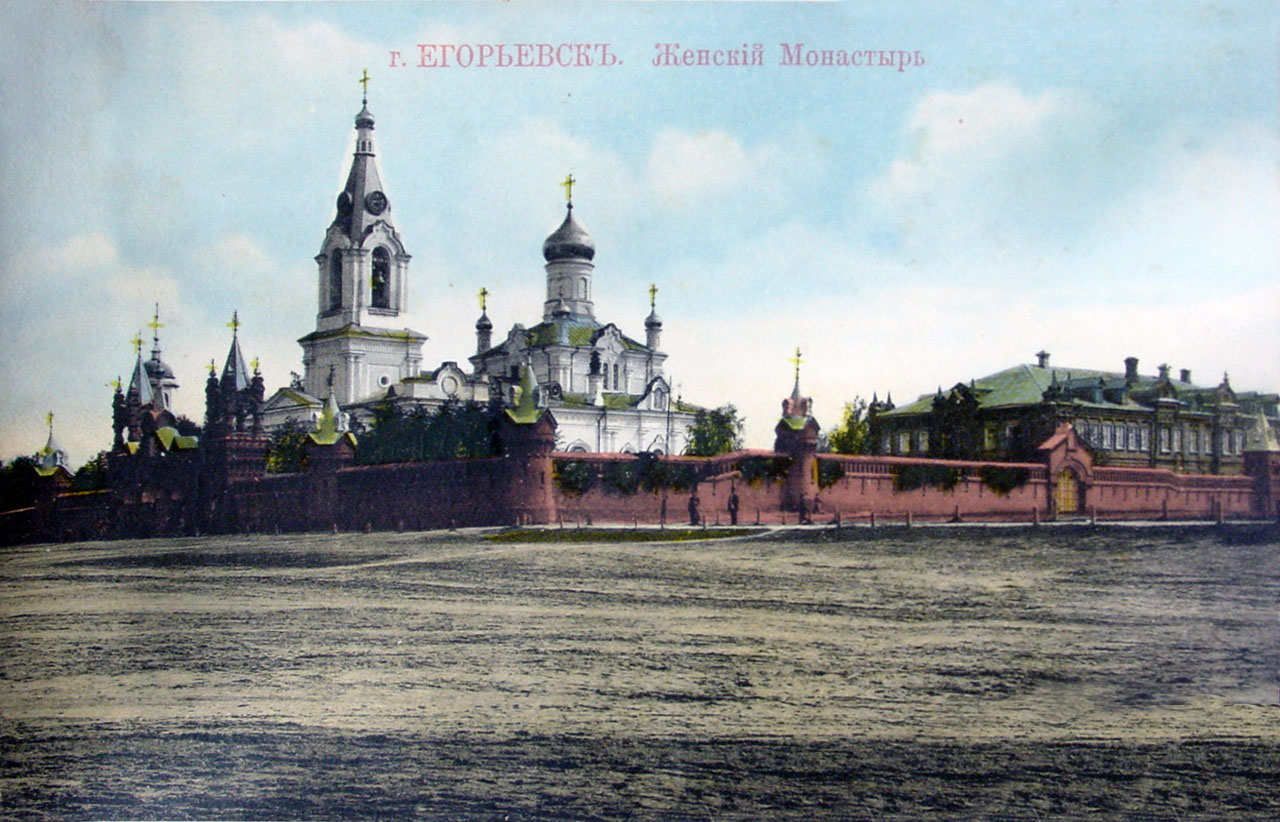
Holy Trinity maiden Mariinsky monastery

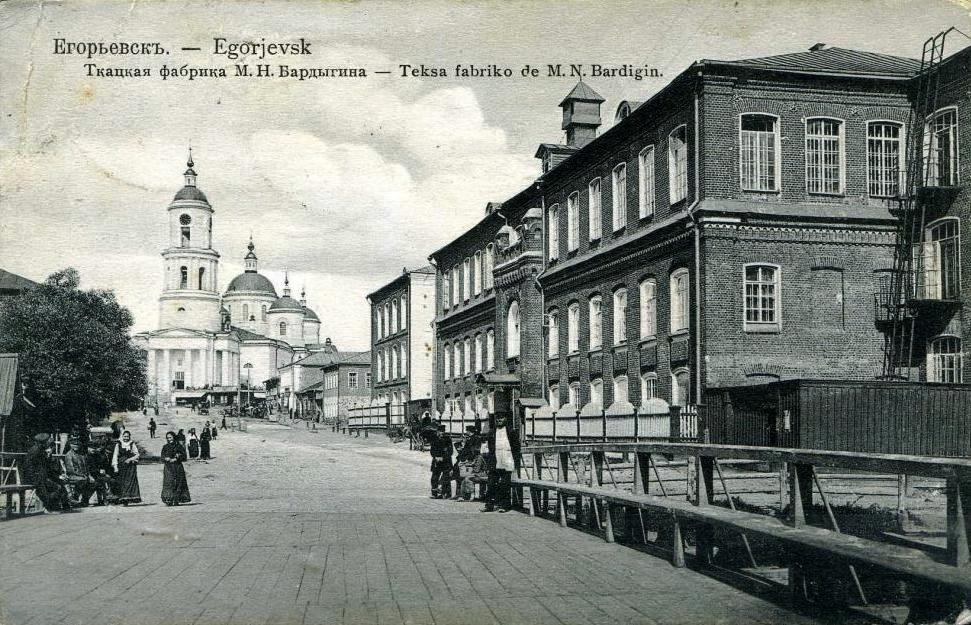
Weaving factory M. N. Bardygin

== Administrative and municipal status ==
Within the framework of administrative divisions, Yegoryevsk serves as the administrative center of Yegoryevsky District. As an administrative division, it is, together with sixty-two rural localities, incorporated within Yegoryevsky District as the Town of Yegoryevsk. As a municipal division, the Town of Yegoryevsk is incorporated within Yegoryevsky Municipal District as Yegoryevsk Urban Settlement.

== Culture ==
The town is home to many historic buildings from the 18th and 19th centuries, as well as a museum with both art and artifacts of daily life in earlier centuries.

== Military ==
Yegoryevsk was home to the 924th Center of Combat Application for UAVs, prior to the center being reincorporated in Kolomna as the 1327th UAV Combat Training Center in 2009.

== Notable people ==
- Georgy Blagonravov (1898-1938), Russian revolutionary and high-ranking official of the Soviet security apparatus (Cheka, OGPU, NKVD)
- Elena Gogoleva (1900-1993), Soviet and Russian film and stage actress, actress of the Maly Theatre, People's Artist of the USSR
- Igor Grabar (1871-1960), Russian Post-Impressionist painter, publisher, restorer and historian of art
- Maria Gurova (born 1989), Russian retired freestyle wrestler
- Alexandra Jacobi (1841-1918), Russian journalist, memoirist and publicist, translator and publisher
- Vasili Kartsev (1920-1987), Soviet professional football player and coach
- Valeria Koblova (born 1992), Russian retired freestyle wrestler
- Pierre Narcisse (1977-2022), Cameroonian-born Russian singer
- Aliya Mustafina (born 1994), retired Olympic gymnast
- Vadim Romanov (born 1978), Russian professional football player and coach
- Zinaida Samsonova (1924-1944), senior medical service sergeant, posthumously awarded the title of Hero of the Soviet Union
- Eduard Uspensky (1937-2018), Soviet and Russian children's writer and poet

== Twin towns and sister cities ==
Yegoryevsk is twinned with:

- Pirdop, Bulgaria
- Mazyr, Belarus
- Zhuji, China
- Zghurivka, Ukraine
