= Ilyinsky Pogost =

Rural locality in Moscow Oblast, Russia

Coordinates: 55°28.3′N 38°54.1′E

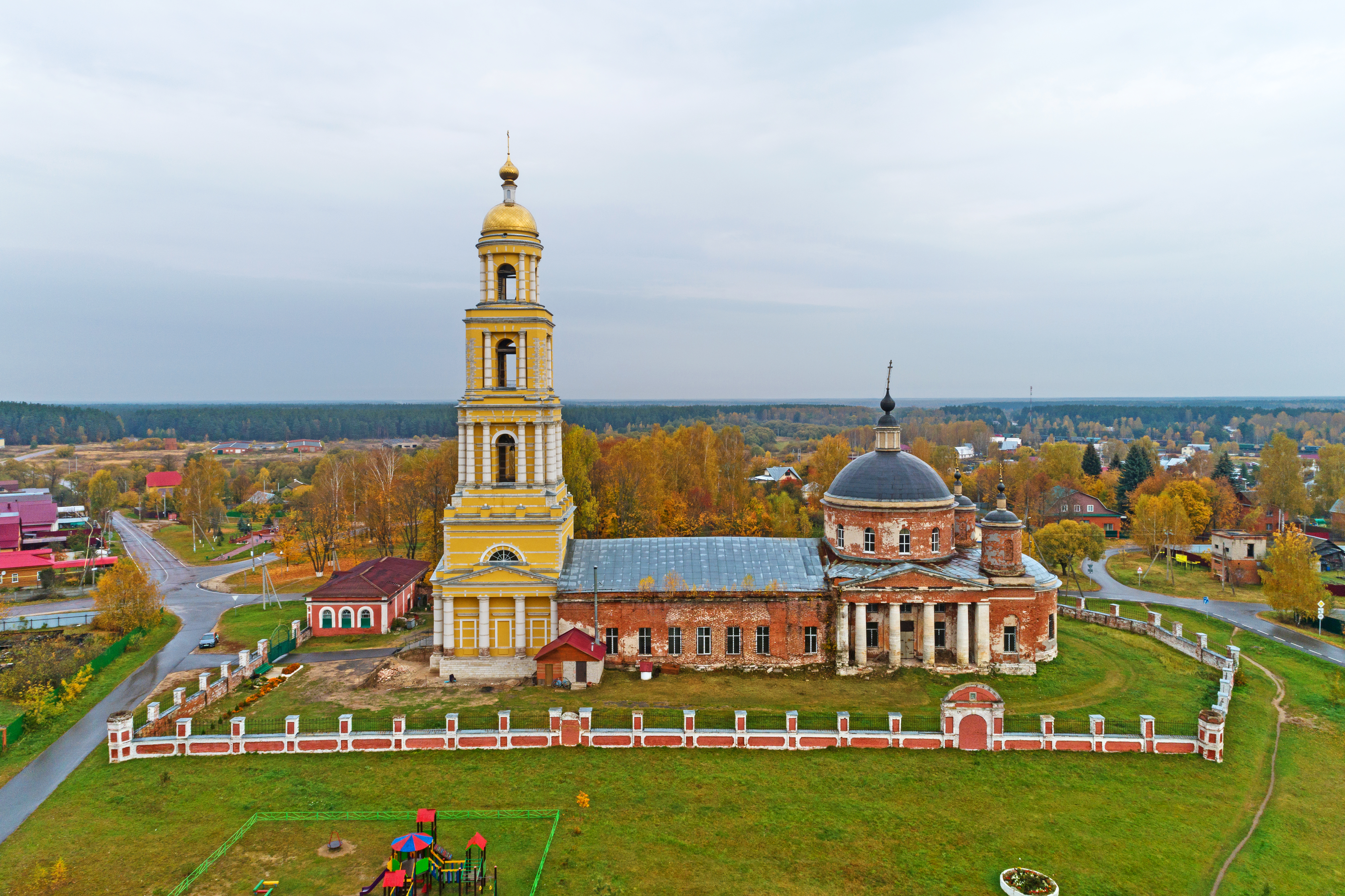
Ilyinsky Pogost. Resurrection of Jesus Church

Ilyinsky Pogost (Russian: Ильи́нский Пого́ст) is a village (selo) in Orekhovo-Zuyevsky District of Moscow Oblast, Russia, located on the Guslitsa River (Nerskaya's tributary). In the past, it was named Guslitsa (Гу́слица) and Pogost na Guslitse (Пого́ст на Гу́слице).

Ilyinsky Pogost is the administrative center of Ilynskoye Rural Settlement, the population of which was 4,000 as of the 2002 Census. The postal code of the village is 142651.

Ilyinsky Pogost was first mentioned in 1585 and later served as the center of the historical area of Guslitsa (Guslitskaya volost).

A large Resurrection of Jesus church (of the Moscow Patriarchate) is located in Ilyinsky Pogost. The church was built in 1822 and consecrated in 1840. In 1849, the construction of a belltower over 70 meters (230 ft) in height was finished. In 1937, the church was closed, and its building was used to house a sewing workshop between 1940 and 1953. In 1953, the building was turned into a warehouse used by the village's collective farm, and was used for this purpose until 1961. In 1961–1990 it housed a tare shop. During the German-Soviet War the belltower was used as an observation post. On March 25, 1990 the church was returned to the local community of believers.
