= Yegoryevsky District, Moscow Oblast =

Yegoryevsky District Егорьевский район (Russian)
- District
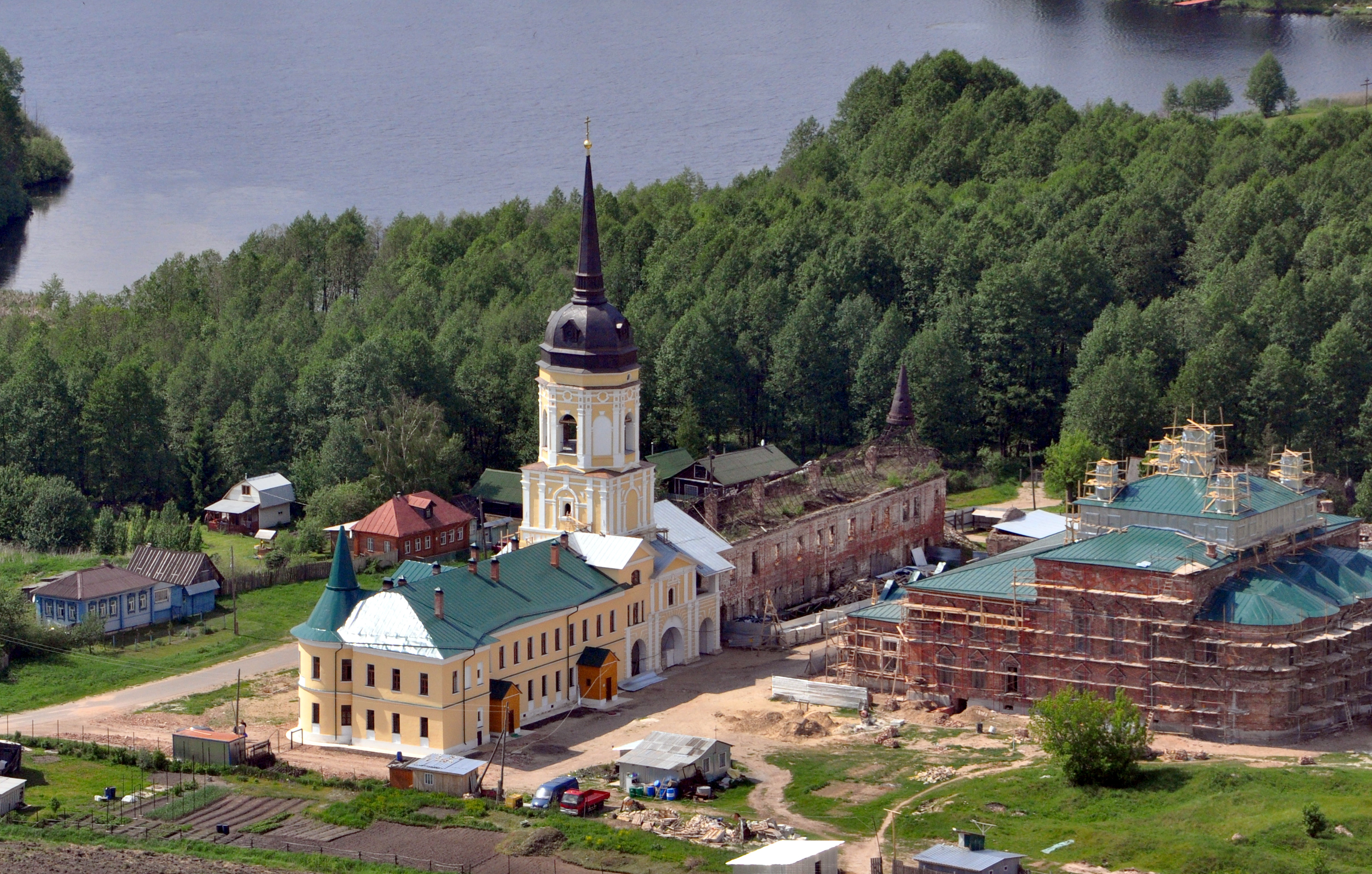
- Nicholas-Radovitsky Monastery, Yegoryevsky District

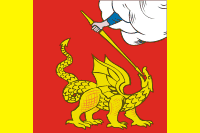
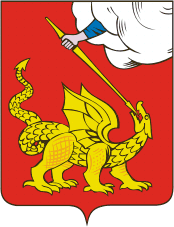
- Flag Coat of arms
- Location of Yegoryevsky District in Moscow Oblast (before July 2012)
- Coordinates: 55°23′N 39°02′E
- Country: Russia
- Federal subject: Moscow Oblast
- Established: 7 November 2015
- Administrative center: Yegoryevsk

Area
  - Total: 1,717.06 km^{2} (662.96 sq mi)

Population (2010 Census)
  - Total: 102,958
  - Density: 59.9618/km^{2} (155.300/sq mi)
  - Urban: 70.1%
  - Rural: 29.9%

Administrative structure
  - Administrative divisions: 1 Towns, 1 Work settlements, 3 Rural settlements
  - Inhabited localities: 1 cities/towns, 1 urban-type settlements, 198 rural localities

Municipal structure
  - Municipally incorporated as: Yegoryevsky Municipal District
  - Municipal divisions: 2 urban settlements, 3 rural settlements
- Time zone: UTC+3 (MSK)
- OKTMO ID: 46722000
- Website: http://www.egoradmin.ru/

Yegoryevsky District (Russian: Его́рьевский райо́н) is an administrative and municipal district (raion), one of the thirty-six in Moscow Oblast, Russia. It is located in the east of the oblast. The area of the district is 1,717.06 square kilometers (662.96 sq mi). Its administrative center is the town of Yegoryevsk. Population: 102,958 (2010 Census); 98,063 (2002 census); 32,229 (1989 Soviet census). The population of Yegoryevsk accounts for 68.1% of the district's total population.
