= Guslitsa =

Region in Moscow Oblast, Russia

Coordinates: 55°28.3′N 38°54.1′E

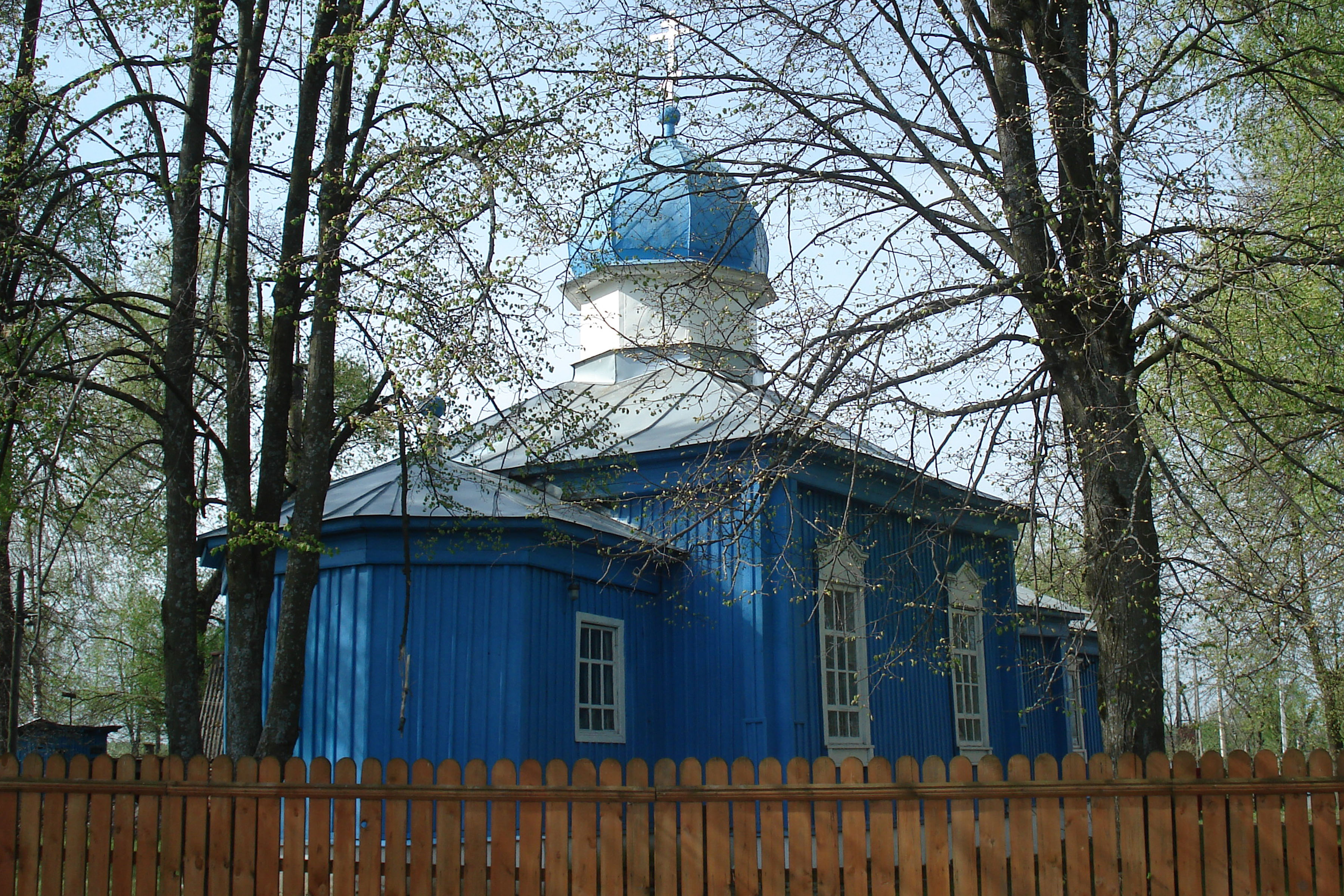
Shuvoye, Guslitsa, Moscow region. Old-Believers (Russian Orthodox Old-Rite Church) Trinity Church

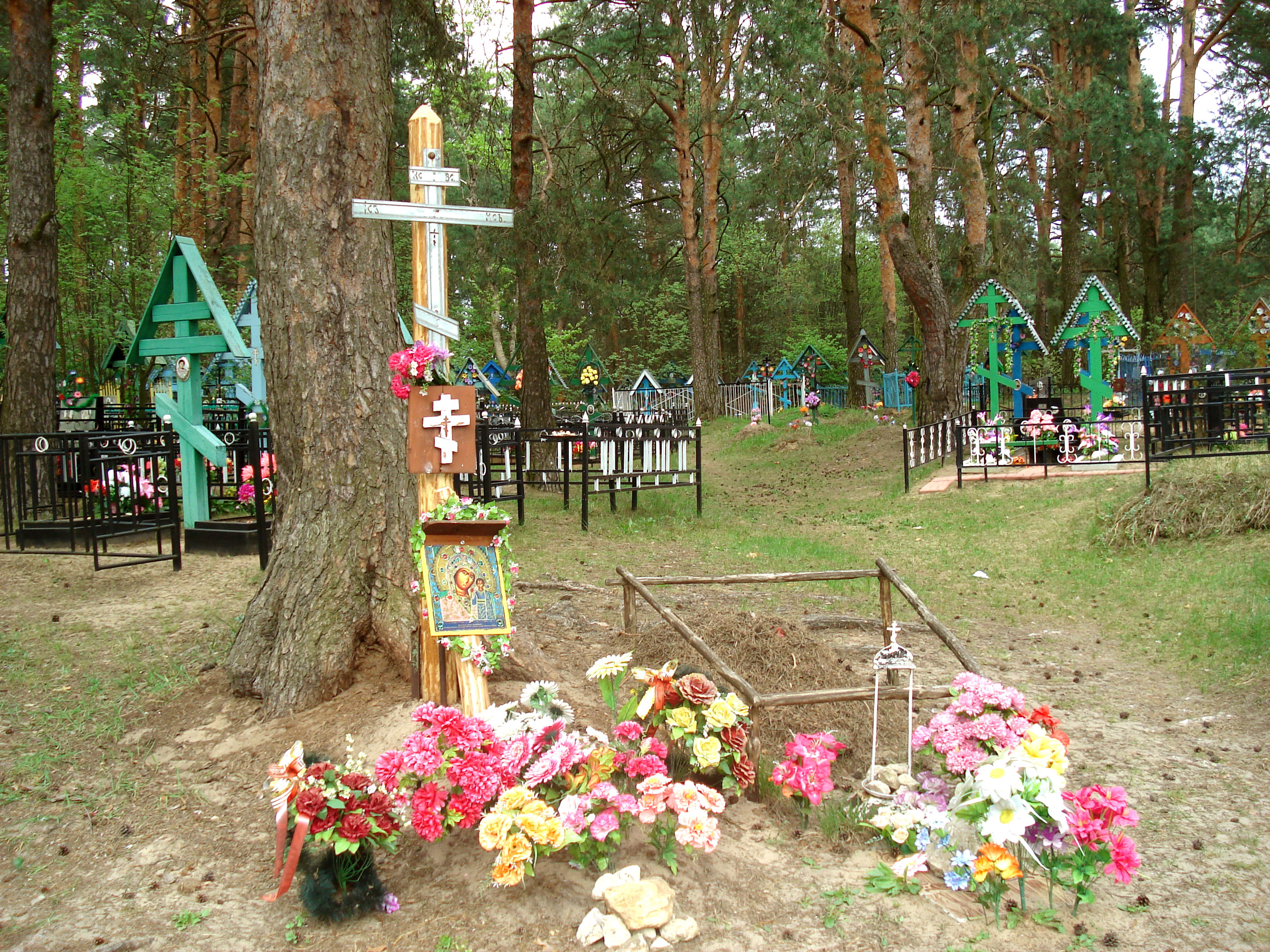
Сemetery in Belivo, Guslitsa, Moscow region

Guslitsa, Guslica, or Guslicy (Russian: Гу́слица, Гу́слицы) is a region situated in the eastern part of Moscow Oblast. Guslitsa is famous for it was almost entirely inhabited by the Old Believers, mainly popovtsy (Belokrinitskaya Hierarchy, now — Russian Orthodox Old-Rite Church). Name Guslitsa occurs from the Guslitsa River.

Guslitsa is also well known for its cultural heritage and its home-crafts, mainly hand-written singing books and copper mouldings. Guslitsa has its center in the Rudnya and Ilyinsky Pogost villages.

Nowadays Guslitsa lies almost entirely within Orekhovo-Zuyevsky District of Moscow Oblast.

The regions neighboring Guslitsa (currently also unofficial) were also mainly inhabited by the old believers and were influenced by the Guslitsa culture a lot. Among them are: Ramenye, Zakhod, Zaponorye, Patriarshina, Vokhna.
