= Nerskaya =

River in Moscow Oblast, Russia

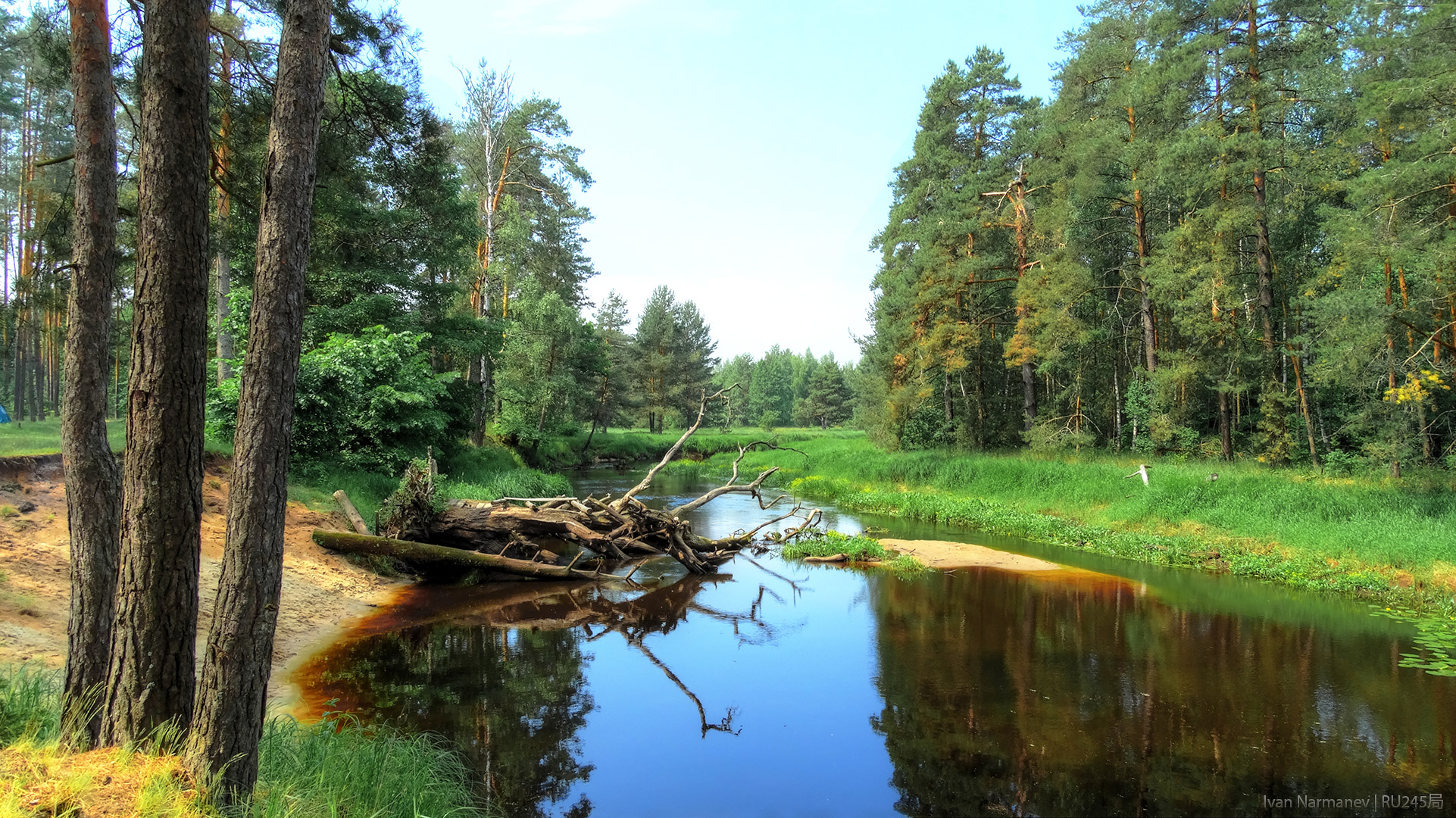
- Nerskaya river near Kurovskoye city
- Native name: Нерская (Russian)

Location
- Country: Russia

Physical characteristics
- Mouth: Moskva
  - coordinates: 55.3559°N 38.6015°E
- Length: 92 km (57 mi)
- Basin size: 1,510 km^{2} (580 sq mi)

Basin features
- Progression: Moskva→ Oka→ Volga→ Caspian Sea

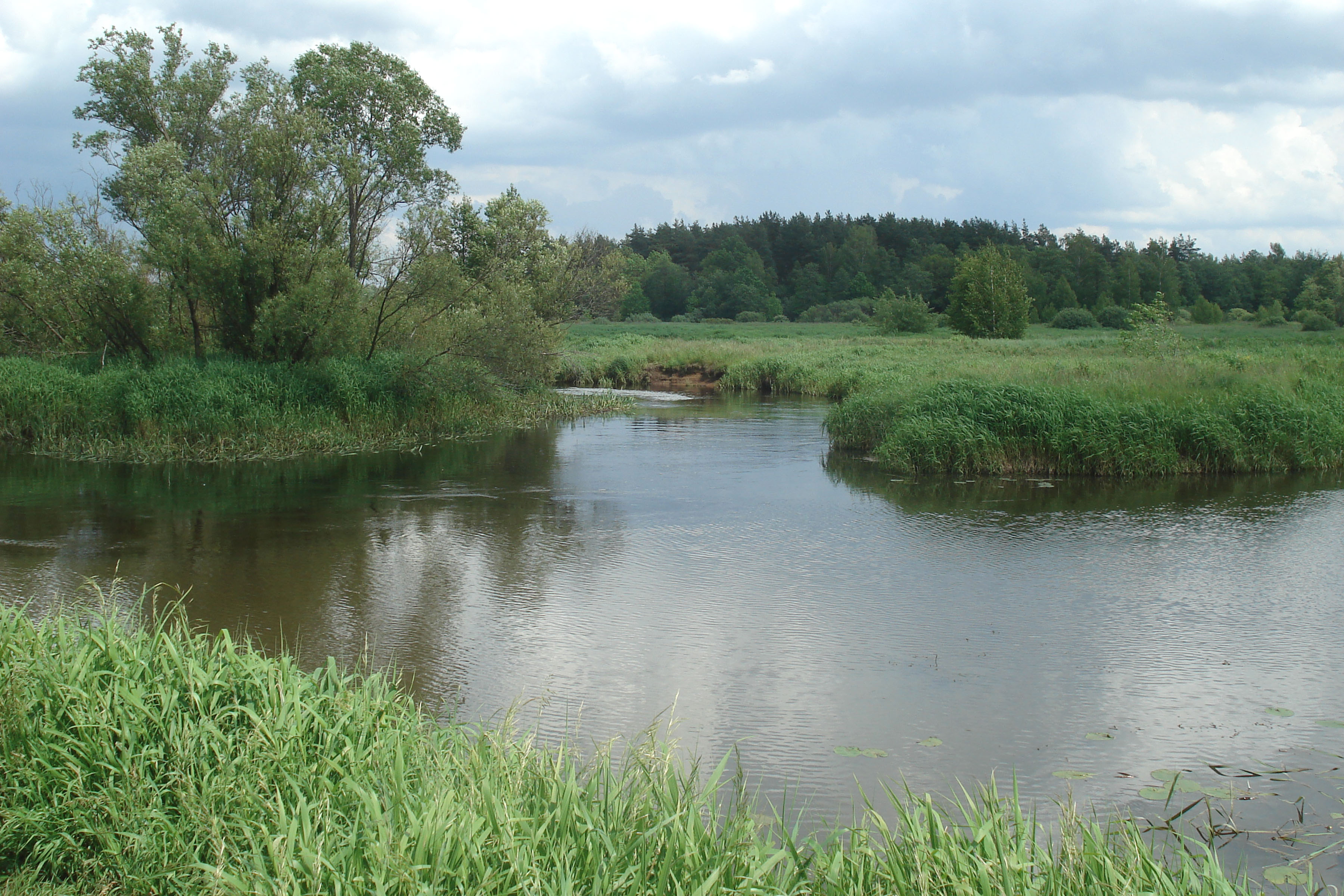
Place of a confluence of the river Guslitsa (on the right) in the Nerskaya (ahead and on the left) near at the village of Khoteichi

The Nerskaya (Russian: Не́рская) is a river in Moscow Oblast, Russia. It is a left tributary of the Moskva. It is 92 km in length, with a drainage basin of 1,510 km². Its average discharge is 8.3 m³/s.

The town of Kurovskoye is on the Nerskaya.

Ponor, Volnaya, Guslitsa, Sechenka and Sushenka are tributaries of the Nerskaya.
