= Orekhovo-Zuyevsky District =

Orekhovo-Zuyevsky District Орехово-Зуевский район (Russian)
- District
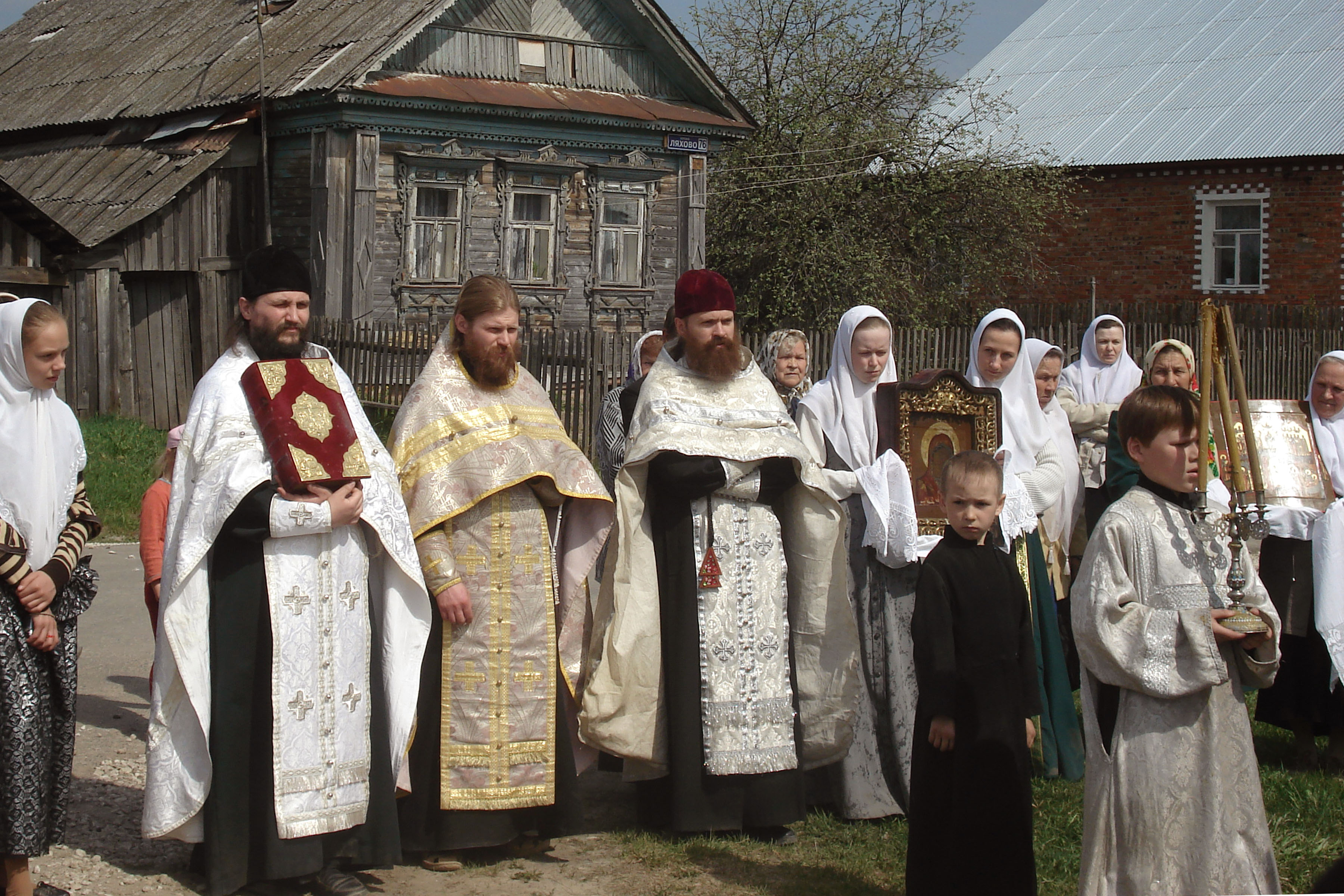
- Old-Rite Russian Orthodox clergy, Lyakhovo, Orekhovo-Zuyevsky District

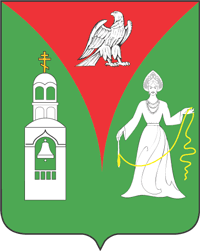
- Flag Coat of arms
- Location of Orekhovo-Zuyevsky District in Moscow Oblast (before July 2012)
- Coordinates: 55°49′N 38°59′E
- Country: Russia
- Federal subject: Moscow Oblast
- Established: 1093 (Julian)
- Administrative center: Orekhovo-Zuyevo

Area
  - Total: 1,821.28 km^{2} (703.20 sq mi)

Population (2010 Census)
  - Total: 121,916
  - Density: 66.9397/km^{2} (173.373/sq mi)
  - Urban: 53.3%
  - Rural: 46.7%

Administrative structure
  - Administrative divisions: 3 Towns, 10 Rural settlements
  - Inhabited localities: 3 cities/towns, 174 rural localities

Municipal structure
  - Municipally incorporated as: Orekhovo-Zuyevsky Municipal District
  - Municipal divisions: 3 urban settlements, 10 rural settlements
- Time zone: UTC+3 (MSK)
- OKTMO ID: 46643000
- Website: http://www.oz-rayon.ru/

Orekhovo-Zuyevsky District (Russian: Оре́хово-Зу́евский райо́н) is an administrative and municipal district (raion), one of the thirty-six in Moscow Oblast, Russia. It is located in the east of the oblast. The area of the district is 1,821.28 square kilometers (703.20 sq mi). Its administrative center is the city of Orekhovo-Zuyevo (which is not administratively a part of the district). Population: 121,916 (2010 Census); 119,803 (2002 census); 132,446 (1989 Soviet census).

== Geography ==
The landscape of the district is mostly a hilly plain with average altitude of about 130 meters (430 ft) above sea level. Climate, flora, and fauna are common for Meshchera Lowlands. Main rivers include the Klyazma River with its tributaries the Vyrka, the Senga, and the Bolshaya Dubna. The district has significant peat reserves.

== Administrative and municipal status ==
Within the framework of administrative divisions, Orekhovo-Zuyevsky District is one of the thirty-six in the oblast. The city of Orekhovo-Zuyevo serves as its administrative center, despite being incorporated separately as a city under oblast jurisdiction—an administrative unit with the status equal to that of the districts.

As a municipal division, the district is incorporated as Orekhovo-Zuyevsky Municipal District. Orekhovo-Zuyevo City Under Oblast Jurisdiction is incorporated separately from the district as Orekhovo-Zuyevo Urban Okrug.

== Notable people ==
- Vasily Arkhipov
- Cornelius Titov
