= List of rural localities in Moscow Oblast =

Map of Russia with Moscow Oblast highlighted

This is a list of rural localities in Moscow Oblast. Moscow Oblast (Russian: Моско́вская о́бласть, romanized: Moskovskaya oblast, IPA: [mɐˈskofskəjə ˈobləsʲtʲ]), or Podmoskovye (Russian: Подмоско́вье, IPA: [pədmɐˈskovʲjə], literally "around/near Moscow"), is a federal subject of Russia (an oblast). With a population of 7,095,120 (2010 Census) living in an area of 44,300 square kilometers (17,100 sq mi), it is one of the most densely populated regions in the country and is the second most populous federal subject. The oblast has no official administrative center; its public authorities are located in Moscow and across other locations in the oblast.

== Chekhovsky District ==
Rural localities in Chekhovsky District:

- Chepelyovo

== Dmitrovsky District ==
Rural localities in Dmitrovsky District:

- Abramtsevo
- Abramtsevo

== Dmitrovsky District ==
Rural localities in Dmitrovsky District:

- 3rd Uchastok
- 4th Uchastok
- Novosinkovo
- Paramonovo
- Rogachevo

== Domodedovsky District ==
Rural localities in Domodedovsky District:

- Avdotyino
- Lyamtsino

== Istrinsky District ==
Rural localities in Istrinsky District:

- Alyokhnovo

== Krasnogorsky District ==
Rural localities in Krasnogorsky District:

- Petrovo-Dalneye

== Leninsky District ==
Rural localities in Leninsky District:

- Razvilka

== Lotoshinsky District ==
Rural localities in Lotoshinsky District:

- Abushkovo

== Lukhovitsky District ==
Rural localities in Lukhovitsky District:

- Dedinovo

== Mozhaysky District ==
Rural localities in Mozhaysky District:

- Avdotyino

== Mozhaysky District ==
Rural localities in Mozhaysky District:

- Borodino

== Mytishchinsky District ==
Rural localities in Mytishchinsky District:

- Abbakumovo
- Laryovo
- Marfino
- Trudovaya

== Noginsky District ==
Rural localities in Noginsky District:

- 2nd Biserovskiy uchastok
- Aborino
- Avdotyino

== Odintsovsky District ==
Rural localities in Odintsovsky District:

- Barvikha
- Barvikha
- Butyn
- Posyolok abonentnogo yaschika 001
- Skolkovo
- SNT Gradostroitel'
- Zhavoronki

== Orekhovo-Zuyevsky District ==
Rural localities in Orekhovo-Zuyevsky District:

- Abramovka
- Antsiferovo
- Barskoye
- Davydovo
- Gora
- Gubino
- Ilyinsky Pogost
- Khoteichi
- Kostino
- Lyakhovo
- Settlement on the 1st of May
- Slobodishche
- Ustyanovo
- Yelizarovo
- Zaponorye

== Pushkinsky District ==
Rural localities in Pushkinsky District:

- Muranovo

== Ramensky District ==
Rural localities in Ramensky District:

- Gzhel
- Gzhelskogo kirpichnogo zavoda
- Myachkovo
- Verkhneye Myachkovo
- Zyuzino

== Selyatino ==
Rural localities in Selyatino:

- Alabino

== Sergiyevo-Posadsky District ==
Rural localities in Sergiyevo-Posadsky District:

- Abramovo
- Abramtsevo
- Buzhaninovo
- Gagino
- Radonezh

== Shakhovskoy District ==
Rural localities in Shakhovskoy District:

- Maloe Krutoe

== Shatura ==
Rural localities in Shatura:

- Bakhscheevo

== Shatursky District ==
Rural localities in Shatursky District:

- 12 posyolok
- 18 posyolok
- 19 posyolok
- 21 posyolok

== Shchyolkovsky District ==
Rural localities in Shchyolkovsky District:

- Grebnevo

== Solnechnogorsky District ==
Rural localities in Solnechnogorsky District:

- 2nd Smirnovka
- 5th Gorki
- Lyalovo

== Stupinsky District ==
Rural localities in Stupinsky District:

- 2nd Pyatiletka
- Avdotyino
- Avdotyino
- Avdulovo-1
- Avdulovo-2

== Volokolamsky District ==
Rural localities in Volokolamsky District:

- Avdotyino
- Yaropolets

== Yegoryevsky District ==
Rural localities in Yegoryevsky District:

- Gridino

== Yegoryevsky District ==
Rural localities in Yegoryevsky District:

- Abryutkovo
- Alyoshino
- Kolionovo
- Shuvoye

== Zaraysky District ==
Rural localities in Zaraysky District:

- Altukhovo
- Altukhovo
- Aponitishchi
- Astramyevo
- Avdeyevo
- Borisovo-Okolitsy
- Chiryakovo
- Gololobovo

== See also ==
- Lists of rural localities in Russia
