= Altukhovo =

Altukhovo (Russian: Алтухово) is the name of several inhabited localities in Russia.

Urban localities

- Altukhovo, Bryansk Oblast, a work settlement in Navlinsky District of Bryansk Oblast

Rural localities

- Altukhovo, Kaluga Oblast, a village in Zhukovsky District of Kaluga Oblast
- Altukhovo, Podolsky District, Moscow Oblast, a village in Lagovskoye Rural Settlement of Podolsky District of Moscow Oblast
- Altukhovo, Gololobovskoye Rural Settlement, Zaraysky District, Moscow Oblast, a village in Gololobovskoye Rural Settlement of Zaraysky District of Moscow Oblast
- Altukhovo, Karinskoye Rural Settlement, Zaraysky District, Moscow Oblast, a village in Karinskoye Rural Settlement of Zaraysky District of Moscow Oblast
- Altukhovo, Nizhny Novgorod Oblast, a village in Kazakovsky Selsoviet of Vachsky District of Nizhny Novgorod Oblast
- Altukhovo, Klepikovsky District, Ryazan Oblast, a village in Tyukovsky Rural Okrug of Klepikovsky District of Ryazan Oblast
- Altukhovo, Ryazansky District, Ryazan Oblast, a village in Semenovsky Rural Okrug of Ryazansky District of Ryazan Oblast
- Altukhovo, Samara Oblast, a selo in Kinel-Cherkassky District of Samara Oblast
