= Abramtsevo =

Abramtsevo (Russian: Абрамцево) is the name of several rural localities in Russia:

- Abramtsevo (selo), Dmitrovsky District, Moscow Oblast, a selo in Sinkovskoye Rural Settlement of Dmitrovsky District in Moscow Oblast; 56°24′N 37°14′E
- Abramtsevo (village), Dmitrovsky District, Moscow Oblast, a village in Sinkovskoye Rural Settlement of Dmitrovsky District in Moscow Oblast; 56°25′N 37°11′E
- Abramtsevo, Sergiyevo-Posadsky District, Moscow Oblast, a selo under the administrative jurisdiction of the Town of Khotkovo in Sergiyevo-Posadsky District of Moscow Oblast; 56°14′N 37°59′E
- Abramtsevo, Vologda Oblast, a village in Spassky Selsoviet of Vologodsky District in Vologda Oblast

== See also ==
- Abramtsev, Russian last name
