= Gololobovo =

Gololobovo (Russian: Гололобово) is the name of several rural localities in Russia:

- Gololobovo, Bryansk Oblast, a village in Revensky Selsoviet of Navlinsky District of Bryansk Oblast
- Gololobovo, Lipetsk Oblast, a village in Sotnikovsky Selsoviet of Krasninsky District of Lipetsk Oblast
- Gololobovo, Kolomensky District, Moscow Oblast, a selo in Biorkovskoye Rural Settlement of Kolomensky District of Moscow Oblast
- Gololobovo, Zaraysky District, Moscow Oblast, a village in Gololobovskoye Rural Settlement of Zaraysky District of Moscow Oblast
- Gololobovo, Smolensk Oblast, a village in Netrizovskoye Rural Settlement of Kardymovsky District of Smolensk Oblast
