= Bespyatovo =

Bespyatovo (Russian: Беспятово) is the name of several rural localities in Moscow Oblast, Russia:

- Bespyatovo, Stupinsky District, Moscow Oblast, a village in Aksinyinskoye Rural Settlement of Stupinsky District
- Bespyatovo, Zaraysky District, Moscow Oblast, a village in Gololobovskoye Rural Settlement of Zaraysky District
