= Gzhel (disambiguation) =

Gzhel is a Russian style of ceramics.

Gzhel may also refer to:

- Gzhel (rural locality), several rural localities in Russia
- Gzhel railway station, a railway station on the Moscow–Kazan line in the vicinity of Gzhel (selo), Moscow Oblast
- Gzhel (theater), a Russian dance theater of Vladimir Mikhailovich Zakharov

== See also ==
- Gzhelian, the youngest stage of the Pennsylvanian geologic period
- Gzhelskogo kirpichnogo zavoda, a rural locality (a settlement) in Ramensky District of Moscow Oblast, Russia
