= Chepelyovo =

Chepelyovo (Russian: Чепелёво) is the name of several rural localities in Russia:

- Chepelyovo, Moscow Oblast, a village in Stremilovskoye Rural Settlement of Chekhovsky District, Moscow Oblast
- Chepelyovo, Smolensk Oblast, a village in Sobolevskoye Rural Settlement of Monastyrshchinsky District of Smolensk Oblast
