= Dmitrovsky =

Dmitrovsky (masculine), Dmitrovskaya (feminine), or Dimtrovskoye (neuter) may refer to:

- Dmitrovsky District, name of several districts in Russia
- Dmitrovsky (rural locality) (Dmitrovskaya, Dmitrovskoye), name of several inhabited localities in Russia
- Dmitrovskaya (Moscow Metro), a station of the Moscow Metro, Moscow, Russia
