= Shakhovsky =

Shakhovsky or Shakhovskoy (Russian: Шаховский or Шаховской; masculine), Shakhovskaya (Шаховская; feminine), or Shakhovskoye (Шаховское) is the name of several inhabited localities in Russia:

Urban localities

- Shakhovskaya, Moscow Oblast, a work settlement in Shakhovskoy District of Moscow Oblast

Rural localities

- Shakhovsky (rural locality), a settlement in Mosalsky District of Kaluga Oblast
- Shakhovskoye, Kurkinsky District, Tula Oblast, a village in Ivanovskaya Volost of Kurkinsky District of Tula Oblast
- Shakhovskoye, Uzlovsky District, Tula Oblast, a selo in Krasnolesskaya Rural Administration of Uzlovsky District of Tula Oblast
- Shakhovskoye, Ulyanovsk Oblast, a selo in Shakhovsky Rural Okrug of Pavlovsky District of Ulyanovsk Oblast
- Shakhovskaya, Irkutsk Oblast, a village in Alarsky District of Irkutsk Oblast

== See also ==
- Shakhovsky (surname)
- Shakhovskoy surname
