= Aleshino =

Aleshino or Alyoshino may refer to:

- Aleshino, Dmitrovsky District, Moscow Oblast, a village in Dmitrovsky District of Moscow Oblast, Russia
- Aleshino, Pushkinsky District, Moscow Oblast, a village in Pushkinsky District of Moscow Oblast, Russia
- Aleshino, Ruzsky District, Moscow Oblast, a village in Ruzsky District of Moscow Oblast, Russia
- Aleshino, Shatursky District, Moscow Oblast, a village in Shatursky District of Moscow Oblast, Russia
- Aleshino, Voskresensky District, Moscow Oblast, a village (slobodka) in Voskresensky District of Moscow Oblast, Russia
- Alyoshino, Yegoryevsky District, Moscow Oblast, a village in Yegoryevsky District of Moscow Oblast, Russia
- Aleshino, Novgorod Oblast, a village in Novgorod Oblast, Russia
- Aleshino, name of several other rural localities in Russia
