= Abramtsev =

Abramtsev (Russian: Абра́мцев; masculine) or Abramtseva (Абра́мцева; feminine) is a Russian patronymic surname derived from "Abramets", a diminutive of the Hebrew name Abraham (Abram).

== See also ==
- Abramtsevo, several localities in Russia

== Sources ==
- В. А. Никонов (V. A. Nikonov). "Словарь русских фамилий" (Dictionary of the Russian Last Names). Москва, 1993. ISBN 5-88527-011-2.
