= 2nd Pyatiletka =

2nd Pyatiletka 2-я Пятилетка
- Village
- Location within Moscow Oblast Location within Russia
- Coordinates: 55.090278°N 38.2375°E
- Country: Russia
- Region: Moscow Oblast
- District: Stupinsky District
- Time zone: UTC+03:00

2nd Pyatiletka (Russian: 2-я Пятиле́тка) is a rural locality (a village) in Leontyevskoye Rural Settlement of Stupinsky District, Russia. The population was 0 as of 2010.

== Streets ==
- Leontievskaya

== Geography ==
2nd Pyatiletka is located 36 km northeast of Stupino (the district's administrative centre) by road. Avdulovo-2 is the nearest rural locality.
