= Petrovo-Dalneye =

Petrovo-Dalneye Петрово-Дальнее
- Village
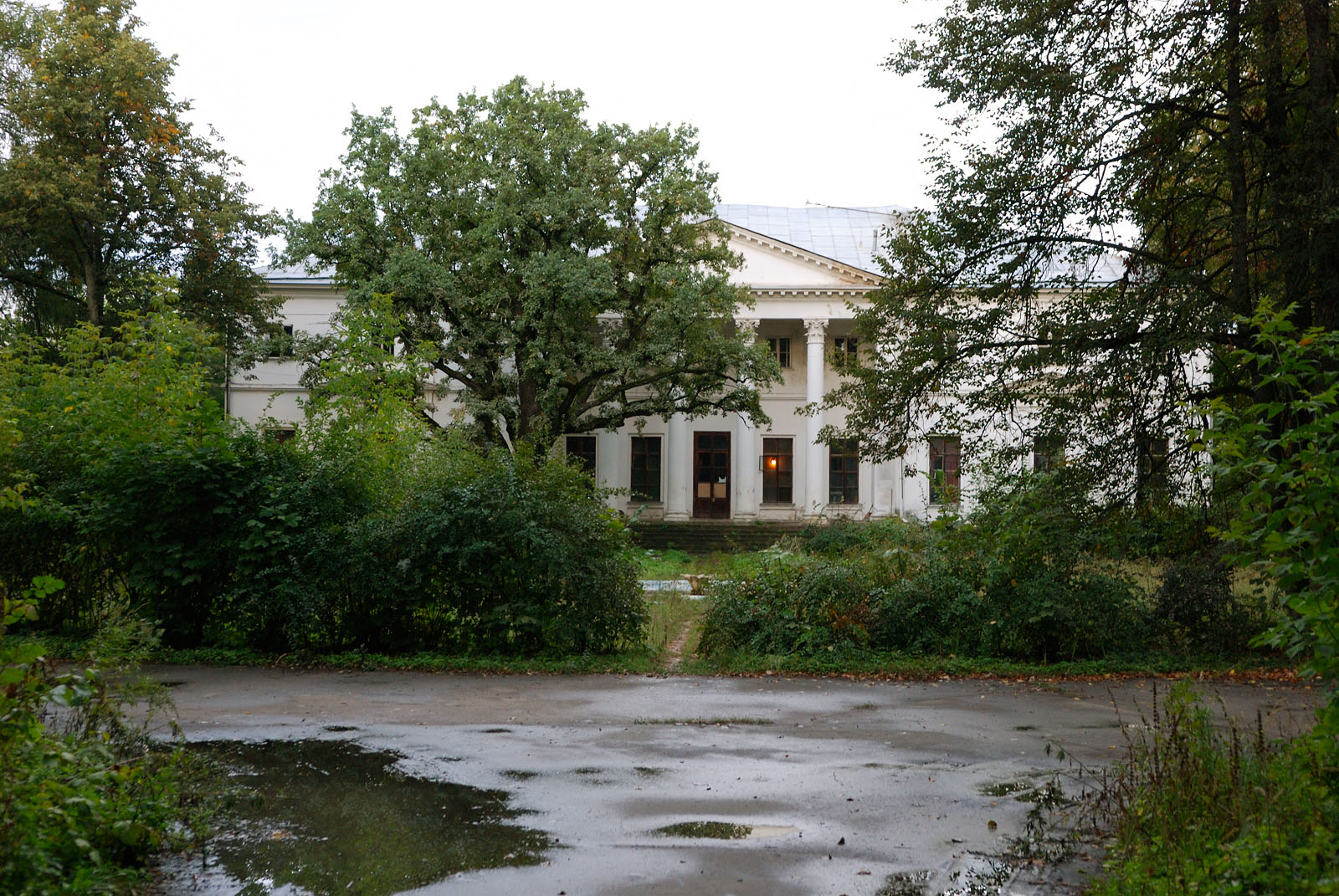
- Interactive map of Petrovo-Dalneye
- Location of Petrovo-Dalneye Petrovo-Dalneye (Moscow Oblast)
- Coordinates: 55°45′11″N 37°10′02″E
- Country: Russia
- Federal subject: Moscow Oblast
- Administrative district: Krasnogorsky District

Population (2010 Census)
  - Total: 2,001
  - Estimate (2010): 2,001 (0%)

Municipal status
  - Municipal district: Krasnogorsky District
- Time zone: UTC+3 (MSK)
- Postal code: 143422
- Dialing code: +7 495
- OKTMO ID: 46623404186

Petrovo-Dalneye (Russian: Петрово-Дальнее) is a rural locality (a selo) in Krasnogorsky District of Moscow Oblast. It is located on the high left bank of the Moskva River, at the confluence of the Istra River.

The locality is home to an estate of the same name which belonged to the Prozorovsky princes and later to one of the branches of the princely family Golitsyn. It is a cultural heritage site of federal significance.

Former leader of the Soviet Union Nikita Khrushchev lived in the locality in a six-room house after his ouster from power in 1964.
