= Astramyevo =

Astramyevo Астрамьево
- Village
- Interactive map of Astramyevo
- Location of Astramyevo Astramyevo (Moscow Oblast)
- Coordinates: 54°45′24″N 39°09′09″E
- Country: Russia
- Federal subject: Moscow Oblast

Population
  - Estimate (2005): 17 )

Municipal status
  - Municipal district: Zaraysky District
  - Rural settlement: Gololobovkoye Rural Settlement
- Time zone: UTC+3 (MSK)
- Postal code: 140621
- OKTMO ID: 46616408116

Astramyevo (Russian: Астрамьево) is a village in Zaraysky District, Moscow Oblast, Russia. It is located 17.5 kilometres (10.9 mi) east from Zaraysk.
