= Avdotyino, Aksinyinskoye Rural Settlement, Stupinsky District, Moscow Oblast =

Avdotyino Авдотьино
- Village
- Location within Moscow Oblast Location within Russia
- Coordinates: 55°14′N 38°11′E
- Country: Russia
- Region: Moscow Oblast
- District: Stupinsky District
- Time zone: UTC+3:00

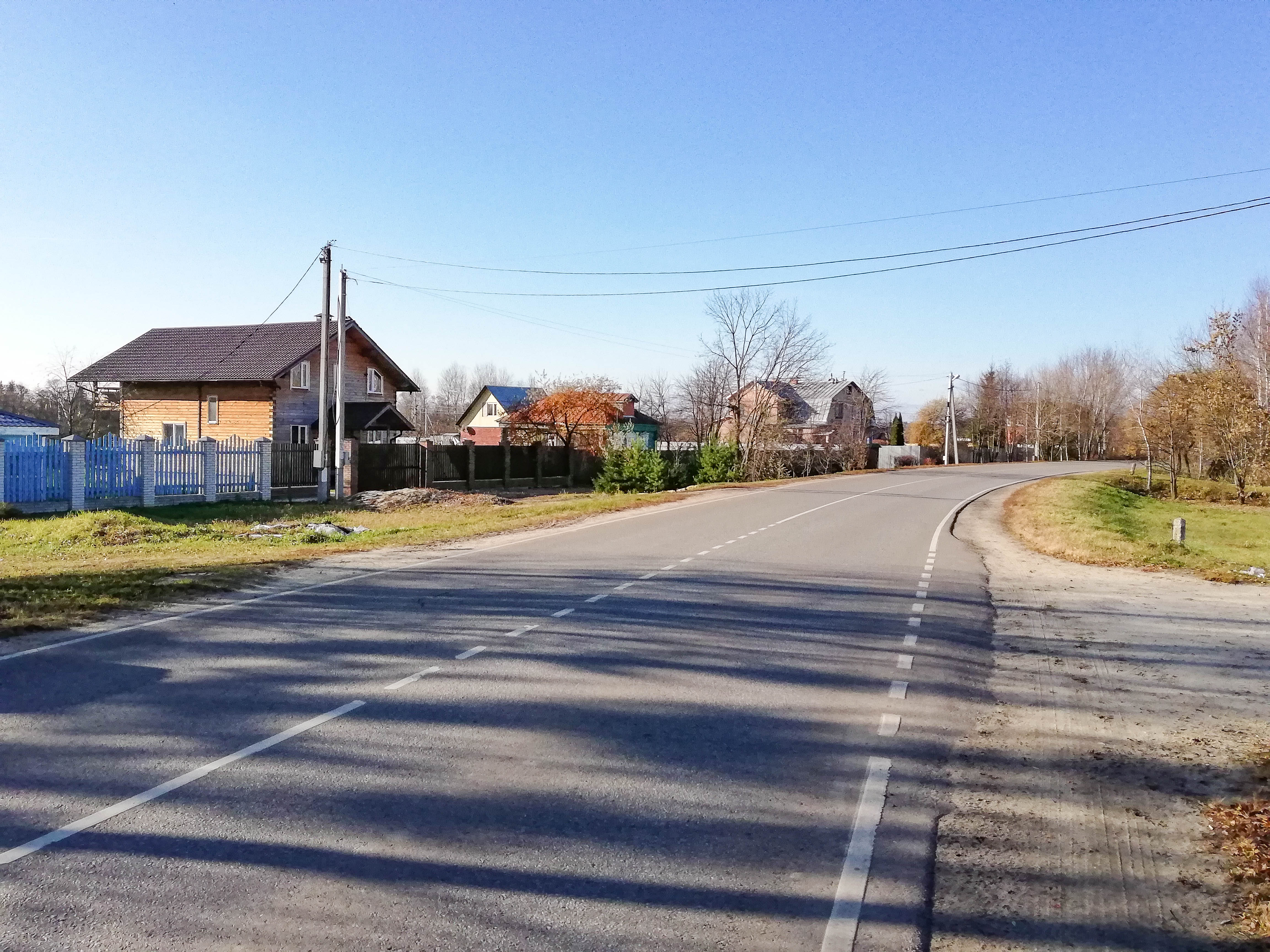
A picture of Avdotino

Avdotyino (Russian: Авдо́тьино) is a rural locality (a selo) in Aksinyinskoye Rural Settlement of Aksinyinskoye Rural Settlement, Stupinsky District, Moscow Oblast, Russia. The population was 75 as of 2010. There are 4 streets.

== Geography ==
The khutor is located between rivers Kononkova and Severka, 49 km north of Stupino (the district's administrative centre) by road. Bolshoye Alexeyevskoye is the nearest rural locality.
