= St. Nicholas Church (Buzhaninovo) =

- Saint Nicholas the Wonderworker Church
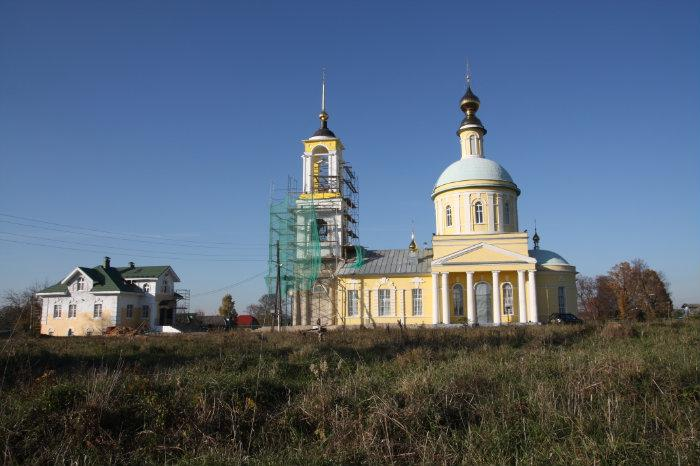
- A view of the church's south side

- Buzhaninovo, Moscow Region
- 56°23′18″N 38°17′42″E
- Country: Russia
- Denomination: Russian Orthodox
- Website: https://www.holyfield.ru

History
- Status: Church
- Dedication: St.Nicholas

Architecture
- Functional status: Active
- Style: Empire
- Completed: 1831

Administration
- Diocese: Moscow Eparchy
- Deanery: Sergiyev-Posad

Clergy
- Priest: Rev. Nikolay

St. Nicholas Church is a 19th-century Russian Orthodox church in the town of Buzhaninovo in the Moscow region.

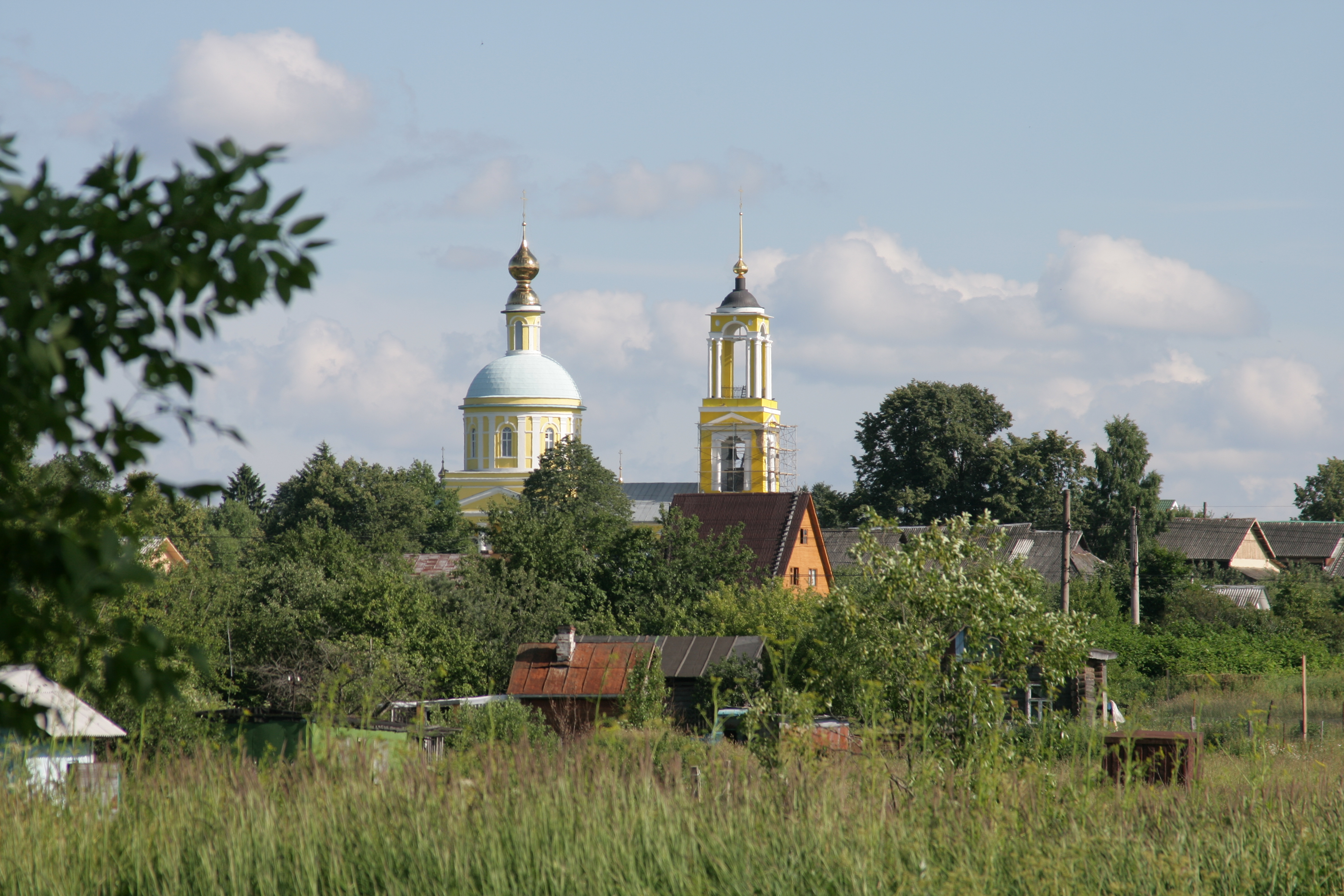
View of St.Nicholas church from the downhill railroad

== History ==
According to historical records, the earliest (and the only) temple in Buzhaninovo was a St. Nicholas Church, first mentioned in 1543. In 1734 a new wooden construction replaced the time-worn church and was consecrated by the superior of the neighboring Holy Trinity Monastery, Archimandrite Varlaam.

A century later, a new stone church was built on the site in the Empire style. The central altar was dedicated to St. Nicholas, while the side-altar was dedicated to the Theophany.

In the 1940s the church was closed and the services and masses were terminated, the bell tower was demolished and the church building was turned into a warehouse. In the early 1990s, with the change of the political climate in Russia, the church was returned to the local Christian community. The church building was restored, and was consecrated in 1998. On December 19, 2000 (St. Nicholas day, the church's patronal feast), a relic of St. Nicholas was granted to the church.

The church building and the bell tower have recently been restored. The new rectory building next to the church's West entrance accommodates a Sunday school and local parish assemblies.
