= Avdulovo-2 =

Avdulovo-2 Авдулово-2
- Village
- Location within Moscow Oblast Location within Russia
- Coordinates: 55°04′N 38°16′E
- Country: Russia
- Region: Moscow Oblast
- District: Stupinsky District
- Time zone: UTC+3:00

Avdulovo-2 (Russian: Авду́лово-2) is a rural locality (a village) in Leontyevskoye Rural Settlement of Stupinsky District, Moscow Oblast, Russia. The population was 5 as of 2010. There is 1 street.

== Geography ==
The village is located on the left bank of the Sukusha River, 34 km northeast of Stupino (the district's administrative centre) by road. Avdulovo-1 is the nearest rural locality.
