= Avdulovo-1 =

Avdulovo-1 Авдулово-1
- Village
- Location within Moscow Oblast Location within Russia
- Coordinates: 55°04′N 38°16′E
- Country: Russia
- Region: Moscow Oblast
- District: Stupinsky District
- Time zone: UTC+3:00

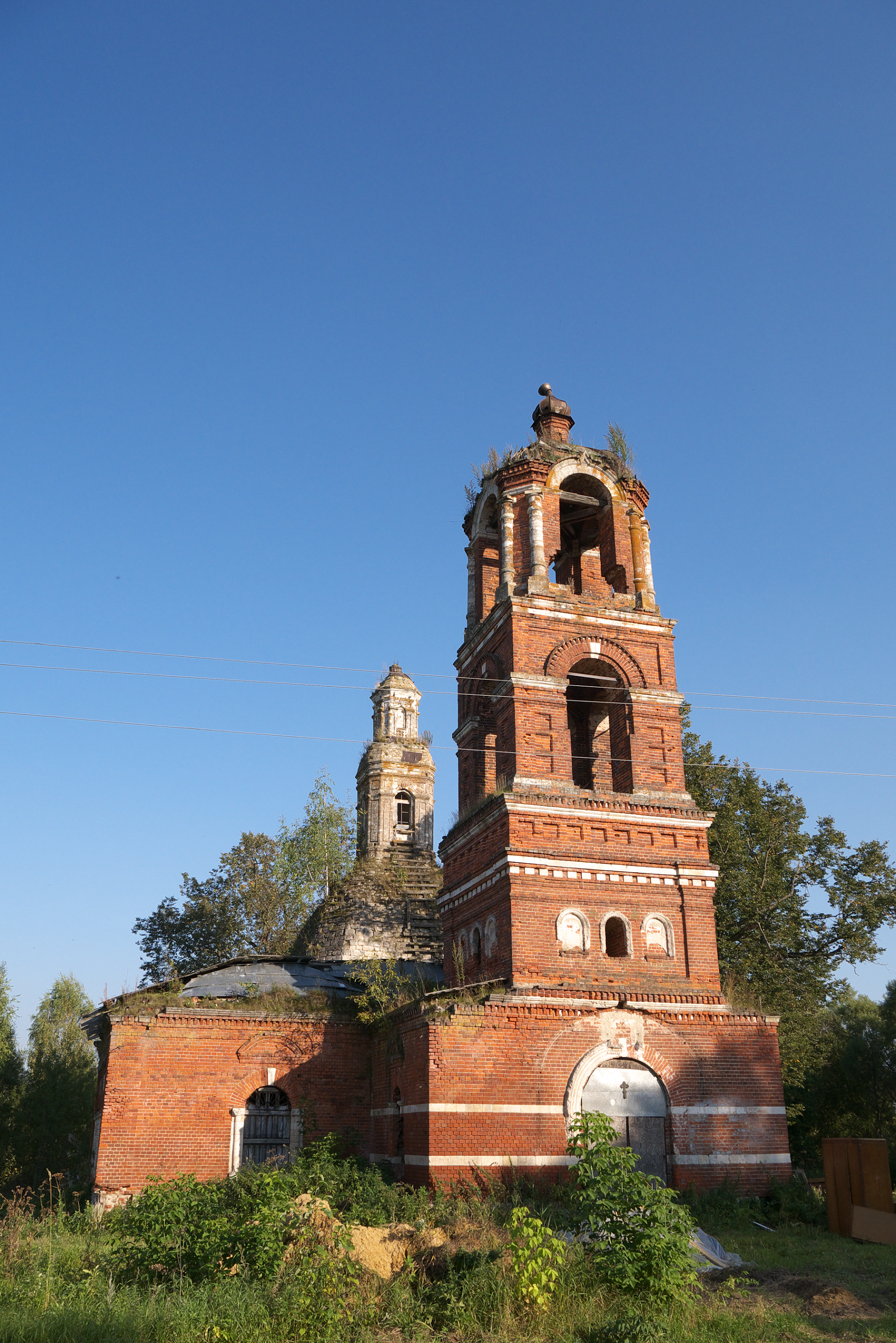
Church of the Intercession of the Holy Virgin, Avdulovo (Avdulovo-1), Stupino District, Moscow Region

Avdulovo-1 (Russian: Авду́лово-1) is a rural locality (a selo) in Leontyevskoye Rural Settlement of Stupinsky District, Moscow Oblast, Russia. The population was 11 as of 2010. There is 1 street.

== Geography ==
The village is located on the left bank of the Sukusha River, 34 km northeast of Stupino (the district's administrative centre) by road. Avdulovo-2 is the nearest rural locality.
