= Avdotyino, Semyonovskoye Rural Settlement, Stupinsky District, Moscow Oblast =

Avdotyino Авдотьино
- Village
- Location within Moscow Oblast Location within Russia
- Coordinates: 55°02′N 37°44′E
- Country: Russia
- Region: Moscow Oblast
- District: Stupinsky District
- Time zone: UTC+3:00

Avdotyino (Russian: Авдо́тьино) is a rural locality (a village) in Semyonovskoye Rural Settlement, Stupinsky District, Moscow Oblast, Russia. The population was 7 as of 2010. There are 8 streets.

== Geography ==
The village is located on the right tributary of the Lopasnya River near villages Semyonovskoe, Myshenskoe and Kolychevo, 41 km northwest of Stupino (the district's administrative centre) by road. Semyonovskoye is the nearest rural locality.
