= Borisovo-Okolitsy =

Borisovo-Okolitsy Борисово-Околицы
- Village
- Interactive map of Borisovo-Okolitsy
- Location of Borisovo-Okolitsy Borisovo-Okolitsy (Moscow Oblast)
- Coordinates: 54°47′22″N 38°57′34″E
- Country: Russia
- Federal subject: Moscow Oblast
- Administrative district: Zaraysky District
- Rural settlementSelsoviet: Gololobovskoye Rural Settlement
- Elevation: 176 m (577 ft)

Population
  - Estimate (2005): 52 )

Municipal status
  - Municipal district: Zaraysky Municipal District
  - Rural settlement: Gololobovkoye Rural Settlement
- Time zone: UTC+3 (MSK)
- Postal code: 140620
- OKTMO ID: 46616408136

Borisovo-Okolitsy (Russian: Борисово-Околицы) is a rural locality (a village) in Zaraysky District of Moscow Oblast, Russia, located 6 kilometers (3.7 mi) northeast from the town of Zaraysk. Population: 52 (2005 est.).
