= Maloe Krutoe =

Maloe Krutoe Малое Крутое
- Village
- Interactive map of Maloe Krutoe
- Location of Maloe Krutoe Maloe Krutoe (Moscow Oblast)
- Coordinates: 55°52′48″N 35°15′16″E
- Country: Russia
- Federal subject: Moscow Oblast
- Founded: early 20th century

Population (2010 Census)
  - Total: 208
  - Estimate (2010): 208 (0%)

Municipal status
  - Municipal district: Shakhovskoy District
  - Rural settlement: Seredinskoe Rural Settlement
  - Capital of: http://xn----7sbb0bufl2bza.xn--p1ai/sereda_sp/ser_about/
- Time zone: UTC+3 (MSK)
- Postal code: 143723
- Dialing code: +7 +749637
- OKTMO ID: 46787000491
- Website: maloe-krytoe.narod.ru

Maloe Krutoe (Russian: Малое Крутое) is a village in Shakhovskoy District of Moscow Oblast, Russia, located in the far West of the Oblast, 34 kilometers (21 mi) South-West of the district center Shahovskaya, 170 kilometers (110 mi) to the West of Moscow and 270 kilometers (170 mi) to the North-East of Smolensk, headwater Ruza and Inoch. The population is 208 people (according to the population census of 2010).

== History ==
The village arose in the early 20th century on the site where were situated outbuildings residents Krutoe (later – Bolshoe Krutoe, burned by the German invaders in 1942 and not revived). There was a brick factory in Maloe Krutoe before the Second World War. During the period of collectivization in 1930, there was built a kolkhoz (collective farm) named after Lenin.

October 13, 1941 Maloe Krutoe was occupied by German and Finnish troops. It was released during the Battle of Moscow on January 24, 1942. The invaders burned the village during the retreat, like most of the neighboring villages.

Maloe Krutoe was rebuilt after the Second World War. In 1954 a farm named Novo-Aleksandrovsky was founded as a result of consolidation of collective farms. At the end of the 1960s people made an asphalt road in the village and bus service to Shakhovskaya, and then to Moscow. However the bus stop in Maloe Krutoe was named Novo-Aleksandrovka - the name of the village, which had existed in 5 km to the North (destroyed in 1942; it was rebuilt several houses after the war, but they were settled by the mid-1950s).

Until the mid-1990s in Maloe Krutoe had existed a cattle farm where people had grown young cattle. It was closed due to economic problems in Russia.

== Transport and social sphere ==
In October 2015 there was a shop, a club and a bus stop "Novo-Aleksandrovka" in Maloe Krutoe. In the early 21 century there was a granary, a forestry and a first-aid post, but the first half of the 2010s, they were closed. In the village there are about 90 houses, and a half of them are inhabited only in summer, so they are used as a summer residence.

The lack of work in the countryside is the reason for outflow of young, working-age population, mainly in Moscow. Many residents of Maloe Krutoe work on a shift work in Moscow and other cities of the Moscow region, while remaining to live in the village. The nearest school is located 7 kilometers (4.3 mi) to the East, in the village of Dubranivka.

Everyday from the bus stop "Novo-Aleksandrovka" are sent 8 bus lines, one of them goes to Moscow (Tushinskaya Metro Station). The road to the village is in good condition, the last renovation took place in 2013.

== Population ==
According to the 1926 census there were 110 people in Maloe Krutoe. In 2002 there were 160 inhabitants, in 2010 were 208 inhabitants.

== Gallery ==
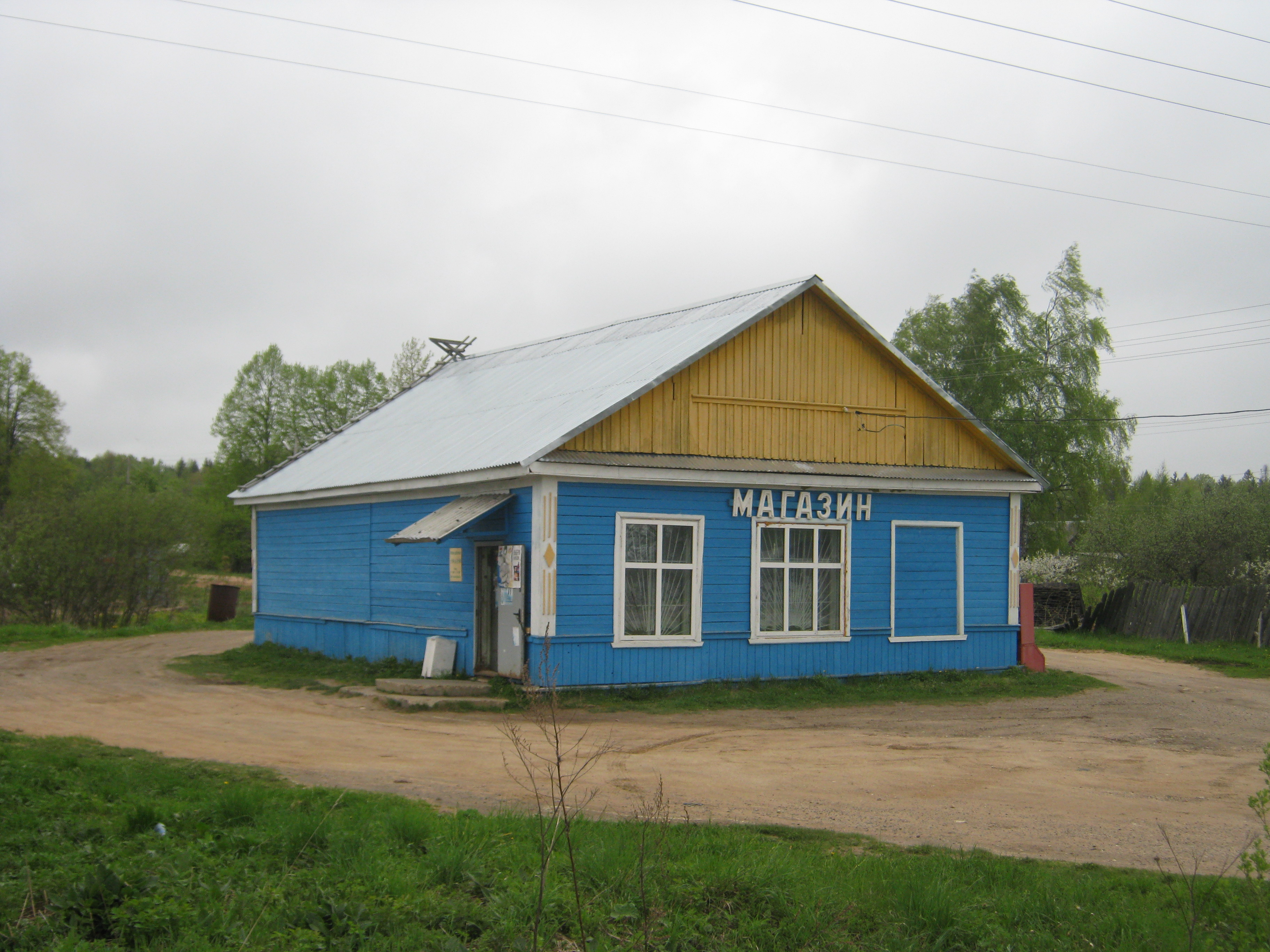
Village shop

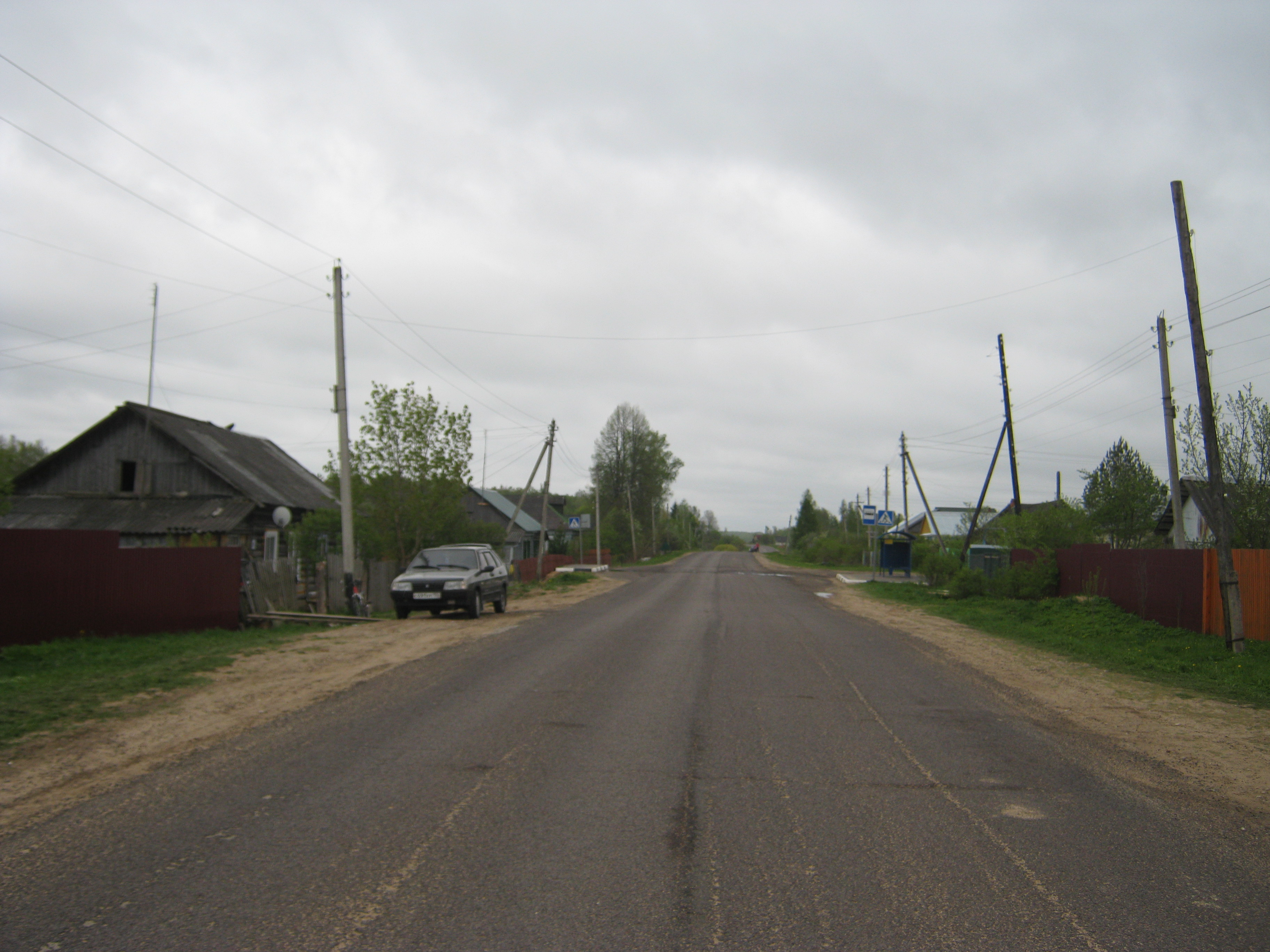
Rogov street. View from North to South

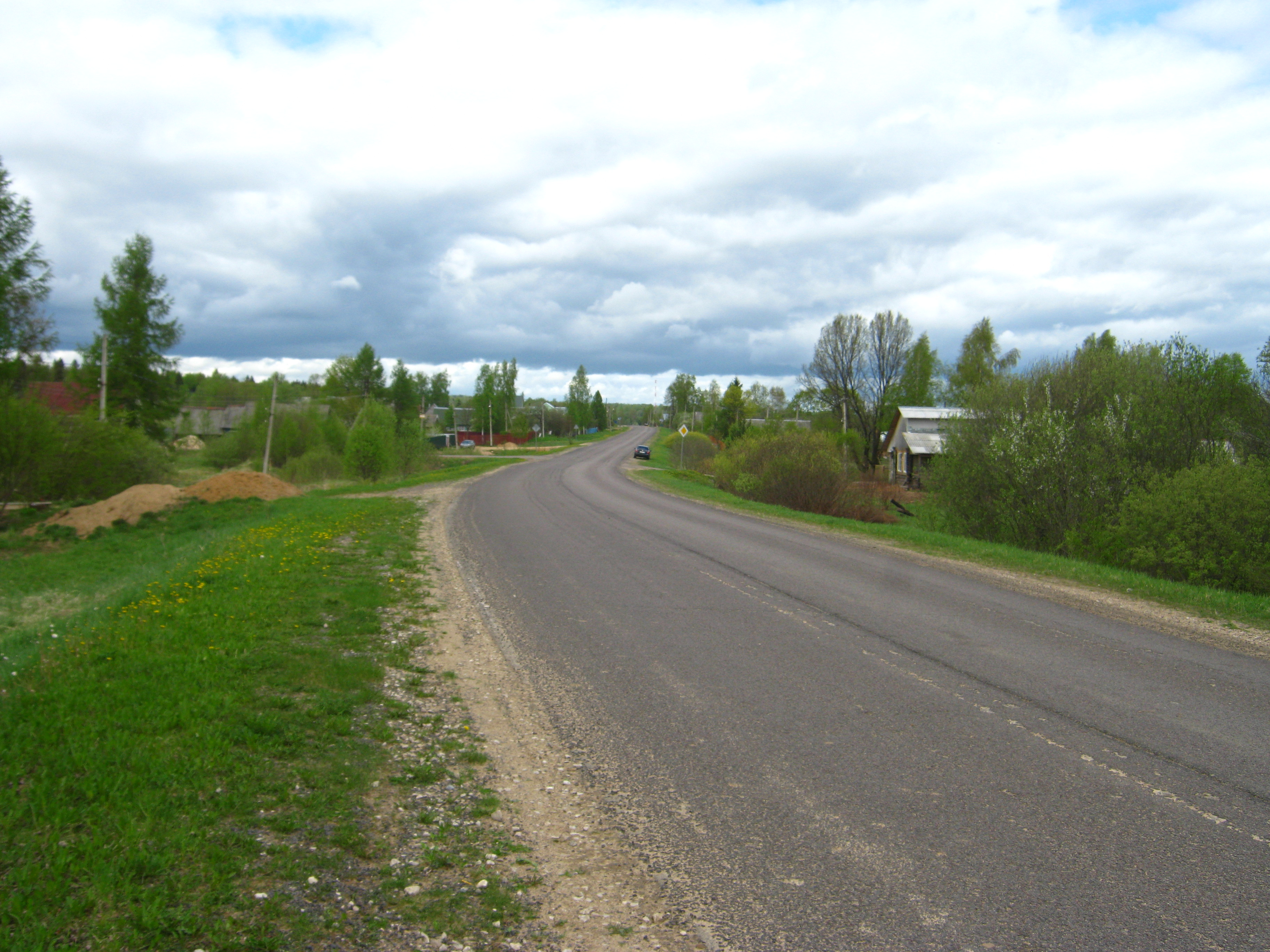
Rogov street. View from South to North

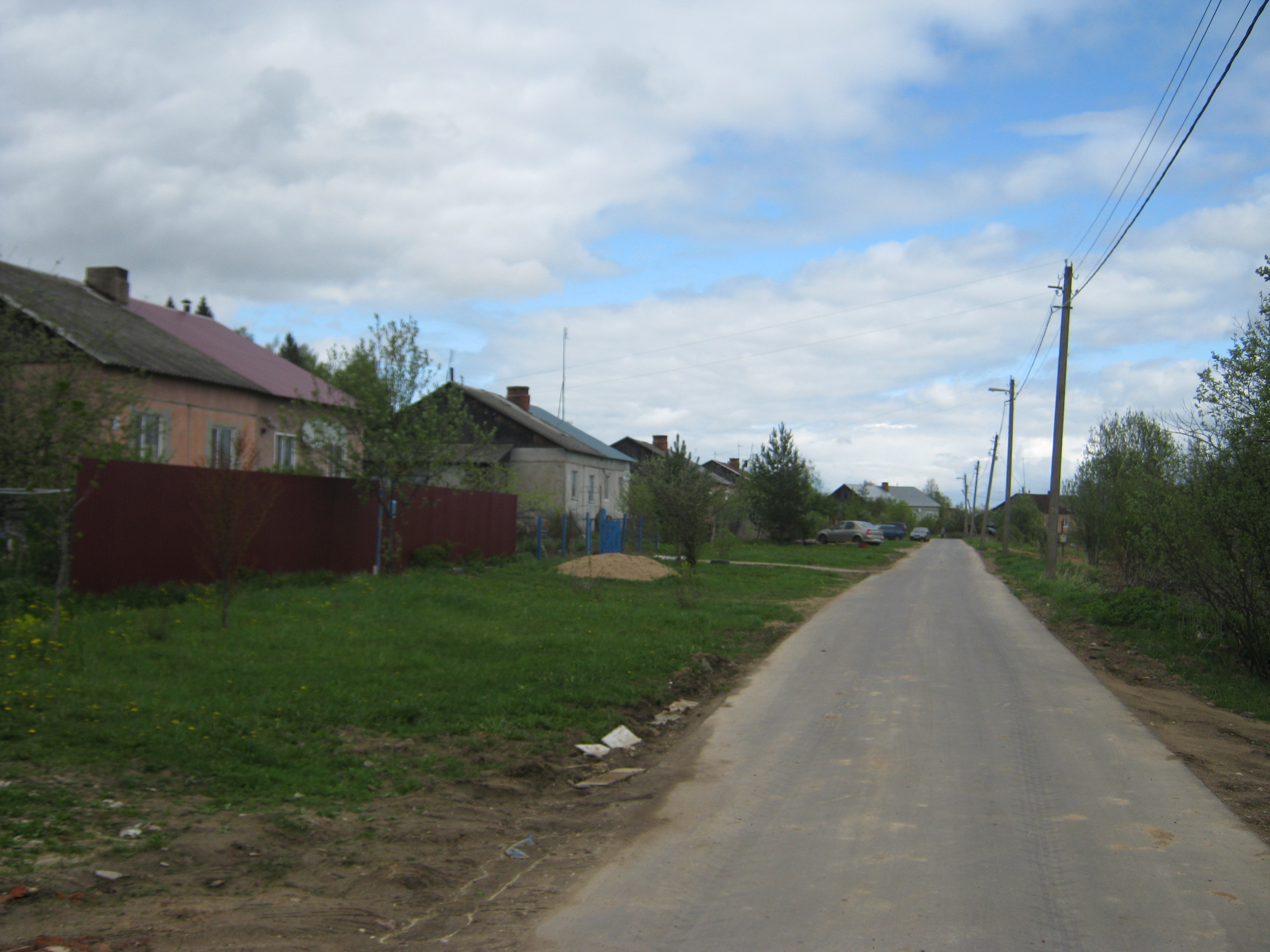
Cottages

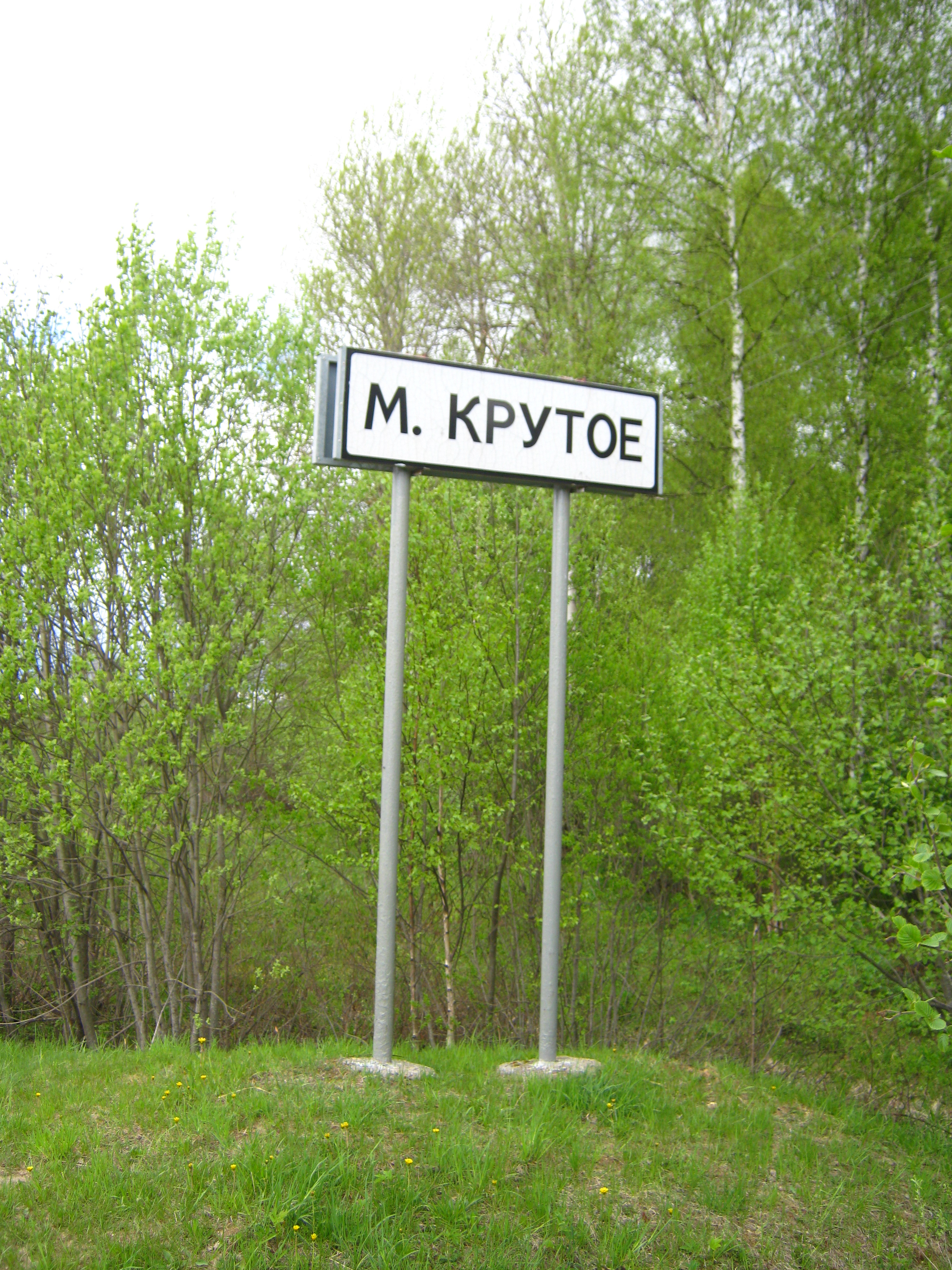
Road sign at the entrance to the village

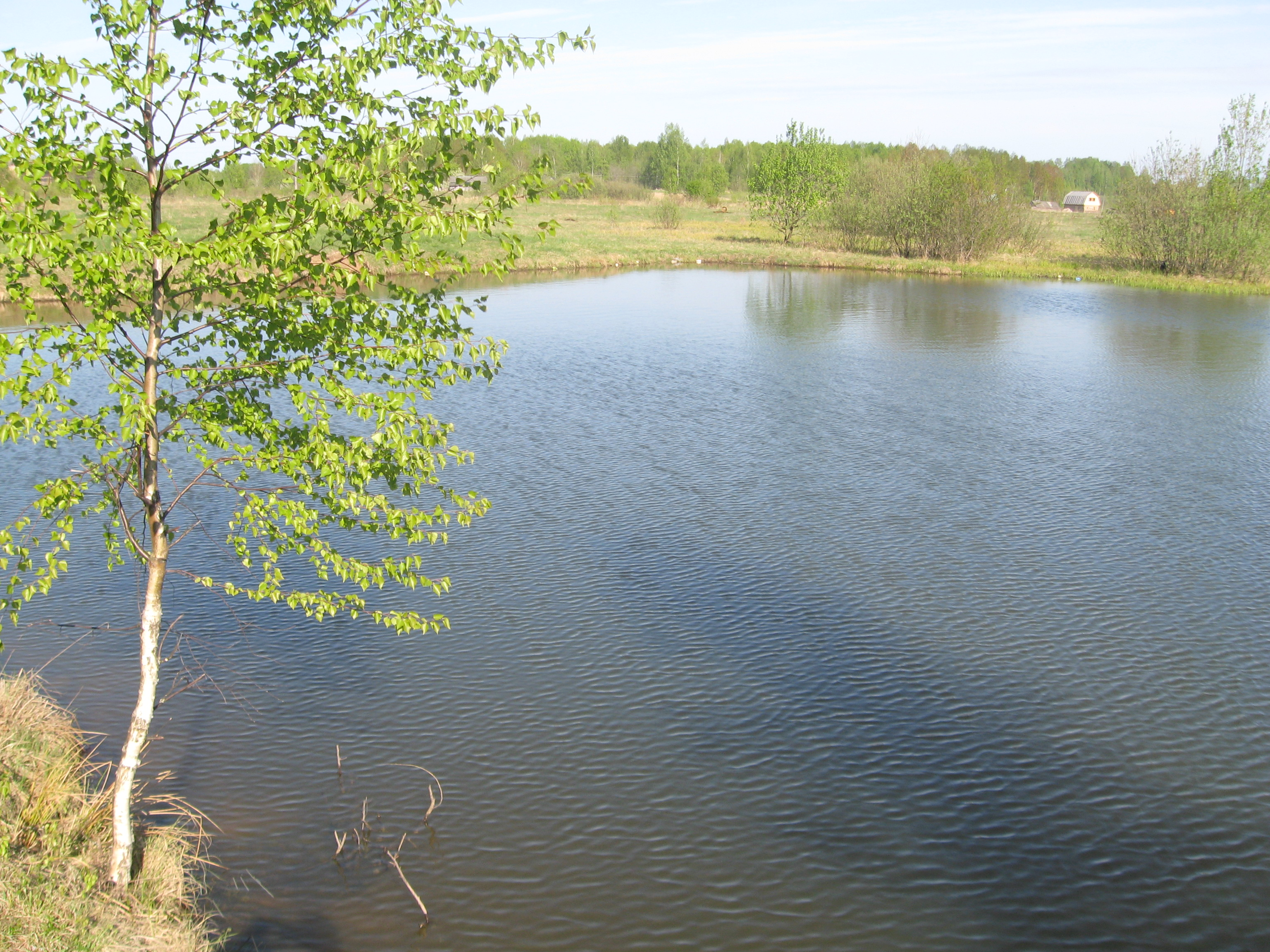
Davidov's pool

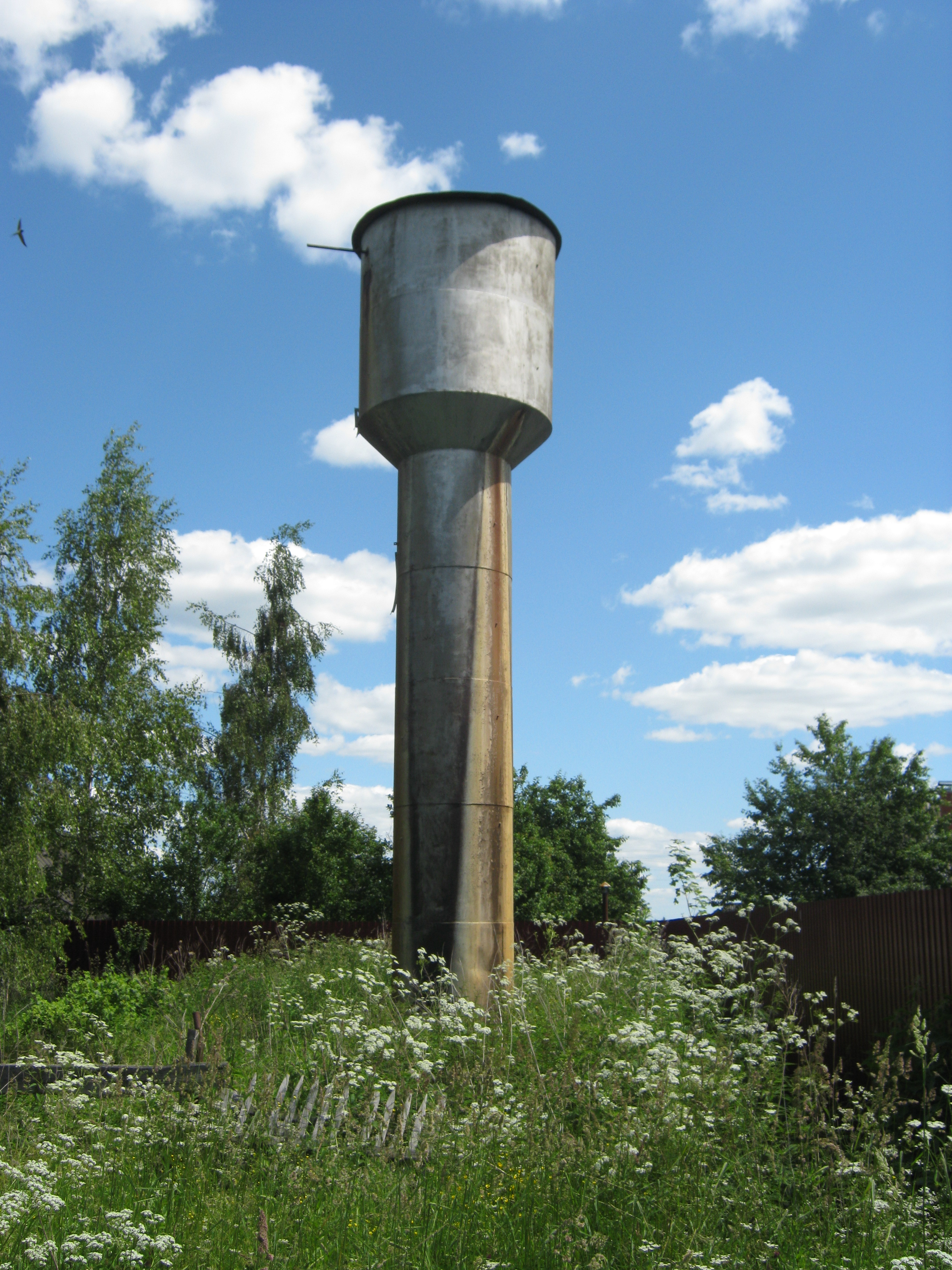
Water tower

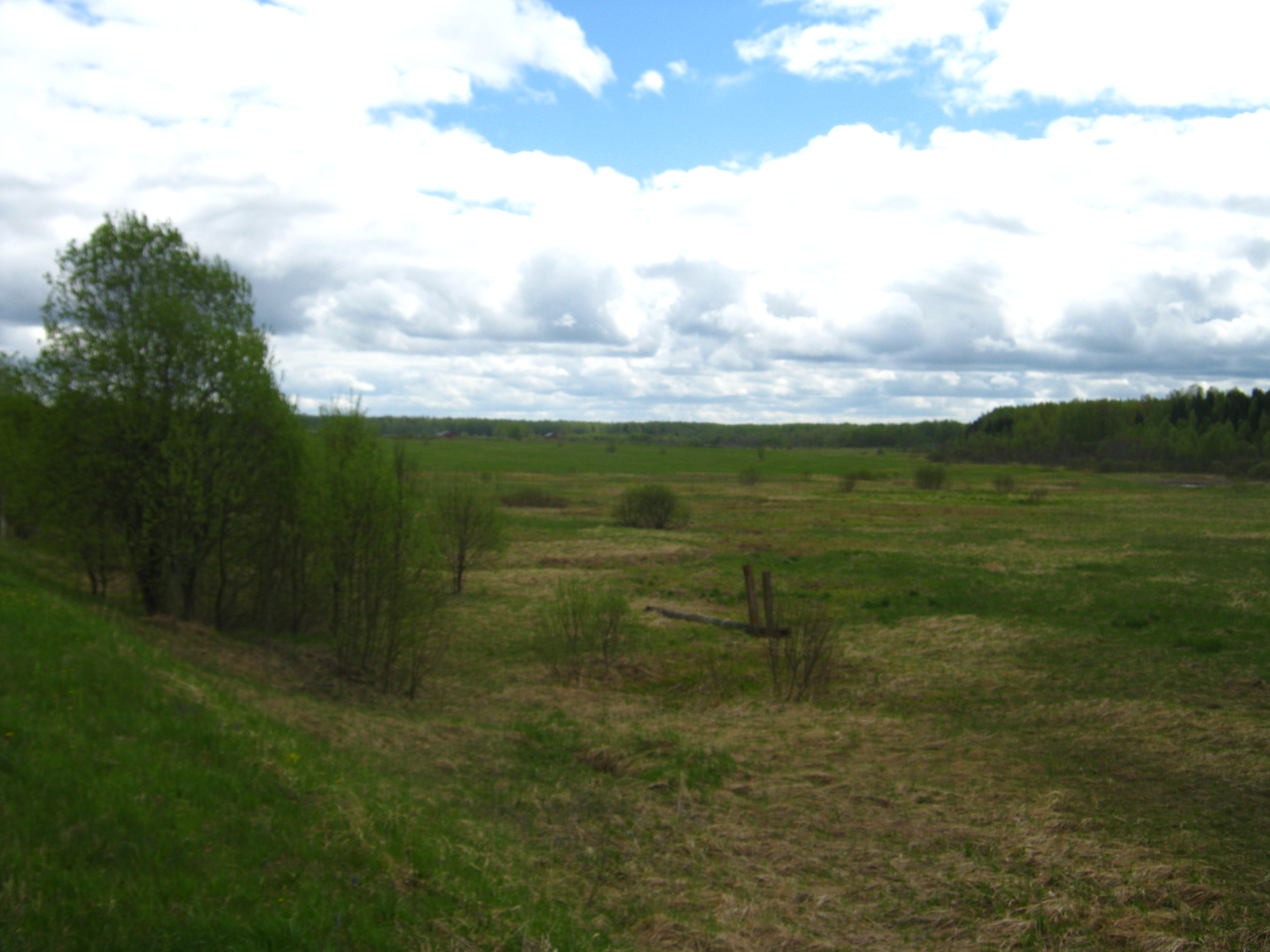
Field South of the village
