= Dmitrovsky (rural locality) =

Dmitrovsky (Russian: Дмитровский; masculine), Dmitrovskaya (Дмитровская; feminine), or Dmitrovskoye (Дмитровское; neuter) is the name of several rural localities in Russia:

- Dmitrovsky, Kaluga Oblast, a khutor in Kozelsky District of Kaluga Oblast
- Dmitrovsky, Oryol Oblast, a settlement in Kutafinsky Selsoviet of Kromskoy District of Oryol Oblast
- Dmitrovsky, Voronezh Oblast, a settlement in Verkhnetoydenskoye Rural Settlement of Anninsky District of Voronezh Oblast
- Dmitrovskoye, Krasnogorsky District, Moscow Oblast, a selo in Ilyinskoye Rural Settlement of Krasnogorsky District of Moscow Oblast
- Dmitrovskoye, Selkovskoye Rural Settlement, Sergiyevo-Posadsky District, Moscow Oblast, a village in Selkovskoye Rural Settlement of Sergiyevo-Posadsky District of Moscow Oblast
- Dmitrovskoye, Shemetovskoye Rural Settlement, Sergiyevo-Posadsky District, Moscow Oblast, a village in Shemetovskoye Rural Settlement of Sergiyevo-Posadsky District of Moscow Oblast
- Dmitrovskoye (settlement), Bogoslovskoye Settlement, Pestovsky District, Novgorod Oblast, a settlement in Bogoslovskoye Settlement of Pestovsky District of Novgorod Oblast
- Dmitrovskoye (village), Bogoslovskoye Settlement, Pestovsky District, Novgorod Oblast, a village in Bogoslovskoye Settlement of Pestovsky District of Novgorod Oblast
- Dmitrovskoye, Oryol Oblast, a selo in Yamskoy Selsoviet of Bolkhovsky District of Oryol Oblast
- Dmitrovskoye, Pskov Oblast, a village in Velikoluksky District of Pskov Oblast
- Dmitrovskoye (Mednovskoye Rural Settlement), Kalininsky District, Tver Oblast, a village in Kalininsky District of Tver Oblast; municipally, a part of Mednovskoye Rural Settlement of that district
- Dmitrovskoye (Zavolzhskoye Rural Settlement), Kalininsky District, Tver Oblast, a village in Kalininsky District of Tver Oblast; municipally, a part of Zavolzhskoye Rural Settlement of that district
- Dmitrovskoye (village), Torzhoksky District, Tver Oblast, a village in Torzhoksky District of Tver Oblast
- Dmitrovskoye (selo), Torzhoksky District, Tver Oblast, a selo in Torzhoksky District of Tver Oblast
