= Avdeyevo, Moscow Oblast =

Avdeyevo Авдеево
- Village
- Location within Moscow Oblast Location within Russia
- Coordinates: 54°40′N 38°52′E
- Country: Russia
- Region: Moscow Oblast
- District: Zaraysky District
- Time zone: UTC+3:00

Avdeyevo (Russian: Авдеево) is a rural locality (a village) in Zaraysky District, Moscow Oblast, Russia. The population was 977 as of 2010.

== Geography ==
Avdeyevo is located 14 km south of Zaraysk (the district's administrative centre) by road. Berezniki is the nearest rural locality.
