= Chiryakovo =

Chiryakovo Чирьяково
- Village
- Interactive map of Chiryakovo
- Location of Chiryakovo Chiryakovo (Moscow Oblast)
- Coordinates: 54°45′39″N 39°07′44″E
- Country: Russia
- Federal subject: Moscow Oblast
- Administrative district: Zaraysky District
- Rural settlementSelsoviet: Gololobovskoye Rural Settlement

Population
  - Estimate (2010): 12 )

Municipal status
  - Municipal district: Zaraysky Municipal District
  - Rural settlement: Gololobovskoye Rural Settlement
- Time zone: UTC+3 (MSK)
- Postal code: 140621
- OKTMO ID: 46616408271

Chiryakovo (Russian: Чирьяково) is a rural locality (a village) in Zaraysky District of Moscow Oblast, Russia, located 16 kilometers (9.9 mi) east from Zaraysk.
