= Lake Smerdyachye =

- Смердячье (Russian)
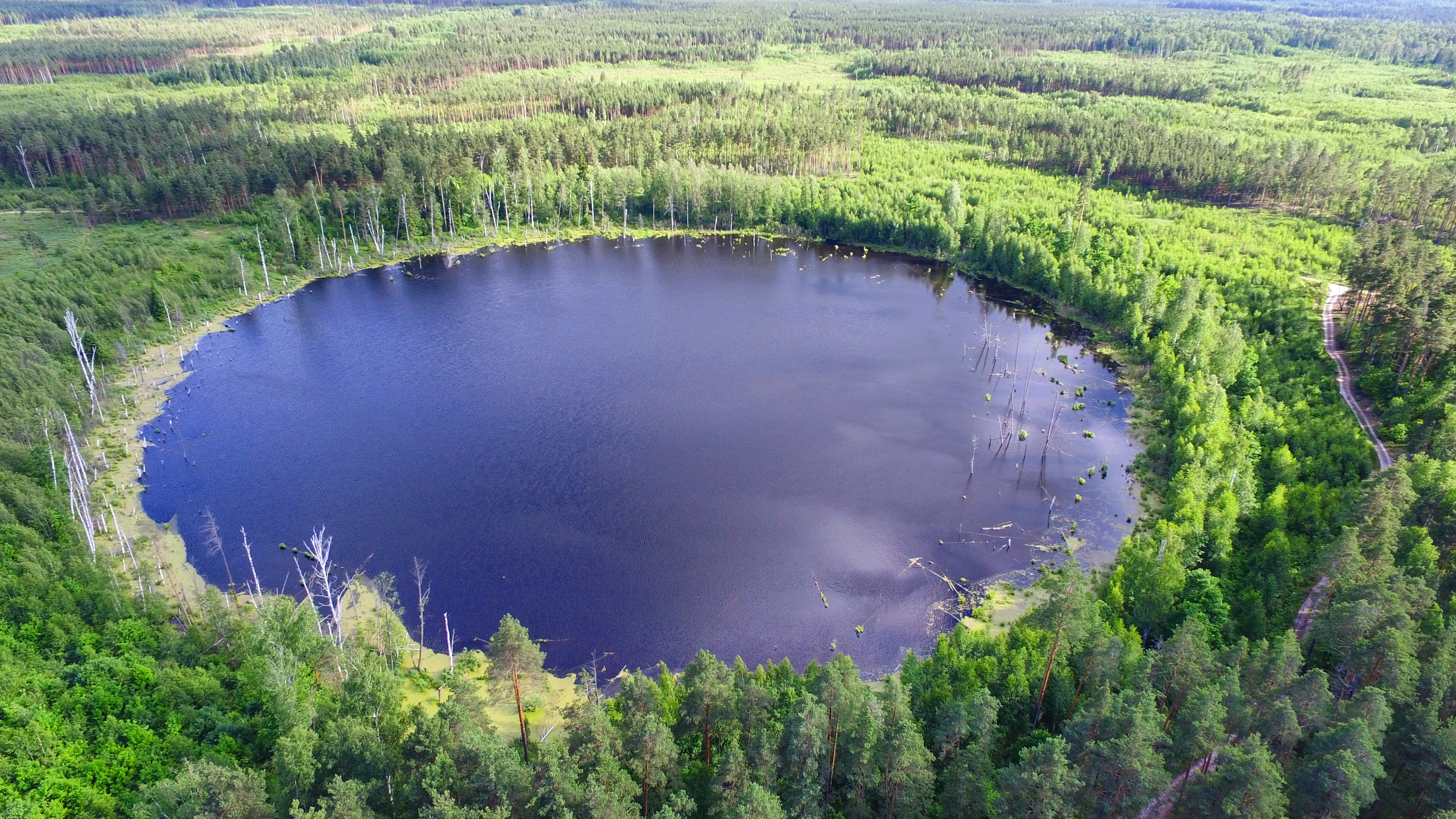
- Lake Smerdiacheje

- Location within Russia
- Location: Moscow Oblast, Russia
- Coordinates: 55.735°N 39.823°E
- Type: lake

Lake Smerdyachye (Озеро Смердячье - lake which smells bad) is a small lake in Moscow Oblast of Russia near Shatura 4 kilometres (2.5 mi) north from the nearest village Baksheevo (Бакшеево).

== Lake ==
The lake is situated in a pine forest. It is round (diameter 300–400 metres (980–1,310 ft)) and appeared thousands years ago as a meteor crater. Depth is 35–40 metres (115–131 ft). Until early 2000s it was thought it is of karst origin. The condition of the lake is slowly degrading. The water changes colour, level and purity with seasons and years, and pine trees come very close to the shore of the lake. Smerdiachee is surrounded with a wall-like ring which is common for craters.

== Transportation and tourism ==
The lake can be accessed from Moscow by car (the closest city is Roshal), but the last miles must be done on foot through the forest (people usually park their cars in Bakhscheevo village). Several dozen tourists visit Smerdyachye each year. The lake is also popular among UFO enthusiasts and mystics. Locals from the village use the lake sometimes for fishing and pick wild berries nearby.
