= Mikhail Shlyapnikov =

Russian farmer and entrepreneur

- Михаил Шляпников
- Citizenship: Russia
- Occupations: Farmer, crypto entrepreneur
- Known for: Kolion scrip, [KLN] cryptocurrency

Mikhail Shlyapnikov (Russian: Михаил Шляпников) is a Russian farmer, direct counter-economic activist and entrepreneur known for creating the kolion local currency scrip, and its post-ban cryptocurrency form.

== Career ==
Shlyapnikov worked in the business and finance sector since the 1990s. In 2007 he was diagnosed with an inoperable cancer. Following a car accident, he relocated to Kolionovo to become a farmer.

== Grassroots activism ==
Shlyapnikov first gained notoriety for fighting the 2010 Russian wildfires without government approval.

Shlyapnikov organized harassment of government officials entering Kolionovo, such as requiring a doctor's note proving their mental health and a recent fluorography lab test to prove that they do not have tuberculosis.

=== Kolion scrip ===
In 2014, during the Russian financial crisis, Shlyapnikov minted a scrip, the kolion, as an alternative to the ruble. The name is a truncation of Kolionovo. The scrip is a local currency usable only in Kolionovo, pegged to both 10kg of potatoes or 1/50 of a goose. Shlyapnikov sought to introduce kolions to promote a circular economy to improve Kolionovo's living conditions.

Kolion notes are one-sided and were printed by Shlyapnikov in multicolored denominations of one, three, five, ten, twenty-five and fifty Kolion. Every note had the following inscription:

«Билет является собственностью казны Колионово. Не подлежит инфляции, девальвации, стагнации и прочей фальсификации. Не является средством обогащения и спекуляции. Обеспечен собственными ресурсами Колионово. За подделку можно и того…»

Translation:

"This note is the property of the Kolionovo exchequer. It does not undergo inflation, deflation, stagnation or other falsifications. It is not a means of enrichment or speculation. It is supported by the resources of Kolionovo. Or maybe it’s a fake…"

On 1 July 2015, the kolion scrip was declared illegal tender by a Moscow regional court, and Shlyapnikov ordered to cease and desist printing.

== Cryptocurrency ==
In 2016, Shlyapnikov sold shares of his farm for Emercoin, allowing public speculation on his farm's production. He collected 800,000 ₽-equivalent in capital, and paid dividends via cryptocurrency.

Shlyapnikov went further to mint his own cryptocurrency token, reviving the kolion as [KLN]. The initial coin offering in April 2017 on Waves raised 401 ₿.

One year on, Shlyapnikov claimed over 100 people in the Kolionovo area were using [KLN] for transactions. He introduced a loan program for other farmers to receive chicks and split the egg production 50/50, on the condition that transactions are made in [KLN].
