= Aponitishchi =

Aponitishchi Апонитищи
- Village
- Interactive map of Aponitishchi
- Location of Aponitishchi Aponitishchi (Moscow Oblast)
- Coordinates: 54°49′14″N 39°02′13″E
- Country: Russia
- Federal subject: Moscow Oblast
- Administrative district: Zaraysky District
- Rural settlementSelsoviet: Gololobovskoye Rural Settlement

Population
  - Estimate (2010): 92 )

Municipal status
  - Municipal district: Zaraysky Municipal District
  - Rural settlement: Gololobovkoye Rural Settlement
- Time zone: UTC+3 (MSK)
- Postal code: 140610
- OKTMO ID: 46616408111

Aponitishchi (Russian: Апонитищи) is a rural locality (a village) in Zaraysky District of Moscow Oblast, Russia, located 12 kilometers (7.5 mi) northeast from Zaraysk.
