= 5th Gorki =

5th Gorki 5-е Горки
- Village
- Location within Moscow Oblast Location within Russia
- Coordinates: 55.9025°N 37.278611°E
- Country: Russia
- Region: Moscow Oblast
- District: Solnechnogorsky District
- Time zone: UTC+05:00

5th Gorki (Russian: 5-е Го́рки) is a rural locality (a village) in Kutuzovskoye Rural Settlement of Solnechnogorsky District, Russia. The population was 34 as of 2010.

== Geography ==
5th Gorki is located 49 km southeast of Solnechnogorsk (the district's administrative centre) by road. Yurlovo is the nearest rural locality.

== Streets ==
- Vesennyaya
- Lazurnaya
