= Altukhovo, Karinskoye Rural Settlement, Zaraysky District, Moscow Oblast =

Altukhovo Алтухово
- Village
- Interactive map of Altukhovo
- Location of Altukhovo Altukhovo (Moscow Oblast)
- Coordinates: 54°38′31″N 38°55′29″E
- Country: Russia
- Federal subject: Moscow Oblast
- Administrative district: Zaraysky District
- Rural settlementSelsoviet: Karinskoye Rural Settlement

Population
  - Estimate (2005): 63 )

Municipal status
  - Municipal district: Zaraysky Municipal District
  - Rural settlement: Karinskoye Rural Settlement
- Time zone: UTC+3 (MSK)
- Postal code: 140631
- OKTMO ID: 46616416116

Altukhovo (Russian: Алтухово) is a rural locality (a village) in Zaraysky District of Moscow Oblast, Russia. It is located 14 kilometers (8.7 mi) south from Zaraysk.
