= 4th Uchastok =

Rural locality in Moscow Oblast, Russia

4th Uchastok 4-й Участок
- Settlement
- Location within Moscow Oblast Location within Russia
- Coordinates: 56.163889°N 37.520833°E
- Country: Russia
- Region: Moscow Oblast
- District: Dmitrovsky District
- Time zone: UTC+03:00

4th Uchastok (Russian: 4-й Уча́сток) is a rural locality (a settlement) in Dmitrov Urban Settlement of Dmitrovsky District, Moscow Oblast, Russia. The population was 0 as of 2010. It had a population of 6 in 2002 and 2006.

== Geography ==
4th Uchastok is located 25 km south of Kargasok (the district's administrative centre) by road. 3rd Uchastok is the nearest rural locality.

== Streets ==
There are no named streets.
