= 12 posyolok =

12 posyolok 12 посёлок
- Settlement
- Location within Moscow Oblast Location within Russia
- Coordinates: 55.5°N 39.434444°E
- Country: Russia
- Region: Moscow Oblast
- District: Shatursky District
- Time zone: UTC+03:00

12 posyolok (Russian: 12 посёлок) is a rural locality (a settlement) in Shatura Urban Settlement of Shatursky District, Russia. The population was 159 as of 2010. To the north of the village in 1941-1943. There was a landing site of the 16th Guards Fighter Aviation Regiment, later used for agricultural aircraft. To the south of the village was the substation of the power supply of the Shatursky peat enterprise.

== Geography ==
12 posyolok is located 269 km northwest of Shatura (the district's administrative centre) by road.

== Streets ==
There are no streets with titles.
