= Aborino =

Aborino Аборино
- Village
- Location within Moscow Oblast Location within Russia
- Coordinates: 55°51′N 38°15′E
- Country: Russia
- Region: Moscow Oblast
- District: Noginsky District
- Time zone: [[UTC+3:00]]

Aborino (Russian: Аборино) is a rural locality (a village) in Aksyono-Butyrskoye Rural Settlement of Noginsky District, Moscow Oblast, Russia. The population was 69 as of 2010. There are 3 streets.

== Geography ==
Aborino is located 15 km west of Noginsk (the district's administrative centre) by road. Oborino Lyuks is the nearest rural locality.
