= 18 posyolok =

18 posyolok 18 посёлок
- Settlement
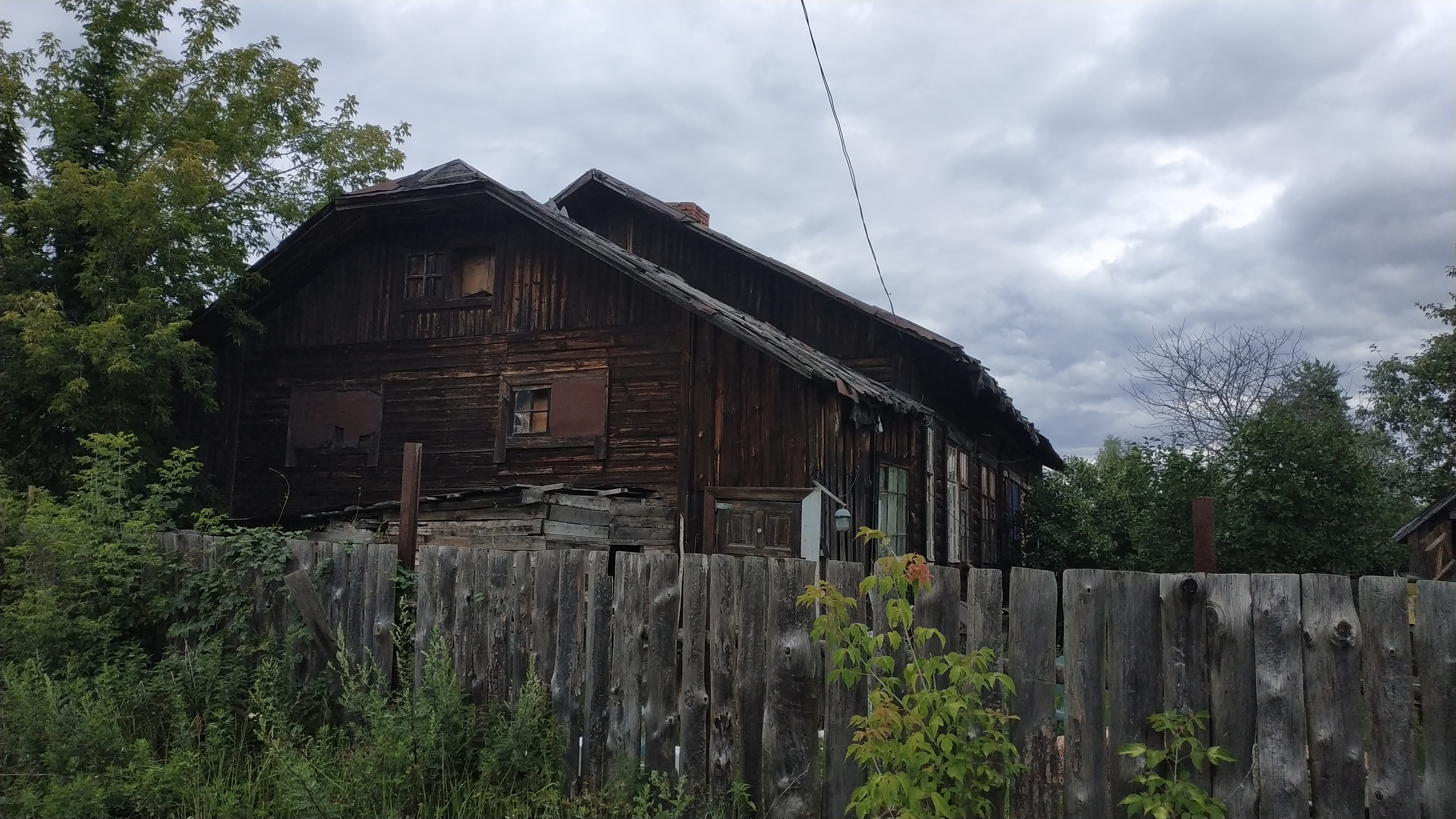

- Location within Moscow Oblast Location within Russia
- Coordinates: 55.541944°N 39.504167°E
- Country: Russia
- Region: Moscow Oblast
- District: Shatursky District
- Time zone: UTC+03:00

18 posyolok (Russian: 18 посёлок) is a rural locality (a settlement) in Shatura Urban Settlement of Shatursky District, Russia. The population was 52 as of 2010.

== Geography ==
18 posyolok is located 269 km northwest of Shatura (the district's administrative centre) by road.

== Streets ==
There are no streets with titles.
