= Altukhovo, Gololobovskoye Rural Settlement, Zaraysky District, Moscow Oblast =

Altukhovo Алтухово
- Village
- Interactive map of Altukhovo
- Location of Altukhovo Altukhovo (Moscow Oblast)
- Coordinates: 54°50′37″N 38°56′38″E
- Country: Russia
- Federal subject: Moscow Oblast

Population
  - Estimate (2008): 44 )

Municipal status
  - Municipal district: Zaraysky District
  - Rural settlement: Gololobovkoye Rural Settlement
- Time zone: UTC+3 (MSK)
- Postal code: 140612
- OKTMO ID: 46616408106

Altukhovo (Russian: Алтухово) is a rural locality (a village) in Zaraysky District of Moscow Oblast, Russia. It is located 9.5 kilometers (5.9 mi) north from Zaraysk near the Lukhovitsy-Zaraysk road.
