= 3rd Uchastok =

3rd Uchastok 3-й Участок
- Settlement
- Location within Moscow Oblast Location within Russia
- Coordinates: 56.156944°N 37.515278°E
- Country: Russia
- Region: Moscow Oblast
- District: Dmitrovsky District
- Time zone: UTC+03:00

3rd Uchastok (Russian: 3-й Уча́сток) is a rural locality (a settlement) in Dmitrov Urban Settlement of Dmitrovsky District, Russia. The population was 0 as of 2010.

== Streets ==
- There are no streets with titles.

== Geography ==
3rd Uchastok is located 24 km south of Tulun (the district's administrative centre) by road. 4th Uchastok is the nearest rural locality.
