= Zyuzino, Moscow Oblast =

Village in Moscow Oblast, Russia

Coordinates: 55°40′42″N 38°07′13″E

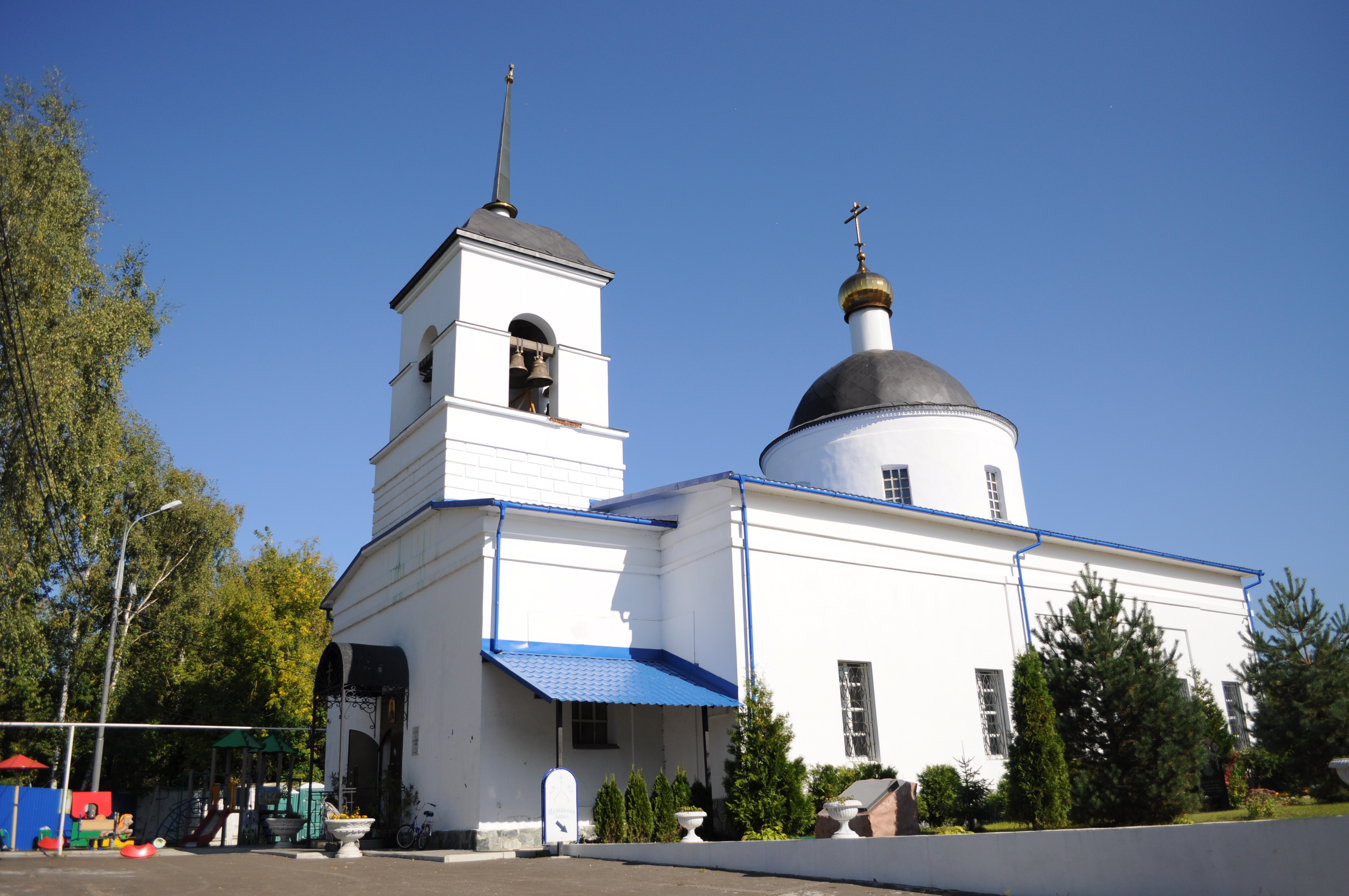
Church of the Nativity of the Virgin Mary. Founded 1836 at Zyuzino, Russia

Zyuzino (Russian: Зюзино) is a rural locality (a selo) in the Ramensky District in Moscow Oblast, Russia. Population: 1,036 (2010 census); 851 (2002 census);
