= Lyamtsino, Moscow Oblast =

Village in Domodedovsky District, Russia

Lyamtsino
- Village
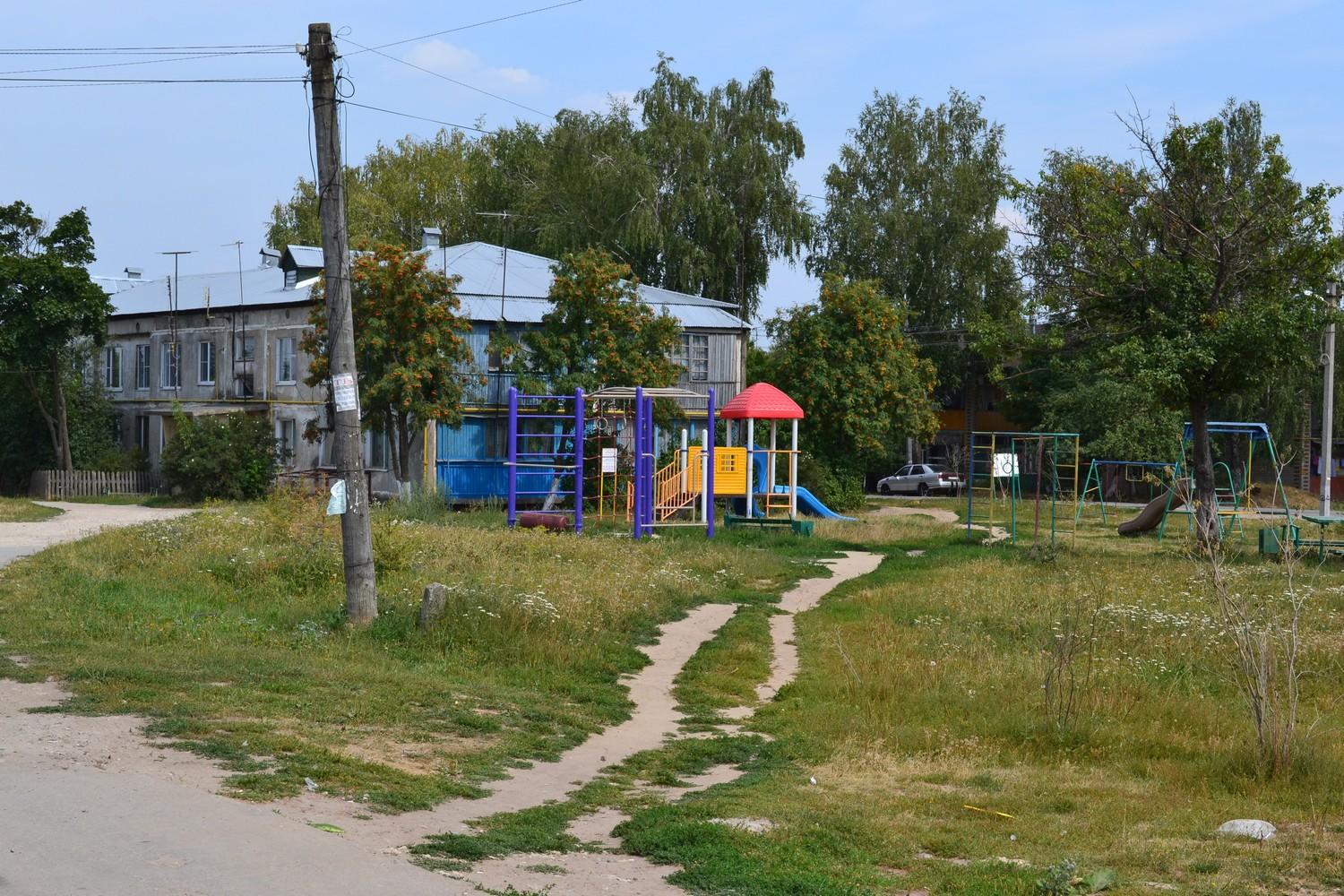
- A place in Lyamtsino
- Interactive map of Lyamtsino
- Location of Lyamtsino Lyamtsino (European Russia) Lyamtsino (Europe)
- Coordinates: 55°23′00″N 37°52′58″E
- Country: Russia
- Federal subject: Moscow Oblast

Population (2010 Census)
  - Total: 212
  - Estimate (2021): 353 (+66.5%)

Administrative status
  - Subordinated to: Domodedovo Town Under Oblast Jurisdiction

Municipal status
  - Urban okrug: Domodedovo Urban Okrug
- Time zone: UTC+3 (MSK)
- Postal code: 142033
- OKTMO ID: 46709000426

Lyamtsino (Russian: Лямцино) is a village in Domodedovo Urban Okrug in Moscow Oblast at about 3.5km southwest of the terminal of Domodedovo International Airport. Population (2005): 231 residents.

The main and only attraction is the Church of St. Nicholas, which existed already in 1534. The current building was built between 1790 and 1794.

The village lies on the ancient Bronnitsky-Podolsk road, in the general fields with small winding rivers. Recording service of minee Chudova monastery shows that the church of St. Nicholas in the village of Lyamtsino existed already in 1534. At that time, the village owned by Ivan Mikhailovich Semyonov, who bequeathed it to the spiritual literacy of Chudov Monastery.
