= Gololobovo, Zaraysky District, Moscow Oblast =

Gololobovo Гололобово
- Village
- Interactive map of Gololobovo
- Location of Gololobovo Gololobovo (Moscow Oblast)
- Coordinates: 54°45′51″N 38°55′08″E
- Country: Russia
- Federal subject: Moscow Oblast
- Administrative district: Zaraysky District
- Rural settlementSelsoviet: Gololobovskoye Rural Settlement

Population
  - Estimate (2005): 1,146 )

Administrative status
  - Capital of: Gololobovkoye Rural Settlement

Municipal status
  - Municipal district: Zaraysky Municipal District
  - Rural settlement: Gololobovkoye Rural Settlement
  - Capital of: Gololobovskoye Rural Settlement
- Time zone: UTC+3 (MSK)
- Postal code: 140600
- OKTMO ID: 46616408101

Gololobovo (Russian: Гололо́бово) is a rural locality (a village) in Zaraysky District of Moscow Oblast, Russia, located 2.5 kilometers (1.6 mi) east of Zaraysk, the administrative center of the district. The village is the administrative center of Gololobovkoye Rural Settlement of Zaraysky District.
