= Settlement on the 1st of May =

Settlement on the 1st of May Посёлок 1-го Мая
- settlement
- Location in Moscow Oblast
- Coordinates: 55.761°N 39.205°E
- Country: Russia
- Region: Moscow Oblast
- District: Orekhovo-Zuyevsky District
- Time zone: UTC+03:00 (CET)

Settlement on the 1st of May (Russian: Посёлок 1-го Мая) is a rural locality (a settlement) in Vereyskoye Rural Settlement of Orekhovo-Zuyevsky District, Russia. The population was 34 as of 2010. There are 53 streets in the settlement.

== Geography ==
The settlement is located 18 km southeast of Orekhovo-Zuyevo (the district's administrative centre) by road. Snopok Novy is the nearest rural locality.

== History ==
The settlement was formed for peat extraction in the 20th century. Until 2006, it was a part of Vereisky rural district of Orekhovo-Zuevsky district.
