= Razvilka, Moscow Oblast =

Rural locality in Leninsky District, Moscow Oblast, Russia

Coordinates: 55°35′27″N 37°44′44″E

Central part of the settlement

Razvilka (Russian: Разви́лка) is a rural locality (a settlement) in Leninsky District of Moscow Oblast, Russia, located in the "green forests and parks space" surrounding the city of Moscow, on the Kashira Highway. Population: 9,778 (2010 census); 8,773 (2002 census). Postal code: 142717. Telephone code: +7 495.

Razvilka was founded in 1947 as a settlement for employees of the Scientific Institute of Natural Gases (VNIIGAZ) and its experimental factory. Currently, enterprises of the natural gas industry are located in the settlement, which earned an unofficial name of the "gas capital of Russia".

The infrastructure of the settlement includes a clinic, pharmacies, a dental clinic, a secondary school, a college, kindergartens, a Russian Orthodox church, a church education centre, supermarkets, car-maintenance facilities, a fire depot, and a police department. The local cable TV station is KTV-Razvilka.

The settlement is connected with Moscow by five bus lines: #44 to railway station Rastorguyevo, #95, #355, #356 to Domodedovskaya station of the Moscow Metro, and #897 to Maryino metro station.

== Images ==
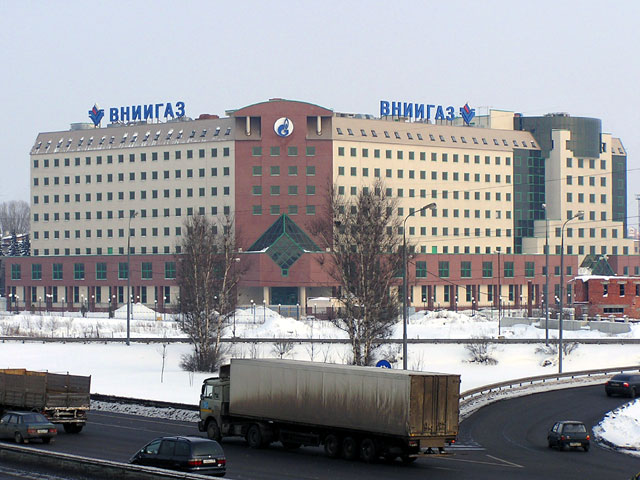
View of the VNIIGAZ building from the Moscow Ring Road

View of Razvilka from the Kashira Highway

Central part of the settlement, occupied by the 1970s Soviet-era residential buildings

Post office and bank

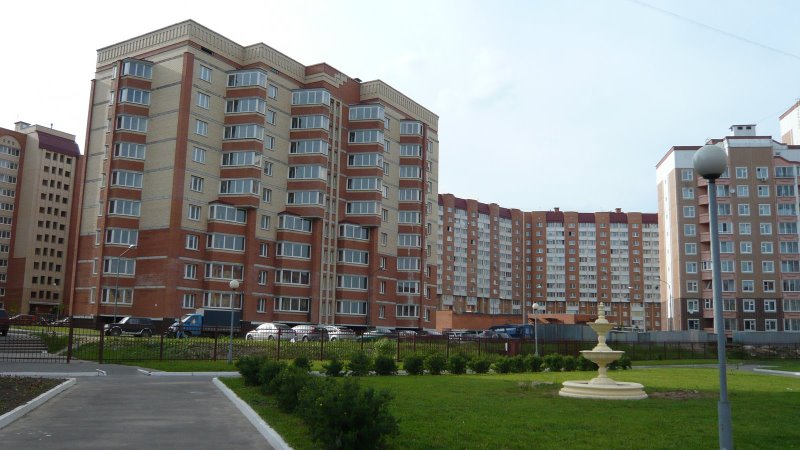
New residential buildings

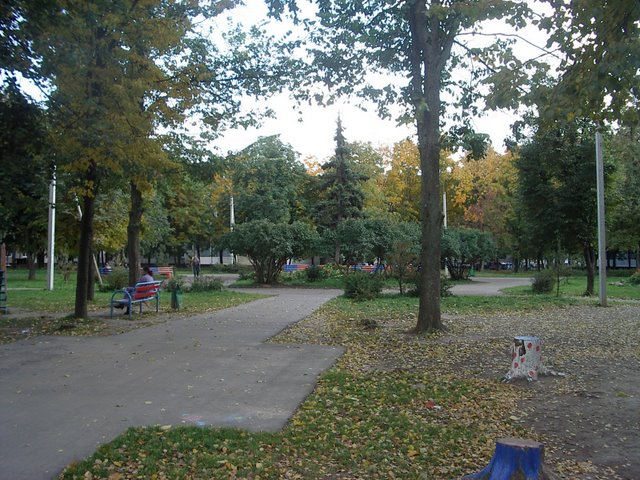
Old square

Supermarket
