= Shakhovskaya, Irkutsk Oblast =

Shakhovskaya Шаховская
- Village
- Location within Irkutsk Oblast Location within Russia
- Coordinates: 53°31′N 102°48′E
- Country: Russia
- Region: Irkutsk Oblast
- District: Alarsky District
- Time zone: UTC+8:00

Shakhovskaya (Russian: Шаховская) is a rural locality (a village) in Alarsky District, Irkutsk Oblast, Russia. Population: 132 (2010 census);

== Geography ==
This rural locality is located 20 kilometres (12 mi) from Kutulik (the district's administrative centre), 169 kilometres (105 mi) from Irkutsk (capital of Irkutsk Oblast) and 4,316 kilometres (2,682 mi) from Moscow. Makaryevskaya is the nearest rural locality.
