= 19 posyolok =

19 posyolok 19 посёлок
- Settlement
- Location within Moscow Oblast Location within Russia
- Coordinates: 55.538611°N 39.384167°E
- Country: Russia
- Region: Moscow Oblast
- District: Shatursky District
- Time zone: UTC+03:00

19 posyolok (Russian: 19 посёлок) is a rural locality (a settlement) in the Shatura Urban Settlement of Shatursky District, Russia. The population was 25 as of 2010.

== Geography ==
19 posyolok is located 269 km northwest of Shatura (the district's administrative centre) by road.

== Streets ==
There are no streets with titles.
