= Kolionovo =

Rural locality in Moscow Oblast, Russia

Coordinates: 55°18′N 39°27′E

Kolionovo (Russian: Колио́ново) is a rural locality (a village) in Yegoryevsky District of Moscow Oblast, Russia. As of the 2010 Census, its population was 150.

== Geography ==
The village is located at the end of a dead-end road about 125 kilometers (78 mi) away from Moscow.

== History ==
The village was first mentioned in 1577 as Kalinovo (Калиново)—a name derived from the personal name Kalina. In the second half of the 18th century, the name distorted into Kalivonovo (Каливоново), then into Kolivonovo (Коливоново), and finally into its present form.

== Notable residents ==
- Mikhail Shlyapnikov
