= 2nd Biserovskiy uchastok =

2nd Biserovskiy uchastok 2-й Бисеровский участок
- Settlement
- Location within Moscow Oblast Location within Russia
- Coordinates: 55.769167°N 38.148611°E
- Country: Russia
- Region: Moscow Oblast
- District: Noginsky District
- Time zone: UTC+03:00

2nd Biserovskiy uchastok (Russian: 2-й Би́серовский уча́сток) is a rural locality (a settlement) in Elektrougli Urban Settlement of Noginsky District, Russia. The population was 64 as of 2010.

== Geography ==
The settlement is located 29 km southwest of Noginsk (the district's administrative centre) by road. Biserovo is the nearest rural locality.

== Streets ==
- Rabochaya
- Sadovaya
- Tsentralnaya
