= Posyolok abonentnogo yaschika 001 =

Posyolok abonentnogo yaschika 001 Посёлок абонентного ящика 001
- Settlement
- Location within Moscow Oblast Location within Russia
- Coordinates: 55°41′N 37°18′E
- Country: Russia
- Region: Moscow Oblast
- District: Odintsovsky District
- Time zone: [[UTC+3:00]]

Posyolok abonentnogo yaschika 001 (Russian: Посёлок абонентного ящика 001) is a rural locality (a settlement) in Odintsovo Urban Settlement of Odintsovsky District, Moscow Oblast, Russia. The population was 27 as of 2010.

== Geography ==
The settlement is located 4 km east of Odintsovo (the district's administrative centre) by road. Glazynino is the nearest rural locality.
