= Abushkovo =

Abushkovo Абушково
- Village
- Location within Moscow Oblast Location within Russia
- Coordinates: 56°16′N 35°31′E
- Country: Russia
- Region: Moscow Oblast
- District: Lotoshinsky District
- Time zone: UTC+5:00

Abushkovo (Russian: Абушково) is a rural locality (a village) in Lotoshino Urban Settlement of Lotoshinsky District, Moscow Oblast, Russia. The population was 1 as of 2010.

== Geography ==
The village is located on the left bank of the Russa River, 11 km (6.8 mi) northwest of Lotoshino (the district's administrative centre) by road. Kalitsino is the nearest rural locality.
