= Baksheevo =

Rural locality in Shatursky District, Moscow Oblast, Russia

Coordinates: 55.712°N 39.874°E

Baksheevo (Бакшеево) is a village in Russia near town of Roshal incorporated into the municipal okrug of Shatura district of Moscow Oblast. The population is 2296 people.

Backsheevo was founded as a village of peat harvesters for the Shatura Power Station. The village is walking distance from Lake Smerdyachye.
