= SNT Gradostroitel' =

SNT Gradostroitel (Russian: СНТ Градостроитель) is the private cottage village (dacha) located nearby Nikolina Gora 25 km north west to Moscow in Moscow Oblast, Russia. Population: 250

== History ==
The community has existed since the second part of the 20th century, and was established back in 1968. The village's name is based on a Russian word "Gradostroitel" (architect, urban planner); First settlers were architects, developers and military people. Major renovations started in 1994 when an asphalt road was created from Nikolina Gora straight to the village.

In the beginning of the 2000s water pipes & electricity systems have been replaced with new systems. A new gas system had been deployed in the village for selected households enabling permanent living in both winter months as well as in summer months. With landlines connected to several houses Internet access became available to the Gradostroitel citizens.

== Geography ==
Gradostroitel' is bordered by Nikolina Gora to the south and SNT Lira to the north. Unincorporated federal woods area lies to the west and east.

Gradostroitel' is located at 55°45′17″N 37°02′40″E.

== Government and politics ==
Gradostroitel' has a non-partisan chairman-board form of government, with the chairman and several board members elected at large for staggered two-year terms.

=== Revision Committee ===
Revision Committee is a group usually consisting of 3 village members (with voting rights) who are reporting only to the group of all members of the village, known as "Assembly" Russian: Общее собрание. Its role is to make an independent review of all activities made by the Board and chairman and report on any issues and problems found back to the Assembly.

== Demographics ==
As of the census of 2011, there were 250+ people, 134 households, and 134+ families residing in the village.

== Real estate ==
Since mid-1990s nearly 50 properties sold in the Gradostroitel'.

At the end of the 20th century a clean property (with infrastructure available at the border of the property) was starting at $20,000 (end of the 1990s); in the next ten years lots of properties have been sold and new cottages (ready for permanent living) have been built; there are currently 2 or 3 properties at sale with approximate price of $400,000-$500,000. Prices are historically high due to not only a small distance to the Moscow city (25 km), but to close proximity to Nikolina Gora and the well-known Rublevo-Uspenskoe highway. A renovated infrastructure, including electricity, water (available during autumn, winter & spring months in addition to summer months), and gas, as well as the woods surrounding the village made the property cost relatively high.
