= Muranovo (village) =

Muranovo Мураново
- Village
- Location in Moscow Oblast
- Coordinates: 56°10′38″N 37°54′30″E
- Country: Russia
- Federal subject: Moscow Oblast
- Raion: Pushkinsky

Area
  - Total: 0.38 km^{2} (0.15 sq mi)

Population (2010)
  - Total: 224
  - Density: 590/km^{2} (1,500/sq mi)

Muranovo (Russian: Мураново) is a village in the Pushkinsky District, Moscow Oblast, Russia. Muranovo lies along the main road 46K–8140 and it has 11 roads in its area boundaries. Muranovo also has a church, a cafe, a park, a museum, a farm shop and a fishmonger. The memorial museum in Muranovo was created by the descendants of Fyodor Tyutchev on the basis of a family estate but in 1816, the village and consequently, the museum was acquired by Christoph von Engelhardt and his family. The museum was set on fire by a lightning strike in July 2006, but almost all its exhibits were restored, and the museum was declared open to the public again on August 1, 2015.
