= Abramtsevo, Vologda Oblast =

Abramtsevo Абрамцево
- Village
- Location within Vologda Oblast Location within Russia
- Coordinates: 59°10′N 39°49′E
- Country: Russia
- Region: Vologda Oblast
- District: Vologodsky District
- Time zone: UTC+3:00

Abramtsevo (Russian: Абрамцево) is a rural locality (a village) in Spasskoye Rural Settlement of Vologodsky District, Vologda Oblast, Russia. The population was 7 as of 2002. There are 4 streets.

== Geography ==
Abramtsevo is located 8 km southwest of Vologda (the district's administrative centre) by road. Yaskino is the nearest rural locality.
