= Shakhovsky (surname) =

Shakhovsky (Russian: Шаховский, masculine) or Shakhovskaya (Шаховская, feminine) is a Russian surname that may refer to

- Evgeniya Shakhovskaya (1889–1920), Russian pilot
- Natalia Shakhovskaya (1935–2017), Russian cellist
