= Verkhneye Myachkovo =

Verkhneye Myachkovo Верхнее Мячково
- Selo
- Interactive map of Verkhneye Myachkovo
- Location of Verkhneye Myachkovo Verkhneye Myachkovo (Moscow Oblast)
- Coordinates: 55°32′54″N 37°58′46″E
- Country: Russia
- Federal subject: Moscow Oblast
- Administrative district: Ramensky District
- First mentioned: 1453

Population (2010 Census)
  - Total: 618
  - Estimate (2010): 618 (0%)
- Time zone: UTC+3 (MSK)
- Postal code: 140123
- OKTMO ID: 46648461106

Verkhneye Myachkovo (Russian: Верхнее Мячково) is a rural locality (a selo) in Ramensky District, Moscow Oblast, Russia. Population: 618 inhabitants (2010). The distance to the town of Ramenskoye (the district's administrative centre) is about 20 km and the distance to Moscow is about 22 km.

== Population ==
1926	2002	2010
1380	401	618
