= Buzhaninovo =

Buzhaninovo Бужаниново
- Interactive map of Buzhaninovo
- Location of Buzhaninovo Buzhaninovo (Moscow Oblast)
- Coordinates: 56°23′45″N 38°17′54″E
- Country: Russia
- Federal subject: Moscow Oblast
- Founded: 1543

Population
  - Estimate (2002): 1,829
- Time zone: UTC+3 (MSK)
- Postal code: 141326
- Dialing code: +7 (496)
- OKTMO ID: 46615406121

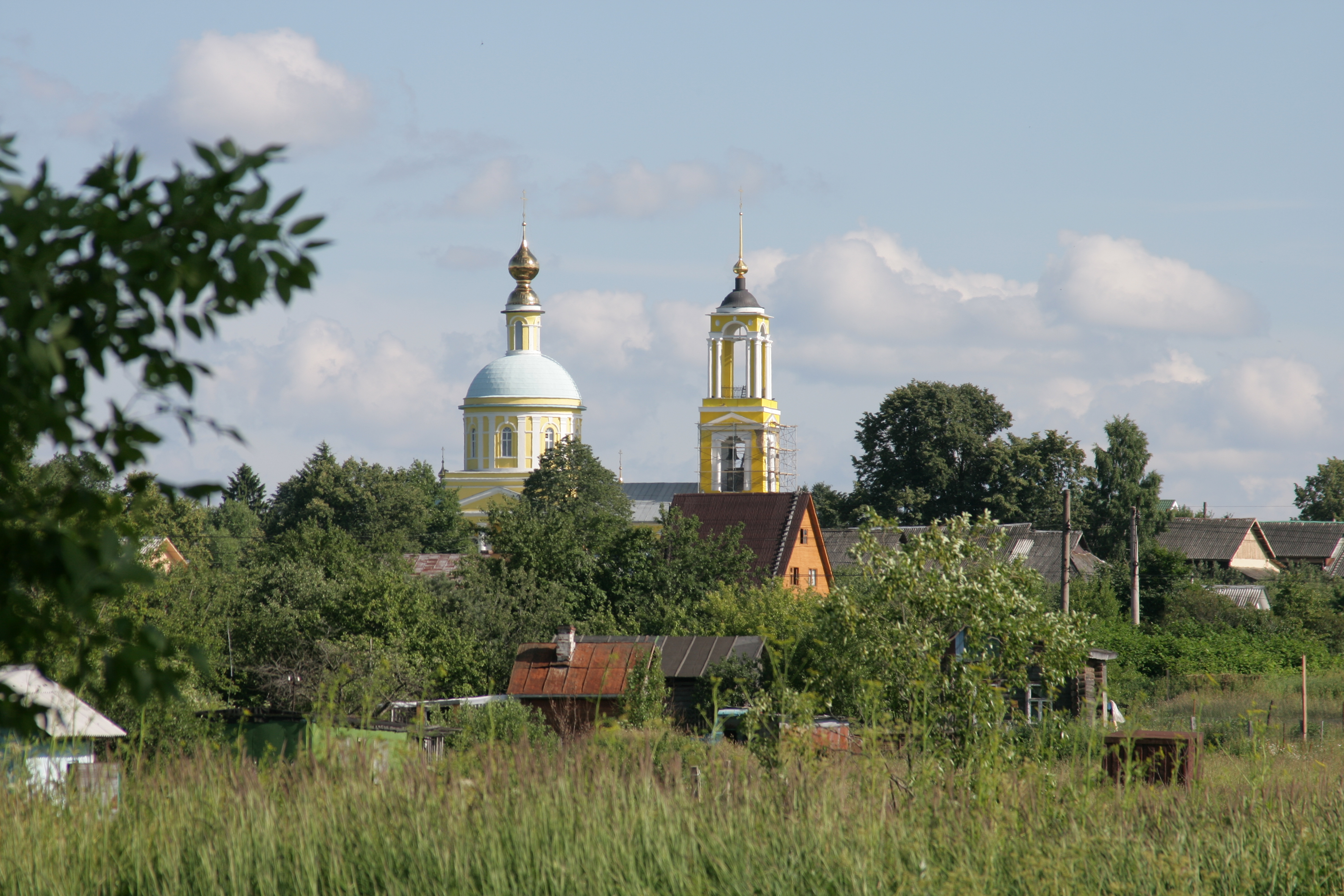
view at St.Nicholas church

Buzhaninovo is a village in the Sergiyevo-Posadskiy district, Moscow region. In the 16th century, these lands were possessed by the Holy Trinity Monastery (located some 20 km to the south-west). The village has a hospital, a secondary school, a kindergarten, an orphanage, and some small stores. Regular buses and shuttles connect the village with Sergiyev Posad and smaller neighboring destinations. Buzhaninovo railway station is a stop between Moscow and Alexandrov. The area has no heavy industry.The urban part of the village, around the railway station, features the concrete low-rise block-houses and warehouses, while the rest is occupied by the woodwork village houses, summer cottages and farms. The surrounding area is covered with mixed forests and farm fields. St.Nicholas church is a major landmark.
