= Abryutkovo =

Abryutkovo Абрютково
- Village
- Location within Moscow Oblast Location within Russia
- Coordinates: 55°22′N 39°08′E
- Country: Russia
- Region: Moscow Oblast
- District: Yegoryevsky District
- Time zone: UTC+3:00

Abryutkovo (Russian: Абрютково) is a rural locality (a village) in Yegoryevsk Urban Settlement of Yegoryevsky District, Moscow Oblast, Russia. The population was 2 as of 2010.

== Geography ==
Abryutkovo is located 9 km east of Yegoryevsk (the district's administrative centre) by road. Akatovo is the nearest rural locality.

== Ethnicity ==
The village is inhabited by Russians.
