= Dmitrovsky District =

Location of Moscow in Russia

Location of Moscow Oblast in Russia

Location of Oryol Oblast in Russia

Dmitrovsky District is the name of several administrative and municipal districts in Russia. The districts' name generally derives from or is related to the male first name Dmitry.

- Dmitrovsky District, Moscow, a district in Northern Administrative Okrug of Moscow
- Dmitrovsky District, Moscow Oblast, an administrative and municipal district of Moscow Oblast
- Dmitrovsky District, Oryol Oblast, an administrative and municipal district of Oryol Oblast

== See also ==
- Dmitrovsky (disambiguation)
- Dmitriyevsky District
