= Gzhelskogo kirpichnogo zavoda =

Rural locality in Ramensky District, Moscow Oblast, Russia

Coordinates: 55°36′52″N 38°25′26″E

Gzhelskogo kirpichnogo zavoda (Russian: Гже́льского кирпи́чного заво́да) is a rural locality (a settlement) in Ramensky District of Moscow Oblast, Russia.
