= Chepelyovo, Moscow Oblast =

Chepelyovo Чепелёво
- Rural locality
- Interactive map of Chepelyovo
- Location of Chepelyovo Chepelyovo (Moscow Oblast)
- Coordinates: 55.1791°N 37.4841°E
- Country: Russia
- Federal subject: Moscow Oblast
- Administrative district: Chekhovsky District

Population
  - Estimate (2010): 594 )
- Time zone: UTC+3 (MSK)
- Postal codes: 142300, 142301
- OKTMO ID: 46656428471

Chepelyovo (Russian: Чепелёво) is a rural locality (a village) in Stremilovskoye Rural Settlement of Chekhovsky District, Moscow Oblast, Russia, situated along the Old Simferopolskoye highway, about 4 kilometers (2.5 mi) from the town of Chekhov 46 kilometers (29 mi) from Moscow's MKAD. The railroad platform also called Chepelyovo is situated to the southwest of the village.

There is a large summer colony in the vicinity which was originally created by gardening fans working for the Soviet Ministry of Interior (over 1000 land plots) and which in summer month substantially exceeds the village itself in population.
