= Alyoshino, Yegoryevsky District, Moscow Oblast =

Alyoshino Алёшино
- Selo
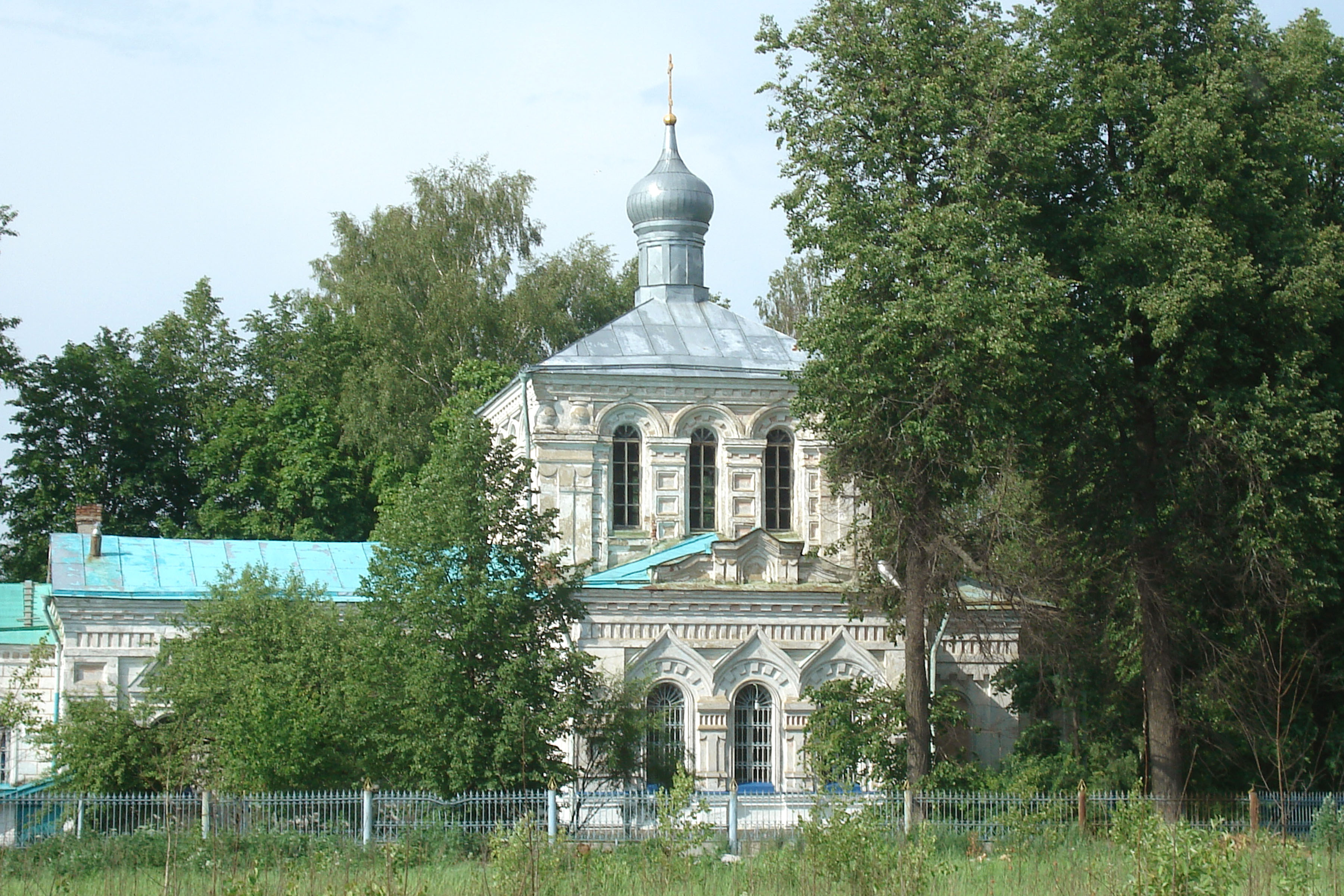
- Old Believers' Saint George church in Alyoshino. 1886.
- Interactive map of Alyoshino
- Location of Alyoshino Alyoshino (Moscow Oblast)
- Coordinates: 55°25.875′N 38°0.75′E
- Country: Russia
- Federal subject: Moscow Oblast
- Administrative district: Yegoryevsky District

Population
  - Estimate (2010): 82 )
- Time zone: UTC+3 (MSK)
- Postal codes: 140341, 140320
- OKTMO ID: 46722000121

Alyoshino (Russian: Алёшино) is a rural locality (a selo) in Yegoryevsky District of Moscow Oblast, Russia.

In the Russian Empire, it was a part of Nechayevskaya Volost of Yegoryevsky Uyezd of Ryazan Governorate. Postal code: 140320.

Old Believers' (Russian Orthodox Old-Rite Church) Saint George church in Alyoshino was built in 1886–1889 with the Yegoryevsk's city head and the manufacturer Nikifor Bardygin's own money.

On October 24, 2004, sanctified by the decision of the Council of Russian Orthodox Old-Rite Church, Monastery of the Signs of Our Lady was opened in Alyoshino.
