= Abramtsevo (selo), Dmitrovsky District, Moscow Oblast =

Abramtsevo Абрамцево
- Selo
- Location within Moscow Oblast Location within Russia
- Coordinates: 56°24′N 37°11′E
- Country: Russia
- Region: Moscow Oblast
- District: Dmitrovsky District
- Time zone: UTC+3:00

Abramtsevo (Russian: Абра́мцево) is a rural locality (a selo) in Sinkovskoye Rural Settlement of Dmitrovsky District, Moscow Oblast, Russia. The population was 51 as of 2010.

== Geography ==
Abramtsevo is located 21 km northwest of Dmitrov (the district's administrative centre) by road. Bunyatino is the nearest rural locality.
