= Krasnogorsky District, Moscow Oblast =

Krasnogorsky District Красногорский район (Russian)
- District
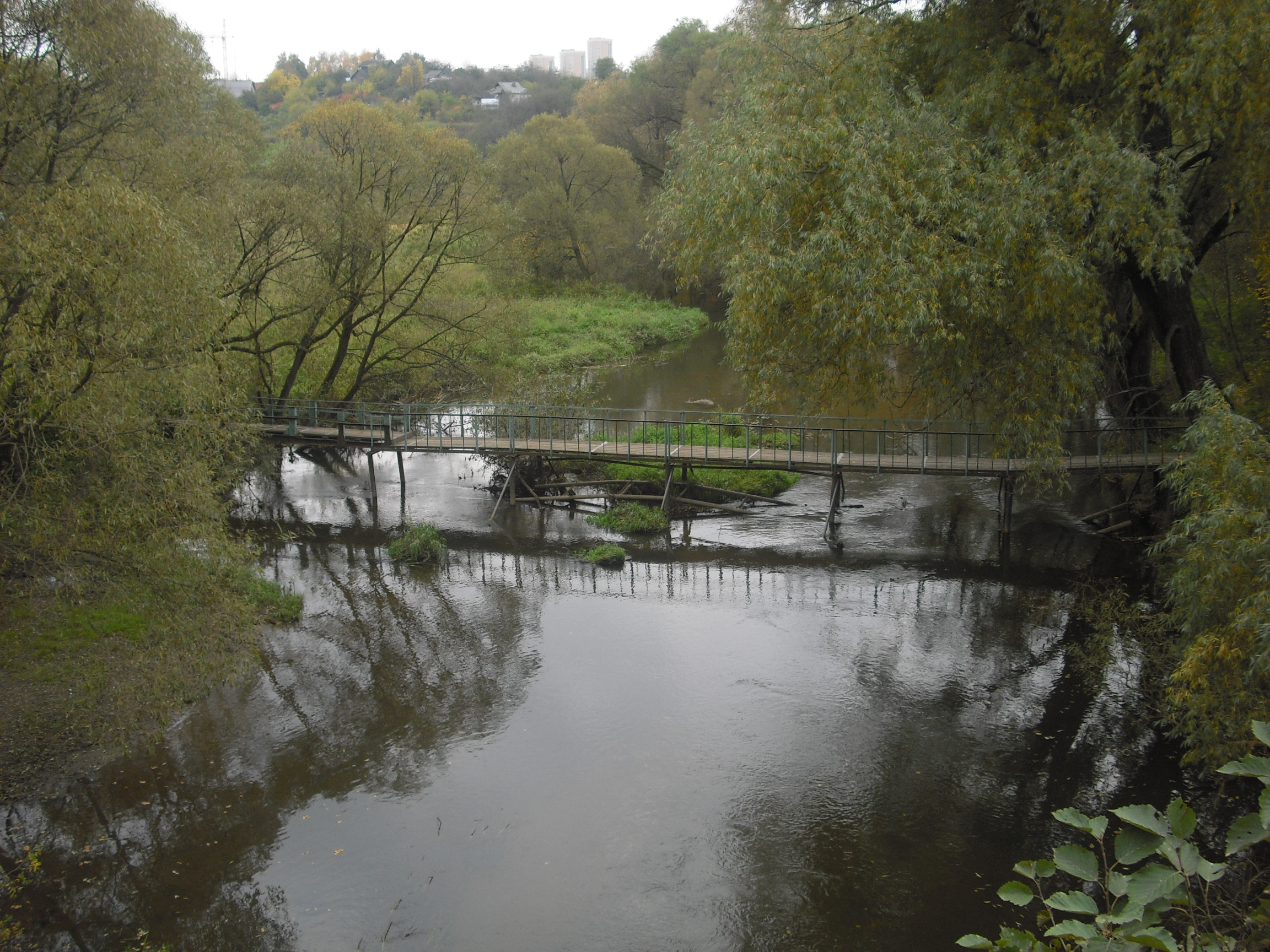
- The Skhodnya River near the village of Putilkovo in Krasnogorsky District

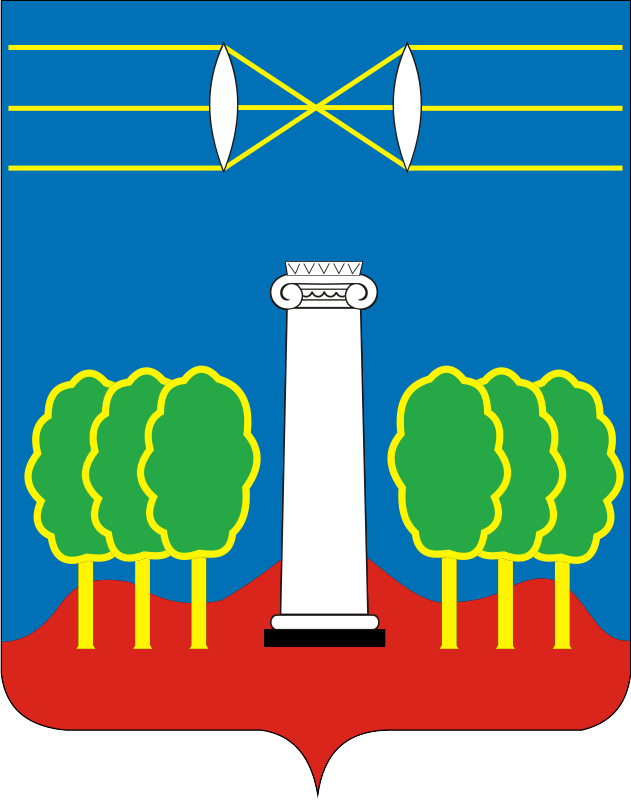
- Flag Coat of arms
- Location of Krasnogorsky District in Moscow Oblast (before July 2012)
- Coordinates: 55°49′N 37°20′E
- Country: Russia
- Federal subject: Moscow Oblast
- Established: January 2017
- Administrative center: Krasnogorsk

Area
  - Total: 224.99 km^{2} (86.87 sq mi)

Population (2010 Census)
  - Total: 179,872
  - Density: 799.47/km^{2} (2,070.6/sq mi)
  - Urban: 85.3%
  - Rural: 14.7%

Administrative structure
  - Administrative divisions: 1 Towns, 1 Work settlements, 2 Rural settlements
  - Inhabited localities: 1 cities/towns, 1 urban-type settlements, 35 rural localities

Municipal structure
  - Municipally incorporated as: Krasnogorsky Municipal District
  - Municipal divisions: 2 urban settlements, 2 rural settlements
- Time zone: UTC+3 (MSK)
- OKTMO ID: 46744
- Website: http://www.krasnogorsk-adm.ru/

Krasnogorsky District (Russian: Красного́рский райо́н) is an administrative and municipal district (raion), one of the thirty-six in Moscow Oblast, Russia. It is located in the center of the oblast. The area of the district is 224.99 square kilometers (86.87 sq mi). Its administrative center is the city of Krasnogorsk. Population: 179,872 (2010 census); 149,679 (2002 Census); 51,823 (1989 Soviet census). The population of Krasnogorsk accounts for 65.0% of the district's total population.

== Education ==
International School of Moscow maintains its Rosinka Campus in Rosinka, in the district.
