= Stupinsky District =

Stupinsky District Ступинский район (Russian)
- District
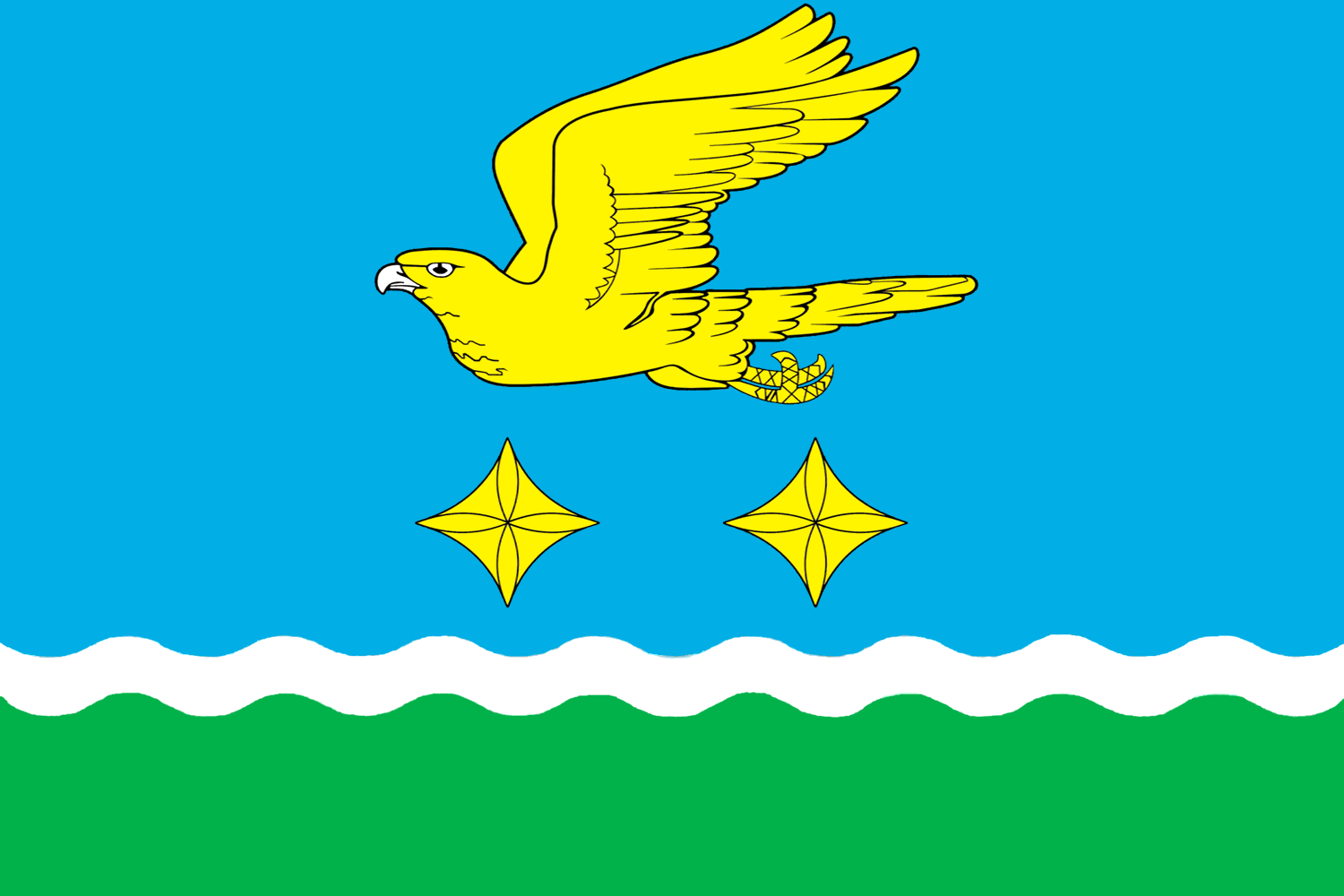
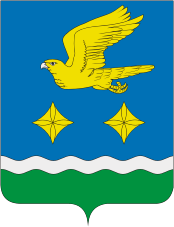
- Flag Coat of arms
- Location of Stupinsky District in Moscow Oblast (before 2012-07)
- Coordinates: 54°53′N 38°04′E
- Country: Russia
- Federal subject: Moscow Oblast
- Administrative center: Stupino

Area
  - Total: 1,707.73 km^{2} (659.36 sq mi)

Population (2010 Census)
  - Total: 119,282
  - Density: 69.8483/km^{2} (180.906/sq mi)
  - Urban: 71.0%
  - Rural: 29.0%

Administrative structure
  - Administrative divisions: 1 Towns, 3 Work settlements, 3 Rural settlements
  - Inhabited localities: 1 cities/towns, 3 urban-type settlements, 234 rural localities

Municipal structure
  - Municipally incorporated as: Stupinsky Municipal District
  - Municipal divisions: 4 urban settlements, 3 rural settlements
- Time zone: UTC+3 (MSK)
- OKTMO ID: 46653000
- Website: http://stupino.stinline.ru/

Stupinsky District (Russian: Сту́пинский райо́н) is an administrative and municipal district (raion), one of the thirty-six in Moscow Oblast, Russia. It is located in the south of the oblast. The area of the district is 1,707.73 square kilometers (659.36 sq mi). Its administrative center is the town of Stupino. Population: 119,282 (2010 Census); 116,007 (2002 census); 49,439 (1989 Soviet census). The population of Stupino accounts for 56.0% of the district's total population.

As of 2016, the district had the fourth lowest crime rate in Moscow Oblast, behind Baikonur, Vlasikha, and Dubna.
