= Zaraysky District =

Zaraysky District Зарайский район (Russian)
- District
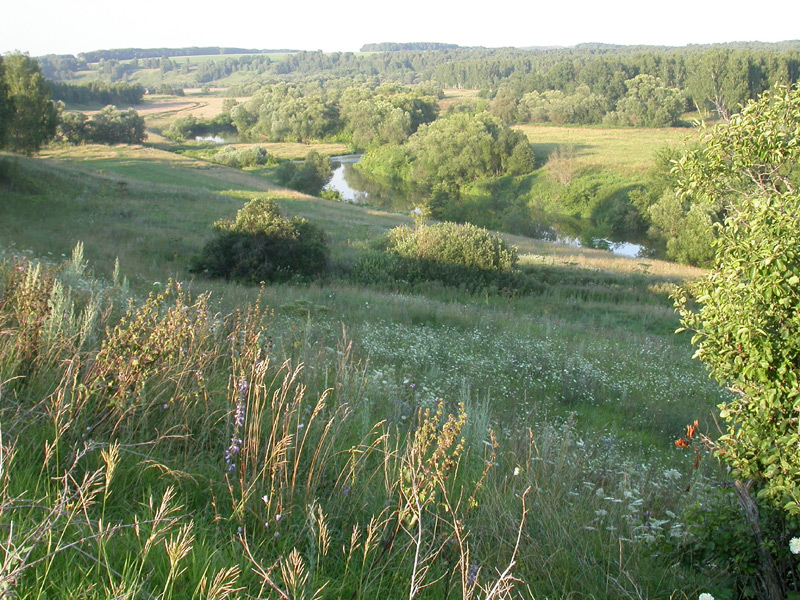
- The Osyotr River valley in Zaraysky District

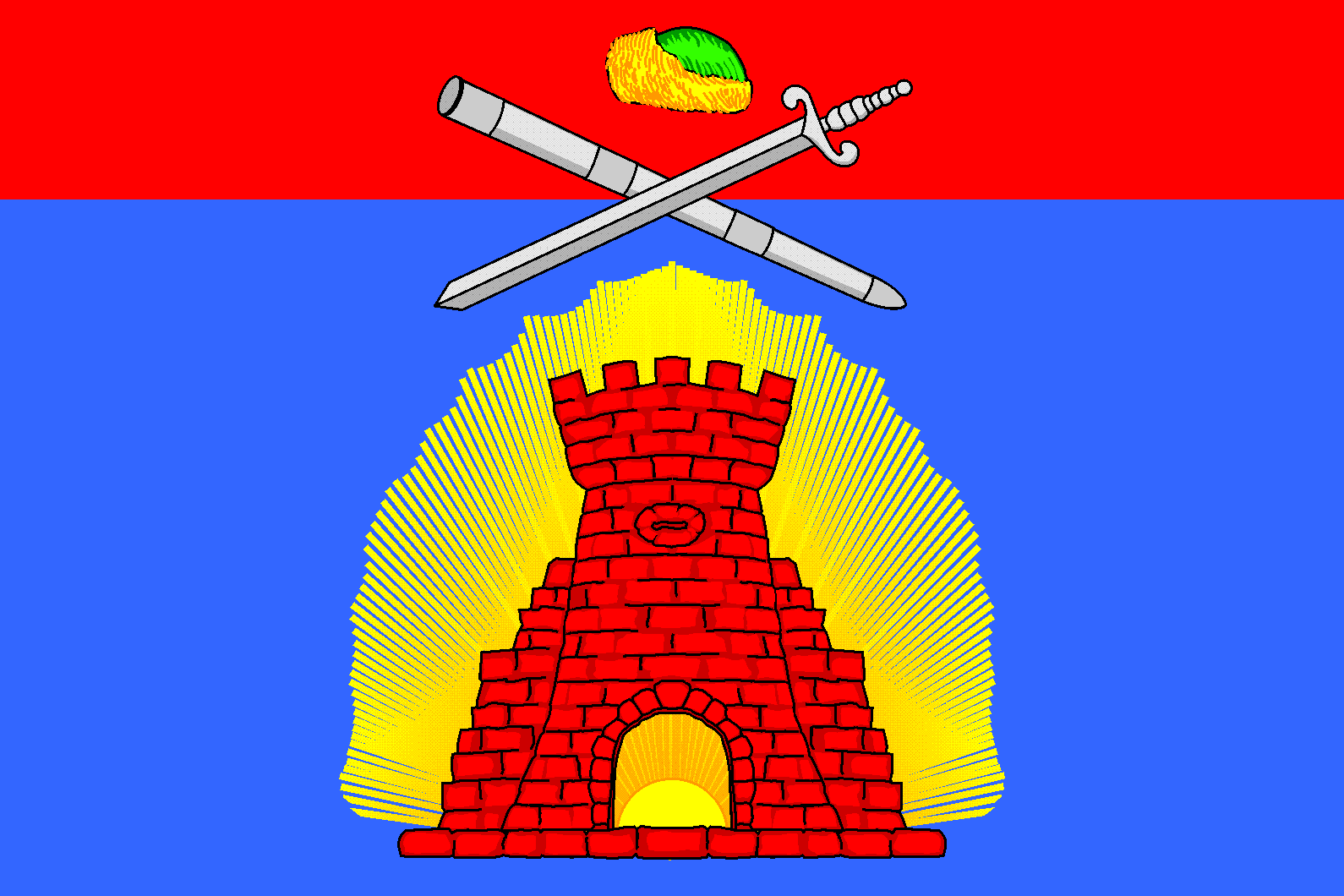
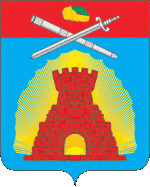
- Flag Coat of arms
- Location of Zaraysky District in Moscow Oblast (before July 2012)
- Coordinates: 54°46′N 38°53′E
- Country: Russia
- Federal subject: Moscow Oblast
- Administrative center: Zaraysk

Area
  - Total: 967.68 km^{2} (373.62 sq mi)

Population (2010 Census)
  - Total: 41,912
  - Density: 43.312/km^{2} (112.18/sq mi)
  - Urban: 58.8%
  - Rural: 41.2%

Administrative structure
  - Administrative divisions: 1 Towns, 4 Rural settlements
  - Inhabited localities: 1 cities/towns, 124 rural localities

Municipal structure
  - Municipally incorporated as: Zaraysky Municipal District
  - Municipal divisions: 1 urban settlements, 4 rural settlements
- Time zone: UTC+3 (MSK)
- OKTMO ID: 46616000
- Website: http://www.zaraysk.com/

Zaraysky District (Russian: Зара́йский райо́н) is an administrative and municipal district (raion), one of the thirty-six in Moscow Oblast, Russia. It is located in the southeast of the oblast. The area of the district is 967.68 square kilometers (373.62 sq mi). Its administrative center is the town of Zaraysk. Population: 41,912 (2010 Census); 41,974 (2002 census); 18,104 (1989 Soviet census). The population of Zaraysk accounts for 58.8% of the district's total population.

== See also ==
- List of rural localities in Moscow Oblast
