= Razdolyevskoye Rural Settlement, Kolchuginsky District =

Razdolyevskoye Rural Settlement Раздольевское сельское поселение
- Interactive map of Razdolyevskoye Rural Settlement
- Location of Razdolyevskoye Rural Settlement Razdolyevskoye Rural Settlement (Vladimir Oblast)
- Coordinates: 56°16′19″N 39°27′27″E
- Country: Russia
- Federal subject: Vladimir Oblast
- Administrative district: Kolchuginsky District
- Founded: 16 May 2005

Government
  - Глава сельского поселения: Елена Владимировна Лебедева

Area
  - Total: 520.19 km^{2} (200.85 sq mi)

Population
  - Estimate (2021): 3,143 )
- Time zone: UTC+3 (MSK)
- OKTMO ID: 17640442
- Website: www.admrazdolye.ru

Razdolyevskoye Rural Settlement (Russian: Раздольевское сельское поселение) is a selskoye poseleniye in Kolchuginsky District, Vladimir Oblast, Russia, containing 67 inhabited localities. Its administrative center is the posyolok Razdolye.

== Location ==
The settlement is located in the southern part of the district, and encompasses 44.46% of its land area.

== History ==
Razdolyevskoye selsoviet was established in 1984 out of inhabited places from the abolished Белореченского selsoviet.

Razdolyevskoye Rural Settlement was formed on 16 May 2005 in accordance with Vladimir Oblast law no. 64-ОЗ. In it were included the territories of the former Ельцинского, Завалинского, Павловского and Раздольевского selsoviets.

== Population ==
Number of people
2010	2011	2012	2013	2014	2015	2016	2017	2018
3064	↘3044	↘2977	↘2960	↘2902	↘2872	↘2810	↘2772	↘2747
2019	2020	2021
↗2771	↘2699	↗3143

== Composition ==
Inhabited locality	Type of inhabited locality	Population	Location
Avdotyino	derevnya		
Bakinets	derevnya		
Baranovka	derevnya		
Beryozovaya Roshcha	derevnya		
Berechino	selo		
Bolshoye Grigorovo	derevnya		
Бусино	derevnya		
Vaulovo	selo		
Вишнёвый	posyolok		
Vorontsovo	derevnya		
Voskresenskoye	selo		
Gorbatovka	derevnya		
Городец	derevnya		
Гриденка	derevnya		
Демлево	derevnya		
Dubki (ru)	posyolok	146 (2010)	56°13′N 39°32′E
Dubki (ru)	selo	104 (2010)	56°13′N 39°32′E
Yeltsino	selo		
Zhuravlikha	derevnya		
Zavalino	selo		
Zapazhye	derevnya		
Zinovyevo	selo		
Kashino	derevnya		
Klementyevo	derevnya		
Konyshevo	derevnya		
Korobovshchina	selo		
Korobovshchinsky	posyolok		
Koskovka	derevnya		
Kudryavtsevo	derevnya		
Lavrenikha	derevnya		
Лаврово	derevnya		
Marino	derevnya		
Марково	derevnya		
Miklyaikha	derevnya		
Мильтино	derevnya		
Некрасовка	derevnya		
Nikolayevka	derevnya		
Новая	derevnya		
Новая	derevnya		
Novino	derevnya		
Novosyolka	derevnya		
Novofetinino	derevnya		
Novofrolovskoye	derevnya		
Pavlovka	derevnya		
Paddubki	derevnya		
Panteleyevo	derevnya		
Pozdnyakovo	derevnya		
Покровка	derevnya		
Polyany	derevnya		
Razdolye	posyolok		
Safonovo	derevnya		
Святково	selo		
Skorodumka	derevnya		
Скрябино	derevnya		
Slugino	derevnya		
Snegiryovo	selo		
Sobino	derevnya		
Stenki	derevnya		
Sukmanikha	derevnya		
Танеево	derevnya		
Toporishchevo	derevnya		
Troitsa	derevnya		
Тюхтово	derevnya		
Ulyanikha	derevnya		
Хламостово	derevnya		
Shustino	derevnya		
Yakovlevo	derevnya		
