= Vorontsovo =

Vorontsovo (Russian: Воронцово) is the name of several rural localities in Russia.

== Arkhangelsk Oblast ==
As of 2010, one rural locality in Arkhangelsk Oblast bears this name:

- Vorontsovo, Arkhangelsk Oblast, a village in Ilyinsky Selsoviet of Vilegodsky District

== Ivanovo Oblast ==
As of 2010, five rural localities in Ivanovo Oblast bear this name:

- Vorontsovo, Ilyinsky District, Ivanovo Oblast, a village in Ilyinsky District
- Vorontsovo, Komsomolsky District, Ivanovo Oblast, a village in Komsomolsky District
- Vorontsovo, Puchezhsky District, Ivanovo Oblast, a selo in Puchezhsky District
- Vorontsovo, Rodnikovsky District, Ivanovo Oblast, a selo in Rodnikovsky District
- Vorontsovo, Zavolzhsky District, Ivanovo Oblast, a village in Zavolzhsky District

== Kaluga Oblast ==
As of 2010, two rural localities in Kaluga Oblast bear this name:

- Vorontsovo, Kuybyshevsky District, Kaluga Oblast, a village in Kuybyshevsky District
- Vorontsovo, Meshchovsky District, Kaluga Oblast, a village in Meshchovsky District

== Kostroma Oblast ==
As of 2010, two rural localities in Kostroma Oblast bear this name:

- Vorontsovo, Chukhlomskoye Settlement, Chukhlomsky District, Kostroma Oblast, a village in Chukhlomskoye Settlement of Chukhlomsky District
- Vorontsovo, Petrovskoye Settlement, Chukhlomsky District, Kostroma Oblast, a village in Petrovskoye Settlement of Chukhlomsky District

== Krasnoyarsk Krai ==
As of 2010, one rural locality in Krasnoyarsk Krai bears this name:

- Vorontsovo, Krasnoyarsk Krai, a settlement in Taymyrsky Dolgano-Nenetsky District

== Kursk Oblast ==
As of 2010, one rural locality in Kursk Oblast bears this name:

- Vorontsovo, Kursk Oblast, a village in Besedinsky Selsoviet of Kursky District

== Moscow Oblast ==
As of 2010, three rural localities in Moscow Oblast bear this name:

- Vorontsovo, Borodinskoye Rural Settlement, Mozhaysky District, Moscow Oblast, a village in Borodinskoye Rural Settlement of Mozhaysky District
- Vorontsovo, Klementyevskoye Rural Settlement, Mozhaysky District, Moscow Oblast, a village in Klementyevskoye Rural Settlement of Mozhaysky District
- Vorontsovo, Sergiyevo-Posadsky District, Moscow Oblast, a village under the administrative jurisdiction of the City of Sergiyev Posad in Sergiyevo-Posadsky District

== Nizhny Novgorod Oblast ==
As of 2010, three rural localities in Nizhny Novgorod Oblast bear this name:

- Vorontsovo, Bogorodsky District, Nizhny Novgorod Oblast, a village in Aleshkovsky Selsoviet of Bogorodsky District
- Vorontsovo, Chkalovsky District, Nizhny Novgorod Oblast, a village in Purekhovsky Selsoviet of Chkalovsky District
- Vorontsovo, Gaginsky District, Nizhny Novgorod Oblast, a selo in Yuryevsky Selsoviet of Gaginsky District

== Novgorod Oblast ==
As of 2010, one rural locality in Novgorod Oblast bears this name:

- Vorontsovo, Novgorod Oblast, a village in Fedorkovskoye Settlement of Parfinsky District

== Oryol Oblast ==
As of 2010, two rural localities in Oryol Oblast bear this name:

- Vorontsovo, Shablykinsky District, Oryol Oblast, a selo in Molodovskoy Selsoviet of Shablykinsky District
- Vorontsovo, Uritsky District, Oryol Oblast, a settlement in Kotovsky Selsoviet of Uritsky District

== Pskov Oblast ==
As of 2010, four rural localities in Pskov Oblast bear this name:

- Vorontsovo, Loknyansky District, Pskov Oblast, a village in Loknyansky District
- Vorontsovo, Ostrovsky District, Pskov Oblast, a selo in Ostrovsky District
- Vorontsovo, Porkhovsky District, Pskov Oblast, a village in Porkhovsky District
- Vorontsovo, Sebezhsky District, Pskov Oblast, a village in Sebezhsky District

== Ryazan Oblast ==
As of 2010, one rural locality in Ryazan Oblast bears this name:

- Vorontsovo, Ryazan Oblast, a settlement in Solominsky Rural Okrug of Klepikovsky District

== Sakha Republic ==
As of 2010, one rural locality in the Sakha Republic bears this name:

- Vorontsovo, Sakha Republic, a selo in Yukagirsky Natsionalny Rural Okrug of Allaikhovsky District

== Smolensk Oblast ==
As of 2010, three rural localities in Smolensk Oblast bear this name:

- Vorontsovo, Dukhovshchinsky District, Smolensk Oblast, a village in Dobrinskoye Rural Settlement of Dukhovshchinsky District
- Vorontsovo, Roslavlsky District, Smolensk Oblast, a village in Krapivenskoye Rural Settlement of Roslavlsky District
- Vorontsovo, Safonovsky District, Smolensk Oblast, a village in Ignatkovskoye Rural Settlement of Safonovsky District

== Tambov Oblast ==
As of 2010, one rural locality in Tambov Oblast bears this name:

- Vorontsovo, Tambov Oblast, a village in Chupovsky Selsoviet of Gavrilovsky District

== Tver Oblast ==
As of 2010, seven rural localities in Tver Oblast bear this name:

- Vorontsovo, Kalyazinsky District, Tver Oblast, a village in Kalyazinsky District
- Vorontsovo, Kashinsky District, Tver Oblast, a village in Kashinsky District
- Vorontsovo (Ustinovskoye Rural Settlement), Kimrsky District, Tver Oblast, a village in Kimrsky District; municipally, a part of Ustinovskoye Rural Settlement of that district
- Vorontsovo (Malovasilevskoye Rural Settlement), Kimrsky District, Tver Oblast, a village in Kimrsky District; municipally, a part of Malovasilevskoye Rural Settlement of that district
- Vorontsovo, Rzhevsky District, Tver Oblast, a village in Rzhevsky District
- Vorontsovo, Toropetsky District, Tver Oblast, a village in Toropetsky District
- Vorontsovo, Udomelsky District, Tver Oblast, a village in Udomelsky District

== Vladimir Oblast ==
As of 2010, two rural localities in Vladimir Oblast bear this name:

- Vorontsovo, Kolchuginsky District, Vladimir Oblast, a village in Kolchuginsky District
- Vorontsovo, Suzdalsky District, Vladimir Oblast, a village in Suzdalsky District

== Vologda Oblast ==
As of 2010, two rural localities in Vologda Oblast bear this name:

- Vorontsovo, Cherepovetsky District, Vologda Oblast, a village in Anninsky Selsoviet of Cherepovetsky District
- Vorontsovo, Sheksninsky District, Vologda Oblast, a village in Fominsky Selsoviet of Sheksninsky District

== Yaroslavl Oblast ==
As of 2010, four rural localities in Yaroslavl Oblast bear this name:

- Vorontsovo, Pereslavsky District, Yaroslavl Oblast, a selo in Ponomarevsky Rural Okrug of Pereslavsky District
- Vorontsovo, Pervomaysky District, Yaroslavl Oblast, a village in Semenovsky Rural Okrug of Pervomaysky District
- Vorontsovo, Poshekhonsky District, Yaroslavl Oblast, a village in Vasilyevsky Rural Okrug of Poshekhonsky District
- Vorontsovo, Uglichsky District, Yaroslavl Oblast, a village in Ordinsky Rural Okrug of Uglichsky District
