= Novosyolka =

Novosyolka (Russian: Новосёлка) is the name of several rural localities in Russia:

- Novosyolka, Karaidelsky District, Republic of Bashkortostan
- Novosyolka, Fyodorovsky District, Republic of Bashkortostan
- Novosyolka (Andreyevskoye Rural Settlement), Alexandrovsky District, Vladimir Oblast
- Novosyolka (Slednevskoye Rural Settlement), Alexandrovsky District, Vladimir Oblast
- Novosyolka, Kameshkovsky District, Vladimir Oblast
- Novosyolka (Razdolyevskoye Rural Settlement), Kolchuginsky District, Vladimir Oblast
- Novosyolka (Yesiplevskoye Rural Settlement), Kolchuginsky District, Vladimir Oblast
- Novosyolka, Suzdalsky District, Vladimir Oblast
- Novosyolka, Vyaznikovsky District, Vladimir Oblast
- Novosyolka, Mezhdurechensky District, Vologda Oblast

== See also ==
- Novosyolka Nerlskaya, Vladimir Oblast
- Novosilka (disambiguation)
