= Avdotyino =

Avdotyino (Russian: Авдотьино) is the name of several rural localities in Russia.

== Arkhangelsk Oblast ==
As of 2014, one rural locality in Arkhangelsk Oblast bears this name:

Arkhangelsk Oblast location map
Location of Avdotyino in Arkhangelsk Oblast

- Avdotyino, Arkhangelsk Oblast, a village in Konevsky Selsoviet of Plesetsky District; 62°08′N 39°18′E

== Kaluga Oblast ==
As of 2014, one rural locality in Kaluga Oblast bears this name:

- Avdotyino, Kaluga Oblast, a village in Maloyaroslavetsky District

== Kostroma Oblast ==
As of 2014, one rural locality in Kostroma Oblast bears this name:

Kostroma Oblast location map
Location of Avdotyino in Kostroma Oblast

- Avdotyino, Kostroma Oblast, a village in Chernopenskoye Settlement of Kostromskoy District; 57°36′N 40°58′E

== Moscow Oblast ==
As of 2014, six rural localities in Moscow Oblast bear this name:

Moscow Oblast distribution map
Distribution of the inhabited localities called Avdotyino in Moscow Oblast.

- Avdotyino, Domodedovo, Moscow Oblast, a village under the administrative jurisdiction of Domodedovo City Under Oblast Jurisdiction; 55.423980°N 37.722346°E
- Avdotyino, Mozhaysky District, Moscow Oblast, a village in Goretovskoye Rural Settlement of Mozhaysky District; 55°39′N 35°50′E
- Avdotyino, Noginsky District, Moscow Oblast, a village in Yamkinskoye Rural Settlement of Noginsky District; 55°56′N 38°14′E
- Avdotyino, Aksinyinskoye Rural Settlement, Stupinsky District, Moscow Oblast, a selo in Aksinyinskoye Rural Settlement of Stupinsky District; 55°15′N 38°11′E
- Avdotyino, Semenovskoye Rural Settlement, Stupinsky District, Moscow Oblast, a village in Semenovskoye Rural Settlement of Stupinsky District; 55°02′N 37°45′E
- Avdotyino, Volokolamsky District, Moscow Oblast, a village in Kashinskoye Rural Settlement of Volokolamsky District; 56°04′N 36°01′E

== Ryazan Oblast ==
As of 2014, one rural locality in Ryazan Oblast bears this name:

- Avdotyino, Ryazan Oblast, a village in Karnaukhovsky Rural Okrug of Shatsky District

== Smolensk Oblast ==
As of 2014, one rural locality in Smolensk Oblast bears this name:

- Avdotyino, Smolensk Oblast, a village in Losnenskoye Rural Settlement of Pochinkovsky District

== Ulyanovsk Oblast ==
As of 2014, one rural locality in Ulyanovsk Oblast bears this name:

- Avdotyino, Ulyanovsk Oblast, a village in Timiryazevsky Rural Okrug of Ulyanovsky District

== Vladimir Oblast ==
As of 2014, four rural localities in Vladimir Oblast bear this name:

- Avdotyino, Kolchuginsky District, Vladimir Oblast, a village in Kolchuginsky District
- Avdotyino, Kovrovsky District, Vladimir Oblast, a village in Kovrovsky District
- Avdotyino, Sudogodsky District, Vladimir Oblast, a village in Sudogodsky District
- Avdotyino, Yuryev-Polsky District, Vladimir Oblast, a selo in Yuryev-Polsky District

== Vologda Oblast ==
As of 2014, two rural localities in Vologda Oblast bear this name:

- Avdotyino, Sosnovsky Selsoviet, Vologodsky District, Vologda Oblast, a village in Sosnovsky Selsoviet of Vologodsky District
- Avdotyino, Spassky Selsoviet, Vologodsky District, Vologda Oblast, a village in Spassky Selsoviet of Vologodsky District

== Yaroslavl Oblast ==
As of 2014, one rural locality in Yaroslavl Oblast bears this name:

- Avdotyino, Yaroslavl Oblast, a village in Ninorovsky Rural Okrug of Uglichsky District
