= Dyakonovo =

Dyakonovo may refer to several places in Russia:

- Dyakonovo, Vyaznikovsky District, Vladimir Oblast
- Dyakonovo, Gryazovetsky District, Vologda Oblast
- Dyakonovo, Kolchuginsky District, Vladimir Oblast
- Dyakonovo, Kursk Oblast
- Dyakonovo, Mezhdurechensky District, Vologda Oblast
- Dyakonovo, Muromsky District, Vladimir Oblast
