= Safonovo =

Safonovo (Russian: Сафоново) is the name of several inhabited localities in Russia.

Urban localities

- Safonovo, Safonovsky District, Smolensk Oblast, a town in Safonovsky District of Smolensk Oblast; administratively incorporated as Safonovskoye Urban Settlement
- Safonovo, Murmansk Oblast, an urban-type settlement under the administrative jurisdiction of the closed administrative-territorial formation of Severomorsk, Murmansk Oblast

Rural localities

- Safonovo, Krasnoborsky District, Arkhangelsk Oblast, a village in Permogorsky Selsoviet of Krasnoborsky District of Arkhangelsk Oblast
- Safonovo, Mezensky District, Arkhangelsk Oblast, a village in Yelkinsky Selsoviet of Mezensky District of Arkhangelsk Oblast
- Safonovo, Chelyabinsk Oblast, a village in Shumovsky Selsoviet of Krasnoarmeysky District of Chelyabinsk Oblast
- Safonovo, Buysky District, Kostroma Oblast, a village in Baranovskoye Settlement of Buysky District of Kostroma Oblast
- Safonovo, Parfenyevsky District, Kostroma Oblast, a village in Nikolo-Polomskoye Settlement of Parfenyevsky District of Kostroma Oblast
- Safonovo, Sharyinsky District, Kostroma Oblast, a village in Shangskoye Settlement of Sharyinsky District of Kostroma Oblast
- Safonovo, Leningrad Oblast, a village under the administrative jurisdiction of Yefimovskoye Settlement Municipal Formation in Boksitogorsky District of Leningrad Oblast
- Safonovo, Lipetsk Oblast, a selo in Safonovsky Selsoviet of Dobrinsky District of Lipetsk Oblast
- Safonovo, Chekhovsky District, Moscow Oblast, a village in Stremilovskoye Rural Settlement of Chekhovsky District of Moscow Oblast
- Safonovo, Dmitrovsky District, Moscow Oblast, a village under the administrative jurisdiction of the Town of Yakhroma in Dmitrovsky District of Moscow Oblast
- Safonovo, Ramensky District, Moscow Oblast, a village in Safonovskoye Rural Settlement of Ramensky District of Moscow Oblast
- Safonovo, Novgorod Oblast, a village in Pesskoye Settlement of Khvoyninsky District of Novgorod Oblast
- Safonovo, Omsk Oblast, a village in Lamanovsky Rural Okrug of Kolosovsky District of Omsk Oblast
- Safonovo, Oryol Oblast, a village in Lomovsky Selsoviet of Zalegoshchensky District of Oryol Oblast
- Safonovo, Krasnogorodsky District, Pskov Oblast, a village in Krasnogorodsky District, Pskov Oblast
- Safonovo, Kunyinsky District, Pskov Oblast, a village in Kunyinsky District, Pskov Oblast
- Safonovo, Sebezhsky District, Pskov Oblast, a village in Sebezhsky District, Pskov Oblast
- Safonovo (Porechenskaya Rural Settlement), Velikoluksky District, Pskov Oblast, a village in Velikoluksky District, Pskov Oblast; municipally, a part of Porechenskaya Rural Settlement of that district
- Safonovo (Shelkovskaya Rural Settlement), Velikoluksky District, Pskov Oblast, a village in Velikoluksky District, Pskov Oblast; municipally, a part of Shelkovskaya Rural Settlement of that district
- Safonovo, Dukhovshchinsky District, Smolensk Oblast, a village in Prechistenskoye Rural Settlement of Dukhovshchinsky District of Smolensk Oblast
- Safonovo, Ugransky District, Smolensk Oblast, a village in Drozhzhinskoye Rural Settlement of Ugransky District of Smolensk Oblast
- Safonovo, Republic of Tatarstan, a village in Zelenodolsky District of the Republic of Tatarstan
- Safonovo, Tver Oblast, a village in Aleshino Rural Settlement of Rameshkovsky District of Tver Oblast
- Safonovo, Kolchuginsky District, Vladimir Oblast, a village in Kolchuginsky District, Vladimir Oblast
- Safonovo, Muromsky District, Vladimir Oblast, a village in Muromsky District, Vladimir Oblast
- Safonovo, Vologda Oblast, a village in Nikolsky Selsoviet of Kaduysky District of Vologda Oblast

== See also ==
- Safonov
