= Panteleyevo =

Panteleyevo (Russian: Пантелеево) may refer to several rural localities in Russia:

- Panteleyevo, Kolchuginsky District, Vladimir Oblast, village in Razdolyevskoye Rural Settlement, Kolchuginsky District, Vladimir Oblast
- Panteleyevo, Kovrovsky District, Vladimir Oblast, selo in Klyazminskoye Rural Settlement, Kovrovsky District, Vladimir Oblast
- Panteleyevo, Nikolsky District, Vologda Oblast, village in Vakhnevskoye Rural Settlement, Nikolsky District, Vologda Oblast
- Panteleyevo, Vologodsky District, Vologda Oblast, village in Mayskoye Rural Settlement, Vologodsky District, Vologda Oblast
