= Zinovyevo =

Zinovyevo (Russian: Зиновьево) is the name of several rural localities in Russia:

- Zinovyevo, Alexandrovsky District, Vladimir Oblast, a village in Andreyevskoye Rural Settlement of Alexandrovsky District in Vladimir Oblast
- Zinovyevo, Kolchuginsky District, Vladimir Oblast, a village in Razdolyevskoye Rural Settlement of Kolchuginsky District in Vladimir Oblast
