= Serp i Molot, Vladimir Oblast =

Serp i Molot Серп и Молот
- Settlement
- Location within Vladimir Oblast Location within Russia
- Coordinates: 56°22′N 39°28′E
- Country: Russia
- Region: Vladimir Oblast
- District: Kolchuginsky District
- Time zone: UTC+3:00

Serp i Molot (Russian: Серп и Молот) is a rural locality (a settlement) in Ilyinskoye Rural Settlement, Kolchuginsky District, Vladimir Oblast, Russia. The population was 142 as of 2010. There are 7 streets.

== Geography ==
Serp i Molot is located 12 km northeast of Kolchugino (the district's administrative centre) by road. Shishlikha is the nearest rural locality.
