= Nogosekovo =

Nogosekovo Ногосеково
- Village
- Location within Vladimir Oblast Location within Russia
- Coordinates: 56°17′N 39°42′E
- Country: Russia
- Region: Vladimir Oblast
- District: Kolchuginsky District
- Time zone: UTC+3:00

Nogosekovo (Russian: Ногосеково) is a rural locality (a village) in Yesiplevskoye Rural Settlement, Kolchuginsky District, Vladimir Oblast, Russia. The population was 1 as of 2010.

== Geography ==
Nogosekovo is located 24 km east of Kolchugino (the district's administrative centre) by road. Nefedovka is the nearest rural locality.
