= Dmitriyevsky Pogost =

Dmitriyevsky Pogost Дмитриевский Погост
- Village
- Location within Vladimir Oblast Location within Russia
- Coordinates: 56°18′N 39°24′E
- Country: Russia
- Region: Vladimir Oblast
- District: Kolchuginsky District
- Time zone: UTC+3:00

Dmitriyevsky Pogost (Russian: Дмитриевский Погост) is a rural locality (a village) in Kolchugino, Kolchuginsky District, Vladimir Oblast, Russia. The population was 14 as of 2010.

== Geography ==
Dmitriyevsky Pogost is located on the Peksha River, 5 km east of Kolchugino (the district's administrative centre) by road. Litvinovo is the nearest rural locality.
