= Kopylki =

Kopylki Копылки
- Village
- Location within Vladimir Oblast Location within Russia
- Coordinates: 56°17′N 39°28′E
- Country: Russia
- Region: Vladimir Oblast
- District: Kolchuginsky District
- Time zone: UTC+3:00

Kopylki (Russian: Копылки) is a rural locality (a village) in Yesiplevskoye Rural Settlement, Kolchuginsky District, Vladimir Oblast, Russia. The population was 79 as of 2010.

== Geography ==
Kopylki is located 9 km (5.6 mi) east of Kolchugino (the district's administrative centre) by road. Barykino is the nearest rural locality.
