= Barykino (Ilyinskoye Rural Settlement), Kolchuginsky District, Vladimir Oblast =

Barykino Барыкино
- Village
- Location within Vladimir Oblast Location within Russia
- Coordinates: 56°23′N 39°30′E
- Country: Russia
- Region: Vladimir Oblast
- District: Kolchuginsky District
- Time zone: UTC+3:00

Barykino (Russian: Барыкино) is a rural locality (a village) in Ilyinskoye Rural Settlement, Kolchuginsky District, Vladimir Oblast, Russia. The population was 1 as of 2010.

== Geography ==
The village is located 10 km east from Bolshevik, 14 km north-east from Kolchugino.
