= Bolshoye Zabelino =

Bolshoye Zabelino Большое Забелино
- Village
- Location within Vladimir Oblast Location within Russia
- Coordinates: 56°21′N 39°26′E
- Country: Russia
- Region: Vladimir Oblast
- District: Kolchuginsky District
- Time zone: UTC+3:00

Bolshoye Zabelino (Russian: Большое Забелино) is a rural locality (a village) in Ilyinskoye Rural Settlement, Kolchuginsky District, Vladimir Oblast, Russia. The population was 2 as of 2010.

== Geography ==
Bolshoye Zabelino is located 11 km northeast of Kolchugino (the district's administrative centre) by road. Lychevo is the nearest rural locality.
