= Ogibka =

Ogibka Огибка
- Village
- Location within Vladimir Oblast Location within Russia
- Coordinates: 56°18′N 39°28′E
- Country: Russia
- Region: Vladimir Oblast
- District: Kolchuginsky District
- Time zone: UTC+3:00

Ogibka (Russian: Огибка) is a rural locality (a village) in Yesiplevskoye Rural Settlement, Kolchuginsky District, Vladimir Oblast, Russia. The population was 33 as of 2010.

== Geography ==
Ogibka is located on the Pazha River, 10 km east of Kolchugino (the district's administrative centre) by road. Kopylki is the nearest rural locality.
