= Bashkirdovo =

Bashkirdovo Башкирдово
- Village
- Location within Vladimir Oblast Location within Russia
- Coordinates: 56°17′N 39°41′E
- Country: Russia
- Region: Vladimir Oblast
- District: Kolchuginsky District
- Time zone: UTC+3:00

Bashkirdovo (Russian: Башкирдово) is a rural locality (a village) in Yesiplevskoye Rural Settlement, Kolchuginsky District, Vladimir Oblast, Russia. The population was 4 as of 2010.

== Geography ==
Bashkirdovo is located 23 km (14 mi) east of Kolchugino (the district's administrative centre) by road. Novobusino is the nearest rural locality.
