= Kosteyevo =

Kosteyevo Костеево
- Village
- Location within Vladimir Oblast Location within Russia
- Coordinates: 56°17′N 39°34′E
- Country: Russia
- Region: Vladimir Oblast
- District: Kolchuginsky District
- Time zone: UTC+3:00

Kosteyevo (Russian: Костеево) is a rural locality (a village) in Yesiplevskoye Rural Settlement, Kolchuginsky District, Vladimir Oblast, Russia. The population was 9 as of 2010.

== Geography ==
Kosteyevo is located 15 km east of Kolchugino (the district's administrative centre) by road. Novoselka is the nearest rural locality.
