= Troitsa =

Troitsa (Russian: Троица) is the name of several rural localities in Russia.

== Modern localities ==
=== Kaluga Oblast ===
As of 2012, two rural localities in Kaluga Oblast bear this name:

- Troitsa, Yukhnovsky District, Kaluga Oblast, a village in Yukhnovsky District
- Troitsa, Zhukovsky District, Kaluga Oblast, a village in Zhukovsky District

=== Khanty-Mansi Autonomous Okrug ===
As of 2012, one rural locality in Khanty-Mansi Autonomous Okrug bears this name:

- Troitsa, Khanty-Mansi Autonomous Okrug, a selo in Khanty-Mansiysky District

=== Kirov Oblast ===
As of 2012, two rural localities in Kirov Oblast bear this name:

- Troitsa, Belokholunitsky District, Kirov Oblast, a selo in Troitsky Rural Okrug of Belokholunitsky District
- Troitsa, Podosinovsky District, Kirov Oblast, a selo under the administrative jurisdiction of Podosinovets Urban-Type Settlement in Podosinovsky District

=== Kostroma Oblast ===
As of 2012, two rural localities in Kostroma Oblast bear this name:

- Troitsa, Nerekhtsky District, Kostroma Oblast, a selo in Prigorodnoye Settlement of Nerekhtsky District
- Troitsa, Vokhomsky District, Kostroma Oblast, a selo in Belkovskoye Settlement of Vokhomsky District

=== Krasnoyarsk Krai ===
As of 2012, one rural locality in Krasnoyarsk Krai bears this name:

- Troitsa, Krasnoyarsk Krai, a selo in Troitsky Selsoviet of Pirovsky District

=== Kursk Oblast ===
As of 2012, one rural locality in Kursk Oblast bears this name:

- Troitsa, Kursk Oblast, a selo in Troitsky Selsoviet of Kursky District

=== Federal city of Moscow ===
As of 2012, one rural locality in the federal city of Moscow bears this name:

- Troitsa, Moscow, a village in Voronovskoye Settlement of Troitsky Administrative Okrug

=== Moscow Oblast ===
As of 2012, three rural localities in Moscow Oblast bear this name:

- Troitsa, Istrinsky District, Moscow Oblast, a village in Yadrominskoye Rural Settlement of Istrinsky District
- Troitsa, Mozhaysky District, Moscow Oblast, a village in Borodinskoye Rural Settlement of Mozhaysky District
- Troitsa, Yegoryevsky District, Moscow Oblast, a village under the administrative jurisdiction of the Town of Yegoryevsk in Yegoryevsky District

=== Nizhny Novgorod Oblast ===
As of 2012, one rural locality in Nizhny Novgorod Oblast bears this name:

- Troitsa, Nizhny Novgorod Oblast, a selo in Shapkinsky Selsoviet of Bogorodsky District

=== Novgorod Oblast ===
As of 2012, one rural locality in Novgorod Oblast bears this name:

- Troitsa, Novgorod Oblast, a village in Rakomskoye Settlement of Novgorodsky District

=== Perm Krai ===
As of 2012, one rural locality in Perm Krai bears this name:

- Troitsa, Perm Krai, a selo in Permsky District

=== Pskov Oblast ===
As of 2012, two rural localities in Pskov Oblast bear this name:

- Troitsa, Bezhanitsky District, Pskov Oblast, a village in Bezhanitsky District
- Troitsa, Velikoluksky District, Pskov Oblast, a village in Velikoluksky District

=== Ryazan Oblast ===
As of 2012, two rural localities in Ryazan Oblast bear this name:

- Troitsa, Korablinsky District, Ryazan Oblast, a selo in Troitsky Rural Okrug of Korablinsky District
- Troitsa, Spassky District, Ryazan Oblast, a selo in Troitsky Rural Okrug of Spassky District

=== Smolensk Oblast ===
As of 2012, one rural locality in Smolensk Oblast bears this name:

- Troitsa, Smolensk Oblast, a village in Beleninskoye Rural Settlement of Safonovsky District

=== Tver Oblast ===
As of 2012, three rural localities in Tver Oblast bear this name:

- Troitsa, Kalininsky District, Tver Oblast, a village in Mednovskoye Rural Settlement of Kalininsky District
- Troitsa, Rameshkovsky District, Tver Oblast, a village in Kiverichi Rural Settlement of Rameshkovsky District
- Troitsa, Udomelsky District, Tver Oblast, a village in Ryadskoye Rural Settlement of Udomelsky District

=== Vladimir Oblast ===
As of 2012, one rural locality in Vladimir Oblast bears this name:

- Troitsa, Vladimir Oblast, a village in Kolchuginsky District

=== Yaroslavl Oblast ===
As of 2012, two rural localities in Yaroslavl Oblast bear this name:

- Troitsa, Danilovsky District, Yaroslavl Oblast, a village in Fedurinsky Rural Okrug of Danilovsky District
- Troitsa, Lyubimsky District, Yaroslavl Oblast, a selo in Troitsky Rural Okrug of Lyubimsky District

== Renamed localities ==
- Troitsa, until 1904, name of Udomlya, a town in Udomelsky District of Tver Oblast
