= Kliny (selo), Kolchuginsky District, Vladimir Oblast =

Kliny Клины
- Selo
- Location within Vladimir Oblast Location within Russia
- Coordinates: 56°26′N 39°28′E
- Country: Russia
- Region: Vladimir Oblast
- District: Kolchuginsky District
- Time zone: UTC+3:00

Kliny (Russian: Клины) is a rural locality (a selo) in Bavlenskoye Rural Settlement, Kolchuginsky District, Vladimir Oblast, Russia. The population was 3 as of 2010.

== Geography ==
Kliny is located 25 km northeast of Kolchugino (the district's administrative centre) by road. Kliny (settlement) is the nearest rural locality.
