= Bavleny (selo) =

Bavleny Бавлены
- Selo
- Location within Vladimir Oblast Location within Russia
- Coordinates: 56°23′N 39°35′E
- Country: Russia
- Region: Vladimir Oblast
- District: Kolchuginsky District
- Time zone: UTC+3:00

Bavleny (Russian: Бавлены) is a rural locality (a selo) in Bavlenskoye Rural Settlement, Kolchuginsky District, Vladimir Oblast, Russia. The population was 2,540 as of 2010. There are 7 streets.

== Geography ==
Bavleny is located 21 km northeast of Kolchugino (the district's administrative centre) by road. Bavleny (settlement) is the nearest rural locality.
