= Florishchi =

Florishchi Флорищи
- Selo
- Location within Vladimir Oblast Location within Russia
- Coordinates: 56°18′N 39°13′E
- Country: Russia
- Region: Vladimir Oblast
- District: Kolchuginsky District
- Time zone: UTC+3:00

Florishchi (Russian: Флорищи) is a rural locality (a selo) in Florishchinskoye Rural Settlement, Kolchuginsky District, Vladimir Oblast, Russia. The population was 226 in 2010. There are eight streets.

== Geography ==
Florishchi is located 19 km west of Kolchugino (the district's administrative centre) by road. Dyakonovo is the nearest rural locality.
