= Novobusino =

Novobusino Новобусино
- Selo
- Location within Vladimir Oblast Location within Russia
- Coordinates: 56°17′N 39°40′E
- Country: Russia
- Region: Vladimir Oblast
- District: Kolchuginsky District
- Time zone: UTC+3:00

Novobusino (Russian: Новобусино) is a rural locality (a selo) in Yesiplevskoye Rural Settlement, Kolchuginsky District, Vladimir Oblast, Russia. The population was 363 as of 2010. There are 9 streets.

== Geography ==
Novobusino is located 21 km east of Kolchugino (the district's administrative centre) by road. Petrushino is the nearest rural locality.
