= Ladozhino =

Ladozhino Ладожино
- Village
- Location within Vladimir Oblast Location within Russia
- Coordinates: 56°24′N 39°09′E
- Country: Russia
- Region: Vladimir Oblast
- District: Kolchuginsky District
- Time zone: UTC+3:00

Ladozhino (Russian: Ладожино) is a rural locality (a village) in Florishchinskoye Rural Settlement, Kolchuginsky District, Vladimir Oblast, Russia. The population was 3 as of 2010. There are 2 streets.

== Geography ==
Ladozhino is located 21 km northwest of Kolchugino (the district's administrative centre) by road. Osino is the nearest rural locality.
