= Paddubki =

Paddubki Паддубки
- Village
- Location within Vladimir Oblast Location within Russia
- Coordinates: 56°15′N 39°23′E
- Country: Russia
- Region: Vladimir Oblast
- District: Kolchuginsky District
- Time zone: UTC+3:00

Paddubki (Russian: Паддубки) is a rural locality (a village) in Razdolyevskoye Rural Settlement, Kolchuginsky District, Vladimir Oblast, Russia. The population was 8 as of 2010.

== Geography ==
Paddubki is located 4 km south of Kolchugino (the district's administrative centre) by road. Berechino is the nearest rural locality.
