= Petrushino, Kolchuginsky District, Vladimir Oblast =

Petrushino Петрушино
- Village
- Location within Vladimir Oblast Location within Russia
- Coordinates: 56°16′N 39°40′E
- Country: Russia
- Region: Vladimir Oblast
- District: Kolchuginsky District
- Time zone: UTC+3:00

Petrushino (Russian: Петрушино) is a rural locality (a village) in Yesiplevskoye Rural Settlement, Kolchuginsky District, Vladimir Oblast, Russia. The population was 1 as of 2010.

== Geography ==
Petrushino is located on the Tsiminka River, 22 km east of Kolchugino (the district's administrative centre) by road. Novobusino is the nearest rural locality.
