= Lychyovo =

Lychyovo Лычёво
- Village
- Location within Vladimir Oblast Location within Russia
- Coordinates: 56°22′N 39°25′E
- Country: Russia
- Region: Vladimir Oblast
- District: Kolchuginsky District
- Time zone: UTC+3:00

Lychyovo (Russian: Лычёво) is a rural locality (a village) in Ilyinskoye Rural Settlement, Kolchuginsky District, Vladimir Oblast, Russia. The population was 10 as of 2010.

== Geography ==
Lychyovo is located 16 km north of Kolchugino (the district's administrative centre) by road. Bolshevik is the nearest rural locality.
