= Krasny Ruchey =

Krasny Ruchey Красный Ручей
- Village
- Location within Vladimir Oblast Location within Russia
- Coordinates: 56°22′N 39°20′E
- Country: Russia
- Region: Vladimir Oblast
- District: Kolchuginsky District
- Time zone: UTC+3:00

Krasny Ruchey (Russian: Красный Ручей) is a rural locality (a village) in Ilyinskoye Rural Settlement, Kolchuginsky District, Vladimir Oblast, Russia. The population was 1 as of 2010. There are 4 streets.

== Geography ==
Krasny Ruchey is located 10 km west from Bolshevik, 17 km north of Kolchugino (the district's administrative centre) by road. Obukhovo is the nearest rural locality.
