= Makarovo, Kolchuginsky District, Vladimir Oblast =

Makarovo Макарово
- Village
- Location within Vladimir Oblast Location within Russia
- Coordinates: 56°22′N 39°13′E
- Country: Russia
- Region: Vladimir Oblast
- District: Kolchuginsky District
- Time zone: UTC+3:00

Makarovo (Russian: Макарово) is a rural locality (a village) in Florishchinskoye Rural Settlement, Kolchuginsky District, Vladimir Oblast, Russia. The population was 3 as of 2010. There are 4 streets.

== Geography ==
Makarovo is located 15 km northwest of Kolchugino (the district's administrative centre) by road. Metallist is the nearest rural locality.
