= Sobino =

Sobino Собино
- Village
- Location within Vladimir Oblast Location within Russia
- Coordinates: 56°15′N 39°21′E
- Country: Russia
- Region: Vladimir Oblast
- District: Kolchuginsky District
- Time zone: UTC+3:00

Sobino (Russian: Собино) is a rural locality (a village) in Razdolyevskoye Rural Settlement, Kolchuginsky District, Vladimir Oblast, Russia. The population was 11 as of 2010. There are 8 streets.

== Geography ==
Sobino is located 5 km south of Kolchugino (the district's administrative centre) by road. Berechino is the nearest rural locality.
