= Vaulovo =

Vaulovo Ваулово
- Selo
- Location within Vladimir Oblast Location within Russia
- Coordinates: 56°07′N 39°17′E
- Country: Russia
- Region: Vladimir Oblast
- District: Kolchuginsky District
- Time zone: UTC+3:00

Vaulovo (Russian: Ваулово) is a rural locality (a selo) in Razdolyevskoye Rural Settlement, Kolchuginsky District, Vladimir Oblast, Russia. The population was 139 as of 2010. There are 5 streets.

== Geography ==
Vaulovo is located on the Volga River, 33 km south of Kolchugino (the district's administrative centre) by road. Konyshevo is the nearest rural locality.
