= Kliny (settlement), Kolchuginsky District, Vladimir Oblast =

Kliny Клины
- Settlement
- Location within Vladimir Oblast Location within Russia
- Coordinates: 56°26′N 39°29′E
- Country: Russia
- Region: Vladimir Oblast
- District: Kolchuginsky District
- Time zone: UTC+3:00

Kliny (Russian: Клины) is a rural locality (a settlement) in Bavlenskoye Rural Settlement, Kolchuginsky District, Vladimir Oblast, Russia. The population was 36 as of 2010.

== Geography ==
Kliny is located 23 km northeast of Kolchugino (the district's administrative centre) by road. Kliny (selo) is the nearest rural locality.
