= Litvinovskiye Khutora =

Litvinovskiye Khutora Литвиновские Хутора
- Village
- Location within Vladimir Oblast Location within Russia
- Coordinates: 56°18′N 39°24′E
- Country: Russia
- Region: Vladimir Oblast
- District: Kolchuginsky District
- Time zone: UTC+3:00

Litvinovskiye Khutora (Russian: Литвиновские Хутора) is a rural locality (a village) in Kolchugino, Kolchuginsky District, Vladimir Oblast, Russia. The population was 8 as of 2010.

== Geography ==
Litvinovskiye Khutora is located 6 km east of Kolchugino (the district's administrative centre) by road. Litvinovo is the nearest rural locality.
