= Bolshoye Kuzminskoye =

Bolshoye Kuzminskoye Большое Кузьминское
- Selo
- Location within Vladimir Oblast Location within Russia
- Coordinates: 56°24′N 39°31′E
- Country: Russia
- Region: Vladimir Oblast
- District: Kolchuginsky District
- Time zone: UTC+3:00

Bolshoye Kuzminskoye (Russian: Большое Кузьминское) is a rural locality (a selo) in Bavlenskoye Rural Settlement, Kolchuginsky District, Vladimir Oblast, Russia. The population was 717 as of 2010. There are 5 streets.

== Geography ==
Bolshoye Kuzminskoye is located 19 km northeast of Kolchugino (the district's administrative centre) by road. Tovarkovo is the nearest rural locality.
