= Davydovskoye =

Davydovskoye Давыдовское
- Selo
- Location within Vladimir Oblast Location within Russia
- Coordinates: 56°21′N 39°22′E
- Country: Russia
- Region: Vladimir Oblast
- District: Kolchuginsky District
- Time zone: UTC+3:00

Davydovskoye (Russian: Давыдовское) is a rural locality (a selo) in Ilyinskoye Rural Settlement, Kolchuginsky District, Vladimir Oblast, Russia. The population was 121 as of 2010. There are 13 streets.

== Geography ==
Davydovskoye is located 12 km north of Kolchugino (the district's administrative centre) by road. Novoye is the nearest rural locality.
