= Golyazh =

Golyazh Гольяж
- Village
- Location within Vladimir Oblast Location within Russia
- Coordinates: 56°20′N 39°23′E
- Country: Russia
- Region: Vladimir Oblast
- District: Kolchuginsky District
- Time zone: UTC+3:00

Golyazh (Russian: Гольяж) is a rural locality (a village) in Kolchugino, Kolchuginsky District, Vladimir Oblast, Russia. The population was 55 as of 2010.

== Geography ==
Golyazh is located on the Peksha River, 9 km north of Kolchugino (the district's administrative centre) by road. Litvinovo is the nearest rural locality.
