= Berechino =

Berechino Беречино
- Selo
- Location within Vladimir Oblast Location within Russia
- Coordinates: 56°15′N 39°23′E
- Country: Russia
- Region: Vladimir Oblast
- District: Kolchuginsky District
- Time zone: UTC+3:00

Berechino (Russian: Беречино) is a rural locality (a selo) in Razdolyevskoye Rural Settlement, Kolchuginsky District, Vladimir Oblast, Russia. The population was 254 as of 2010.

== Geography ==
Berechino is located 6 km south of Kolchugino (the district's administrative centre) by road. Novy is the nearest rural locality.
