= Maloye Bratsevo =

Maloye Bratsevo Малое Братцево
- Village
- Location within Vladimir Oblast Location within Russia
- Coordinates: 56°25′N 39°22′E
- Country: Russia
- Region: Vladimir Oblast
- District: Kolchuginsky District
- Time zone: UTC+3:00

Maloye Bratsevo (Russian: Малое Братцево) is a rural locality (a village) in Ilyinskoye Rural Settlement, Kolchuginsky District, Vladimir Oblast, Russia. As of 2010, the population was 5, and the village had 2 streets.

== Geography ==
Maloye Bratsevo is located 20 km north of Kolchugino (the district's administrative centre) by road. Bolshoye Bratsevo is the nearest rural locality.
