= Boristsevo =

Boristsevo Борисцево
- Village
- Location within Vladimir Oblast Location within Russia
- Coordinates: 56°18′N 39°40′E
- Country: Russia
- Region: Vladimir Oblast
- District: Kolchuginsky District
- Time zone: UTC+3:00

Boristsevo (Russian: Борисцево) is a rural locality (a village) in Yesiplevskoye Rural Settlement, Kolchuginsky District, Vladimir Oblast, Russia. The population was 15 as of 2010.

== Geography ==
Boristsevo is located 24 km east of Kolchugino (the district's administrative centre) by road. Dvoryatkino is the nearest rural locality.
