= Bolshoye Bratsevo =

Bolshoye Bratsevo Большое Братцево
- Village
- Location within Vladimir Oblast Location within Russia
- Coordinates: 56°25′N 39°22′E
- Country: Russia
- Region: Vladimir Oblast
- District: Kolchuginsky District
- Time zone: UTC+3:00

Bolshoye Bratsevo (Russian: Большое Братцево) is a rural locality (a village) in Ilyinskoye Rural Settlement, Kolchuginsky District, Vladimir Oblast, Russia. The population was 3 as of 2010. There are 2 streets.

== Geography ==
Bolshoye Bratsevo is located 20 km north of Kolchugino (the district's administrative centre) by road. Maloye Bratsevo is the nearest rural locality.
