= Barykino (Yesiplevskoye Rural Settlement), Kolchuginsky District, Vladimir Oblast =

Barykino Барыкино
- Village
- Location within Vladimir Oblast Location within Russia
- Coordinates: 56°17′N 39°27′E
- Country: Russia
- Region: Vladimir Oblast
- District: Kolchuginsky District
- Time zone: UTC+3:00

Barykino (Russian: Барыкино) is a rural locality (a village) in Yesiplevskoye Rural Settlement, Kolchuginsky District, Vladimir Oblast, Russia. The population was 30 as of 2010.

== Geography ==
The village is located 8 km west from Yesiplevo, 18 km north-east Kolchugino.
