= Litvinovo (settlement), Vladimir Oblast =

Litvinovo Литвиново
- Settlement
- Location within Vladimir Oblast Location within Russia
- Coordinates: 56°18′N 39°24′E
- Country: Russia
- Region: Vladimir Oblast
- District: Kolchuginsky District
- Time zone: UTC+3:00

Litvinovo (Russian: Литвиново) is a rural locality (a settlement) in Kolchugino, Kolchuginsky District, Vladimir Oblast, Russia. The population was 118 as of 2010.

== Geography ==
Litvinovo is located between Peksha and Mezhonka Rivers, 5 km northeast of Kolchugino (the district's administrative centre) by road. Dmitriyevsky Pogost is the nearest rural locality.
