= Staraya, Kolchuginsky District, Vladimir Oblast =

Staraya Старая
- Village
- Location within Vladimir Oblast Location within Russia
- Coordinates: 56°15′N 39°08′E
- Country: Russia
- Region: Vladimir Oblast
- District: Kolchuginsky District
- Time zone: UTC+3:00

Staraya (Russian: Старая) is a rural locality (a village) in Florishchinskoye Rural Settlement, Kolchuginsky District, Vladimir Oblast, Russia. The population was 13 as of 2010. There are 3 streets.

== Geography ==
Staraya is located 16 km southwest of Kolchugino (the district's administrative centre) by road. Zherdevo is the nearest rural locality.
