= Zolotukha, Vladimir Oblast =

Zolotukha Золотуха
- Settlement
- Location within Vladimir Oblast Location within Russia
- Coordinates: 56°25′N 39°21′E
- Country: Russia
- Region: Vladimir Oblast
- District: Kolchuginsky District
- Time zone: UTC+3:00

Zolotukha (Russian: Золотуха) is a rural locality (a settlement) in Ilyinskoye Rural Settlement, Kolchuginsky District, Vladimir Oblast, Russia. The population was 281 as of 2010. There are 18 streets.

== Geography ==
Zolotukha is located on the Peksha River, 19 km north of Kolchugino (the district's administrative centre) by road. Aleksino is the nearest rural locality.
