= Aleshki, Vladimir Oblast =

Aleshki Алешки
- Village
- Location within Vladimir Oblast Location within Russia
- Coordinates: 56°18′N 39°10′E
- Country: Russia
- Region: Vladimir Oblast
- District: Kolchuginsky District
- Time zone: UTC+3:00

Aleshki (Russian: Алешки) is a rural locality (a village) in Florishchinskoye Rural Settlement, Kolchuginsky District, Vladimir Oblast, Russia. The population was 4 as of 2010.

== Geography ==
Aleshki is located on the Shorna River, 22 km west of Kolchugino (the district's administrative centre) by road. Dyakonovo is the nearest rural locality.
