= Tyutkovo =

Tyutkovo Тютьково
- Village
- Location within Vladimir Oblast Location within Russia
- Coordinates: 56°26′N 39°13′E
- Country: Russia
- Region: Vladimir Oblast
- District: Kolchuginsky District
- Time zone: UTC+3:00

Tyutkovo (Russian: Тютьково) is a rural locality (a village) in Florishchinskoye Rural Settlement, Kolchuginsky District, Vladimir Oblast, Russia. The population was 7 as of 2010.

== Geography ==
Tyutkovo is located 26 km northwest of Kolchugino (the district's administrative centre) by road. Bogorodskoye is the nearest rural locality.
