= Yezhovo =

Yezhovo Ежово
- Village
- Location within Vladimir Oblast Location within Russia
- Coordinates: 56°24′N 39°33′E
- Country: Russia
- Region: Vladimir Oblast
- District: Kolchuginsky District
- Time zone: UTC+3:00

Yezhovo (Russian: Ежово) is a rural locality (a village) in Bavlenskoye Rural Settlement, Kolchuginsky District, Vladimir Oblast, Russia. The population was 22 as of 2010.

== Geography ==
Yezhovo is located 19 km northeast of Kolchugino (the district's administrative centre) by road. Tovarkovo is the nearest rural locality.
