= Bukharino =

Bukharino Бухарино
- Village
- Location within Vladimir Oblast Location within Russia
- Coordinates: 56°16′N 39°32′E
- Country: Russia
- Region: Vladimir Oblast
- District: Kolchuginsky District
- Named for: Nikolai Bukharin
- Time zone: UTC+3:00

Bukharino (Russian: Бухарино) is a rural locality (a village) in Yesiplevskoye Rural Settlement, Kolchuginsky District, Vladimir Oblast, Russia. The population was 3 as of 2010. There are 2 streets.

== Geography ==
Bukharino is located on the Ilmovka River, 14 km southeast of Kolchugino (the district's administrative centre) by road. Novoselka is the nearest rural locality.
