= Bogorodskoye, Kolchuginsky District, Vladimir Oblast =

Bogorodskoye Богородское
- Selo
- Location within Vladimir Oblast Location within Russia
- Coordinates: 56°25′N 39°11′E
- Country: Russia
- Region: Vladimir Oblast
- District: Kolchuginsky District
- Time zone: UTC+3:00

Bogorodskoye (Russian: Богородское) is a rural locality (a selo) in Florishchinskoye Rural Settlement, Kolchuginsky District, Vladimir Oblast, Russia. The population was 21 as of 2010. There are 3 streets.

== Geography ==
Bogorodskoye is located 22 km northwest of Kolchugino (the district's administrative centre) by road. Ladozhino is the nearest rural locality.
