= Aleksino, Kolchuginsky District, Vladimir Oblast =

Aleksino Алексино
- Selo
- Location within Vladimir Oblast Location within Russia
- Coordinates: 56°24′N 39°20′E
- Country: Russia
- Region: Vladimir Oblast
- District: Kolchuginsky District
- Time zone: UTC+3:00

Aleksino (Russian: Алексино) is a rural locality (a selo) in Ilyinskoye Rural Settlement, Kolchuginsky District, Vladimir Oblast, Russia. The population was 16 as of 2010. There are 5 streets.

== Geography ==
Aleksino is located on the Peksha River, 18 km north of Kolchugino (the district's administrative centre) by road. Zolotukha is the nearest rural locality.
