= Glyadki =

Glyadki Глядки
- Village
- Location within Vladimir Oblast Location within Russia
- Coordinates: 56°22′N 39°32′E
- Country: Russia
- Region: Vladimir Oblast
- District: Kolchuginsky District
- Time zone: UTC+3:00

Glyadki (Russian: Глядки) is a rural locality (a village) in Bavlenskoye Rural Settlement, Kolchuginsky District, Vladimir Oblast, Russia. The population was 7 as of 2010.

== Geography ==
Glyadki is located 23 km northeast of Kolchugino (the district's administrative centre) by road. Bavleny is the nearest rural locality.
