= Korobovshchinsky =

Korobovshchinsky Коробовщинский
- Settlement
- Location within Vladimir Oblast Location within Russia
- Coordinates: 56°16′N 39°16′E
- Country: Russia
- Region: Vladimir Oblast
- District: Kolchuginsky District
- Time zone: UTC+3:00

Korobovshchinsky (Russian: Коробовщинский) is a rural locality (a settlement) in Razdolyevskoye Rural Settlement, Kolchuginsky District, Vladimir Oblast, Russia. The population was 30 as of 2010.

== Geography ==
Korobovshchinsky is located 9 km southwest of Kolchugino (the district's administrative centre) by road. Avdotyino is the nearest rural locality.
