= Prokudino, Vladimir Oblast =

Prokudino Прокудино
- Village
- Location within Vladimir Oblast Location within Russia
- Coordinates: 56°21′N 39°22′E
- Country: Russia
- Region: Vladimir Oblast
- District: Kolchuginsky District
- Time zone: UTC+3:00

Prokudino (Russian: Прокудино) is a rural locality (a village) in Ilyinskoye Rural Settlement, Kolchuginsky District, Vladimir Oblast, Russia. The population was 32 as of 2010. There are 7 streets.

== Geography ==
Prokudino is located 10 km north of Kolchugino (the district's administrative centre) by road. Davydovskoye is the nearest rural locality.
