= Ivashkovo, Kolchuginsky District, Vladimir Oblast =

Ivashkovo Ивашково
- Village
- Location within Vladimir Oblast Location within Russia
- Coordinates: 56°19′N 39°32′E
- Country: Russia
- Region: Vladimir Oblast
- District: Kolchuginsky District
- Time zone: UTC+3:00

Ivashkovo (Russian: Ивашково) is a rural locality (a village) in Yesiplevskoye Rural Settlement, Kolchuginsky District, Vladimir Oblast, Russia. The population was 1 as of 2010.

== Geography ==
Ivashkovo is located on the Ilmovka River, 18 km east of Kolchugino (the district's administrative centre) by road. Shkolny is the nearest rural locality.
