= Semendyukovo =

Semendyukovo Семендюково
- Village
- Location within Vladimir Oblast Location within Russia
- Coordinates: 56°24′N 39°35′E
- Country: Russia
- Region: Vladimir Oblast
- District: Kolchuginsky District
- Time zone: UTC+3:00

Semendyukovo (Russian: Семендюково) is a rural locality (a village) in Bavlenskoye Rural Settlement, Kolchuginsky District, Vladimir Oblast, Russia. The population was 11 as of 2010. There are 2 streets.

== Geography ==
Semendyukovo is located 21 km northeast of Kolchugino (the district's administrative centre) by road. Bavleny is the nearest rural locality.
