= Novofrolovskoye =

Novofrolovskoye Новофроловское
- Village
- Location within Vladimir Oblast Location within Russia
- Coordinates: 56°14′N 39°12′E
- Country: Russia
- Region: Vladimir Oblast
- District: Kolchuginsky District
- Time zone: UTC+3:00

Novofrolovskoye (Russian: Новофроловское) is a rural locality (a village) in Razdolyevskoye Rural Settlement, Kolchuginsky District, Vladimir Oblast, Russia. The population was 8 as of 2010. There are 6 streets.

== Geography ==
Novofrolovskoye is located 26 km southwest of Kolchugino (the district's administrative centre) by road. Beryozovaya Roshcha is the nearest rural locality.
