= Kashino, Kolchuginsky District, Vladimir Oblast =

Kashino Кашино
- Village
- Location within Vladimir Oblast Location within Russia
- Coordinates: 56°08′N 39°13′E
- Country: Russia
- Region: Vladimir Oblast
- District: Kolchuginsky District
- Time zone: UTC+3:00

Kashino (Russian: Кашино) is a rural locality (a village) in Razdolyevskoye Rural Settlement, Kolchuginsky District, Vladimir Oblast, Russia. The population was 9 as of 2010. There are 5 streets.

== Geography ==
Kashino is located 37 km south of Kolchugino (the district's administrative centre) by road. Vaulovo is the nearest rural locality.
