= Zapazhye =

Zapazhye Запажье
- Village
- Location within Vladimir Oblast Location within Russia
- Coordinates: 56°12′N 39°26′E
- Country: Russia
- Region: Vladimir Oblast
- District: Kolchuginsky District
- Time zone: UTC+3:00

Zapazhye (Russian: Запажье) is a rural locality (a village) in Razdolyevskoye Rural Settlement, Kolchuginsky District, Vladimir Oblast, Russia. The population was 3 as of 2010. There are 2 streets.

== Geography ==
Zapazhye is located on the Peksha River, 18 km south of Kolchugino (the district's administrative centre) by road. Zavalino is the nearest rural locality.
