= Beryozovaya Roshcha, Vladimir Oblast =

Beryozovaya Roshcha Берёзовая Роща
- Village
- Location within Vladimir Oblast Location within Russia
- Coordinates: 56°14′N 39°10′E
- Country: Russia
- Region: Vladimir Oblast
- District: Kolchuginsky District
- Time zone: UTC+3:00

Beryozovaya Roshcha (Russian: Берёзовая Роща) is a rural locality (a village) in Razdolyevskoye Rural Settlement, Kolchuginsky District, Vladimir Oblast, Russia. The population was 11 as of 2010. There are 2 streets.

== Geography ==
Beryozovaya Roshcha is located 23 km southwest of Kolchugino (the district's administrative centre) by road. Korobovshchina is the nearest rural locality.
