= Slugino =

Slugino Слугино
- Village
- Location within Vladimir Oblast Location within Russia
- Coordinates: 56°09′N 39°28′E
- Country: Russia
- Region: Vladimir Oblast
- District: Kolchuginsky District
- Time zone: UTC+3:00

Slugino (Russian: Слугино) is a rural locality (a village) in Razdolyevskoye Rural Settlement, Kolchuginsky District, Vladimir Oblast, Russia. The population was 3 as of 2010.

== Geography ==
Slugino is located 21 km south of Kolchugino (the district's administrative centre) by road. Pozdnyakovo is the nearest rural locality.
