= Shustino =

Shustino Шустино
- Village
- Location within Vladimir Oblast Location within Russia
- Coordinates: 56°14′N 39°22′E
- Country: Russia
- Region: Vladimir Oblast
- District: Kolchuginsky District
- Time zone: UTC+3:00

Shustino (Russian: Шустино) is a rural locality (a village) in Razdolyevskoye Rural Settlement, Kolchuginsky District, Vladimir Oblast, Russia. The population was 21 as of 2010.

== Geography ==
Shustino is located 9 km south of Kolchugino (the district's administrative centre) by road. Novy is the nearest rural locality.
