= Kudryavtsevo, Kolchuginsky District, Vladimir Oblast =

Kudryavtsevo Кудрявцево
- Village
- Location within Vladimir Oblast Location within Russia
- Coordinates: 56°11′N 39°28′E
- Country: Russia
- Region: Vladimir Oblast
- District: Kolchuginsky District
- Time zone: UTC+3:00

Kudryavtsevo (Russian: Кудрявцево) is a rural locality (a village) in Razdolyevskoye Rural Settlement, Kolchuginsky District, Vladimir Oblast, Russia. The population was 9 as of 2010. There are 3 streets.

== Geography ==
Kudryavtsevo is located 18 km southeast of Kolchugino (the district's administrative centre) by road. Troitsa is the nearest rural locality.
