= Voskresenskoye, Kolchuginsky District, Vladimir Oblast =

Voskresenskoye Воскресенское
- Selo
- Location within Vladimir Oblast Location within Russia
- Coordinates: 56°10′N 39°13′E
- Country: Russia
- Region: Vladimir Oblast
- District: Kolchuginsky District
- Time zone: UTC+3:00

Voskresenskoye (Russian: Воскресенское) is a rural locality (a selo) in Razdolyevskoye Rural Settlement, Kolchuginsky District, Vladimir Oblast, Russia. The population was 10 as of 2010. There are 2 streets.

== Geography ==
Voskresenskoye is located on the Sheredar River, 35 km southwest of Kolchugino (the district's administrative centre) by road. Ignatovo is the nearest rural locality.
