= Veliki Preslav Municipality =

Veliki Preslav Municipality Община Велики Преслав
- Municipality
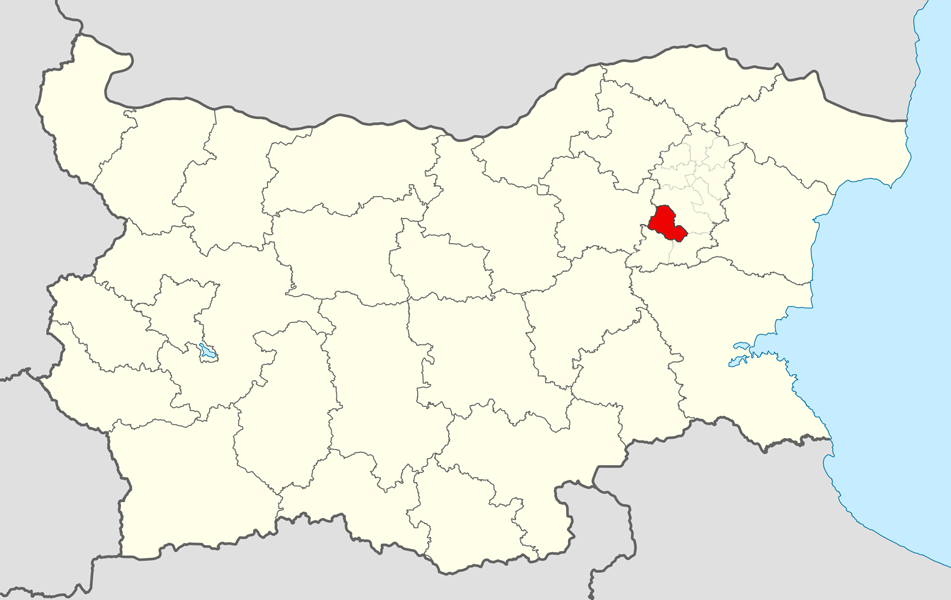
- Veliki Preslav Municipality within Bulgaria and Shumen Province.
- Coordinates: 43°10′N 26°49′E
- Country: Bulgaria
- Province (Oblast): Shumen
- Admin. centre (Obshtinski tsentar): Veliki Preslav

Area
  - Total: 277.65 km^{2} (107.20 sq mi)

Population (December 2009)
  - Total: 15,292
  - Density: 55.077/km^{2} (142.65/sq mi)
- Time zone: UTC+2 (EET)
  - Summer (DST): UTC+3 (EEST)

Veliki Preslav Municipality (Bulgarian: Община Велики Преслав; former Preslav Municipality, Bulgarian: Община Преслав) is a municipality (obshtina) in Shumen Province, Northeastern Bulgaria, located in the area of the so-called Fore-Balkan north of the eastern part of the Stara planina mountains. It is named after its administrative centre, the town of Veliki Preslav, which was one of the ancient capitals of Bulgaria.

The municipality embraces a territory of 277.65 km^{2} (107.20 sq mi) with a population of 15,292 inhabitants, as of December 2009.

== Settlements ==
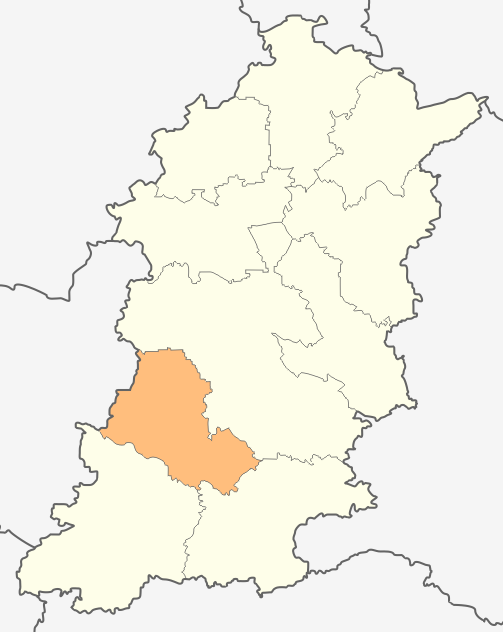
Veliki Preslav Municipality within Shumen Province

Veliki Preslav Municipality includes the following 12 places (towns are shown in bold):

Town/Village	Cyrillic	Population (December 2009)
**Veliki Preslav**	**Велики Преслав**	8,951
Dragoevo	Драгоево	983
Khan Krum	Хан Крум	387
Imrenchevo	Имренчево	422
Kochovo	Кочово	777
Milanovo	Миланово	623
Mostich	Мостич	344
Mokresh	Мокреш	310
Osmar	Осмар	364
Suha Reka	Суха река	112
Troitsa	Троица	765
Zlatar	Златар	1,254
Total		15,292

== Demography ==
The following table shows the change of the population during the last four decades.

Veliki Preslav Municipality
**Year**	1975	1985	1992	**2001**	2005	2007	2009	**2011**
**Population**	21,565	19,945	17,682	16,276	15,855	15,603	15,292	13,382
Sources: Census 2001, Census 2011, „pop-stat.mashke.org“,

=== Ethnic composition ===
According to the 2011 census, among those who answered the optional question on ethnic identification, the ethnic composition of the municipality was the following:

Ethnic group	Population	Percentage
Bulgarians	7936	65%
Turks	3078	25.2%
Roma (Gypsy)	943	7.7%
Other	157	1.3%
Undeclared	98	0.8%

==== Religion ====
According to the latest Bulgarian census of 2011, the religious composition, among those who answered the optional question on religious identification, was the following:

Religious composition of Veliki Preslav Municipality
Orthodox Christianity	60.7%
Catholicism	0.5%
Protestantism	1.0%
Islam	26.9%
No religion	3.1%
Prefer not to answer, others and indefinable	7.8%

== See also ==
- Provinces of Bulgaria
- Municipalities of Bulgaria
- List of cities and towns in Bulgaria
