= Bolshoye Grigorovo =

Bolshoye Grigorovo Большое Григорово
- Village
- Location within Vladimir Oblast Location within Russia
- Coordinates: 56°14′N 39°32′E
- Country: Russia
- Region: Vladimir Oblast
- District: Kolchuginsky District
- Time zone: UTC+3:00

Bolshoye Grigorovo (Russian: Большое Григорово) is a rural locality (a village) in Razdolyevskoye Rural Settlement, Kolchuginsky District, Vladimir Oblast, Russia. The population was 4 as of 2010.

== Geography ==
Bolshoye Grigorovo is located 16 km southeast of Kolchugino (the district's administrative centre) by road. Maloye Grigorovo is the nearest rural locality.
