= Sukmanikha =

Sukmanikha Сукманиха
- Village
- Location within Vladimir Oblast Location within Russia
- Coordinates: 56°14′N 39°28′E
- Country: Russia
- Region: Vladimir Oblast
- District: Kolchuginsky District
- Time zone: UTC+3:00

Sukmanikha (Russian: Сукманиха) is a rural locality (a village) in Razdolyevskoye Rural Settlement, Kolchuginsky District, Vladimir Oblast, Russia. The population was 35 as of 2010. There are 2 streets.

== Geography ==
Sukmanikha is located 10 km southeast of Kolchugino (the district's administrative centre) by road. Stenki is the nearest rural locality.
