= Novino =

Novino Новино
- Village
- Location within Vladimir Oblast Location within Russia
- Coordinates: 56°09′N 39°39′E
- Country: Russia
- Region: Vladimir Oblast
- District: Kolchuginsky District
- Time zone: UTC+3:00
- Website: https://novino.net

Novino (Russian: Новино) is a rural locality (a village) in Razdolyevskoye Rural Settlement, Kolchuginsky District, Vladimir Oblast, Russia. The population was 1 as of 2010.

== Geography ==
Novino is located 110 km southeast of Kolchugino (the district's administrative centre) by road. Demlevo is the nearest rural locality.
