= Skorodumka =

Skorodumka Скородумка
- Village
- Location within Vladimir Oblast Location within Russia
- Coordinates: 56°12′N 39°30′E
- Country: Russia
- Region: Vladimir Oblast
- District: Kolchuginsky District
- Time zone: UTC+3:00

Skorodumka (Russian: Скородумка) is a rural locality (a village) in Razdolyevskoye Rural Settlement, Kolchuginsky District, Vladimir Oblast, Russia. The population was 14 as of 2010.

== Geography ==
Skorodumka is located on the Ilmovka River, 15 km southeast of Kolchugino (the district's administrative centre) by road. Lavrenikha is the nearest rural locality.
