= Safonov =

Safonov (Russian: Сафонов) and Safonova (Russian: Сафонова; feminine) is a Russian surname. Notable people with the surname include:

- Andrey Safonov (b. 1964), politician from Transnistria
- Boris Safonov (1915–1942), World War II flying ace
- Dmitry Safonov (1895–1941), Soviet general
- Igor Safonov, Soviet sprint canoer
- Matvey Safonov (b. 1999), Russian footballer
- Mikhail Safonov (pilot) (1893–1924), World War I flying ace
- Oleg Safonov (b. 1960), Russian politician
- Oleksandr Safonov (b. 1991), Ukrainian football player
- Vasily Ilyich Safonov (1852–1918), Russian pianist, teacher, conductor and composer
- Yevgeni Safonov (disambiguation), several people
- Darya Safonova (b. 1981), Russian sprinter
- Elena Safonova (b. 1956), Soviet and Russian film actress
- Anna Safonova (1883–1975), maiden name of Anna Timiryova, daughter of Vasily Ilyich Safonov

== See also ==
- Safonovo
