= Lavrenikha =

Lavrenikha Лаврениха
- Village
- Location within Vladimir Oblast Location within Russia
- Coordinates: 56°12′N 39°29′E
- Country: Russia
- Region: Vladimir Oblast
- District: Kolchuginsky District
- Time zone: UTC+3:00

Lavrenikha (Russian: Лаврениха) is a rural locality (a village) in Razdolyevskoye Rural Settlement, Kolchuginsky District, Vladimir Oblast, Russia. The population was 19 as of 2010.

== Geography ==
Lavrenikha is located 15 km southeast of Kolchugino (the district's administrative centre) by road. Vishnevy is the nearest rural locality.
