= Snegiryovo =

Snegiryovo Снегирёво
- Selo
- Location within Vladimir Oblast Location within Russia
- Coordinates: 56°14′N 39°43′E
- Country: Russia
- Region: Vladimir Oblast
- District: Kolchuginsky District
- Time zone: UTC+3:00

Snegiryovo (Russian: Снегирёво) is a rural locality (a selo) in Razdolyevskoye Rural Settlement, Kolchuginsky District, Vladimir Oblast, Russia. The population was 14 as of 2010. There are 3 streets.

== Geography ==
Snegiryovo is located on the Vorsha River, 30 km southeast of Kolchugino (the district's administrative centre) by road. Marino is the nearest rural locality.
