= Gorbatovka, Vladimir Oblast =

Gorbatovka Горбатовка
- Village
- Location within Vladimir Oblast Location within Russia
- Coordinates: 56°11′N 39°39′E
- Country: Russia
- Region: Vladimir Oblast
- District: Kolchuginsky District
- Time zone: UTC+3:00

Gorbatovka (Russian: Горбатовка) is a rural locality (a village) in Razdolyevskoye Rural Settlement, Kolchuginsky District, Vladimir Oblast, Russia. The population was 14 as of 2010.

== Geography ==
Gorbatovka is located 24 km southeast of Kolchugino (the district's administrative centre) by road. Pavlovka is the nearest rural locality.
