= Toporishchevo =

Toporishchevo Топорищево
- Village
- Location within Vladimir Oblast Location within Russia
- Coordinates: 56°15′N 39°43′E
- Country: Russia
- Region: Vladimir Oblast
- District: Kolchuginsky District
- Time zone: UTC+3:00

Toporishchevo (Russian: Топорищево) is a rural locality (a village) in Razdolyevskoye Rural Settlement, Kolchuginsky District, Vladimir Oblast, Russia. The population was 4 as of 2010.

== Geography ==
Toporishchevo is located on the Tsiminka River, 33 km east of Kolchugino (the district's administrative centre) by road. Novosekovo is the nearest rural locality.
