= Dyakonovo, Kolchuginsky District, Vladimir Oblast =

Dyakonovo Дьяконово
- Village
- Location within Vladimir Oblast Location within Russia
- Coordinates: 56°18′N 39°11′E
- Country: Russia
- Region: Vladimir Oblast
- District: Kolchuginsky District
- Time zone: UTC+3:00

Dyakonovo (Russian: Дьяконово) is a rural locality (a village) in Florishchinskoye Rural Settlement, Kolchuginsky District, Vladimir Oblast, Russia. The population was 2 as of 2010. There are 2 streets.

== Geography ==
Dyakonovo is located 21 km west of Kolchugino (the district's administrative centre) by road. Florishchi is the nearest rural locality.
