= Marino, Kolchuginsky District, Vladimir Oblast =

Marino Марино
- Village
- Location within Vladimir Oblast Location within Russia
- Coordinates: 56°20′N 39°21′E
- Country: Russia
- Region: Vladimir Oblast
- District: Kolchuginsky District
- Time zone: UTC+3:00

Marino (Russian: Марино) is a rural locality (a village) in Razdolyevskoye Rural Settlement, Kolchuginsky District, Vladimir Oblast, Russia. The population was 9 as of 2010.

== Geography ==
Marino is located on the Vorsha River, 32 km east of Kolchugino (the district's administrative centre) by road. Snegiryovo is the nearest rural locality.
