= Ulyanikha =

Ulyanikha Ульяниха
- Village
- Location within Vladimir Oblast Location within Russia
- Coordinates: 56°16′N 39°25′E
- Country: Russia
- Region: Vladimir Oblast
- District: Kolchuginsky District
- Time zone: UTC+3:00

Ulyanikha (Russian: Ульяниха) is a rural locality (a village) in Razdolyevskoye Rural Settlement, Kolchuginsky District, Vladimir Oblast, Russia. The population was 125 as of 2010.

== Geography ==
Ulyanikha is located on the Peksha River, 5 km southeast of Kolchugino (the district's administrative centre) by road. Novoselka is the nearest rural locality.
