= Pozdnyakovo, Kolchuginsky District, Vladimir Oblast =

Pozdnyakovo Поздняково
- Village
- Location within Vladimir Oblast Location within Russia
- Coordinates: 56°09′N 39°29′E
- Country: Russia
- Region: Vladimir Oblast
- District: Kolchuginsky District
- Time zone: UTC+3:00

Pozdnyakovo (Russian: Поздняково) is a rural locality (a village) in Razdolyevskoye Rural Settlement, Kolchuginsky District, Vladimir Oblast, Russia. The population was 6 as of 2010. There are 3 streets.

== Geography ==
Pozdnyakovo is located on the Peksha River, 20 kilometres (12 mi) south of Kolchugino (the district's administrative centre) by road. Slugino is the nearest rural locality.
