= Novofetinino =

Novofetinino Новофетинино
- Village
- Location within Vladimir Oblast Location within Russia
- Coordinates: 56°13′N 39°16′E
- Country: Russia
- Region: Vladimir Oblast
- District: Kolchuginsky District
- Time zone: UTC+3:00

Novofetinino (Russian: Новофетинино) is a rural locality (a village) in Razdolyevskoye Rural Settlement, Kolchuginsky District, Vladimir Oblast, Russia. The population was 9 as of 2010. There are 5 streets.

== Geography ==
Novofetinino is located 13 km southwest of Kolchugino (the district's administrative centre) by road. Miltino is the nearest rural locality.
