= Novosyolka (Yesiplevskoye Rural Settlement), Kolchuginsky District, Vladimir Oblast =

Novosyolka Новосёлка
- Village
- Location within Vladimir Oblast Location within Russia
- Coordinates: 56°17′N 39°32′E
- Country: Russia
- Region: Vladimir Oblast
- District: Kolchuginsky District
- Time zone: UTC+3:00

Novosyolka (Russian: Новосёлка) is a rural locality (a village) in Yesiplevskoye Rural Settlement, Kolchuginsky District, Vladimir Oblast, Russia. The population was 61 as of 2010.

== Geography ==
The village is located on the Ilmovka River, 3 km south from Yesiplevo, 12 km east Kolchugino.
