= Yeltsino =

Yeltsino Ельцино
- Selo
- Location within Vladimir Oblast Location within Russia
- Coordinates: 56°12′N 39°36′E
- Country: Russia
- Region: Vladimir Oblast
- District: Kolchuginsky District
- Time zone: UTC+3:00

Yeltsino (Russian: Ельцино) is a rural locality (a selo) in Razdolyevskoye Rural Settlement, Kolchuginsky District, Vladimir Oblast, Russia. The population was 112 as of 2010. There are 4 streets.

== Geography ==
Yeltsino is located 20 km southeast of Kolchugino (the district's administrative centre) by road. Gridenka is the nearest rural locality.
