= Zavalino =

Zavalino Завалино
- Selo
- Location within Vladimir Oblast Location within Russia
- Coordinates: 56°12′N 39°27′E
- Country: Russia
- Region: Vladimir Oblast
- District: Kolchuginsky District
- Time zone: UTC+3:00

Zavalino (Russian: Завалино) is a rural locality (a selo) in Razdolyevskoye Rural Settlement, Kolchuginsky District, Vladimir Oblast, Russia. The population was 23 as of 2010.

== Geography ==
Zavalino is located 16 km southeast of Kolchugino (the district's administrative centre) by road. Vishnevy is the nearest rural locality.
