= Yakovlevo, Kolchuginsky District, Vladimir Oblast =

Yakovlevo Яковлево
- Village
- Location within Vladimir Oblast Location within Russia
- Coordinates: 56°13′N 39°08′E
- Country: Russia
- Region: Vladimir Oblast
- District: Kolchuginsky District
- Time zone: UTC+3:00

Yakovlevo (Russian: Яковлево) is a rural locality (a village) in Razdolyevskoye Rural Settlement, Kolchuginsky District, Vladimir Oblast, Russia. The population was 4 as of 2010. There are 3 streets.

== Geography ==
Yakovlevo is located 23 km southwest of Kolchugino (the district's administrative centre) by road. Khlamostovo is the nearest rural locality.
