= Razdolye, Vladimir Oblast =

Razdolye Раздолье
- Settlement
- Location within Vladimir Oblast Location within Russia
- Coordinates: 56°16′N 39°27′E
- Country: Russia
- Region: Vladimir Oblast
- District: Kolchuginsky District
- Time zone: UTC+3:00

Razdolye (Russian: Раздолье) is a rural locality (a settlement) and the administrative center of Razdolyevskoye Rural Settlement, Kolchuginsky District, Vladimir Oblast, Russia. The population was 836 as of 2010. There are 8 streets.

== Geography ==
Razdolye is located 7 km southeast of Kolchugino (the district's administrative centre) by road. Stenki is the nearest rural locality.
