= Panteleyevo, Kolchuginsky District, Vladimir Oblast =

Panteleyevo Пантелеево
- Village
- Location within Vladimir Oblast Location within Russia
- Coordinates: 56°12′N 39°24′E
- Country: Russia
- Region: Vladimir Oblast
- District: Kolchuginsky District
- Time zone: UTC+3:00

Panteleyevo (Russian: Пантелеево) is a rural locality (a village) in Razdolyevskoye Rural Settlement, Kolchuginsky District, Vladimir Oblast, Russia. The population was 28 as of 2010.

== Geography ==
Panteleyevo is located 19 km south of Kolchugino (the district's administrative centre) by road. Miklyaikha is the nearest rural locality.
