= Korobovshchina =

Korobovshchina Коробовщина
- Selo
- Location within Vladimir Oblast Location within Russia
- Coordinates: 56°14′N 39°09′E
- Country: Russia
- Region: Vladimir Oblast
- District: Kolchuginsky District
- Time zone: UTC+3:00

Korobovshchina (Russian: Коробовщина) is a rural locality (a selo) in Razdolyevskoye Rural Settlement, Kolchuginsky District, Vladimir Oblast, Russia. The population was 16 as of 2010. There are 13 streets.

== Geography ==
Korobovshchina is located 22 km southwest of Kolchugino (the district's administrative centre) by road. Beryozovaya Roshcha is the nearest rural locality.
