= Zinovyevo, Kolchuginsky District, Vladimir Oblast =

Zinovyevo Зиновьево
- Selo
- Location within Vladimir Oblast Location within Russia
- Coordinates: 56°09′N 39°25′E
- Country: Russia
- Region: Vladimir Oblast
- District: Kolchuginsky District
- Time zone: UTC+3:00

Zinovyevo (Russian: Зиновьево) is a rural locality (a selo) in Razdolyevskoye Rural Settlement, Kolchuginsky District, Vladimir Oblast, Russia. The population was 93 as of 2010. There are 6 streets.

== Geography ==
Zinovyevo is located 27 km south of Kolchugino (the district's administrative centre) by road. Safonovo is the nearest rural locality.
