= Safonovo, Kolchuginsky District, Vladimir Oblast =

Safonovo Сафоново
- Village
- Location within Vladimir Oblast Location within Russia
- Coordinates: 56°10′N 39°22′E
- Country: Russia
- Region: Vladimir Oblast
- District: Kolchuginsky District
- Time zone: UTC+3:00

Safonovo (Russian: Сафоново) is a rural locality (a village) in Razdolyevskoye Rural Settlement, Kolchuginsky District, Vladimir Oblast, Russia. The population was 5 as of 2010. There are 4 streets.

== Geography ==
Safonovo is located 24 km south of Kolchugino (the district's administrative centre) by road. Koskovka is the nearest rural locality.
