= Troitsa, Vladimir Oblast =

Troitsa Троица
- Village
- Location within Vladimir Oblast Location within Russia
- Coordinates: 56°11′N 39°30′E
- Country: Russia
- Region: Vladimir Oblast
- District: Kolchuginsky District
- Time zone: UTC+3:00

Troitsa (Russian: Троица) is a village in Razdolyevskoye Rural Settlement, Kolchuginsky District, Vladimir Oblast, Russia. The population was 11 as of 2010.

== Geography ==
Troitsa is located on the Peksha River, 20 km southeast of Kolchugino (the district's administrative centre) by road. Kudryavtsevo is the nearest rural locality.
