= Vorontsovo, Kolchuginsky District, Vladimir Oblast =

Vorontsovo Воронцово
- Village
- Location within Vladimir Oblast Location within Russia
- Coordinates: 56°15′N 39°17′E
- Country: Russia
- Region: Vladimir Oblast
- District: Kolchuginsky District
- Time zone: UTC+3:00

Vorontsovo (Russian: Воронцово) is a rural locality (a village) in Razdolyevskoye Rural Settlement, Kolchuginsky District, Vladimir Oblast, Russia. The population was 2 as of 2010. There are 4 streets.

== Geography ==
Vorontsovo is located 12 km southwest of Kolchugino (the district's administrative centre) by road. Korobovshchinsky is the nearest rural locality.
