= Avdotyino, Kolchuginsky District, Vladimir Oblast =

Avdotyino Авдотьино
- Village
- Location within Vladimir Oblast Location within Russia
- Coordinates: 56°16′N 39°17′E
- Country: Russia
- Region: Vladimir Oblast
- District: Kolchuginsky District
- Time zone: UTC+3:00

Avdotyino (Russian: Авдотьино) is a rural locality (a village) in Razdolyevskoye Rural Settlement of Kolchuginsky District, Vladimir Oblast, Russia. The population was 3 as of 2010. There are 2 streets.

== Geography ==
Avdotyino is located 8 km southwest of Kolchugino (the district's administrative centre) by road. Korobovshchinsky is the nearest rural locality.
