= Novosilka =

Novosilka (Ukrainian: Новосілка) is the name of several localities in Ukraine:

- Novosilka, Volnovakha Raion, Donetsk Oblast
- Novosilka, Buchach urban hromada, Chortkiv Raion, Ternopil Oblast
- Novosilka, Hrymailiv settlement hromada, Chortkiv Raion, Ternopil Oblast
- Novosilka, Zalishchyky urban hromada, Chortkiv Raion, Ternopil Oblast
- Novosilka, Pidhaitsi urban hromada, Ternopil Raion, Ternopil Oblast
- Novosilka, Skalat urban hromada, Ternopil Raion, Ternopil Oblast

== See also ==
- Novosilka Castle
- Velyka Novosilka
- Novosyolka (disambiguation)
