= Dyakonovo, Vyaznikovsky District, Vladimir Oblast =

Dyakonovo Дьяконово
- Village
- Location within Vladimir Oblast Location within Russia
- Coordinates: 56°09′N 41°42′E
- Country: Russia
- Region: Vladimir Oblast
- District: Vyaznikovsky District
- Time zone: UTC+3:00

Dyakonovo (Russian: Дьяконово) is a rural locality (a village) in Styopantsevskoye Rural Settlement, Vyaznikovsky District, Vladimir Oblast, Russia. The population was 15 as of 2010.

== Geography ==
Dyakonovo is located 35 km southwest of Vyazniki (the district's administrative centre) by road. Korovintsevo is the nearest rural locality.
