= Vorontsovo, Zavolzhsky District, Ivanovo Oblast =

Vorontsovo Воронцово
- Village
- Location within Ivanovo Oblast Location within Russia
- Coordinates: 57°25′N 41°51′E
- Country: Russia
- Region: Ivanovo Oblast
- District: Zavolzhsky District
- Time zone: UTC+3:00

Vorontsovo (Russian: Воронцово) is a rural locality (a village) in Zavolzhsky District, Ivanovo Oblast, Russia. Population: 14 (2010 census);

== Geography ==
This rural locality is located 18 km from Zavolzhsk (the district's administrative centre), 72 km from Ivanovo (capital of Ivanovo Oblast) and 315 km from Moscow. Logintsevo is the nearest rural locality.
