= Novosyolka, Fyodorovsky District, Republic of Bashkortostan =

Novosyolka Новосёлка
- Selo
- Location within Bashkortostan Location within Russia
- Coordinates: 52°58′N 55°06′E
- Country: Russia
- Region: Bashkortostan
- District: Fyodorovsky District
- Time zone: UTC+5:00

Novosyolka (Russian: Новосёлка) is a rural locality (a selo) in Deniskinsky Selsoviet, Fyodorovsky District, Bashkortostan, Russia. The population was 558 as of 2010. There are 8 streets.

== Geography ==
Novosyolka is located 26 km south of Fyodorovka (the district's administrative centre) by road. Kiryushkino is the nearest rural locality.
