= Novosyolka (Slednevskoye Rural Settlement), Alexandrovsky District, Vladimir Oblast =

Novosyolka Новосёлка
- Village
- Location within Vladimir Oblast Location within Russia
- Coordinates: 56°26′N 38°43′E
- Country: Russia
- Region: Vladimir Oblast
- District: Alexandrovsky District
- Time zone: UTC+3:00

Novosyolka (Russian: Новосёлка) is a rural locality (a village) in Slednevskoye Rural Settlement, Alexandrovsky District, Vladimir Oblast, Russia. The population was 12 as of 2010. There are 3 streets.

== Geography ==
The village is located 13 km north-east from Slednevo, 6 km north from Alexandrov.
