= Novosyolka (Andreyevskoye Rural Settlement), Alexandrovsky District, Vladimir Oblast =

Novosyolka Новосёлка
- Selo
- Location within Vladimir Oblast Location within Russia
- Coordinates: 56°22′N 39°03′E
- Country: Russia
- Region: Vladimir Oblast
- District: Alexandrovsky District
- Time zone: UTC+3:00

Novosyolka (Russian: Новосёлка) is a rural locality (a selo) in Andreyevskoye Rural Settlement, Alexandrovsky District, Vladimir Oblast, Russia. The population was 147 as of 2010. There are 3 streets.

== Geography ==
The village is located 7 km south-east from Andreyevskoye.
