= Dyakonovo, Muromsky District, Vladimir Oblast =

Dyakonovo Дьяконово
- Village
- Location within Vladimir Oblast Location within Russia
- Coordinates: 55°42′N 41°52′E
- Country: Russia
- Region: Vladimir Oblast
- District: Muromsky District
- Time zone: UTC+3:00

Dyakonovo (Russian: Дья́коново) is a rural locality (a village) in Borisoglebskoye Rural Settlement, Muromsky District, Vladimir Oblast, Russia. The population was 14 as of 2010.

== Geography ==
Dyakonovo is located on the Morozimo River, 31 km northwest of Murom (the district's administrative centre) by road. Savanchakovo is the nearest rural locality.
