= Zinovyevo, Alexandrovsky District, Vladimir Oblast =

Zinovyevo Зиновьево
- Selo
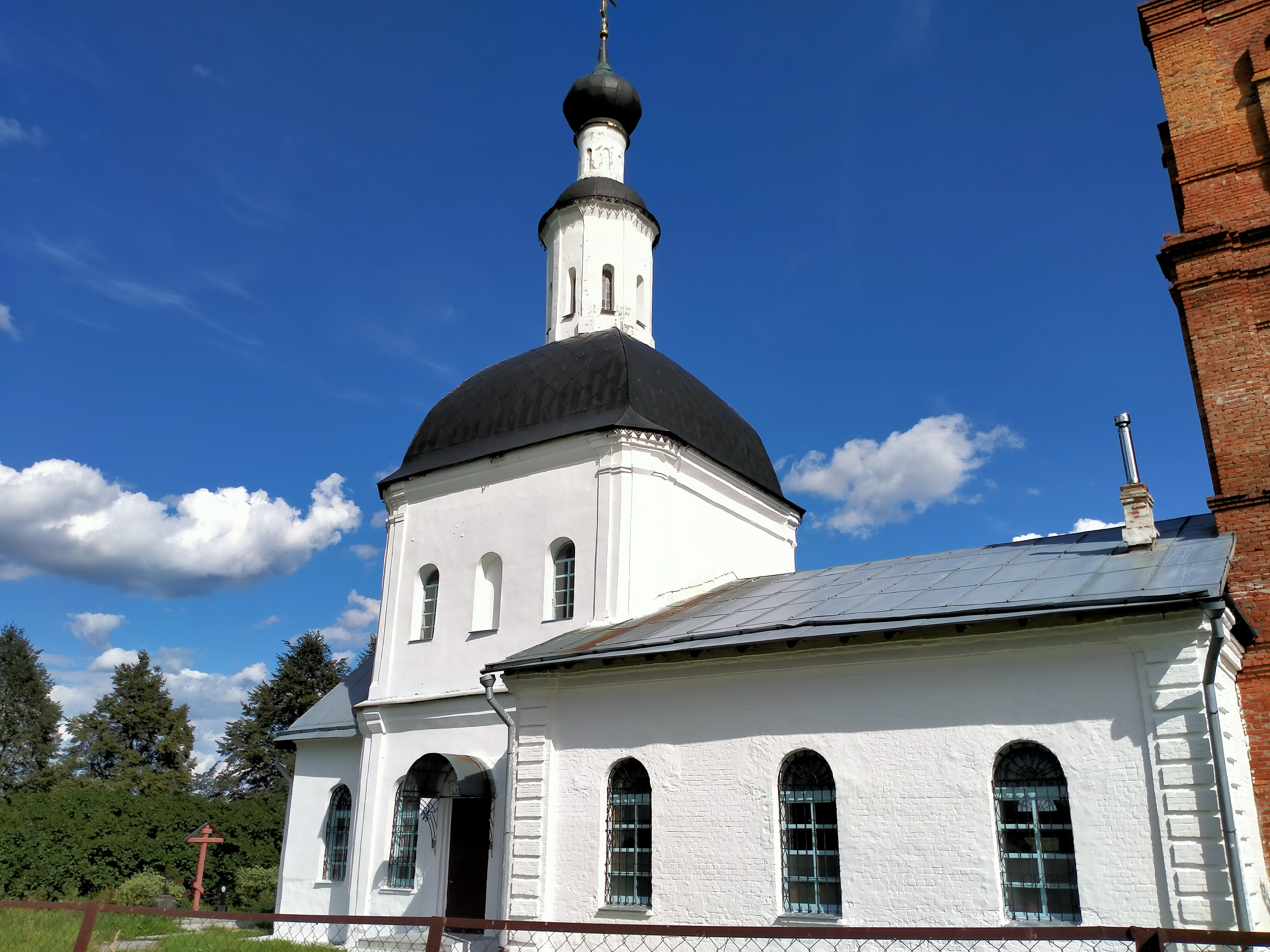
- Intercession Church in Zinovyevo

- Location within Vladimir Oblast Location within Russia
- Coordinates: 56°22′N 39°00′E
- Country: Russia
- Region: Vladimir Oblast
- District: Alexandrovsky District
- Time zone: UTC+3:00

Zinovyevo (Russian: Зиновьево) is a rural locality (a selo) in Andreyevskoye Rural Settlement, Alexandrovsky District, Vladimir Oblast, Russia. The population was 6 as of 2010.

== Geography ==
Zinovyevo is located 21 km west of Alexandrov (the district's administrative centre) by road. Kudrino is the nearest rural locality.
