= Vorontsovo, Puchezhsky District, Ivanovo Oblast =

Vorontsovo Воронцово
- Village
- Location within Ivanovo Oblast Location within Russia
- Coordinates: 57°00′N 43°03′E
- Country: Russia
- Region: Ivanovo Oblast
- District: Puchezhsky District
- Time zone: UTC+3:00

Vorontsovo (Russian: Воронцово) is a rural locality (a selo) in Puchezhsky District, Ivanovo Oblast, Russia. Population: 8 (2010 census);

== Geography ==
This rural locality is located 7 kilometres (4.3 mi) from Puchezh (the district's administrative centre), 127 kilometres (79 mi) from Ivanovo (capital of Ivanovo Oblast) and 358 kilometres (222 mi) from Moscow. Vandyshikha is the nearest rural locality.
