= Vorontsovo, Kursk Oblast =

Rural locality in Kursk Oblast, Russia

Vorontsovo Воронцово
- Village
- Interactive map of Vorontsovo
- Location of Vorontsovo Vorontsovo (Kursk Oblast)
- Coordinates: 51°43′07″N 36°29′43″E
- Country: Russia
- Federal subject: Kursk Oblast
- Administrative district: Kursky District
- SelsovietSelsoviet: Besedinsky
- Elevation: 166 m (545 ft)

Population (2010 Census)
  - Total: 224
  - Estimate (2010): 224 (0%)

Municipal status
  - Municipal district: Kursky Municipal District
  - Rural settlement: Besedinsky Selsoviet Rural Settlement
- Time zone: UTC+3 (MSK)
- Postal code: 305501
- Dialing code: +7 4712
- OKTMO ID: 38620408126
- Website: besedino.rkursk.ru

Vorontsovo (Russian: Воронцово) is a rural locality (Russian: деревня, lit. 'village') in Besedinsky Selsoviet Rural Settlement, Kursky District, Kursk Oblast, Russia. Population: 224 (2010 census); 254 (2002 census);

== Geography ==
The village is located on the Rat River (a right tributary of the Seym), 106 km from the Russia–Ukraine border, 15 km east of the district center – the town Kursk, 1 km from the selsoviet center – Besedino.

Climate

Vorontsovo has a warm-summer humid continental climate (Dfb in the Köppen climate classification).

== Transport ==
Vorontsovo is located 1 km from the federal route P-298 (Kursk – Voronezh – P-22 "Kaspy" Highway; a part of the European route E38), 7.5 km from the road of regional importance 38K-016 (Kursk – Kastornoye), 8 km from the nearest railway station Otreshkovo (railway line Kursk – 146 km).

The rural locality is situated 15 km from Kursk Vostochny Airport, 118 km from Belgorod International Airport and 190 km from Voronezh Peter the Great Airport.
