= Avdotyino, Mozhaysky District, Moscow Oblast =

Avdotyino Авдотьино
- Village
- Location within Moscow Oblast Location within Russia
- Coordinates: 55°39′N 35°50′E
- Country: Russia
- Region: Moscow Oblast
- District: Mozhaysky District
- Time zone: UTC+3:00

Avdotyino (Russian: Авдотьино) is a rural locality (a village) in Goretovskoye Rural Settlement of Mozhaysky District, Moscow Oblast, Russia. The population was 7 as of 2010. There are 3 streets.

== Geography ==
The village is located on the left bank of the Iskona River, 24 km northwest of Mozhaysk (the district's administrative centre) by road. Pereshchapovo is the nearest rural locality.
