= Avdotyino, Kovrovsky District, Vladimir Oblast =

Avdotyino Авдотьино
- Village
- Location within Vladimir Oblast Location within Russia
- Coordinates: 56°27′N 41°13′E
- Country: Russia
- Region: Vladimir Oblast
- District: Kovrovsky District
- Time zone: UTC+3:00

Avdotyino (Russian: Авдотьино) is a rural locality (a village) in Malyginskoye Rural Settlement, Kovrovsky District, Vladimir Oblast, Russia. The population was 62 as of 2010.

== Geography ==
Avdotyino is located 16 km north of Kovrov (the district's administrative centre) by road. Shirokovo is the nearest rural locality.
