= Vorontsovo, Sheksninsky District, Vologda Oblast =

Vorontsovo Воронцово
- Village
- Location within Vologda Oblast Location within Russia
- Coordinates: 59°00′N 39°02′E
- Country: Russia
- Region: Vologda Oblast
- District: Sheksninsky District
- Time zone: UTC+3:00

Vorontsovo (Russian: Воронцово) is a rural locality (a village) in Fominskoye Rural Settlement, Sheksninsky District, Vologda Oblast, Russia. The population was 17 as of 2002.

February 20th, 2012.

== Geography ==
Vorontsovo is located 46 km southeast of Sheksna (the district's administrative centre) by road. Aleksino is the nearest rural locality.
