= Vorontsovo, Ilyinsky District, Ivanovo Oblast =

Vorontsovo Воронцово
- Village
- Location within Ivanovo Oblast Location within Russia
- Coordinates: 56°51′N 39°55′E
- Country: Russia
- Region: Ivanovo Oblast
- District: Ilyinsky District
- Time zone: UTC+3:00

Vorontsovo (Russian: Воронцово) is a rural locality (a village) in Ilyinsky District, Ivanovo Oblast, Russia. Population: 24 (2010 census); 26 (2002 census);

== Geography ==
This rural locality is located 16 kilometres (9.9 mi) from Ilyinskoye-Khovanskoye (the district's administrative centre), 66 kilometres (41 mi) from Ivanovo (capital of Ivanovo Oblast) and 186 kilometres (116 mi) from Moscow. Redtsyno is the nearest rural locality.
