= Vorontsovo, Cherepovetsky District, Vologda Oblast =

Vorontsovo Воронцово
- Village
- Location within Vologda Oblast Location within Russia
- Coordinates: 59°39′N 37°35′E
- Country: Russia
- Region: Vologda Oblast
- District: Cherepovetsky District
- Time zone: UTC+3:00

Vorontsovo (Russian: Воронцово) is a rural locality (a village) in Voskresenskoye Rural Settlement, Cherepovetsky District, Vologda Oblast, Russia. The population was 1 as of 2002.

== Geography ==
Vorontsovo is located 75 km northwest of Cherepovets (the district's administrative centre) by road. Popovo is the nearest rural locality.
