= Vorontsovo, Suzdalsky District, Vladimir Oblast =

Vorontsovo Воронцово
- Village
- Location within Vladimir Oblast Location within Russia
- Coordinates: 56°18′N 40°09′E
- Country: Russia
- Region: Vladimir Oblast
- District: Suzdalsky District
- Time zone: UTC+3:00

Vorontsovo (Russian: Воронцово) is a rural locality (a village) in Novoalexandrovskoye Rural Settlement, Suzdalsky District, Vladimir Oblast, Russia. The population was 3 as of 2010.

== Geography ==
Vorontsovo is located on the Kolochka River, 29 km southwest of Suzdal (the district's administrative centre) by road. Goloventsino is the nearest rural locality.
