= Panteleyevo, Kovrovsky District, Vladimir Oblast =

Panteleyevo Пантелеево
- Selo
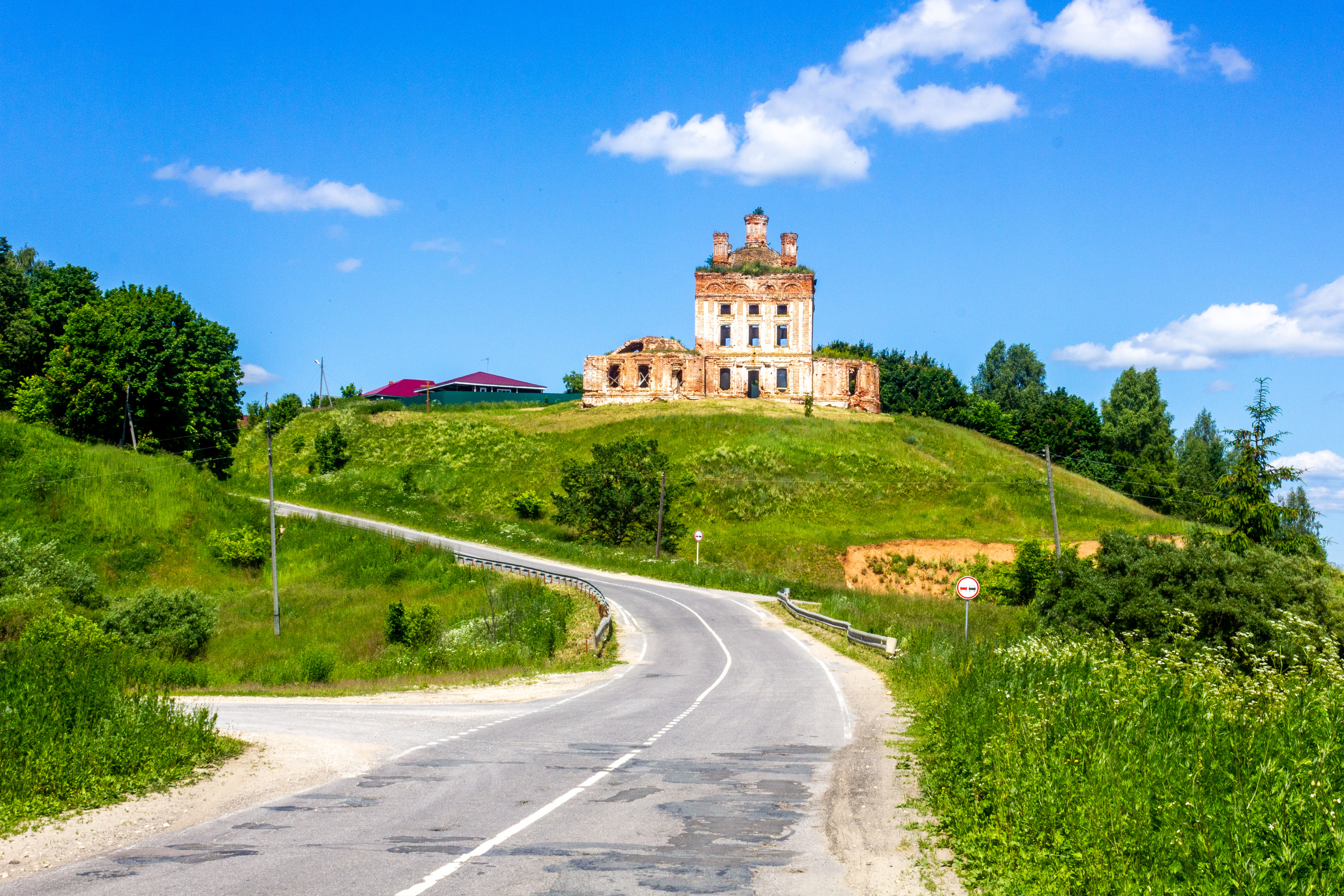
- Church of the Ascension in Panteleyevo

- Location within Vladimir Oblast Location within Russia
- Coordinates: 56°27′N 41°50′E
- Country: Russia
- Region: Vladimir Oblast
- District: Kovrovsky District
- Time zone: UTC+3:00

Panteleyevo (Russian: Пантелеево) is a rural locality (a selo) in Klyazminskoye Rural Settlement, Kovrovsky District, Vladimir Oblast, Russia. The population was 219 as of 2010. There are 3 streets.

== Geography ==
Panteleyevo is located 41 km east of Kovrov (the district's administrative centre) by road. Seltso is the nearest rural locality.
