= Dyakonovo, Mezhdurechensky District, Vologda Oblast =

Dyakonovo Дьяконово
- Village
- Location within Vologda Oblast Location within Russia
- Coordinates: 59°09′N 40°38′E
- Country: Russia
- Region: Vologda Oblast
- District: Mezhdurechensky District
- Time zone: UTC+3:00

Dyakonovo (Russian: Дьяконово) is a rural locality (a village) in Botanovskoye Rural Settlement, Mezhdurechensky District, Vologda Oblast, Russia. The population was 11 as of 2002.

== Geography ==
Dyakonovo is located 33 km southwest of Shuyskoye (the district's administrative centre) by road. Slavyanka is the nearest rural locality.
