= Troitsa, Perm Krai =

Troitsa Троица
- Selo
- Location within Perm Krai Location within Russia
- Coordinates: 57°59′N 56°47′E
- Country: Russia
- Region: Perm Krai
- District: Permsky District
- Time zone: UTC+5:00

Troitsa (Russian: Троица) is a rural locality (a selo) in Sylvenskoye Rural Settlement, Permsky District, Perm Krai, Russia. The population was 385 as of 2010. There are 49 streets.

== Geography ==
Troitsa is located 41 km east of Perm (the district's administrative centre) by road. Bulanki is the nearest rural locality.
