= Vorontsovo, Komsomolsky District, Ivanovo Oblast =

Vorontsovo Воронцово
- Village
- Location within Ivanovo Oblast Location within Russia
- Coordinates: 56°58′N 40°31′E
- Country: Russia
- Region: Ivanovo Oblast
- District: Komsomolsky District
- Time zone: UTC+3:00

Vorontsovo (Russian: Воронцово) is a rural locality (a village) in Komsomolsky District, Ivanovo Oblast, Russia. Population: 80 (2010 census);

== Geography ==
This rural locality is located 10 kilometres (6.2 mi) from Komsomolsk (the district's administrative centre), 27 kilometres (17 mi) from Ivanovo (capital of Ivanovo Oblast) and 223 kilometres (139 mi) from Moscow. Kuleberyevo is the nearest rural locality.
