= Novosyolka, Vyaznikovsky District, Vladimir Oblast =

Novosyolka Новосёлка
- Village
- Location within Vladimir Oblast Location within Russia
- Coordinates: 56°21′N 41°56′E
- Country: Russia
- Region: Vladimir Oblast
- District: Vyaznikovsky District
- Time zone: UTC+3:00

Novosyolka (Russian: Новосёлка) is a rural locality (a village) in Mstyora Urban Settlement, Vyaznikovsky District, Vladimir Oblast, Russia. The population was 97 as of 2010.

== Geography ==
Novosyolka is located 23 km northwest of Vyazniki (the district's administrative centre) by road. Zarechny is the nearest rural locality.
