= Safonovo, Mezensky District, Arkhangelsk Oblast =

Safonovo Сафоново
- Village
- Location within Arkhangelsk Oblast Location within Russia
- Coordinates: 65°40′N 47°41′E
- Country: Russia
- Region: Arkhangelsk Oblast
- District: Mezensky District
- Time zone: UTC+3:00

Safonovo (Russian: Сафоново) is a rural locality (a village) and the administrative center of Safonovskoye Rural Settlement of Mezensky District, Arkhangelsk Oblast, Russia. The population was 113 as of 2010. There are 13 streets.

== Geography ==
It is located on the Pyoza River, 224 km east of Mezen (the district's administrative centre) by road.

== Population ==
Population by year
2002	2010	2012
207	113	149
