= Novosyolka, Suzdalsky District, Vladimir Oblast =

Novosyolka Новосёлка
- Village
- Location within Vladimir Oblast Location within Russia
- Coordinates: 56°13′N 40°12′E
- Country: Russia
- Region: Vladimir Oblast
- District: Suzdalsky District
- Time zone: UTC+3:00

Novosyolka (Russian: Новосёлка) is a rural locality (a village) in Novoalexandrovskoye Rural Settlement, Suzdalsky District, Vladimir Oblast, Russia. The population was 10 as of 2010. There are 3 streets.

== Geography ==
Novosyolka is located 4 km west from Novoalexandrovo, 33 km southwest of Suzdal (the district's administrative centre) by road. Pustoy Yaroslavl is the nearest rural locality.
