= Novosyolka Nerlskaya =

Novosyolka Nerlskaya Новосёлка Нерльская
- Selo
- Location within Vladimir Oblast Location within Russia
- Coordinates: 56°25′N 40°31′E
- Country: Russia
- Region: Vladimir Oblast
- District: Suzdalsky District
- Elevation: 108 m (354 ft)
- Time zone: UTC+3:00
- Postal code: 601293

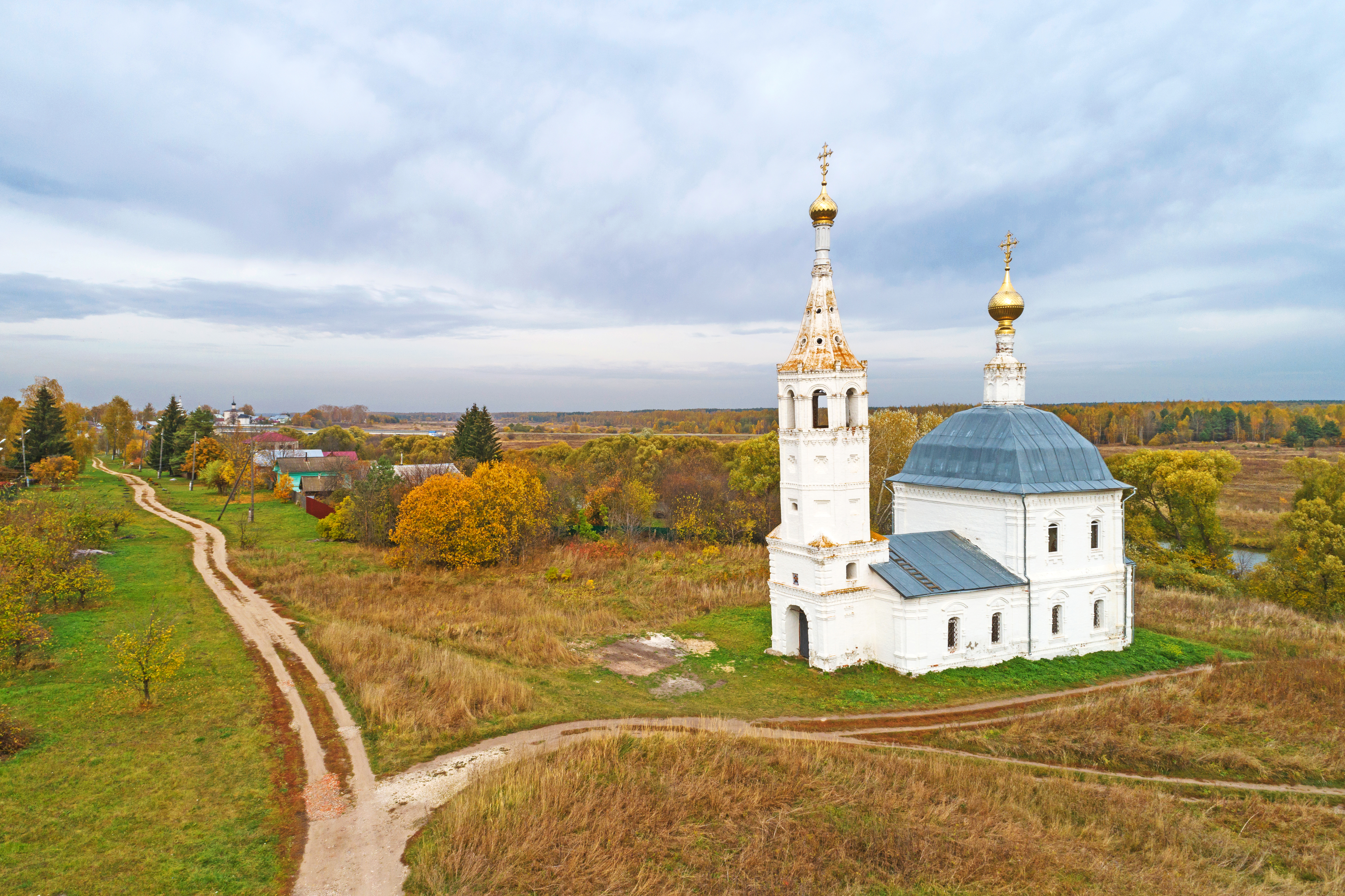
Resurrection Church in Novosyolka Nerlskaya

Novosyolka Nerlskaya (Russian: Новосёлка Нерльская) is a rural locality (a selo) in Seletskoye Rural Settlement, Suzdalsky District, Vladimir Oblast, Russia. The population was 52 as of 2022. There are 8 streets.

== Geography ==
Novosyolka Nerlskaya is located on the Nerl River, 8 km east of Suzdal (the district's administrative centre) by road. Kideksha is the nearest rural locality.
