= Avdotyino, Domodedovo, Moscow Oblast =

Avdotyino Авдотьино
- Village
- Location within Moscow Oblast Location within Russia
- Coordinates: 55°25′N 37°43′E
- Country: Russia
- Region: Moscow Oblast
- District: Domodedovsky District
- Time zone: UTC+3:00

Avdotyino (Russian: Авдотьино) is a rural locality (a village) in Domodedovo District of Domodedovsky District, Moscow Oblast, Russia. The population was 152 as of 2010. There are 15 streets.

== Geography ==
Avdotyino is located 5 km southwest of Domodedovo (the district's administrative centre) by road. Domodedovo is the nearest rural locality.
