= Avdotyino, Yuryev-Polsky District, Vladimir Oblast =

Avdotyino Авдотьино
- Village
- Location within Vladimir Oblast Location within Russia
- Coordinates: 56°18′N 39°49′E
- Country: Russia
- Region: Vladimir Oblast
- District: Yuryev-Polsky District
- Time zone: UTC+3:00

Avdotyino (Russian: Авдотьино) is a rural locality (a selo) in Krasnoselskoye Rural Settlement of Yuryev-Polsky District, Vladimir Oblast, Russia. The population was 197 as of 2010.

== Geography ==
Avdotyino is located 27 km southeast of Yuryev-Polsky (the district's administrative centre) by road. Karandyshevo is the nearest rural locality.
