= Novosyolka, Mezhdurechensky District, Vologda Oblast =

Novosyolka Новосёлка
- Village
- Location within Vologda Oblast Location within Russia
- Coordinates: 59°11′N 40°42′E
- Country: Russia
- Region: Vologda Oblast
- District: Mezhdurechensky District
- Time zone: UTC+3:00

Novosyolka (Russian: Новосёлка) is a rural locality (a village) in Botanovskoye Rural Settlement, Mezhdurechensky District, Vologda Oblast, Russia. The population was 1 as of 2002.

== Geography ==
Novosyolka is located 31 km southwest of Shuyskoye (the district's administrative centre) by road. Pazukhino is the nearest rural locality.
