= Novosyolka, Karaidelsky District, Republic of Bashkortostan =

Novosyolka Новосёлка
- Village
- Location within Bashkortostan Location within Russia
- Coordinates: 55°51′N 56°57′E
- Country: Russia
- Region: Bashkortostan
- District: Karaidelsky District
- Time zone: UTC+5:00

Novosyolka (Russian: Новосёлка) is a rural locality (a village) in Karaidelsky Selsoviet, Karaidelsky District, Bashkortostan, Russia. The population was 24 as of 2010. There are 10 streets.

== Geography ==
Novosyolka is located 7 km northeast of Karaidel (the district's administrative centre) by road. Karaidel is the nearest rural locality.
