= Vorontsovo, Rodnikovsky District, Ivanovo Oblast =

Vorontsovo Воронцово
- Village
- Location within Ivanovo Oblast Location within Russia
- Coordinates: 57°08′N 41°42′E
- Country: Russia
- Region: Ivanovo Oblast
- District: Rodnikovsky District
- Time zone: UTC+3:00

Vorontsovo (Russian: Воронцово) is a rural locality (a selo) in Rodnikovsky District, Ivanovo Oblast, Russia. Population: 19 (2010 census);

== Geography ==
This rural locality is located 4 kilometres (2.5 mi) from Rodniki (the district's administrative centre), 48 kilometres (30 mi) from Ivanovo (capital of Ivanovo Oblast) and 291 kilometres (181 mi) from Moscow. Tatarintsevo is the nearest rural locality.
