= Avdotyino, Sudogodsky District, Vladimir Oblast =

Avdotyino Авдотьино
- Village
- Location within Vladimir Oblast Location within Russia
- Coordinates: 55°54′N 40°38′E
- Country: Russia
- Region: Vladimir Oblast
- District: Sudogodsky District
- Time zone: UTC+3:00

Avdotyino (Russian: Авдотьино) is a rural locality (a village) in Golovinskoye Rural Settlement, Sudogodsky District, Vladimir Oblast, Russia. The population was 4 as of 2010.

== Geography ==
Avdotyino is located 27 km west of Sudogda (the district's administrative centre) by road. Tsvetkovo is the nearest rural locality.
