= Avdotyino, Volokolamsky District, Moscow Oblast =

Avdotyino Авдотьино
- Village
- Location within Moscow Oblast Location within Russia
- Coordinates: 56°03′N 36°01′E
- Country: Russia
- Region: Moscow Oblast
- District: Volokolamsky District
- Time zone: UTC+3:00

Avdotyino (Russian: Авдотьино) is a rural locality (a village) in Kashinskoye Rural Settlement of Volokolamsky District, Moscow Oblast, Russia. The population was 9 as of 2010.

== Geography ==
Avdotyino is located 8 km northeast of Volokolamsk (the district's administrative centre) by road. Golubtsovo is the nearest rural locality.
