= Yevgeni Safonov =

Yevgeni Safonov may refer to:

- Yevgeni Safonov (Uzbekistani footballer) (born 1977), Uzbekistan national team football player
- Yevgeni Safonov (skier), Kazakhstani cross country skier who competed at the 2006 Winter Olympics
