= Novosyolka, Kameshkovsky District, Vladimir Oblast =

Novosyolka Новосёлка
- Village
- Location within Vladimir Oblast Location within Russia
- Coordinates: 56°23′N 40°44′E
- Country: Russia
- Region: Vladimir Oblast
- District: Kameshkovsky District
- Time zone: UTC+3:00

Novosyolka (Russian: Новосёлка) is a rural locality (a village) in located in the Sergeikhinskoye Rural Settlement, Kameshkovsky District, Vladimir Oblast, Russia. The population was 13 as of 2010.

== Geography ==
Novosyolka is located on the Pechuga River, 21 km northwest of Kameshkovo (the district's administrative centre) by road. Novaya Zarya is the nearest rural locality.
