= Panteleyevo, Vologodsky District, Vologda Oblast =

Panteleyevo Пантелеево
- Village
- Location within Vologda Oblast Location within Russia
- Coordinates: 59°19′N 39°33′E
- Country: Russia
- Region: Vologda Oblast
- District: Vologodsky District
- Time zone: UTC+3:00

Panteleyevo (Russian: Пантелеево) is a rural locality (a village) in Mayskoye Rural Settlement, Vologodsky District, Vologda Oblast, Russia. Its population was 4 in 2002.

== Geography ==
Panteleyevo is located 89 km northwest of Vologda (the district's administrative centre) by road. Kuzminskoye is the nearest rural locality.
