= Kolchugino, Vladimir Oblast =

Town in Vladimir Oblast, Russia

Kolchugino Кольчугино
- Town
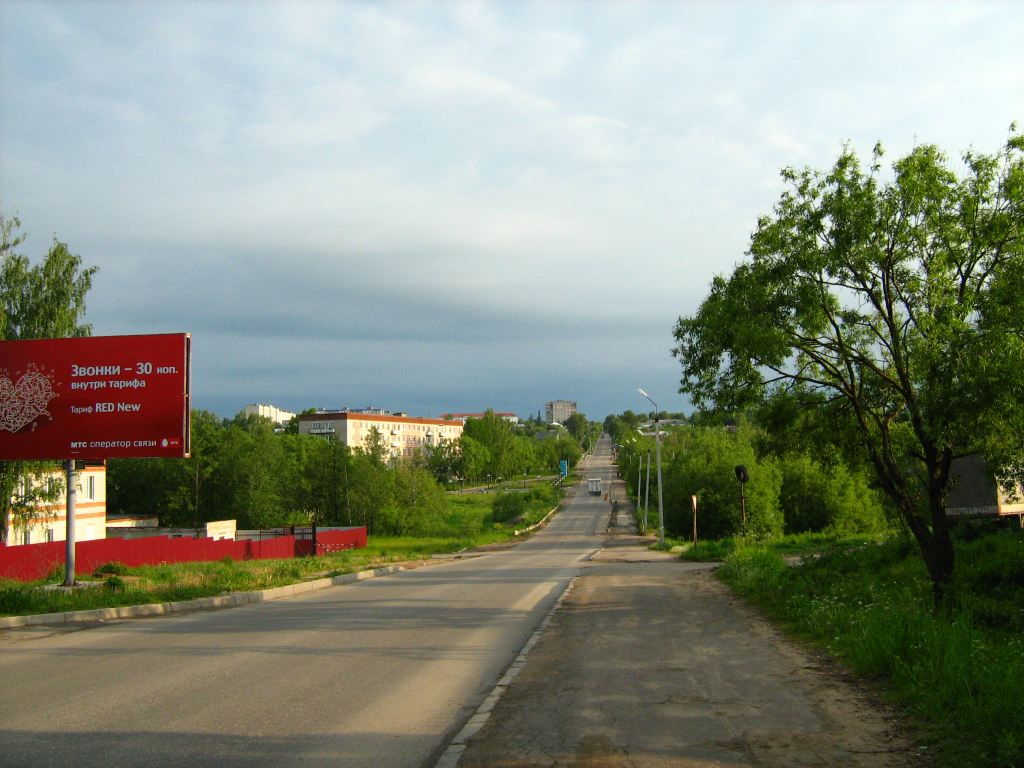
- View of Kolchugino

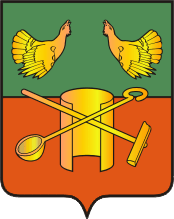
- Flag Coat of arms
- Interactive map of Kolchugino
- Location of Kolchugino Kolchugino (Vladimir Oblast)
- Coordinates: 56°19′N 39°22′E
- Country: Russia
- Federal subject: Vladimir Oblast
- Administrative district: Kolchuginsky District
- Founded: 1871
- Town status since: 1931
- Elevation: 175 m (574 ft)

Population (2010 Census)
  - Total: 45,776
  - Estimate (2025): 37,324 (−18.5%)

Administrative status
  - Capital of: Kolchuginsky District

Municipal status
  - Municipal district: Kolchuginsky Municipal District
  - Urban settlement: Kolchugino Urban Settlement
  - Capital of: Kolchuginsky Municipal District, Kolchugino Urban Settlement
- Time zone: UTC+3 (MSK)
- Postal code: 601780
- OKTMO ID: 17640101001
- Website: www.gorod.kolchadm.ru

Kolchugino (Russian: Кольчу́гино) is a town and the administrative center of Kolchuginsky District in Vladimir Oblast, Russia, located on the Peksha River (Klyazma's tributary) some 74 kilometers (46 mi) northwest of Vladimir, the administrative center of the oblast. Population: 39,410 (2021 census); 45,776 (2010 census); 47,059 (2002 census); 45,601 (1989 Soviet census).

== History ==
Kolchugino was founded in 1871 as a settlement next to copper-annealing and wire-producing plants belonging to a Muscovite merchant A. G. Kolchugin (hence, the name Kolchugino). It was granted town status in 1931.

== Administrative and municipal status ==
Within the framework of administrative divisions, Kolchugino serves as the administrative center of Kolchuginsky District, to which it is directly subordinated. As a municipal division, the town of Kolchugino, together with nine rural localities in Kolchuginsky District, is incorporated within Kolchuginsky Municipal District as Kolchugino Urban Settlement.

== Economy ==
Samovar and podstakannik made by Kolchugino plant

Podstakanniks made by Kolchugino plant

The town is well known for its tableware plant, founded by Alexander Kolchugin. Most of Russian tea glass-holders were produced in Kolchugino.

ZAO Kolchugtsvetmet, also located in Kolchugino and founded in 1871, is the largest manufacturer of non-ferrous mill products in the Commonwealth of Independent States.
