= Kolchuginsky District =

Kolchuginsky District Кольчугинский район (Russian)
- District
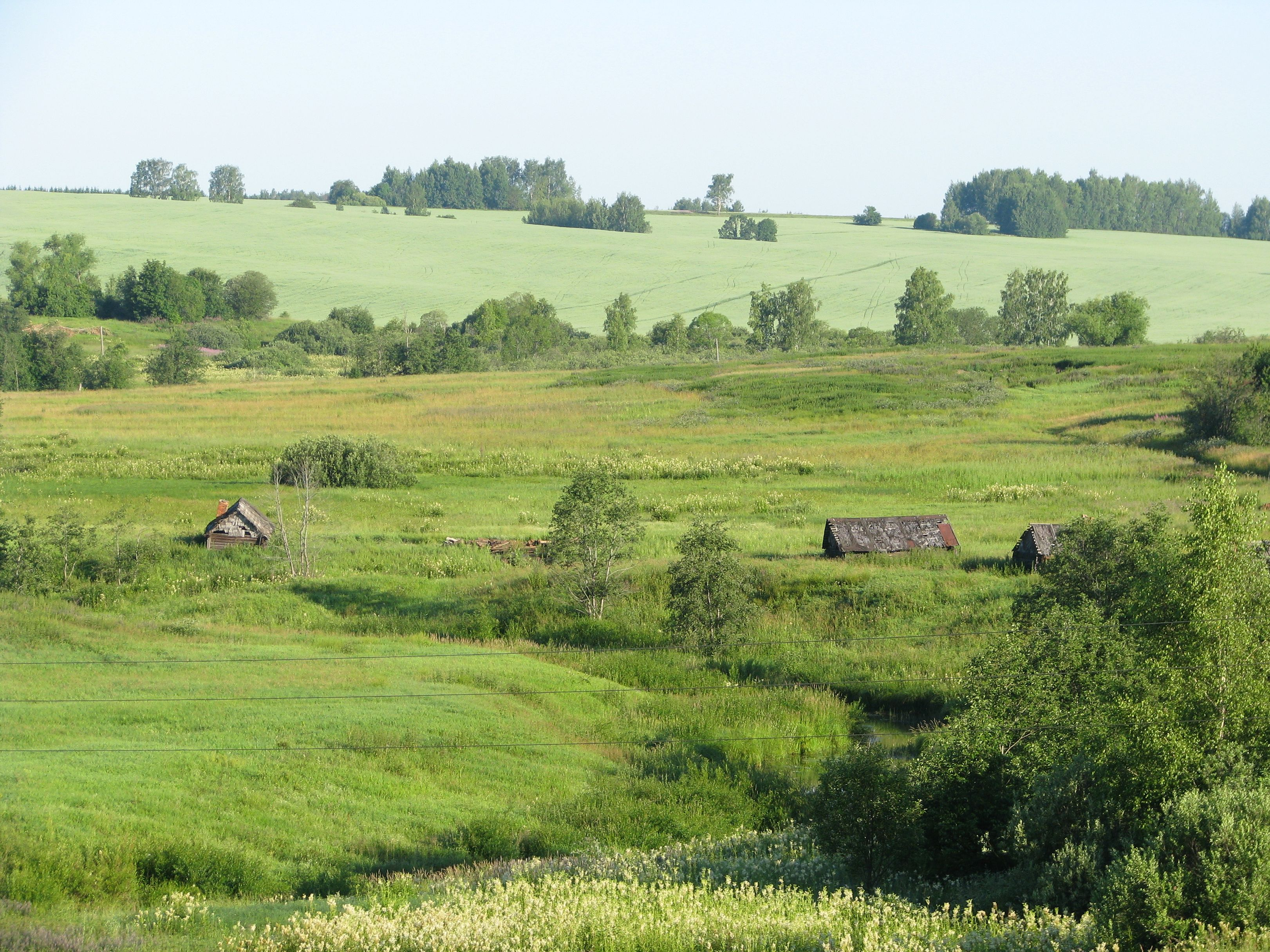
- Opolye, Kolchuginsky District

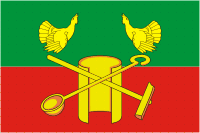
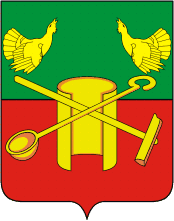
- Flag Coat of arms
- Location of Kolchuginsky District in Vladimir Oblast
- Coordinates: 56°18′N 39°23′E
- Country: Russia
- Federal subject: Vladimir Oblast
- Established: 10 April 1929
- Administrative center: Kolchugino

Area
  - Total: 1,148 km^{2} (443 sq mi)

Population (2010 Census)
  - Total: 56,351
  - Density: 49.09/km^{2} (127.1/sq mi)
  - Urban: 81.2%
  - Rural: 18.8%

Administrative structure
  - Inhabited localities: 1 cities/towns, 142 rural localities

Municipal structure
  - Municipally incorporated as: Kolchuginsky Municipal District
  - Municipal divisions: 1 urban settlements, 5 rural settlements
- Time zone: UTC+3 (MSK)
- OKTMO ID: 17640000
- Website: http://www.kolchadm.ru/

Kolchuginsky District (Russian: Кольчу́гинский райо́н) is an administrative and municipal district (raion), one of the sixteen in Vladimir Oblast, Russia. The area of the district is 1,148–1,170 square kilometers (443–452 sq mi). Its administrative center is the town of Kolchugino. Population: 49,656 (2021 census); 56,351 (2010 census); 11,405 (2002 Census); 16,312 (1989 Soviet census). The population of Kolchugino accounts for 79.4% of the district's total population.
