= Robert Klasson =

Russian and Soviet electrical engineer

- Роберт Эдуардович Классон
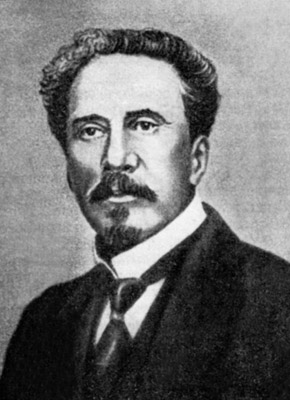
- Born: Robert Artur Eduardovich Klassohn; 31 January [O.S. 12 February] 1868; Kyiv, Russian Empire
- Died: 11 February 1926 (aged 57); Moscow, Russian SFSR, Soviet Union
- Resting place: Novodevichy Cemetery, Moscow
- Education: Saint Petersburg Technological Institute
- Known for: Russia's first three-phase power stations Electrification of Baku oil industry Bibi-Heybat Power Station; GOELRO plan Hydraulic peat extraction (hydroturf)
- Spouse(s): Sofya Ivanovna Motovilova (m. 1863; died 1912) Evgenia Nikolaevna Klasson
- Children: 5, including Yekaterina Klasson
- Scientific career
- Fields: Electrical engineering Energy engineering
- Workplaces: Okhta Powder Works; Elektricheskaya Sila (Baku); MGES-1
- Academic advisors: Vladimir Chikolev; Mikhail Dolivo-Dobrovolsky

Robert Artur Eduardovich Klasson (Russian: Роберт Эдуардович Классон; German: Robert Klassohn; 31 January [O.S. 12 February] 1868, Kyiv – 11 February 1926, Moscow) was a Russian and Soviet electrical engineer, energy specialist, and inventor. A student of Vladimir Chikolev and Mikhail Dolivo-Dobrovolsky, Klasson played a pioneering role in the electrification of Russia, including the construction of the country's first three-phase power stations and his participation in the development of the GOELRO plan for nationwide electrification.

== Early life and education ==
Klasson's grandfather Ernest Klassohn was a free, apparently Germanized Swede. His father Eduard Klassohn was born in 1829 in Jakobstadt in the Courland Governorate, became a pharmacist, and remained a foreigner in the Russian Empire throughout his life. His mother was Anna Karlovna.

Klasson entered the 1st Kyiv Gymnasium at the age of eight. In 1886, he began studies at the Technological Institute in Saint Petersburg, graduating in 1891. Following graduation, he undertook an internship in Germany. Under the direction of Mikhail Dolivo-Dobrovolsky, Klasson participated in the construction and commissioning of the Lauffen-Frankfurt three-phase power transmission line for the International Electrotechnical Exhibition in Frankfurt am Main, the world's first long-distance transmission of three-phase alternating current.

In Saint Petersburg, Klasson participated with Mikhail Brusnev, Leonid Krasin, Nadezhda Krupskaya, and others in the first Marxist circles. Reportedly, he was the one who introduced Krupskaya to Lenin. He was a participant in the 1893-1895 Saint Petersburg circle of Marxists that included Vladimir Lenin, Krupskaya, Alexander Potresov, Pyotr Struve, and others. He later withdrew from political activities.

== Career ==
From 1893 to 1897, Klasson worked at the Okhta Powder Works near Saint Petersburg. From 1895 to 1896, he directed the construction of Russia's first three-phase alternating current power station for the factory. From 1897 to 1898, he participated in the design and construction management of municipal power stations in Saint Petersburg and Moscow.

=== Electrification of Baku oil industry (1900-1906) ===
From 1900, Klasson worked together with Leonid Krasin on the electrification of the petroleum industry in Baku. He arrived in Baku on 8 March 1900, accompanied by engineer Alexander Lvovich Burinov. The two engineers spent their first week through 15 March familiarizing themselves with the situation and planning their projects. Klasson reported to Arnold Mikhailovich Feigl, the Baku director of the joint-stock company "Elektricheskaya Sila" (Electric Power), which had previously operated a small municipal power station in the city.

On 9 March 1900, Klasson concluded his first contract with local Azerbaijani contractors Haji Alijan and Mir Ismail for roadwork on the construction site. His primary responsibility was overseeing construction of a large power station in White City, an industrial district of Baku. The project included a main building housing machine and boiler halls, worker barracks and housing for technical personnel, workshops and warehouses, and an overhead transmission line extending approximately 8 versts (8.5 km) to the oil fields of Balakhany and Sabunchi. The station was designed to accommodate 16 steam boilers, comprising 13 Babcock-type and 3 Cornish-type boilers.

Construction faced numerous challenges, including unstable ground requiring foundation depths of up to 3 arshins (approximately 2.1 meters) and frequent powerful northern winds khazri that made work nearly impossible and covered everything in dust. Klasson also encountered conflicts with neighboring industrial facilities, particularly the oil storage facilities of Armenian magnate Alexander Mantashev, whose kerosene tanks periodically leaked flammable material onto Klasson's construction site.

Simultaneously with the Bely Gorod project, Klasson supervised construction of the Bibi-Heybat Power Station on the Bailov peninsula. This site, located adjacent to the Baku Military Port, required extensive land reclamation from the Caspian Sea. On 26 March 1900, Klasson visited the site and noted that reclaiming the sea was accomplished through constructing a cement breakwater along the boundary with stone and sand fill in the middle. The project involved complex negotiations with Admiral Vladimir Romanovich von Berg, commander of the Baku Port, regarding permission to lay electrical cables across naval territory.

Klasson's diary extensively documents his frustrations with German equipment suppliers. He contracted with major firms including AEG, Siemens & Halske, and the Polish firm Fitzner & Gamper for boilers. In his 17 July 1900 entry, Klasson contrasted the quality of work from different suppliers, praising AEG for drawings that were "developed brilliantly, all details are indicated; the drawings are completely clear and visual, as all the various pipes are colored with different colors." By contrast, he criticized Siemens & Halske for providing "two blueprints which require long study, as they are not colored, and pipes are projected one onto another... everywhere the pipes hit the crane pillars. Condensation pots are completely omitted. In general, the negligence is astounding." He worked closely with Paul Röhll, a Siemens & Halske engineer who served as the firm's representative in Baku and provided valuable guidance on navigating local business relationships.

Klasson was an active member of the Baku Branch of the Imperial Russian Technical Society (IRTO), participating in meetings and occasionally serving as secretary at sessions. His professional network included Zeynalabdin Taghiyev, a prominent oil industrialist whose textile factory served as an architectural model for Klasson's worker housing, and Alexander Mantashev, owner of major oil and manufacturing facilities.

Klasson's diary provides firsthand documentation of the August 1905 Armenian-Azerbaijani violence that devastated Baku and its oil fields. On 20-25 August 1905, large-scale violence erupted between Armenian and Azerbaijani communities. According to police reports cited in the diary, 79 people were killed (43 Armenians, 35 Muslims, 4 Russians, and 1 Pole), with hundreds wounded. The violence spread to the oil fields that Klasson had electrified, with fires engulfing the Balakhani, Sabunchi, and Bibi-Eybat oil field districts on 22 August 1905, destroying hundreds of derricks and storage facilities. On 30 August 1905, Klasson attended an emergency session of the Baku IRTO branch to address the crisis. The meeting debated whether to halt all industrial work on the oil fields due to safety concerns. During heated discussions, Klasson protested against what he considered "general phrases" and demanded "concrete proposals." The meeting ultimately voted to demand guarantees for worker and engineer safety before resuming oil field operations. In 1906, when he refused to use repressive measures against striking workers, Klasson was forced to resign from his position as director of the newly founded Baku joint-stock company "Elektrosila."

=== Later career in Moscow ===
In 1906, Klasson became director of the Moscow thermal power station MGES-1, a position he held until 1926. From 1912 to 1914, he participated in organizing the construction of Russia's first peat-fired power station "Elektroperedacha" (later GRES-3) in Bogorodsk uezd of Moscow Oblast (now Elektrogorsk). In 1914, he participated in the construction of a 70 kV high-voltage transmission line from the settlement of Elektroperedacha through Bogorodsk to Moscow (Izmailovo).

In 1914, Klasson proposed and, together with engineer V. D. Kirpichnikov, developed a hydraulic method for peat extraction (hydroturf), which significantly reduced the labor intensity of peat development. This method was intended for use at the Shatura Power Station, established in 1916 by the Electric Lighting Society, but due to the February Revolution of 1917 and subsequent events, it was only practically implemented in the early 1920s.

From 1918 to 1920, Klasson participated in the development of the GOELRO plan for the electrification of the country. From 1922 to 1926, he served as a member of the board of MOGES. His work in the final years of his life was devoted to solving problems of drying and dewatering hydroturf.

=== Death and legacy ===
Klasson died on 11 February 1926 at a meeting of the Supreme Soviet of the National Economy after delivering a passionate speech on energy development. He was buried at Novodevichy Cemetery in Moscow, in section No. 1, second row. His second wife Evgenia Nikolaevna Klasson (1875-1952) and son Ivan Robertovich Klasson (1899-1991) are buried alongside him.

A monument to Robert Klasson has stood on the station square in Elektrogorsk since 2014. The GRES-3 power station and streets in Mirny and Ozyorny, as well as the settlement of Klasson, bear his name. An obituary in the Journal of the Association of German Engineers honored him as "the most important electrical engineer in Russia."

== Family ==
Klasson was married to Sofya Ivanovna Klasson (née Motozilova, 1863-1912). Their children included:

- Sofya Robertovna Klasson (1892-1930), daughter
- Tatyana Robertovna Svechanskaya (née Klasson, 1896-1943), daughter
- Ivan Robertovich Klasson (1899-1991), son, electrical engineer
- Yekaterina Robertovna Klasson (1901-1980), daughter, artist, art historian, and translator who married the poet Valentin Parnakh
- Pavel Robertovich Klasson (1904-1944), son

Klasson's sister Ella Eduardovna was married to court councillor Pyotr Pavlovich Alexandrov, justice of the peace in Tarashcha, Kyiv Governorate. Their son Anatoly Alexandrov (1903-1994) became one of the Soviet Union's leading nuclear physicists, three-time Hero of Socialist Labor (1954, 1960, 1973), and President of the Academy of Sciences of the USSR (1975-1986).

== Works ==
- Klasson, R. E., Chikolev, V. N., & Tyurin, V. A. (1891). Осветительная способность прожекторов электрического света [The illuminating capacity of electric light projectors]. Part 1. Saint Petersburg.
- Klasson, R. E., Chikolev, V. N., & Tyurin, V. A. (1895). Осветительная способность прожекторов электрического света [The illuminating capacity of electric light projectors]. Part 2. Saint Petersburg.
- Klasson, R. E. (1897). Электрическая передача силы трехфазными токами на Охтенских пороховых заводах близ Санкт-Петербурга [Electric power transmission by three-phase currents at the Okhta Powder Works near Saint Petersburg]. Saint Petersburg.
- Klasson, R. E., Kirpichnikov, V. D., Stadnikov, G. L., et al. (1923). Гидроторф [Hydroturf]. Book 1. Moscow.
- Klasson, R. E., Kirpichnikov, V. D., Stadnikov, G. L., et al. (1927). Гидроторф [Hydroturf]. Book 2, Parts 1-4. Moscow.
