= Electricity sector in Imperial Russia =

The electricity sector in Imperial Russia developed in the late nineteenth century. Vladimir Chikolev founded the electrical engineering section of the Imperial Russian Technical Society in 1878.

== See also ==
- Industrialization in the Russian Empire
- Energy policy of the Soviet Union
