= Movsum bey Khanlarov =

Azerbaijani chemist (1857–1921)

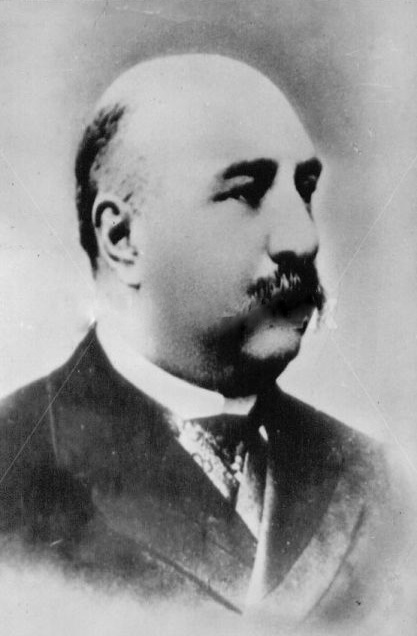
- Movsum bey in the early 20th cc.
- Born: September 24, 1857; Baku, Russian Empire
- Died: February 23, 1921 (aged 63); Baku, Azerbaijan SSR
- Education: University of Strasbourg
- Scientific career
- Fields: Chemistry
- Workplaces: Russian Technical Society
- Doctoral advisor: Wilhelm Rudolph Fittig

Movsum bey Khanlarov (Azerbaijani: Mövsüm bəy Xanlarov; 24 September 1857 in Baku – 23 February 1921 in Baku) was the first Azerbaijani chemist with a special education, specializing in organic chemistry.

== Life ==
Movsum bey Khanlarov was born on September 24, 1857, in Baku, and belonged to the Khanlarovs' bek family. In 1878 he graduated from the Baku real school. After graduating from college, he went to continue his studies in Germany. He entered the Faculty of Mathematics and Natural History of the University of Strasbourg. At the university, Khanlarov worked in the laboratory of the German scientist Wilhelm Rudolph Fittig.

In 1882, in the journal "Chemische Berichte", which was an organ of the German Chemical Society, Khanlarov published his first article entitled "On the action of thioacetic acid on ethyl thiocyanate".

In 1883, at the Academic Council of the University of Strasbourg, Khanlarov defended his thesis entitled "On Butyrolactones and Ethylbutyrolactones" and received a doctorate in chemistry. This second article by Khanlarov was published in 1884 in the Liebig Annals. In the same year, on the recommendation of D. I. Mendeleev, N. A. Menshutkin and D. P. Konovalov, Khanlarov was accepted as a member of the Russian Physical and Chemical Society. Returning to Baku, Khanlarov also became a member of the Baku branch of the Russian Technical Society, where he was a member of the inspection commission. Movsum-bek Khanlarov was the only Azerbaijani chemist with a special education before the establishment of Soviet power in Azerbaijan.

According to Yusif Mammadaliyev, after returning to his homeland, Khanlarov “due to the lack of appropriate conditions and the necessary support, he stopped his chemical research in 1887.” Mammadaliyev reports that since that time Khanlarov's name is no longer mentioned in the lists of members of the Russian Physico-Chemical Society. Movsum-bek Khanlarov died on February 23, 1921, in Baku.

== See also ==
- Yusif Mammadaliyev

== Sources ==
- Guliev, Jamil (1986). Azərbaycan Sovet Ensiklopediyası. Baku: ASE Redaksiyası.
- Zülfüqarov, J (1970). Химия в АГУ за пятьдесят лет. Baku: BSU Press.
- Платонов, Б; Мамедалиев, А (1966). Страницы жизни. Baku: здательство Академии наук Азербайджанской ССР.
