= Lake Svyatoye =

- Russian: Озеро Святое (English: "Holy Lake")
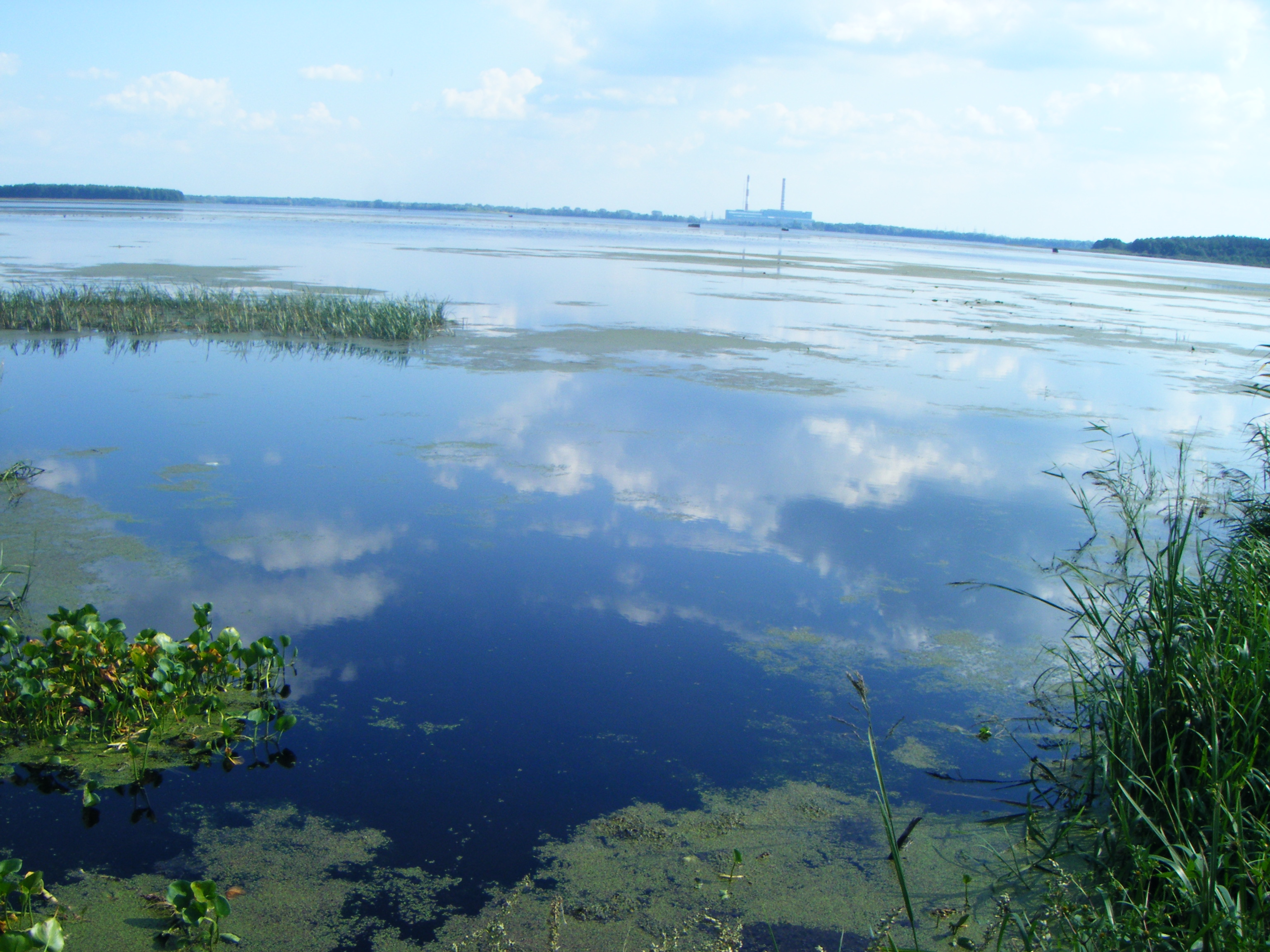
- Shatura Power Station against the lake

- Location within Moscow Oblast Location within Russia
- Location: Shatursky District, Moscow Oblast, Russia
- Coordinates: 55°37′N 39°33′E
- Lake type: Glacial lake
- Primary outflows: Bolshaya Ushma River
- Catchment area: 72.4 km^{2} (0 sq mi)
- Max. length: 5 km (3.1 mi)
- Max. width: 3 km (1.9 mi)
- Surface area: 11.8 km^{2} (4.6 sq mi)
- Average depth: 1.1 m (3.6 ft; 0.60 fathoms)
- Max. depth: 8 m (26 ft; 4.4 fathoms)
- Surface elevation: 120.7 m (396 ft)
- Settlements: Shatura

Lake Svyatoye (Russian: Свя́тое о́зеро, IPA: [ˈsvʲɪtəjə ˈozʲɪrə] — literally Holy lake) is a glacial lake in Shatursky District, Moscow Oblast, Russia, about 120 km east of Moscow. It is one of the three largest lakes of Moscow Oblast with an area of 11.8 km^{2}. The town of Shatura is located on its southern coast. Bolshaya Ushma River starts from here. There are two other lakes in Shatursky District on the border with Vladimir and Ryazan regions: Lake Svyatoye (Moscow and Vladimir Oblasts) and Lake Svyatoye (Moscow and Ryazan Oblasts).

== Name ==
According to local legend, the lake got its name because of a church that stood in the middle of the lake on an island. However, there is no documentary evidence of the existence of this church or the island. However, in this case the locals showed the shards seen on the shoal in the middle of the lake as evidence.

== Geography and hydrography ==
Lake of glacial origin. The lake is characterized by sloping, low shores. The northern and partly western shores are wooded and heavily swamped. The lake is located among peat bogs, has a muddy bottom and slightly brownish water. A total of about 30 watercourses flow into Svyatoye Lake. The lake is connected by channels with the neighboring lakes: Beloe (Russian for "white lake"), Muromskoye (Russian for "muroma lake") and Chyornoe (Russian for "black lake"); together the system of lakes is a water-cooler of Shaturskaya GRES. A dam (with two concrete bridges) and two spits were constructed on the lake to increase the circulation circle and better cooling of the waste water discharged by the power plant into the communicating lake Muromskoye. In addition, the lake is communicated by two ditches with the now very swampy lake Chyornoe-Spasskoe.
