= Shatura =

Town in Moscow Oblast, Russia

Shatura Шатура
- Town
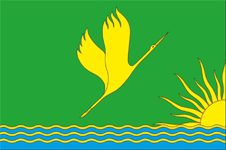
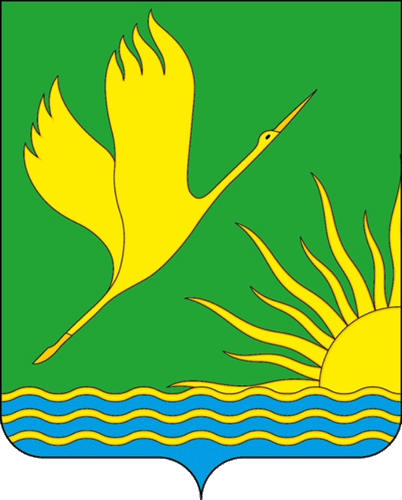
- Flag Coat of arms
- Interactive map of Shatura
- Location of Shatura Shatura (Moscow Oblast)
- Coordinates: 55°34′N 39°33′E
- Country: Russia
- Federal subject: Moscow Oblast
- Administrative district: Shatursky District
- TownSelsoviet: Shatura
- Founded: 1928
- Town status since: 1936
- Elevation: 125 m (410 ft)

Population (2010 Census)
  - Total: 32,885
  - Estimate (2024): 36,714 (+11.6%)

Administrative status
  - Capital of: Shatursky District, Town of Shatura

Municipal status
  - Municipal district: Shatursky Municipal District
  - Urban settlement: Shatura Urban Settlement
  - Capital of: Shatursky Municipal District, Shatura Urban Settlement
- Time zone: UTC+3 (MSK)
- Postal codes: 140700, 140702–140703, 140708
- OKTMO ID: 46586000001
- Website: www.shaturagrad.ru

Shatura (Russian: Шату́ра) is a town and the administrative center of Shatursky District in Moscow Oblast, Russia, located on Lake Svyatoye 124 kilometers (77 mi) east of Moscow. Population: 32,885 (2010 census); 30,393 (2002 census); 31,635 (1989 Soviet census).

== History ==
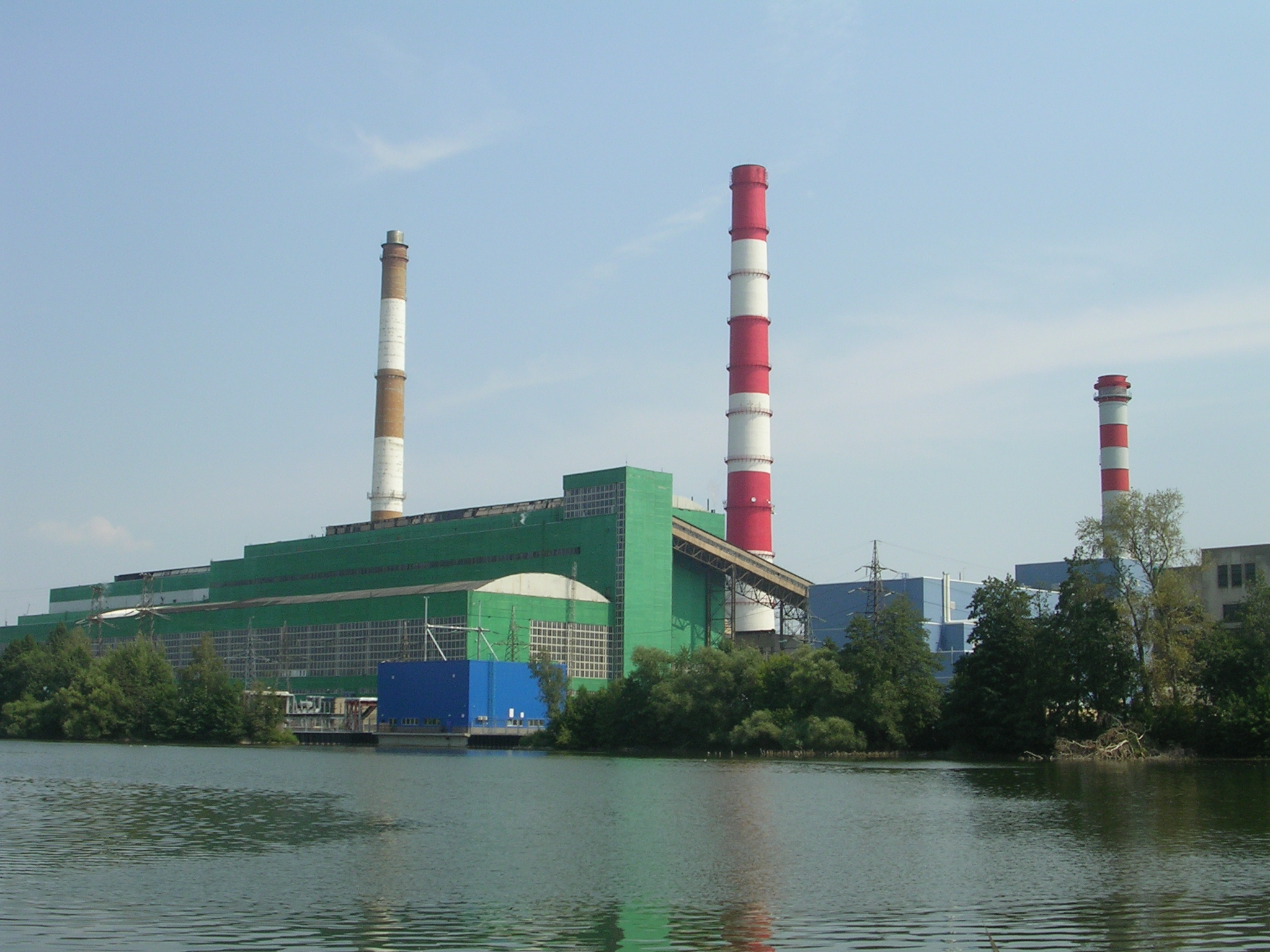
Shatura Power Station

A settlement on the site of modern Shatura has existed since 1423. In 1917, peat deposits mining started in the vicinity. In 1918, construction of the first peat-fueled electric Shatura Power Station began near the village of Torbeyevka (Торбе́евка). In 1919, the settlement of Shaturstroy (Шатурстро́й) was founded nearby and in 1920, the settlement of Chyornoye Ozero (Чёрное О́зеро) followed. In 1928, the three settlements were merged to form the settlement of Shatura, which was granted town status in 1936.

== Administrative and municipal status ==
Within the framework of administrative divisions, Shatura serves as the administrative center of Shatursky District. As an administrative division, it is, together with twenty-three rural localities, incorporated within Shatursky District as the Town of Shatura. As a municipal division, the Town of Shatura is incorporated within Shatursky Municipal District as Shatura Urban Settlement.

== Sports ==
Shatura is home to bandy club Energiya and Celtic inspired football club Celtic Shatura.
