= Yusif Məmmədəliyev (village) =

Coordinates: 40°47′N 48°36′E

Yusif Məmmədəliyev is a village in the municipality of Avaxıl in the Shamakhi Rayon of Azerbaijan. The village is named in honor of Dr. Yusif Mammadaliyev.

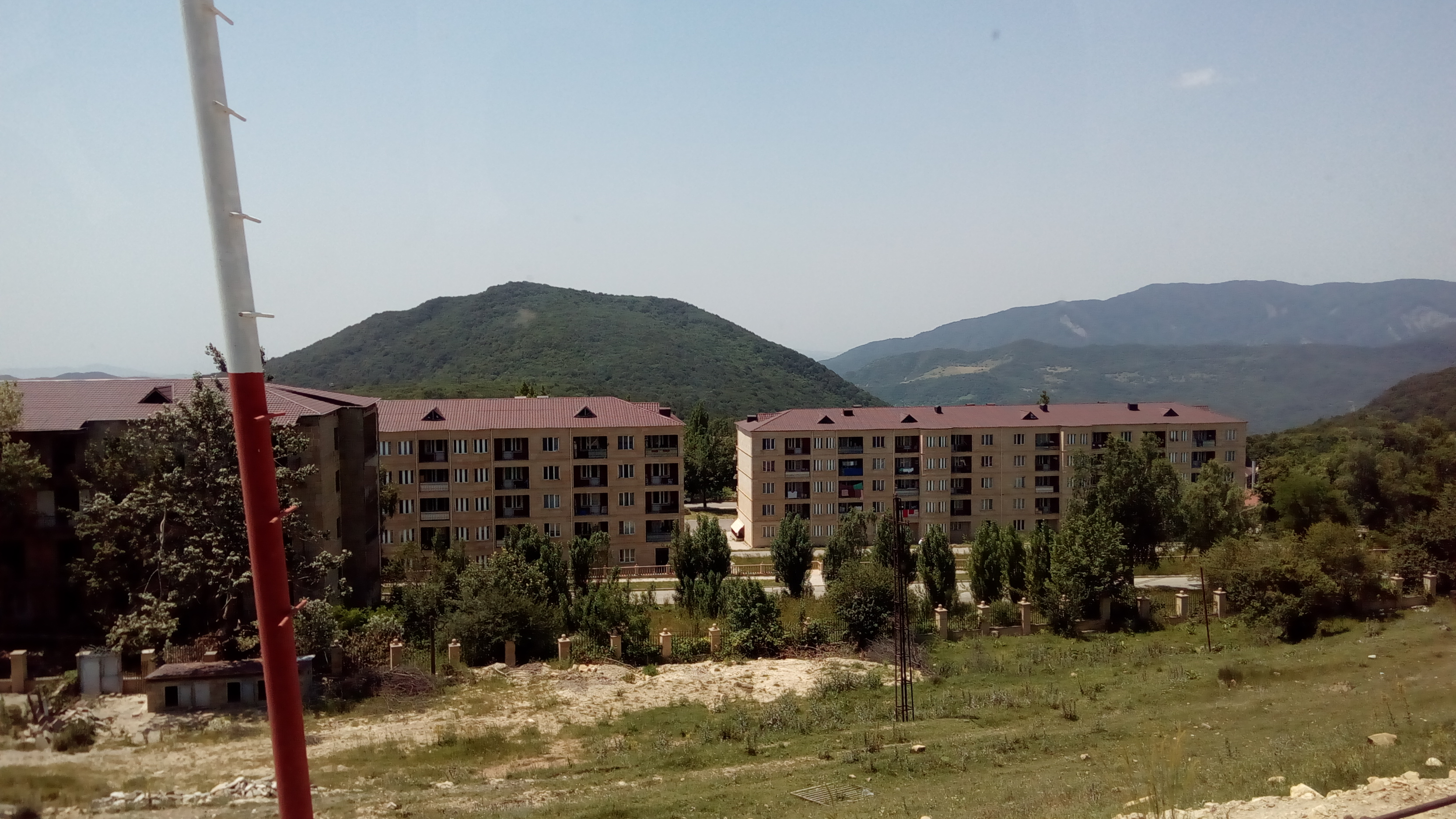
View of the village
