= Thermal power stations in Russia and the Soviet Union =

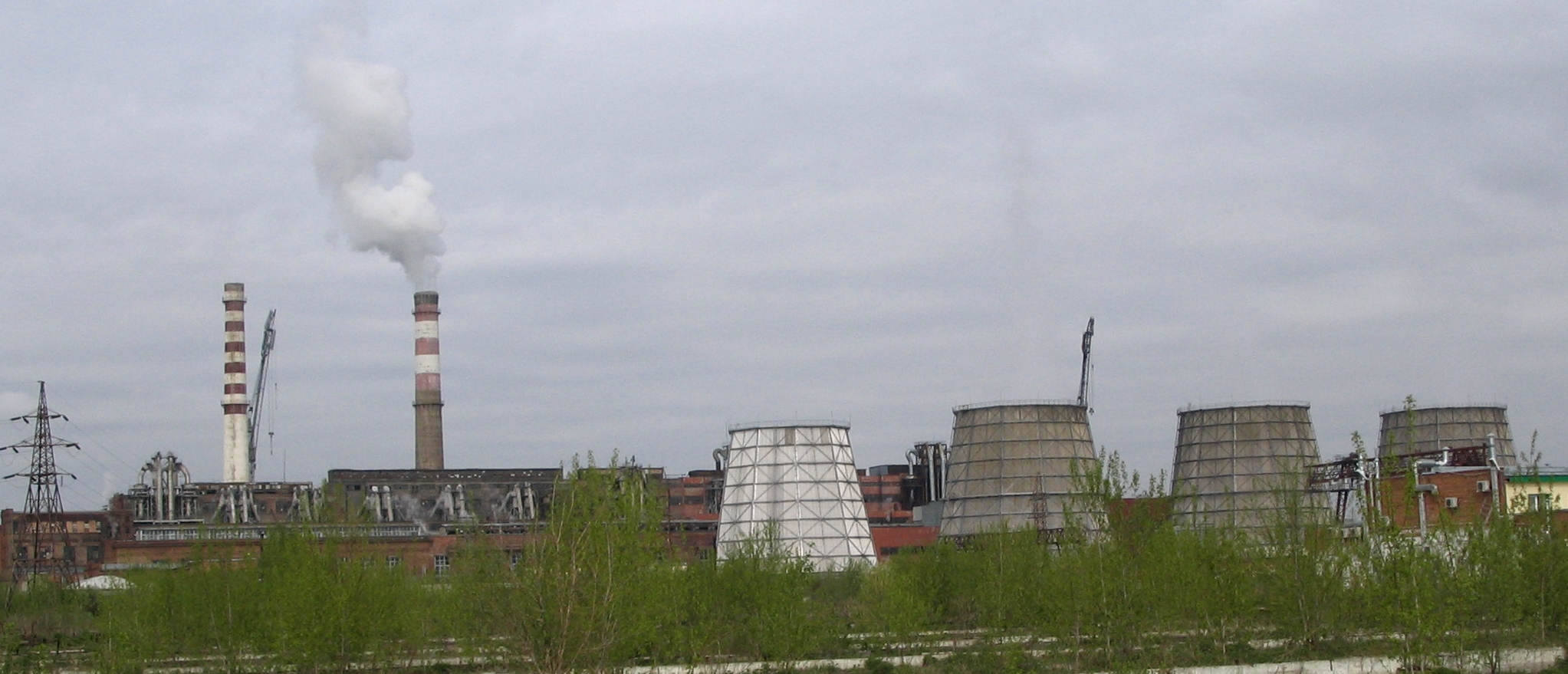
Tomsk GRES-2, Tomsk

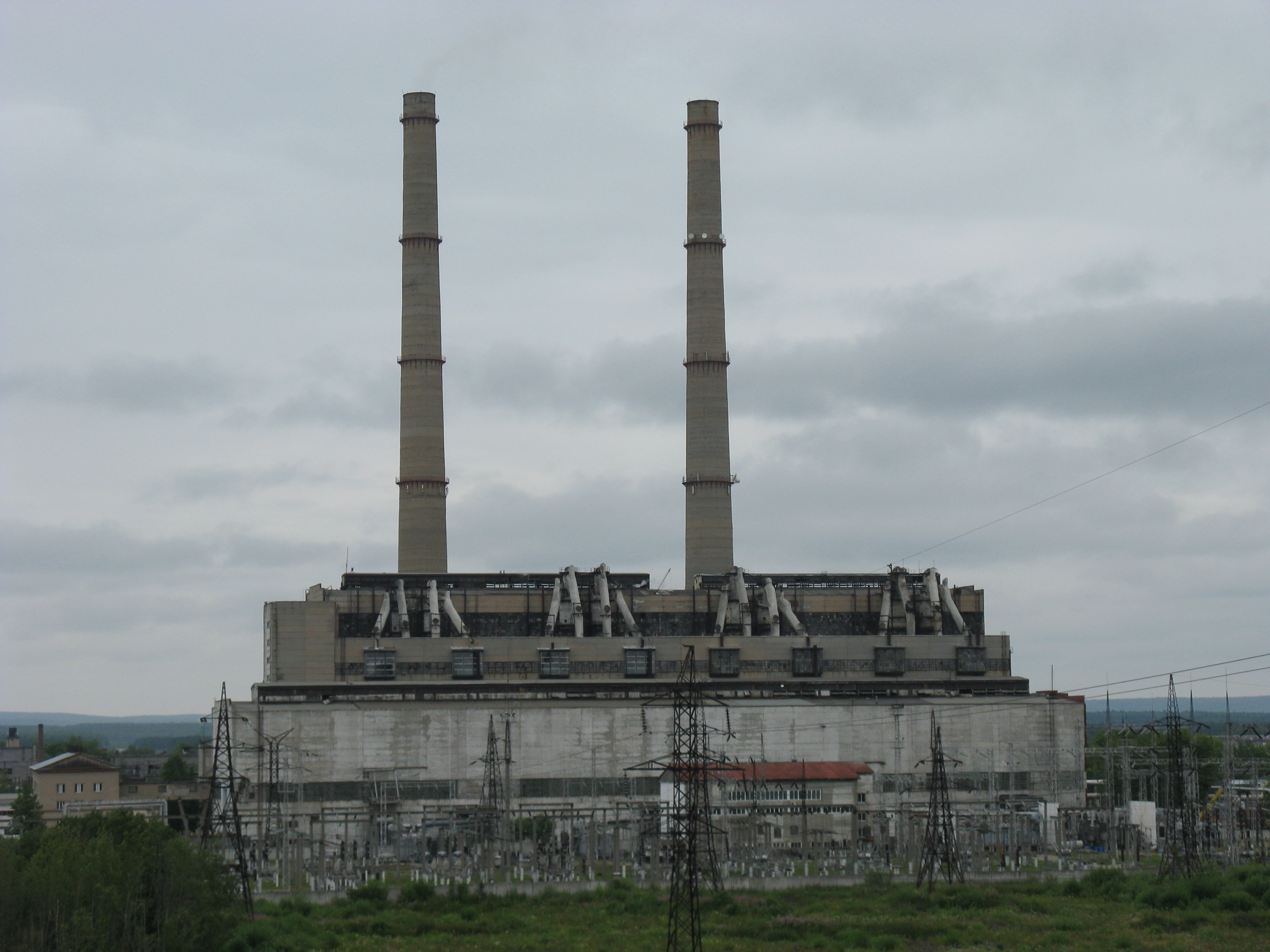
Yayva GRES-16, Yayva

The first large peat-fired thermal power station in Russia was built on a location about 80 km away from Moscow, in the place of the current city of Elektrogorsk, during 1912-1914. It was called Elektroperedacha (literally "electric power transmission"), and the settlement around the station (future Elektrogorsk) acquired this name, Elektroperedacha, as well. Today the station is called GRES-3 or Elektrogorskaya GRES.

== Terminology ==
The abbreviations below are commonly used in the names of power stations.

The term GRES (Russian: ГРЭС (Государственная Районная Электростанция), lit. 'State Regional Power Station', Ukrainian: ДРЕС, romanized: DRES) refers to a condenser type electricity-only thermal power station introduced in the Soviet Union which still exist in Russia and other former Soviet republics. The Russian abbreviation ГРЭС stands for Государственная районная электростанция, or "state-owned district power plant" (often abbreviated in English as SDPP). Over time the abbreviation has lost its literal meaning, and the term refers to a high-power (thousands of megawatt) thermal power station of condenser type.

The terms TEC and TET (Russian: ТЭЦ, теплоэлектроцентраль) refer to combined heat and power plants.

== History ==
The Soviet GOELRO plan of 1920s provided for construction of several GRES (along with 20 TEC and 10 hydroelectrostations, the best known among them is Shatura Power Station (peat-fired, planned already in 1914).

The first GRES were constructed upon the initiative of power engineer Robert Klasson.
