= Avaxıl =

- Municipality
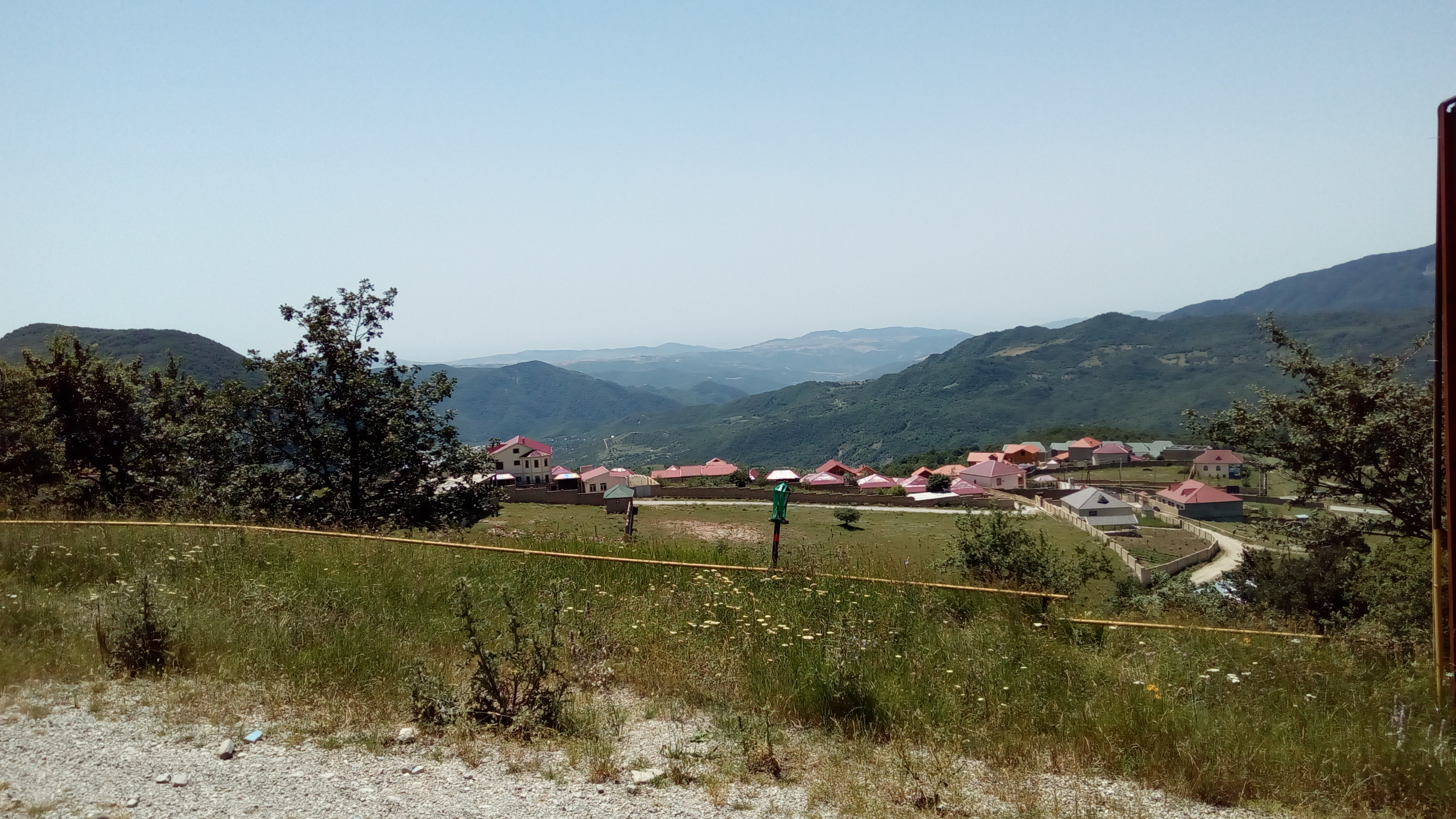

- Location within Azerbaijan
- Coordinates: 40°48′00″N 48°33′52″E
- Country: Azerbaijan
- Rayon: Shamakhi

Population
  - Total: 534
- Time zone: UTC+4 (AZT)
  - Summer (DST): UTC+5 (AZT)

Avaxıl (also, Avakhyl) is a village and municipality in the Shamakhi Rayon of Azerbaijan. It has a population of 534. The municipality consists of the villages of Avaxıl and Yusif Məmmədəliyev.

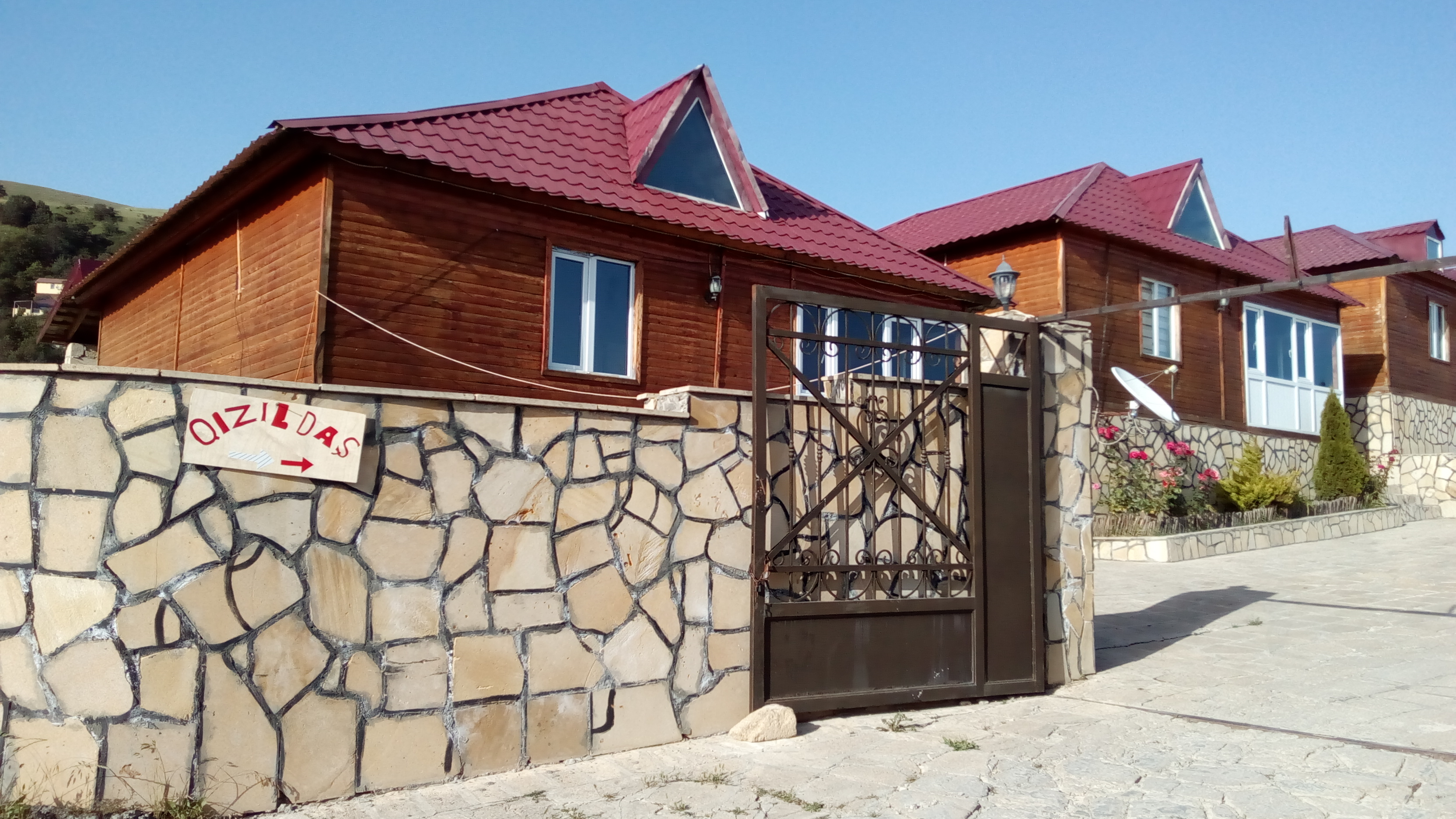
Avaxıl, Qızıldaş

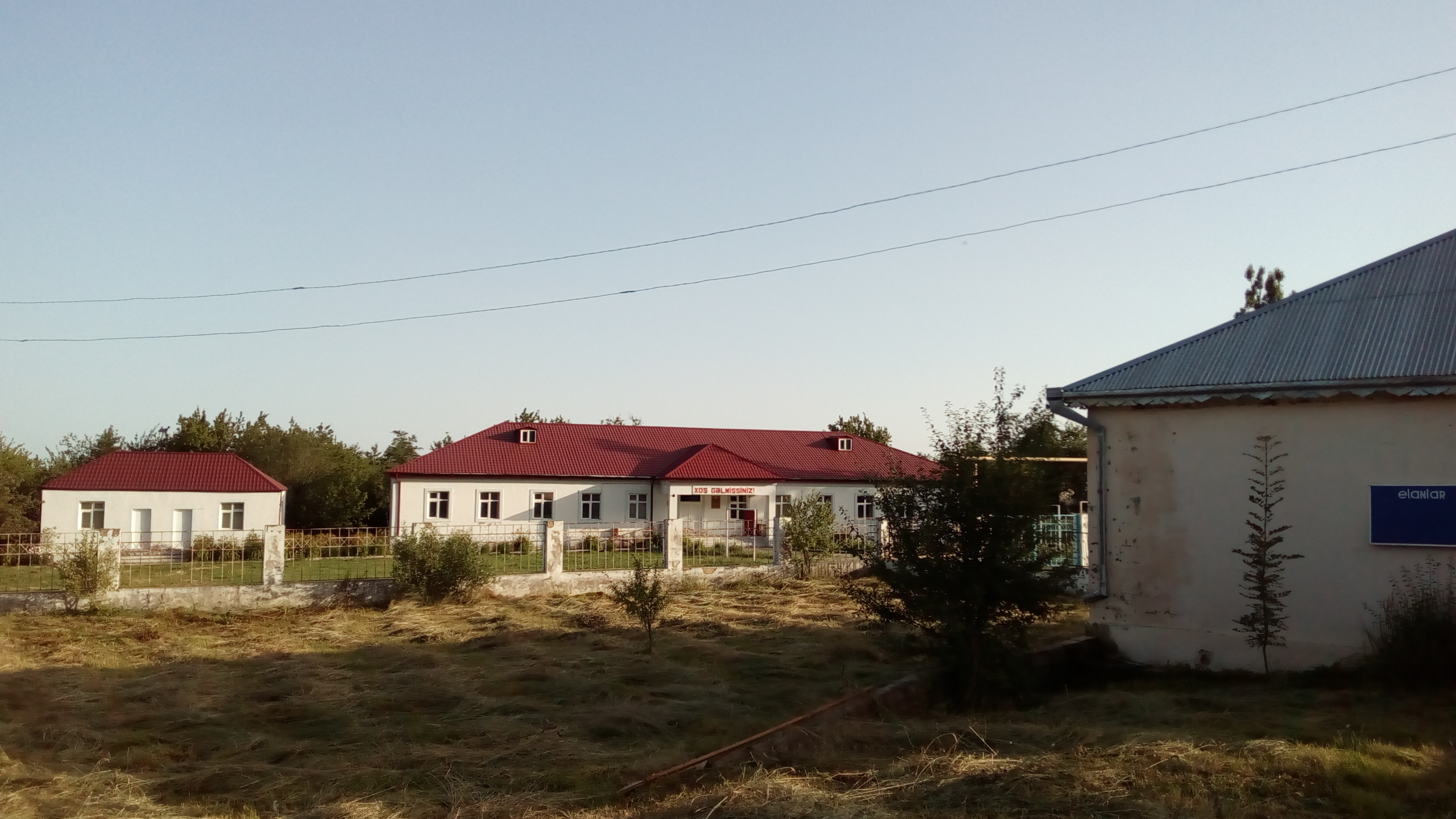
School in Avakhil
