= Paul Röhll =

German diplomat and engineer (1863–1909)

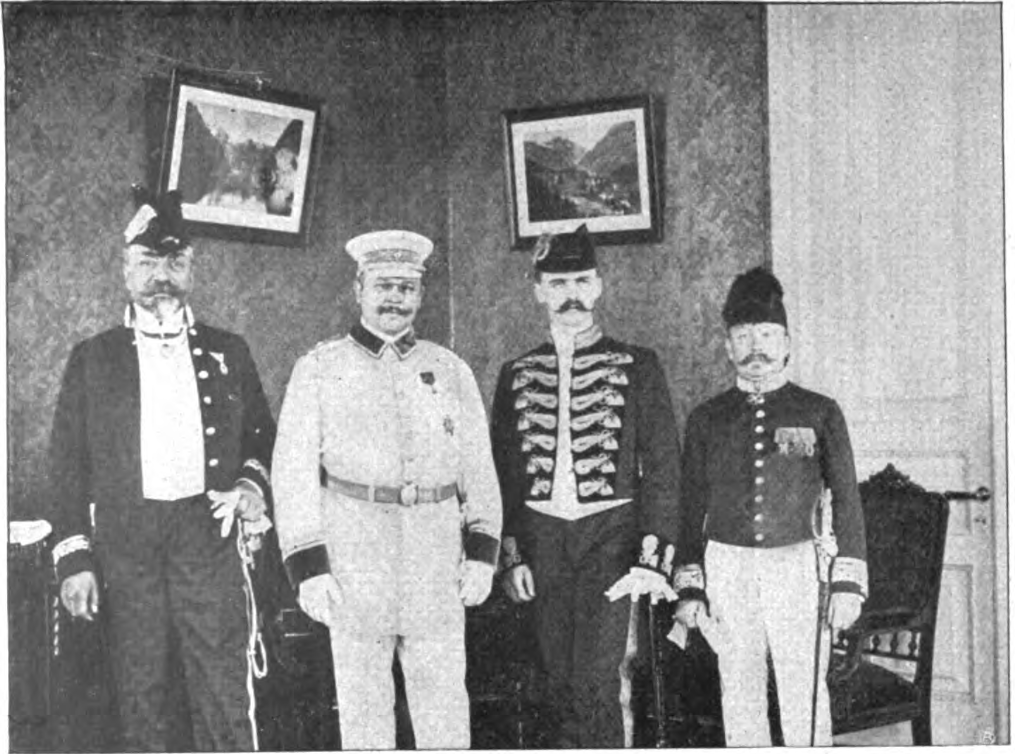
- Paul Röhll (second from left) with consuls of other European nations in Baku, 1905. From left to right: Ugent Mutafow (Italy), Röhll (Germany), Erik Biering (Denmark), U.M. Feigl (Netherlands).

German consul in Baku
- In office February 23, 1904 – April 11, 1909
- Preceded by: Henry Steppuhn
- Succeeded by: Otto Tiedemann

Personal details
- Born: 14 March 1863 Berlin, Kingdom of Prussia
- Died: 11 April 1909 (aged 46) Baku, Russian Empire (now Azerbaijan)
- Resting place: Trinity Churchyard I, Berlin-Kreuzberg
- Spouse: Sophie Röhll
- Education: Royal Wilhelm Gymnasium
- Occupation: Diplomat, Merchant, Manager
- Awards: Order of the Golden Star (Bukhara); Order of the Lion and the Sun (Persia); Order of the Crown (Prussia); Order of St. Anna (Russia); Order of the Red Eagle (Prussia)

Paul Heinrich Bernhard Röhll (Russian: Павел Германович Релль, romanized: Pavel Germanovich Rell; 14 March 1863 – 11 April 1909) was a German merchant, engineer, and diplomat who served as the Imperial German Consul in Baku from 1904 until his death in 1909. As a director for Siemens & Halske, he played a central role in German economic expansion in the Caucasus and Central Asia. He is also noted for his diplomatic reporting during the ethnic unrest of 1905 and his intelligence work regarding Russian Turkestan.

== Early life and business career ==
Paul Röhll was born on 14 March 1863 in Berlin, the son of the merchant Hermann Röhll and Klara Pastor. He held citizenship as a subject of the Kingdom of Prussia. After completing his education at the Royal Wilhelm Gymnasium in Berlin and performing military service with the Kurmark Dragoon Regiment 14, he managed his family's button factory. He later moved to Saint Petersburg, managing a similar enterprise. In September 1890, while registered as a temporary St. Petersburg merchant, Röhll was granted a five-year privilege for an 'improved device for buttons'." He worked in this capacity until 1892, and joined Siemens & Halske in 1896 after a tenure at the electrical firm of Robert Kolbe. While in St. Petersburg, he was active in the technical community, delivering a lecture in 1898 to the St. Petersburg Polytechnic Association (German: St. Petersburger Polytechnischer Verein) on Siemens & Halske's manufacturing in Russia.

In 1899, Röhll established the Caucasian-Central Asian department for Siemens & Halske in Baku, operating from Merkuryevskaya Street (currently, Zərifə Əliyeva str). Following the merger of the firm's Russian plants into the joint-stock company Elektrosila-Baku, Röhll became a key intermediary for German subcontractors accessing markets beyond the Caspian. He worked closely with engineer Robert Klasson on electrifying the oil fields and negotiated with regional powers like the Nobel Brothers.

Röhll was also a prominent figure in high society, maintaining membership in the exclusive Baku Yacht Club. Röhll and his wife, Sophie, were active in Baku's philanthropic scene. In December 1904, they helped organize a charity ball at the Baku Public Assembly to fund free public libraries. Röhll utilized his engineering expertise to manage the event's "lighting effects," while his wife served as a hostess.

== Diplomatic work ==
Following the death of consul Henry Steppuhn, Röhll assumed consular duties on 23 February 1904. During the Revolution of 1905 and the ensuing ethnic conflict, he reported extensively on the destruction of oil infrastructure and demanded protection for German nationals, for which he was awarded the Order of the Crown, 4th Class, in 1906. He also forwarded scientific data on seismic activity from geologist Dmitry Golubyatnikov to researchers in Germany and personally documented the 1904 eruption of the Otman-Basy-Dag mud volcano.

A major focus of Röhll's work was the strategic economic reconnaissance of Russian Turkestan. Following Russia's abolition of free transit trade through the Caucasus in 1883, the German export trade to Qajar Iran had suffered significant losses, prompting a search for alternative markets and routes in Central Asia. Ambassador Wilhelm von Schoen strongly supported Röhll's initiative, deeming it "highly desirable" to organize and control German interests, particularly in the Fergana Valley, where German capital investment was being solicited by local Russian circles.

To circumvent the Russian ban on foreign consuls in the region, Röhll coordinated with the German envoy in Tehran, Count Rex, to obtain a travel permit from the governor-general of Turkestan Nikolay Grodekov in his private capacity as a Siemens director rather than as a diplomat. His mission objectives were broad: he planned to collect samples of "all Central Asian products," arguing that physical samples would provide better intelligence to German merchants than "words and figures." Additionally, the Foreign Office tasked him with investigating whether the flora and fauna of Central Asia were suitable for acclimatization in the colony of German East Africa.

Röhll's initiative sparked a rivalry with Wilhelm Kohlhaas, the German professional consul in Moscow. Kohlhaas viewed Central Asia as the exclusive commercial domain of Moscow-based firms and questioned Röhll's competence, arguing that "Baku has almost nothing to do with Central Asia." While Kohlhaas predicted a crash in the Turkestan cotton industry, Röhll remained optimistic about its growth. Röhll also had to navigate complex relations with Ludwig Bauer, the director of the Russo-Chinese Bank in Samarkand; while Bauer offered "not disinterested" assistance to German investors, Ambassador von Schoen noted confidentially that relations between Röhll and Bauer were poor.

Despite the internal friction, Röhll provided Berlin with concrete logistical and technical proposals to penetrate the market. Röhll identified a critical inefficiency in the booming Turkestan cotton trade. He reported that the American and English hydraulic presses in use were too large and expensive for many producers. He recommended that German manufacturers export smaller, cheaper presses; these would not only undercut foreign competitors but also compress cotton bales more effectively, optimizing the chronically scarce transport capacity on the Russian railways. To revitalize the stagnant trade route across the Caspian Sea, Röhll proposed the construction of more economical ship types that would allow Russian shipowners to resume profitable operations. His efforts led to the establishment of an agency for German steamship lines at the "Eastern Society" (Russian: Восточное общество) in Baku to facilitate onward transport to Central Asia and Persia.

Röhll was unable to execute his major expedition. A stroke in September 1907 forced him to postpone the trip, and he died on 11 April 1909 before it could be rescheduled. Following his death, his body was repatriated to Germany by sea via Batumi. He was subsequently buried at the Trinity Cemetery in Berlin-Kreuzberg. He was succeeded by Otto Tiedemann as next German consul in Baku.

== Honours ==
Röhll received several decorations for his commercial and diplomatic services:

- Order of the Golden Star, 3rd Class (Emirate of Bukhara)
- (Qajar Iran) Order of the Lion and the Sun, 4th Class (Persia)
- (Kingdom of Prussia) Order of the Crown, 4th Class (1906)
- (Russian Empire) Order of Saint Anna, 3rd Class (1907)
- (Kingdom of Prussia) Order of the Red Eagle, 4th Class (1908)

== Sources ==
- Der Mechaniker (1908-06-20). "Notice regarding Consul Röhll". Der Mechaniker (Zeitschrift zur Förderung der Präzisions-Mechanik u. Optik) (in German) (12): 142.
- Dornfeldt, Matthias; Seewald, Enrico (Spring 2015). "Geschichte der Deutsch-Aserbaidschanischen Beziehungen, Teil I: Deutsche Konsularische Vertretungen in Aserbaidschan vor dem Ersten Weltkrieg" [History of German-Azerbaijani Relations, Part I: German Consular Representations in Azerbaijan before the First World War] (PDF). IRS Geschichte (in German) (1 (10)): 42–49.
- Golubjatnikow, D. (1905). "Ausbruch des Schlammvulkans Otman-Basy-Dag bei Baku am 23. November 1904" [Eruption of the Mud Volcano Otman-Basy-Dag near Baku on 23 November 1904]. Gerlands Beiträge zur Geophysik (in German). 7. Forwarded by Consul Paul Röhll. Leipzig: Wilhelm Engelmann: 411.
- Klasson, Robert (2016). Бакинский дневник [Baku Diaries] (PDF) (in Russian).
- Lutz, Martin; Sabean, David Warren (2022). "Kinship, conflict and transnational coordination: the Siemens family's globalisation strategies in the nineteenth century". Social History. 47 (2): 141–168. doi:10.1080/03071022.2022.2044206.
- Mark, Rudolf A. (2012). Im Schatten des „Great Game“: Deutsche „Weltpolitik“ und russischer Imperialismus in Zentralasien 1871–1914 [In the Shadow of the "Great Game": German "World Policy" and Russian Imperialism in Central Asia 1871–1914] (in German). Paderborn: Ferdinand Schöningh. ISBN 978-3-657-77579-8.
- Gumbatova, Tamara (2008). Баку и немцы [Baku and Germans] (in Russian). Baku: Çaşıoğlu. ISBN 978-9952-27-108-9.
- "Evening IX: Concert, Tableaux Vivants, Dances (Advertisement)" (PDF). Kaspii (in Russian). 5 December 1904. p. 2.
