= Industrialization in the Russian Empire =

Industrialization in the Russian Empire saw the development of an industrial economy, whereby labor productivity increased and the demand for industrial goods was partially provided from within the empire. Industrialization in the Russian Empire was a reaction to the industrialization in Western European countries.

The first steps related to accelerating the development of industry were taken during the reign of Peter the Great. However, the beginning of the introduction of machine production in leading industries and vehicles was in the second quarter of the 19th century. This period is considered to be the beginning of the industrial revolution in Russian Empire. The industrialization process continued until 1917, later in the years of Soviet industrialization. Russia was in the process of trying to catch up with the advanced countries of the West in terms of industrial development.

== History ==
=== Industry during the reign of Peter I ===
Peter I was aware of the need for the country to gain land for the development of efficient trade. To accomplish this task, a combat-ready army was needed. The combat readiness of the army depended directly on the level of development of the economy and, above all, on the degree of development in metallurgical, textile, cloth and other industries.

The first years of the 18th century were associated with the active construction of metallurgical factories. In 1702–1707. Lipetsk, Kozminsk and Borin factories with a total number of more than 500 workers are being built. In Karelia in 1703, the equally large Petrovsky and Povenetsky plants were built.

A little later, in 1704–1705, the Konchezersky plant and the Tyrpitsky ammunition plants will appear. All these plants used raw materials of a low level and the quality of the metal produced was not the best, but the small distance of these plants from the place of hostilities was invaluable.

At the same time, metallurgical plants were being built in the Ural (region), including a large silver mining plant was founded in 1704 in Nerchinsk, which was of great importance for the future development of the monetary business and the country's economy. As a result of this construction, an industry was created that was able to equip the army with powerful artillery and other weapons.

Over 28 private and company-owned and 7 state-owned iron factories, one state-owned and two company-owned copper plants, arose in Central Russia in the first third of the 18th century. In the Urals there are about 15 copper state-owned and private factories, and about 10 and 5 state-owned iron factories.

In the first quarter of the 18th century, due to a sharp increase in the size of the army and navy, the textile and especially sailing-and-linen industry began to develop rapidly. In particular, the Moscow Admiralty Sailing Factory, which employed more than a thousand people. In the 1720s century the number of textile manufactories reached 40 (of which 24 are only in Moscow). According to various sources, from Peter the Great, from 98 to 180 relatively large manufactories were built.

However, Peter I conducted a series of laws that aggravated the situation of peasants and prevented the creation of a wage labor market.

=== Industry during the reign of Catherine II ===
After the death of Peter I, up to the middle of the century, the industry of Russia, in spite of everything, continued to develop. By 1750, about a hundred metallurgical plants were already operating, and cast iron smelting reached approximately 2 million pounds. In the middle of the 18th century, Russia took first place in the world in the smelting of cast iron and became its main exporter to Europe.

A new period of significant development of the industry is associated with the reign of Catherine II. The most noticeable growth was observed in the field of metallurgy and the textile industry, and details of industrialization in the field of agriculture are also visible. In the field of metallurgical production and metalworking, at the beginning of Catherine's reign there were 182 enterprises, and at the end of the 18th century about 200. The growth was small, but now they were larger enterprises.

The sailing and linen industry also developed. Russian canvas was in great and constant demand in England and other sea powers. At the end of the sixties in the textile industry, there were 231 large enterprises, including 73 woollen factories, 85 linen and 60 silk. At the end of the 18th century, the number of textile enterprises reached 1082, of which 158 were woollen, 318 were linen and 357 were silk. Thus, for more than three decades, there was a more than four-fold increase.

Along with traditional extensive methods, intensive methods began to be used more and more widely. In agricultural practice, especially in the largest, richest farms, plough and fertilizers were used. Sowings of agricultural crops expanded, including more valuable ones - wheat, potatoes, buckwheat, industrial and medicinal plants, etc.

At this time, there was a certain interest of the "enlightened" nobility in improving the agricultural sector. The founding of the Free Economic Society (1765) contributed to the propaganda of the achievements of agronomic science, although so far on a "focal" scale.

Catherine II also took steps to mitigate the situation of peasants in the Russian Empire. The decrees of Catherine II on the ban on the purchase of serfs to factories and their registration with enterprises and on the free foundation of industrial enterprises for all sectors of society (1775) intensified the process of attracting hired workers to production. In turn, manufactories continued to use both hired and non-free labour. Serf labour continued to dominate mining and metallurgy, especially in the Urals. In large industrial enterprises by the end of the century, over 40% of employees were wage-earners. Wage labour was especially prevalent in the textile industry and exceeded 90% However, unfree labor in feudal Russia still impeded the transition to factory production.

=== Industrial development in the first half of the 19th century ===
An important problem of industrialization in the Russian Empire at that time was the technical component of this process. In England, starting from the 1760s, and after it in other Western European countries, there was a process of accumulation of technical experience and the introduction of technical inventions, which became the condition for the transition to machine production. In the Russian Empire, the manufacturing owners did not show much interest in innovations.

Only at the end of the 18th century, at the government's initiative, did a discussion begin on a large-scale project that concerned the use of English comb out and spinning machines. However, manual labor continued to dominate almost completely in Russian factories until the 1840s. At this time, the import of machinery and machine tools into the country increased. In the years 1841-1845 they were imported in the amount of 668 thousand rubles, in the next five years this amount more than doubled, and in the first half of the 1850s amounted to more than two million rubles. This started the process of crowding out the manufacturing with a factory, which proceeded extremely unevenly in different industries and in different regions.

On the basis of a centralized manufactory, industries such as paper and glass developed, the products of which mainly met the country's needs. Since the beginning of the century, the number of enterprises in paper production had almost tripled and reached 165. Here about 80% of production was produced using machines.

Crisis phenomena were observed in the mining industry of the Urals, where manufactory production was based on monopoly and forced labor. In the pre-reform period, cast iron smelting increased slightly (from 10 million pounds at the beginning of the century to 18 million pounds by 1861). At this time, in the UK smelting pig iron reached 240 million pounds. And while at the end of the 18th century Russia accounted for about a third of the world smelting of pig iron, by 1860 its share did not exceed 4%. Weak technical base made the production of metallurgical plants noncompetitive. The labor productivity of workers attached to factories was low, and the owners of mining plants did not introduce steam engines, relying on the cheapness of manual labor.

Only in the 1850s, the obsolete critical method of iron production began to be replaced by puddling. However, the owners of the plants did not use coal for puddling, which led to large-scale deforestation, to an increase in production costs and to an even wider use of non-economic forms of exploitation of workers. The crisis in the mining industry also affected the position of state-owned military factories, where modern metalworking and mechanical production increasingly dealt with the supply of low-quality raw materials.

The serfdom slowed down the introduction of technical discoveries and inventions into the industry. The low cost of serfdom made it unprofitable to replace it with machine labor based on the use of steam engines. Entrepreneurs were not interested in raising the qualifications of the workforce; labor productivity at state-owned and private-owned manufactories grew extremely slowly. An incomplete industrial revolution doomed the country to lagging behind industrialized European countries. The completion of the industrial revolution and the overcoming of this lag was directly related to the elimination of serfdom, since serfdom was the main obstacle to the emergence in Russia of a free wage labor market.

=== Industrial development in the second half of the 19th century ===
In 1861, peasant reform (also known as the abolition of serfdom) occurred within the empire. This reform created the conditions necessary for the victory of the capitalist mode of production. The culmination of these conditions was the personal liberation of 23 million serfs who formed the wage labor market.

In the post-reform period, an industrial revolution ended in Russia. After 1861, all the prerequisites arose for the final conversion of manufacturing into factory production. By the early 1880s, the main industrial products began to be produced at factories and plants using machines and mechanisms driven by steam.

Factory production on the basis of civilian labor pushed into the background manufactory in all leading industries. At the end of the 1870s, 58% of the textile industry was produced on 50 thousand mechanical looms. Factories accounted for three-quarters of textile and more than 80% of metal products, about 90% of sugar production. Two-thirds of the energy needed for metallurgy came from steam engines and turbines. Manual labor occupied leading positions only in the leather, furniture, and in some sectors of the food industry.

In the late 1880s and up to the end of the century, primarily heavy industry developed at a rapid pace, the volume of production of which increased by 4 times, and the number of workers doubled. If in the 80s large mechanized enterprises were rare among the huge mass of artisanal production, then in the late 19th - early 20th centuries. In all major sectors, large and largest enterprises dominated.

The industrial development of the 1880s was marked by extreme regional and sectoral unevenness. At the end of the decade, it ended with a new systemic crisis, which was part of the recession in world industrial production and was accompanied by an agrarian crisis. In search of a way out of this difficult situation, the government made deliberate efforts that led to an unprecedented industrial boom that began in 1893. The years of this boom were a time of economic modernization of Russia under the auspices of the state.

=== Industry of the Russian Empire of the 20th century before the First World War ===
In the industry of the Russian Empire there was a period of slowdown in comparison with the end of the 19th century.

Production of the main types of industrial products in 1887–1913, million poods

Types of products	1887	1900	1913
Cast iron	36.1	176.8	283
Coal	276.2	986.4	2215
Steel and iron	35.5	163	246.5
Petroleum	155	631.1	561.3
Cotton (Recycling)	11.5	16	25.9
Sugar	25.9	48.5	75.4

With the start of operations of the Baku district, Russia in 1900 came out on top in oil production. After the crisis of 1899, industrial production increased 1.5 times in 1909–1913, with heavy industry - 174%, light - 137%.

The volume of industrial production in Russia in 1913 amounted to 6938.9 million rubles. In 1913, Russia's share in world industry was 5.3% (fifth place in the world).

Shares of Russia, United States, Great Britain, Germany and France in world industrial production (in%) <

Country	1881–1885	1896–1900	1913
United States	28.6	30.1	35.8
United Kingdom	26.6	19.5	14.0
Germany	13.9	16.6	15.7
France	8.6	7.1	6.4
Russia	3.4	5.0	5.3

Certain industries of the Russian Empire were characterized by extremely rapid growth. From 1894 to 1914, in the Russian Empire, coal production increased by 306%, oil - by 65% (growth stopped in 1901, since then no increase has been observed), gold - by 43%, copper - by 375%; cast iron - by 250%; iron and steel - by 224%. Russia supplied 50% of world egg exports; it owned 80% of the world production of flax.

At the beginning of the 20th century, the Russian Empire, along with the United States, occupied a leading position in world agriculture. This is especially evident in the example of grain crops: in the first 14 years of the 20th century, the sown area increased by 15%, grain yield by 10%, grain harvest per capita by more than 20%. Gross grain harvest - 5637 million poods (92.5 million tons) - 1st place in the world (half the world rye crop, second place in wheat harvest), as well as 1st place in grain export - 647.8 million poods were exported (10.61 million tons) of grain. The total volume of grain exports amounted to 651 million rubles. Russia ranked 1st in the production and export of butter (77576 tons of butter exported).

At the same time, in terms of per capita GDP, the Russian Empire did not belong to world leaders. GDP per capita, calculated in 1990 Giri-Khamis international dollars, in the Russian Empire in 1913 was $1,488 per person with a world average of $1,524, which was below the level of all European countries except Portugal, and approximately corresponded to the level of Japan and the average Latin America level. GDP per capita was 3.5 times lower than in the United States, 3.3 times lower than in the UK, 1.7 times lower than in Italy

=== The industry of the Russian Empire in the First World War ===
Despite the complications of the First World War, the industry of the Russian Empire continued to grow. Compared to 1913, industrial production grew by 21.5%. In comparison in the same time period, industrial production in the UK decreased by 11%, and in Germany it decreased as much as 36%.

At the same time, the volume of engineering production in Russia increased 4.76 times over these three years, metal processing 3.01 times, the chemical industry 2.52 times

Also, in 1915–1917, a large-scale modernization of industry was carried out, and, unlike the pre-war period, most part of the equipment was produced by domestic enterprises.

Production and import of industrial equipment

Year	Import (million rubles in prices in 1913)	Russian production (million rubles in prices in 1913)	Share of Russian production in total equipment, in %	The growth of Russian equipment production (1913=100)
1913	156.3	69.3	30.7	100.0
1914	114.0	86.6	43.2	125.0
1915	42.4	163.2	79.4	235.5
1916	108.2	218.5	66.9	315.3
1917	52.7	216.0	80.4	311.7

On the eve of the revolution, the country's national income was 16.4 billion rubles (7.4% of the world total). According to this indicator, the Russian Empire ranked fourth after the United States, Germany and the British Empire.

According to Orlov, Georgieva, and Georgiev the development of industry reached the peak both in quantitative and in qualitative terms towards the end of the existence of the Russian Empire, on the eve of the February Revolution. Subsequent industrialization was carried out in the USSR in the late 1920s using administrative-command methods based on five-year plans under totalitarianism.

== See also ==
- Electricity sector in Imperial Russia
- Textile sector in Imperial Russia
