= Chyornoye Ozero =

Chyornoye Ozero (Russian: Чёрное озеро) is the name of several rural localities in Russia:

- Chyornoye Ozero, Republic of Bashkortostan, a village in Yevbulyaksky Selsoviet of Askinsky District of the Republic of Bashkortostan.
- Chyornoye Ozero, Republic of Khakassia, a selo in Chernoozerny Selsoviet of Shirinsky District of the Republic of Khakassia.
- Chyornoye Ozero, Mari El Republic, a settlement in Chernoozersky Rural Okrug of Zvenigovsky District of the Mari El Republic.
- Chyornoye Ozero, Republic of Tatarstan, a village in Nurlatsky District of the Republic of Tatarstan.
