= Shatursky District =

Shatursky District Шатурский район (Russian)
- District
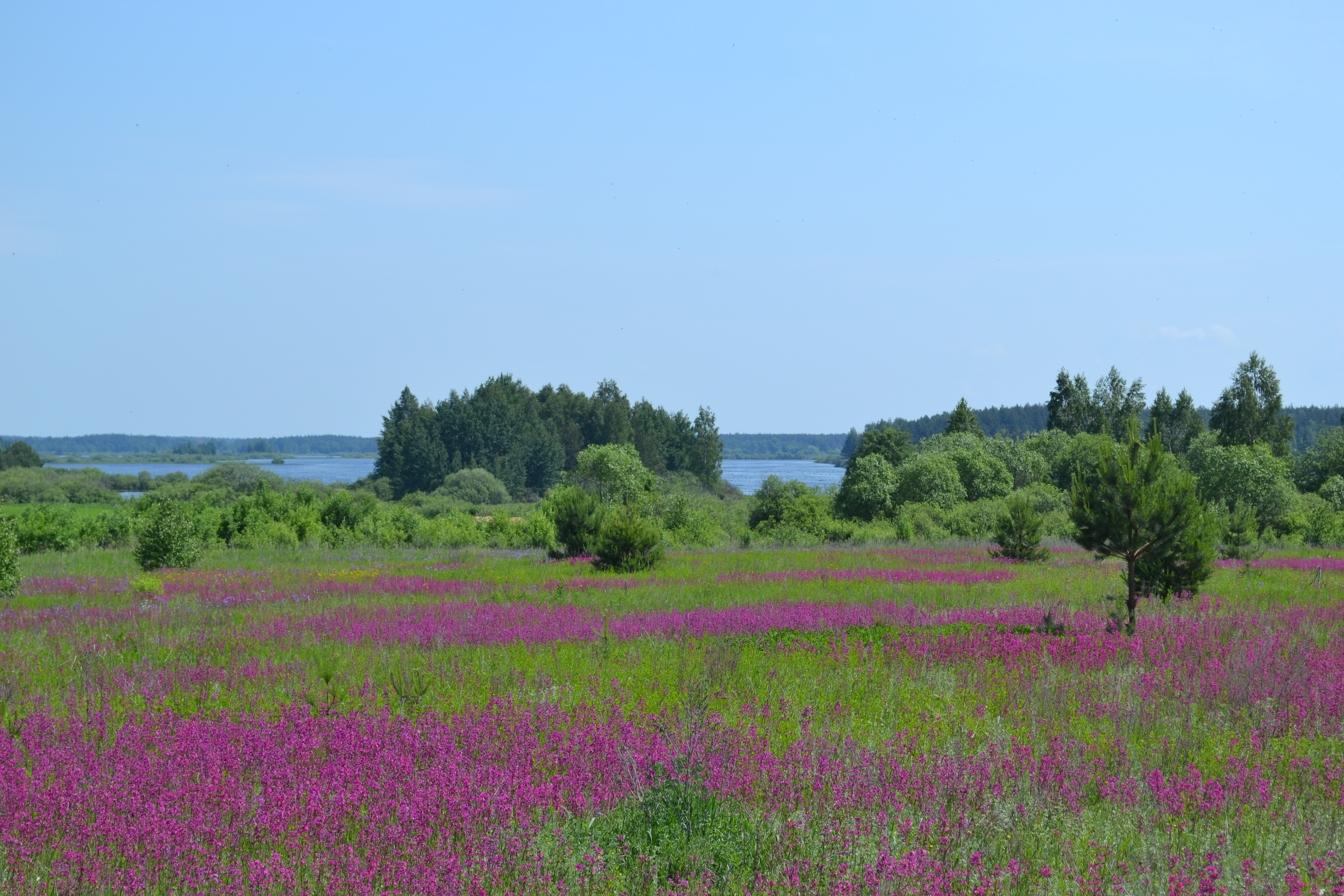
- Rural field in Shatursky District

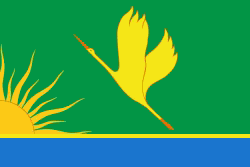
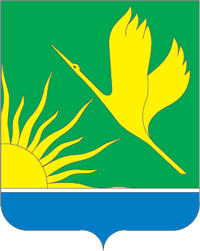
- Flag Coat of arms
- Location of Shatursky District in Moscow Oblast (before July 2012)
- Coordinates: 55°34′N 39°32′E
- Country: Russia
- Federal subject: Moscow Oblast
- Administrative center: Shatura

Area
  - Total: 2,640.15 km^{2} (1,019.37 sq mi)

Population (2010 Census)
  - Total: 72,087
  - Density: 27.304/km^{2} (70.717/sq mi)
  - Urban: 54.9%
  - Rural: 45.1%

Administrative structure
  - Administrative divisions: 1 Towns, 2 Work settlements, 4 Rural settlements
  - Inhabited localities: 1 cities/towns, 2 urban-type settlements, 184 rural localities

Municipal structure
  - Municipally incorporated as: Shatursky Municipal District
  - Municipal divisions: 3 urban settlements, 4 rural settlements
- Time zone: UTC+3 (MSK)
- OKTMO ID: 46657000
- Website: http://www.shatura.ru/

Shatursky District (Russian: Шату́рский райо́н) is an administrative and municipal district (raion), one of the thirty-six in Moscow Oblast, Russia. It is located in the east of the oblast. The area of the district is 2,640.15 square kilometers (1,019.37 sq mi). Its administrative center is the town of Shatura. Population: 72,087 (2010 Census); 70,967 (2002 census); 73,521 (1989 Soviet census). The population of Shatura accounts for 45.6% of the district's total population.

== Ecology ==
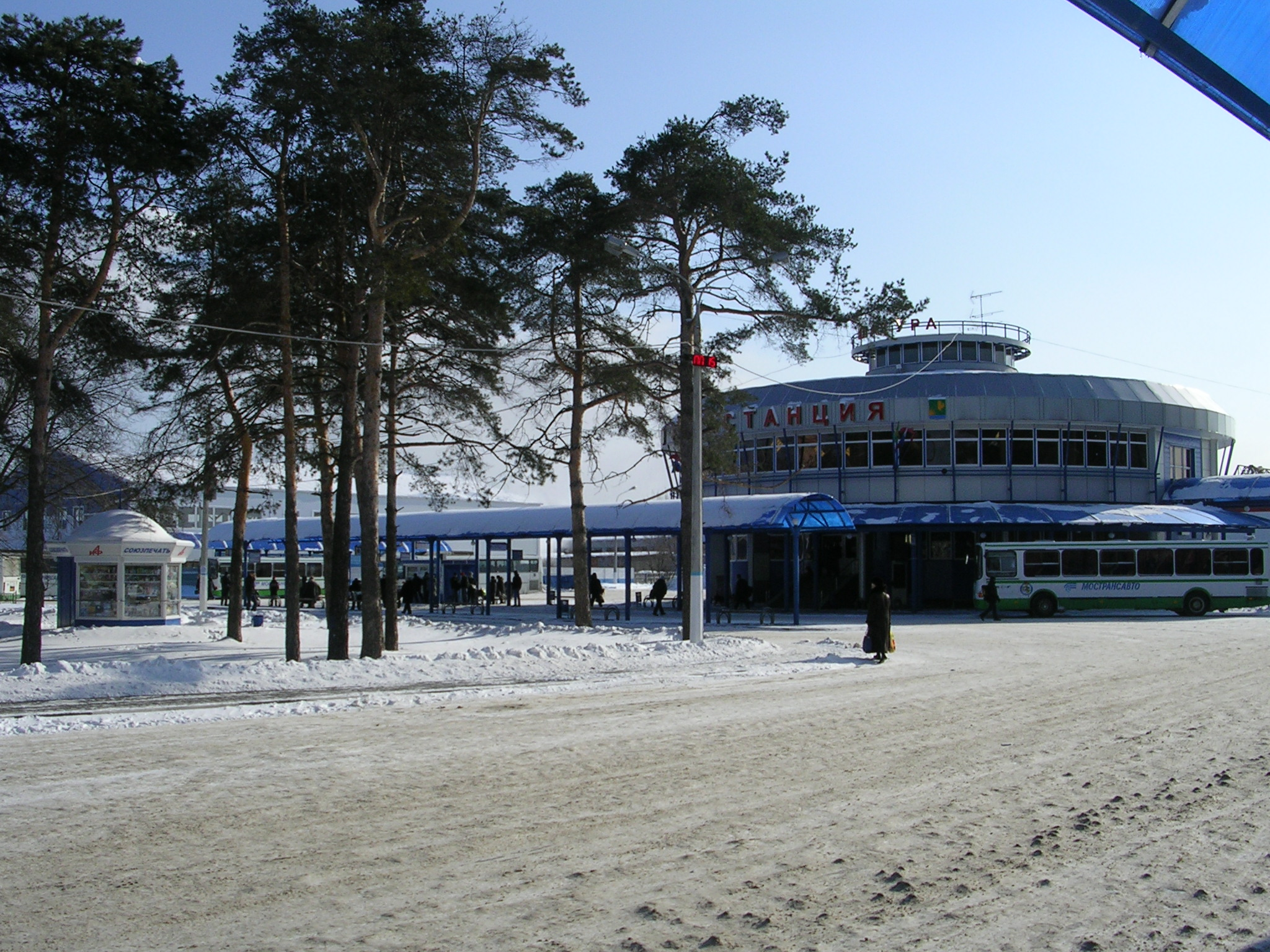
Shatura bus station in winter

Just like in all of the Meshchera Lowlands, the district contains many forests, rivers, lakes, and swamps. Its forests are mostly coniferous and pine, and occupy about 45% of the total territory of the district.

There are about forty-eight different lakes located within the district, including Svyatoye, Muromskoye, Velikoye, Karasevo, Spasskoye, Torbeyevskoye, Dolgoye, Glubokoye, and Dubovoye. There are also six different rivers that pass through its territory.

Fires occur often in the district during summer. The most memorable ones were in 1972 and 2002.
