= Yusif Mammadaliyev =

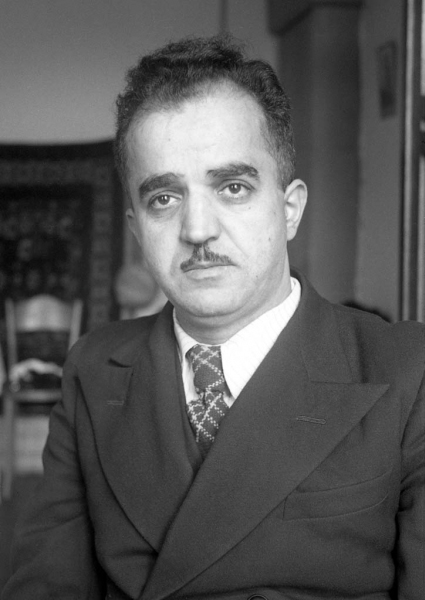
- Born: December 31, 1905; Ordubad, Nakhichevan uezd, Erivan Governorate, Russian Empire
- Died: December 15, 1961 (aged 55); Baku, Azerbaijan SSR
- Education: Moscow State University (1932)
- Awards: Order of Lenin; Order of the Red Banner of Labour; Stalin Prize
- Scientific career
- Fields: Chemistry
- Workplaces: National Academy of Sciences of the Azerbaijan SSR

Yusif Haydar oglu Mammadaliyev (Azerbaijani: Yusif Heydər oğlu Məmmədəliyev; December 31, 1905 – December 15, 1961) was an Azerbaijani and Soviet chemist. He was a doctor of chemistry, academician of the National Academy of Sciences of the Azerbaijan SSR, and was the president of the National Academy of Sciences of the Azerbaijan SSR.

== Biography ==
He was born on December 31, 1905, in Ordubad.

In 1923, he entered the higher pedagogical institute of Baku. In 1926, after successful graduation from the institute, he taught at secondary school for 3 years. In 1929, he became a second-year student of the chemistry faculty of MSU, from which he graduated in 1932. He was a student of Nikolay Zelinsky and Aleksei Balandin and specialized in organocatalysis. Upon completion of his time at MSU, he worked in Moscow at the chemical plant No. 1, and then was transferred to Azerbaijan, where he managed the Cathedra of organic chemistry of the agricultural college of Azerbaijan at first. Then he worked (1933–1945) at the Azerbaijan Research Institute of Oil, where he became the manager of the laboratory. His work was dedicated to scientific problems of petrochemistry and organocatalysis and was closely connected with the development of domestic oil-refining and petrochemical industry. Some developments assumed as the basis of new industrial processes.

Starting from 1934, he led the great pedagogical work at Azerbaijan University named after S. M. Kirov, sequentially holding the positions of associate professor, professor, head of a cathedra and rector (1954–1958). In 1933, Candidate of Chemistry was conferred on Yusif Mammadaliyev without defence of dissertation.

In 1942, he became a Doctor of Chemistry and in 1943, a professor; in 1945, the academician of the Academy of Sciences of the Azerbaijan SSR (from the establishment of the academy). He was the director of Oil Academy of the Azerbaijan SSR. In 1946, he was nominated to the work in the Ministry of Oil Industry, where he became the chairman of the scientific-technical council of the ministry. In 1951–1954, he was the academician-secretary of physics, chemistry and oil departments of the Academy of Sciences of the Azerbaijan SSR, in 1954–1958, the rector of Azerbaijan State University.

From 1947–1951 and 1958–1961 Mammadaliyev was the president of the Academy of Sciences of the Azerbaijan SSR. The Institute of Petrochemical Processes was established in Baku on Mammadaliyev's initiative.

In 1958, Mammadaliyev was chosen as the corresponding member of the Academy of Sciences of the Azerbaijan SSR.

Mammadaliyev died in 1961.

== Scientific effort ==
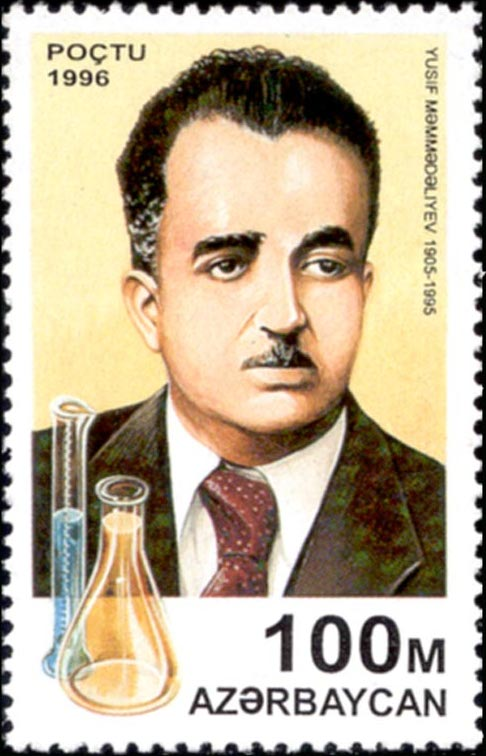
Stamp of Azerbaijan dedicated to the 90th anniversary of Yusif Mammadaliyev

The main scientific works of Yusif Mammadaliyev are related to catalytic progressing of oil and Fuel oil. He is the founder of petrochemistry in Azerbaijan. He suggested new methods of chlorination and bromination of different hydrocarbons with participation of catalysts and especially showed the ways of obtaining carbon tetrachloride, chloromethane, dichloromethane and other valuable products by means of chlorination of methane, initially in stationary catalyst, and then in hot layer. Researches in the sphere of catalytic alkylation of aromatic, paraffinic, naphthenes hydrocarbons with the help of unsaturated hydrocarbons, enabled the synthesis of the components of aviation fuels on industrial scale. The major works were executed in the sphere of catalytic aromatization of benzine fraction of Baku oil, obtainment of washing agents, flint-organic compounds, production of plastics from pyrolized products, analysis of Naftalan oil's action mechanism. He repeatedly represented Azerbaijan in congresses, conventions and symposiums held by the USSR, United States, Italy, France, England, Moldavia, Poland and other countries.

== Awards ==
- Order of Lenin
- Order of the Red Banner of Labour
- Order of the Badge of Honour
- Stalin Prize

== See also ==
- Movsum bey Khanlarov

== Literature ==
- Мир-Бабаев М.Ф. Научный подвиг гения (к 100-летию со дня рождения Ю.Г. Мамедалиева) – «Consulting & Business», 2005, No.8, с.8–12.
- Mir-Babayev M.F. The role of Azerbaijan in the World's oil industry – “Oil-Industry History” (USA), 2011, v. 12, no. 1, p. 109–123.
- Mir-Babayev M.F. Formula of Victory (Yusif Mamedaliyev) - "SOCAR plus", 2012, Autumn, p. 100–111.
