= Chyornoye Ozero, Republic of Bashkortostan =

Village in Askinsky District, Bashkortostan, Russia

Chyornoye Ozero Чёрное Озеро
- Village
- Location within Bashkortostan Location within Russia
- Coordinates: 56°02′N 56°26′E
- Country: Russia
- Region: Bashkortostan
- District: Askinsky District
- Time zone: UTC+5:00

Chyornoye Ozero (Russian: Чёрное Озеро; Bashkir: Ҡаракүл, Qarakül) is a rural locality (a village) in Yevbulyaksky Selsoviet, Askinsky District, Bashkortostan, Russia. The population was 36 as of 2010. There is 1 street.

== Geography ==
Chyornoye Ozero is located 15 km southwest of Askino (the district's administrative centre) by road. Kushkul is the nearest rural locality.
