= Russian Technical Society =

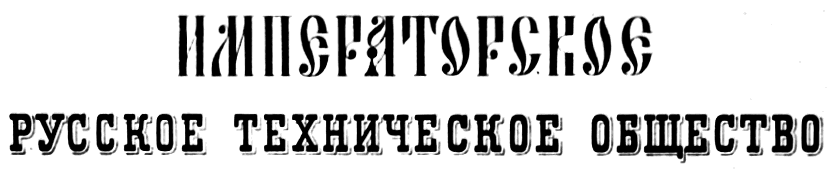

The Russian Technical Society (RTS) was founded as the Imperial Russian Technical Society (IRTS) in 1866 bringing together scientists, engineers, and others in order to promote technological development. It was by the government Ministries of Education and Finance, and was supported by other public agencies and by industry. It set out to bolster the further the development of Russia's manufacturing and production industries, through facilitating new inventions and the application of technology. Dmitry Mendeleyev and Peter Kochubei played a leading role in the organisation.

In 1895 the society criticised Ludwig Knoop for holding back the Russian textile industry by exclusively importing English textile machinery.

In 1914 it participated in the mobilisation of scientists and technicians behind the war effort by creating an information bureau. This provided information for industry and state and local governments.

== Organisation and structure ==
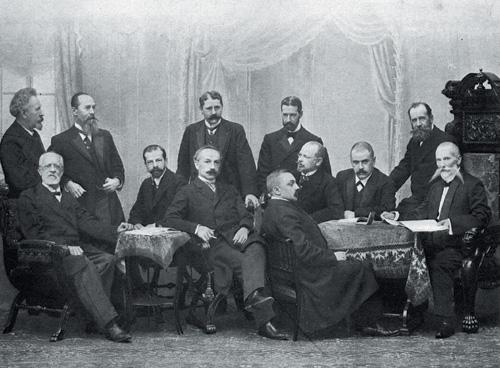
Key members of the 5th photographic department of the Imperial Russian Technical Society 1904

1. Chemical technology and metallurgy (1866)
2. Mechanics and mechanical technology (1866)
3. Civil engineering and mining (1866)
4. Military and naval technology (1866)
5. Photography and its applications (1878) founded by Vyacheslav Sreznevsky.
6. Electrical engineering, (1878) founded by Vladimir Chikolev.
7. Aeronautics (1880)
8. Railway business (1881)
9. Technical education (1884)
10. Agriculture (by 1914)
11. Industrial and economic (by 1914)
12. Labour assistance (by 1914)
13. Mountain (by 1914)
14. Techniques of mining and rural economy
15. Reclamation(1916)
16. Fuel (1916)
