= Vladimir Chikolev =

Russian electrical engineer

Vladimir Nikolaevich Chikolev (23 July 23 [4 August], 1845, Peski - 22 February [6 March], 1898, St Petersburg) was a Russian scientist who specialised in electrical engineering. He founded the company Elektrotekhnik.

He attended the Moscow Alexander Orphan Military School, before becoming a volunteer at the Imperial Moscow University where he attracted the attention of Professor Jakov Tsvetkov of the Petrovsk Agricultural Academy who appointed him as an assistant.
