= Shatura Thermal Power Plant =

Thermal Power Plant in Shatura, Moscow Oblast, Russia

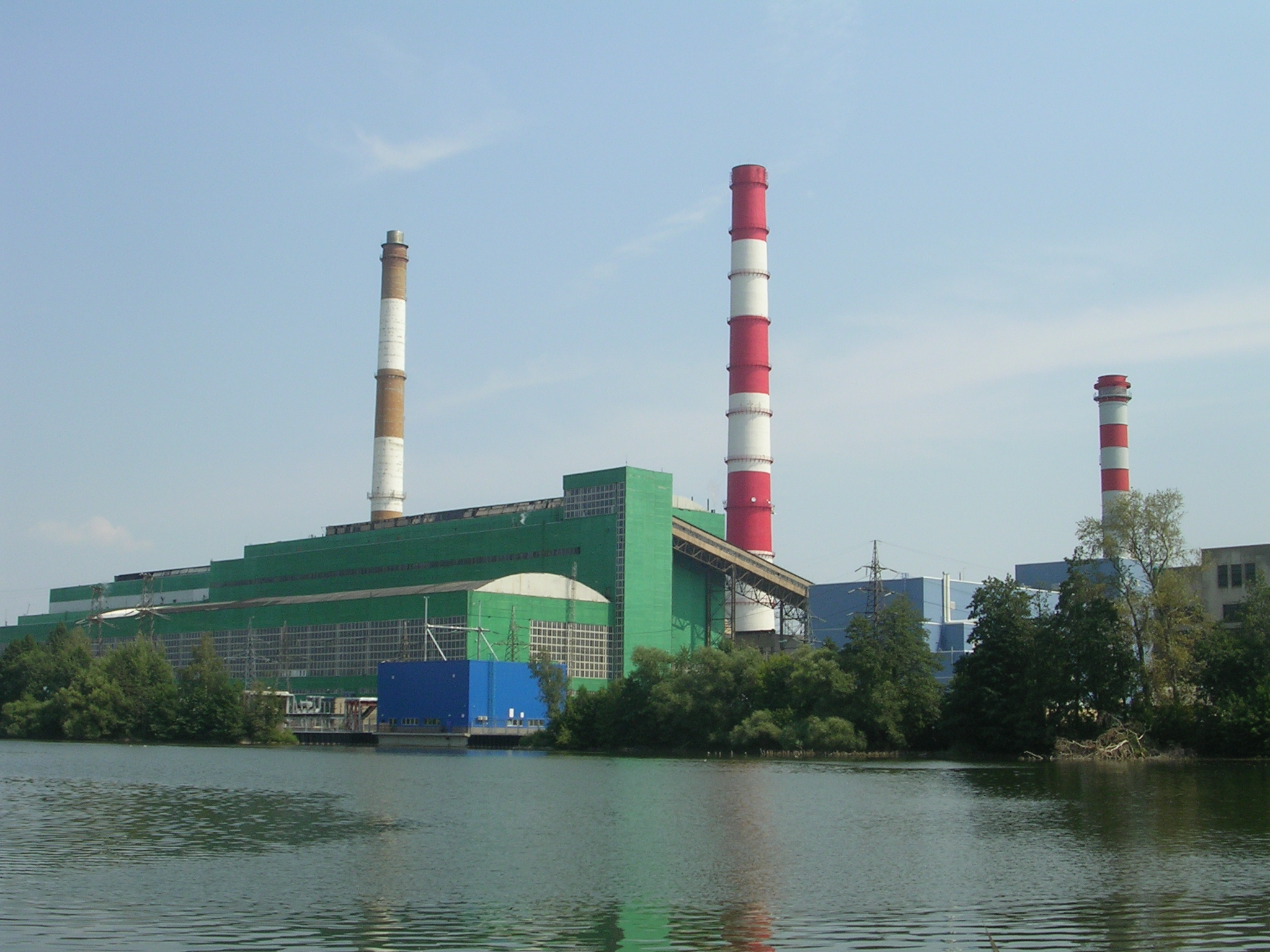
- Country: Russia
- Location: Shatura, Moscow Oblast
- Coordinates: 55°35′00″N 39°33′40″E
- Status: Operational
- Commission date: 1925
- Owner: Unipro

Thermal power station
- Primary fuel: Natural gas (78%)
- Secondary fuel: Peat (11.5%)
- Tertiary fuel: Fuel oil (6.8%); Coal (3.7%)
- Combined cycle?: Yes

Power generation
- Units operational: 2 × 210 MW; 3 × 200 MW; 1 × 80 MW; 1 × 400 MW
- Nameplate capacity: 1,500 MW

External links
- Website: www.unipro.energy/about/structure/affiliate/shaturskaya/indicators/
- Commons: Related media on Commons

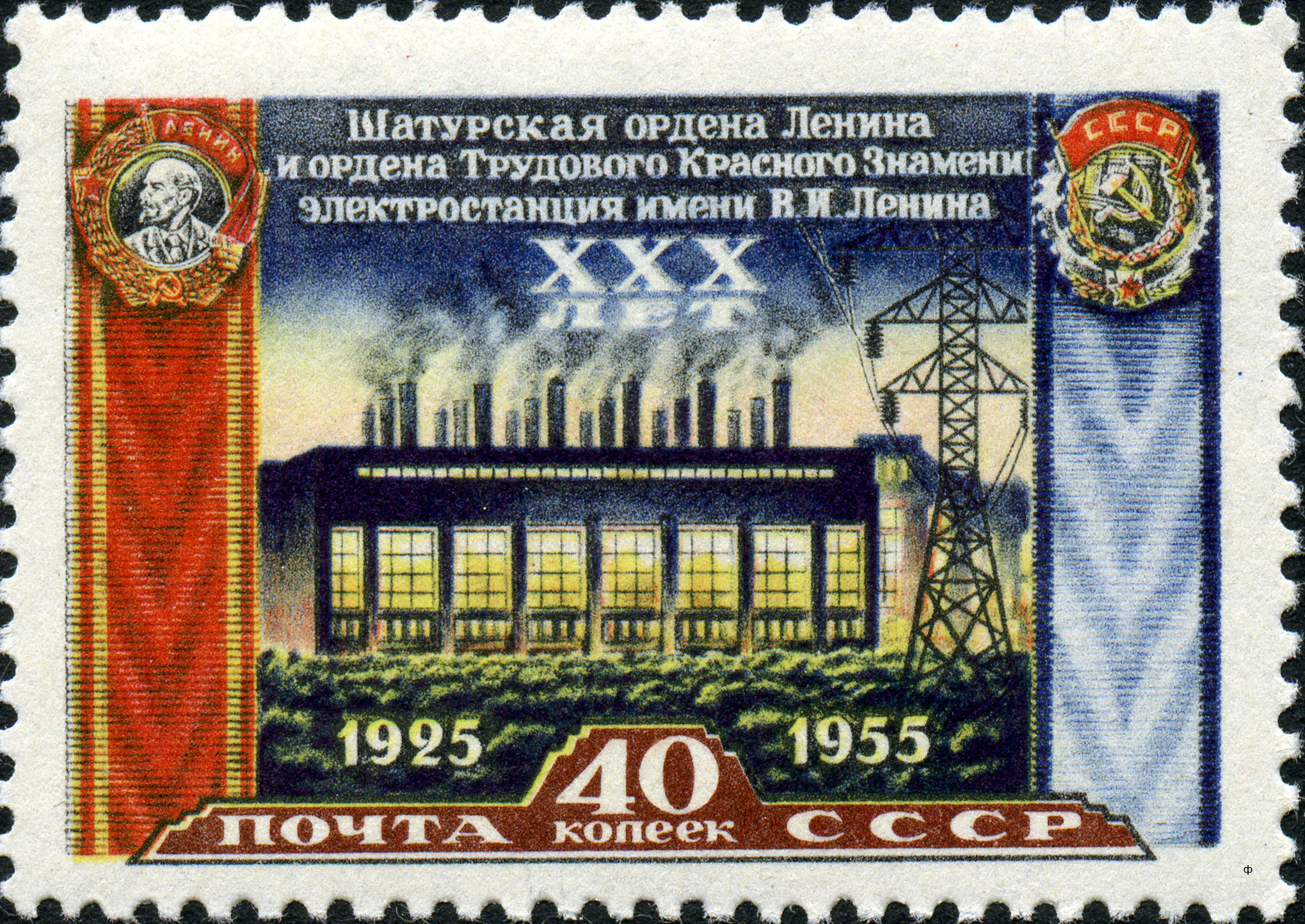
Shaturskaya GRES on a 1956 stamp

The Shatura Thermal Power Plant (Russian: Шату́рская ГРЭС, romanized: Shaturskaya GRES, or GRES-5 locally) is one of the oldest power stations in Russia. The facility is located in Shatura, Moscow Oblast, and generates power by utilizing two 210 MW units, three 200 MW units, and one 80 MW unit, for a total capacity of 1.1 GW. Built in 1925, the power station initially used peat as its fuel source. Later on, the power plant was diversified into multifuel. In 2010, a new combined cycle block of 400 MW was installed. The 80 and 400 MW blocks cannot work on peat.

On November, 23, 2025, during the Russo-Ukrainian war, it was reported by Reuters that Shatura was struck by at least one Ukrainian drone causing a fire.

== Balance of fuel ==
In 2005 the fuel use was:

- Natural gas: 78%
- Peat: 11.5%
- Fuel oil: 6.8%
- Coal: 3.7%

== See also ==
- List of fuel oil power stations
- List of largest power stations in the world
- List of power stations in Russia
