= List of extreme temperatures in Sweden =

Here is a list of the hottest and coldest temperatures ever recorded in various locations in Sweden since 1860. Due to the continental nature of the Swedish climate, the entire country is prone to absolute extremes, even though averages are normally moderate in most of the country.

== Highest temperatures ever recorded in Sweden ==
Temperature	Location	Date recorded
38.0 °C	Målilla, Småland	June 29, 1947
38.0 °C	Ultuna, Uppland	July 9, 1933
37.4 °C	Uppsala, Uppland	July 9, 1933
37.2 °C	Målilla, Småland	July 21, 2022
37.0 °C	Härsnäs, Östergötland	July 21, 2022
36.9 °C	Harads, Norrbotten	July 17, 1945
36.9 °C	Horn, Östergötland	July 21, 2022
36.9 °C	Linköping-Malmslätt, Östergötland	July 21, 2022
36.8 °C	Holma, Östergötland	August 9, 1975
36.8 °C	Ulvhäll, Södermanland	July 9, 1933
36.8 °C	Ultuna, Uppland	July 11, 1901
36.4 °C	Kvarn, Östergötland	July 21, 2022
36.4 °C	Holma, Östergötland	August 8, 1975
36.4 °C	Lessebo, Småland	August 8, 1975
36.4 °C	Gävle, Gästrikland	June 30, 1947
36.2 °C	Eskilstuna, Södermanland	July 21, 2022
36.2 °C	Målilla, Småland	August 10, 1992
36.2 °C	Målilla, Småland	August 8, 1975
36.0 °C	Örebro-Ekeby, Närke	August 7, 1975
36.0 °C	Sala, Västmanland	August 6, 1975
36.0 °C	Ängelholm, Skåne	June 30, 1947
36.0 °C	Västerås, Västmanland	July 9, 1933
36.0 °C	Experimentalfältet, Uppland	July 9, 1933
36.0 °C	Sveg, Härjedalen	July 8, 1933
36.0 °C	Borås, Västergötland	July 20, 1901

== Highest temperature readings (provincial records) ==
Temperature	Location	Province	Date recorded
100.4 °F / 38 °C	Målilla	Småland	June 29, 1947
100.4 °F / 38 °C	Ultuna	Uppland	July 9, 1933
98.6 °F / 37 °C	Härsnäs	Östergötland	July 21, 2022
98.4 °F / 36.9 °C	Harads	Norrbotten	July 17, 1945
98.2 °F / 36.8 °C	Ulvhäll	Södermanland	July 9, 1933
97.5 °F / 36.4 °C	Gävle	Gästrikland	June 30, 1947
96.8 °F / 36 °C	Örebro-Ekeby	Närke	August 7, 1975
96.8 °F / 36 °C	Sala	Västmanland	August 6, 1975
96.8 °F / 36 °C	Västerås	Västmanland	July 9, 1933
96.8 °F / 36 °C	Ängelholm	Skåne	June 30, 1947
96.8 °F / 36 °C	Sveg	Härjedalen	July 8, 1933
96.8 °F / 36 °C	Borås	Västergötland	July 20, 1901
96.3 °F / 35.7 °C	Folkärna	Dalarna	August 8, 1975
95.9 °F / 35.5 °C	Torup	Halland	August 10, 1992
95.4 °F / 35.2 °C	Buttle	Gotland	August 8, 1975
95.2 °F / 35.1 °C	Söderhamn	Hälsingland	July 27, 1994
95 °F / 35 °C	Hoting	Ångermanland	July 10, 1933
94.3 °F / 34.6 °C	Hanö	Blekinge	August 9, 1975
94.3 °F / 34.6 °C	Fränsta	Medelpad	August 16, 1947
94.1 °F / 34.5 °C	Åmål	Dalsland	August 11, 1975
94.1 °F / 34.5 °C	Mossen	Öland	August 7, 1975
94.1 °F / 34.5 °C	Jokkmokk	Lappland	July 17, 1945
94.1 °F / 34.5 °C	Gällivare	Lappland	July 8, 1927
93.9 °F / 34.4 °C	Höljes	Värmland	August 3, 1982
93.9 °F / 34.4 °C	Torsby	Värmland	August 3, 1982
93.9 °F / 34.4 °C	Gustavsfors	Värmland	August 7, 1975
93.6 °F / 34.2 °C	Skellefteå	Västerbotten	July 3, 1968
93.4 °F / 34.1 °C	Säve	Bohuslän	August 9, 1975
93.2 °F / 34 °C	Bölestrand	Jämtland	June 30, 1947

== Lowest temperatures ever recorded in Sweden ==
Temperature	Location	Date recorded
-53.0C	Malgovik, Lappland	December 13, 1941
-52.6C	Vuoggatjålme, Lappland	February 4, 1966
−56.9 °F / −49.4 °C	Nikkaluokta, Lappland	February 3, 1966
−56.9 °F / −49.4 °C	Nikkaluokta, Lappland	February 2, 1966
−56.2 °F / −49 °C	Karesuando, Lappland	January 27, 1999
−56.2 °F / −49 °C	Vuoggatjålme, Lappland	January 1, 1951
−56 °F / −48.9 °C	Naimakka, Lappland	January 27, 1999
−56 °F / −48.9 °C	Nedre Soppero, Lappland	January 27, 1999
−56 °F / −48.9 °C	Hemavan, Lappland	December 30, 1978
−55.7 °F / −48.7 °C	Vittangi, Lappland	February 3, 1966
−55.1 °F / −48.4 °C	Kattuvuoma, Lappland	February 2, 1966
−54.6 °F / −48.1 °C	Karesuando, Lappland	February 3, 1966
−54.4 °F / −48 °C	Karesuando, Lappland	January 28, 1999
−54.4 °F / −48 °C	Vuoggatjålme, Lappland	January 31, 1956
−54.4 °F / −48 °C	Vuoggatjålme, Lappland	December 31, 1950

== Lowest temperature readings (provincial records) ==
Temperature	Location	Province	Date recorded
−62.7 °F / −52.6 °C	Vuoggatjålme	Lappland	February 2, 1966
−53.9 °F / −47.7 °C	Storsjö kapell	Härjedalen	January 10, 1987
−52.8 °F / −47.1 °C	Björkfors	Norrbotten	January 31, 1956
−50.8 °F / −46 °C	Grundforsen	Dalarna	January 1, 1979
−50.8 °F / −46 °C	Särna	Dalarna	January 3, 1941
−50.4 °F / −45.8 °C	Junsele	Ångermanland	January 10, 1987
−50.4 °F / −45.8 °C	Bölestrand	Jämtland	January 6, 1950
−50.1 °F / −45.6 °C	Myrheden	Västerbotten	January 10, 1950
−46.5 °F / −43.6 °C	Ytterhogdal	Hälsingland	January 10, 1987
−46.5 °F / −43.6 °C	Ytterhogdal	Hälsingland	January 1, 1979
−43.6 °F / −42 °C	Fränsta	Medelpad	January 1, 1979
−43.6 °F / −42 °C	Knon	Värmland	January 14, 1918
−43.6 °F / −42 °C	Adolfsfors	Värmland	January 20, 1917
−39.1 °F / −39.5 °C	Uppsala	Uppland	January 24, 1875
−37.3 °F / −38.5 °C	Lommaryd	Småland	January 14, 1918
−37.3 °F / −38.5 °C	Lommaryd	Småland	January 13, 1918
−37.3 °F / −38.5 °C	Askersund	Närke	January 24, 1875
−36.9 °F / −38.3 °C	Bredviken	Dalsland	February 9, 1966
−36.2 °F / −37.9 °C	Svarteborg	Bohuslän	February 9, 1966
−36.2 °F / −37.9 °C	Kungsängens flygplats	Östergötland	February 20, 1940
−34.6 °F / −37 °C	Lanna	Västergötland	February 9, 1966
−34.6 °F / −37 °C	Bie	Södermanland	January 24, 1875
−33.7 °F / −36.5 °C	Nora	Västmanland	January 24, 1875
−33.7 °F / −36.5 °C	Västerås	Västmanland	January 24, 1875
−32.1 °F / −35.6 °C	Sandviken	Gästrikland	December 31, 1978
−31.9 °F / −35.5 °C	Åmotsbruk	Gästrikland	February 9, 1966
−29.2 °F / −34 °C	Sjöholmen	Skåne	January 26, 1942
−29.2 °F / −34 °C	Kinnared	Halland	February 20, 1940
−27 °F / −32.8 °C	Buttle	Gotland	February 9, 1966
−25.6 °F / −32 °C	Marielund	Blekinge	January 26, 1942
−25.2 °F / −31.8 °C	Ronneby	Blekinge	January 26, 1942
−20.6 °F / −29.2 °C	Ekerum	Öland	February 27, 1942

== Highest temperature of every year in Stockholm, 2000-2023 ==
Year	Temperature	Date
2000	27.3 °C	20 June
2001	31.8 °C	4 July
2002	31.0 °C	17 July
2003	30.8 °C	1 August
2004	30.6 °C	8 August
2005	32.1 °C	12 July
2006	32.9 °C	6 July
2007	31.5 °C	9 June
2008	31.3 °C	26 July
2009	30.6 °C	2 July
2010	32.5 °C	11 July
2011	29.0 °C	2 July
2012	27.0 °C	25 July
2013	29.4 °C	26 July
2014	31.9 °C	24 July
2015	30.1 °C	2 July
2016	29.8 °C	25 June
2017	28.9 °C	28 May
2018	33.5 °C	26 July
2019	32.0 °C	28 July
2020	30.6 °C	25 June
2021	33.1 °C	15 July
2022	34.5 °C	21 July
2023	30.0°C	29 June

== Top 10 warmest days in Stockholm ==
Rank	Date	Temperature
1.	6 August 1975	35.4 °C
2.	7 August 1975	35.0 °C
3.	9 July 1933	34.6 °C
4.	21 July 2022	34.5 °C
5.	8 August 1975	34.4 °C
6.	11 July 1983	34.2 °C
7.	14 July 1994	34.1 °C
8.	26 July 2018	33.5 °C
9.	13 July 1994	33.3 °C
10.	15 July 2018	33.2 °C
