= 2009 HKFC International Soccer Sevens =

2009 HKFC International Soccer Sevens is the 10th staging of this competition. It was held on 29–31 May 2009.

== Squads ==
=== Masters tournament ===
Group A

- Football For Life: Dejan Antonić, Goran Paulic, Cristiano Cordeiro, Tam Siu Wai, Marko Kraljevic, Fouad Ben Allal, Didier Six, Tansel Oender, Volker Nagel (Manager: Phillippe Bru)
- HKFC Veterans: Bob Sahawney, Richard Lant, Mark Bavis, Paul Wilson, Ashley Dyer, Terry Hill, Anto Grabo, Simon Page, Mark Grainger, Tony Hamilton-Bram
- IP Global All Stars: Fraser Digby, Chris Powell, John Beresford, Rob Lee, Des Walker, Alex Rae, Mark Robson, Steve Lomas, Gordon Durie, Stuart Slater (Managers: Paul Allen/Bobby Barnes)
- Kowloon Cricket Club: Aaron Yip, Paul McGunnigle, Steve Rigby, Garry Nelson, Ashgar Ali, Yaron Lamy, Tim Bredbury, Jim Down, Greg McGuire, Graham Archer (Manager: Paul McGunnigle)

Group B

- Discovery Bay: Paul Rae-Howard, Anton Johannes Rohner, Garry Rollinson, John Michael Fawcett, Peter Hymns, Michael David Collier, Johannes Theodorus Jozef, Peter Troy, Robin Armstrong
- GAC Blades: Graham Benstead, Paul Wood, Don O'Riordan, Jeff Eckhardt, Dave McCarthy, Péter Deszatnik, Scott Sellars, Béla Dukon, Tony Agana, Brian Deane (Manager: Dave McCarthy)
- KFC Tokyo: Kitk Neureiter, Dave Serene, Desmond Corkhill, Martin Tierney, Jay Bailcove, Graeme McDonald, Frederic Rault, Kurunathan, Hans Pompen, Russell Henderson (Manager: Kirk Neureiter)
- Yau Yee Select Veterans : Alain Lo Kwok Lun, Andy Archer, Barry Wilson, Chan Kam Fai, Chan Kam Pui, Fabio De Rosa, Jon McKinley, Laurence Rudge, Michael Grimshaw, Sean Hurley (Managers: Bob Lawson/Gavin McDermott)

Group C

- Bexton FC: Glyn McGovern, Tom Banks, Mark Tarry, Ian Webb, Nick Jackson, Richard Malley, Tony Leung, Dean Thomas, Tony Morley, Steve Walker (Manager: Tony Morley)
- Happy Valley Veterans: Chan Shu Ming, Lam Hing Lun, Li Pui, Lee Wai Man, Tam Ah Fook, Loh Wai Chi, Chan Chi Kwong, Wong Fook Wing, Koon Wing Yee, Lee Suet Fai (Manager: Lee Suet Fai)
- HKFC Chairman's Select: Dave Shaw, Neil Jensen, Mark Norman, John McLellan, Andy Hunter, Mike Sadler, Sekino Kenichi, Lee Douris, Colin Jones, Graeme Lane
- Hood All Stars: Dale Belford, Mel Hood, David Brightwell, Ian Brightwell, Richard Sneekes, Ally Mauchlen, Dave Regis, Lee Glover, Clive Walker, Stuart Storer (Manager: Mel Hood)

Group D

- Golden Rainbow: Mak Kwok Fai, Lee Fok Wing, Fok King Cheung, Tang Chi Ming, Yeung Kin Cheung, Leung Kin Bon, Yau Kin Wai, Pau Ke Yiu, Pang Kam Chuen (Manager: Clive Wong)
- Singapore Cricket Club: Yoseph Azran, Ricardo Miranda, Paul James Roberts, Steve Webster, Nahar B Daud, Bill Crawley, Len Beschizza, Jim Parkin, Bruce Loggie, John Duffy (Manager: Len Beschizza)
- Southampton Veterans: Soni Yasaratne, David Howells, David Hughes, Andy Cook, Dino Zavagno, Martin Kuhl, Neil Heaney, Kevin Watson, Richard Dryden, Darren Baird (Manager: Ian Baird)
- Team Bondi: Mark Leverick, Marcus Oxenham, Charles Kitson, Paul Clayton, Tim Chillington, Jonathan Garrick, Nick Mawdsley, Don Taylor, Stewart Montgomerie, Michael Denmark (Manager: Nick Stokes)

=== Main tournament ===
Group A

- Chengdu Blades: Liu Hangcheng, Hao Xang, Meng Ye, Peng Faneng, Zhang Yuqi, Wu Jiarui, Meng Guoqing, Yu Rui, Min Jin, Wan Xinhuo (Manager: Mr Wang)
- Rangers:Steve Lennon, Andrew Little, Rory Loy, Steve Kinniburgh, Andrew Shinnie, Gregg Wylde, Archie Campbell, Gordon Dick, Matthew Duffy, Grant Adam (Manager: Tommy Wilson)
- HKFC: Christian Capruso, Anthony Sassi, Alan Fraser, Lo Yiu Hung, Frederick Schipper, Dennis Hayworth, Andrew Russell, Jack Sealy, Niklas Sandor, Tim Jannssen (Manager: Tony Sealy)
- Tuen Mun Progoal

Group B

- Australia U18s: Kevin Olivera, Thomas Taylor, Daniel Bowles, Mitchell Bevan, Lawrence Thomas, Steven Lustica, Jason Davidson, Dimitrios Petratos, Kliment Taseski, Anthony Carlotti (Manager: Joel Freeme)
- HKFC Captain's Select: Tristan Hui, Peter Harrod, Kenneth Kwok, Mark Huff, Charlie Hunter, Stewart McInnes, Jeremy Gill, Max Poon, John Bliss, Amro Abbass (Manager: Graeme Lane)
- Sheffield FC: Graham Benstead, Lloyd Gelsthorpe, Greg Wright, Janni Lipka, Lee Cooksey, Jordan Eagers, Ash Burbeary, Andy Potter, Ben Leonard, Steve Woolley (Manager: Lee Walshaw)
- West Ham United: Peter Kurucz, Culum McNaughton, Ashley Miller, Olly Lee, Matt Fry, Bondz N'Gala, Nicholas Barrett, Daniel Kearns, Conor Okus, Anthony Edgar (Manager: Alex Dyer)

Group C

- Aston Villa: Elliott Parish, William Grocott, Matthew Roome, Ciaran Clark, Marc Albrighton, Barry Bannan, Dominik Hofbauer, Andreas Weimann, Gary Gardner, Richard Blythe (Manager: Gordon Cowans)
- Birmingham City: Jared Wilson, Krystian Pearce, Jacob Rowe, Ashley Sammons, Jake Jervis, Luke Hubbins, Shaun Timmins, Dan Preston, Tony Breeden, Jordan Mutch (Manager: Terry Westley)
- Citizen: Hisanori Takada, Sham Kwok Fai, Fung Kai Hong, Chan Man Chun, Sandro, Ma Ka Ki, Moses Mensah, Paulinho Piracicaba, Hélio (Manager: Calvin Pui)
- Singapore Cricket Club: Owen Monaghan, Andrew Hutcheon, Adam Bowden, Scott Anderson, Mahdi Souiade, Scott Star, Tan Leng, David Alonso, John McCarvel, Martin Goerojo (Manager: Owen Monaghan)

Group D

- Eastleigh FC: Freddie Toomer, Jamie Powell, Adam Gatcum, Tom Nicholas, Adam Wiltshire, Michael Green, Joe Maxwell, Chris Mason, Joe Crook, Brett Williams (Manager: Paul Wiltshire)
- Glasgow Celtic: Daniel Lafferty, Mark Millar, Ryan Conroy, Niall McGinn, Krisjanis Vallers, Paul McGowan, Gillian Sheridan, Andrew Kennedy, Mark Misum, Anton Kurakins (Managers: Danny McGrain/Willie McStay)
- Kitchee: Sang Tao, Li Hang Wui, Leung Chi Wing, Hugues Nanmi, Lam Ka Wai, Lo Kwan Yee, Pierre-Oliver Bakalag, Cheng Lai Hin, Ngan Lok Fung, Yu Kwok Hoi (Manager: Ken Ng)
- Yau Yee League Select: Justin Chang, Michael Morton, Peter Robinson, Marco Klaus, Joe Hui, Anthony James, Christopher Pickles, James Davis, Chris Davis, Blay Brown (Managers: Simon Lam/John Southgate)

== Main Tournament – Group Stage ==
Key to colours in group tables
Teams that progressed to the Cup Quarter-finals
Teams that progressed to the Plate Quarter-finals

=== Group A ===
| Team | Pld | W | D | L | GF | GA | GD | Pts |
|---|---|---|---|---|---|---|---|---|
| Rangers | 3 | 3 | 0 | 0 | 6 | 0 | +6 | 9 |
| Tuen Mun Progoal | 3 | 1 | 1 | 1 | 2 | 3 | -1 | 4 |
| HKFC | 3 | 0 | 2 | 1 | 1 | 4 | -3 | 2 |
| Chengdu Blades | 3 | 0 | 1 | 2 | 0 | 2 | -2 | 1 |

| Team 1 | Score | Team 2 |
|---|---|---|
| Rangers | 2–0 | Tuen Mun Progoal |
| Chengdu Blades | 0–0 | HKFC |
| Rangers | 3–0 | HKFC |
| Chengdu Blades | 0–1 | Tuen Mun Progoal |
| HKFC | 1–1 | Tuen Mun Progoal |
| Rangers | 1–0 | Chengdu Blades |

=== Group B ===
| Team | Pld | W | D | L | GF | GA | GD | Pts |
|---|---|---|---|---|---|---|---|---|
| Australia U18s | 3 | 3 | 0 | 0 | 4 | 0 | +4 | 9 |
| West Ham Utd | 3 | 2 | 0 | 1 | 6 | 1 | +5 | 6 |
| Sheffield FC | 3 | 0 | 1 | 2 | 2 | 6 | -4 | 1 |
| HKFC Captain's Select | 3 | 0 | 1 | 2 | 2 | 7 | -5 | 1 |

| Team 1 | Score | Team 2 |
|---|---|---|
| West Ham Utd | 3–0 | HKFC Captain's Select |
| Australia U18s | 1–0 | Sheffield FC |
| West Ham Utd | 3–0 | Sheffield FC |
| Australia U18s | 2–0 | HKFC Captain's Select |
| HKFC Captain's Select | 2–2 | Sheffield FC |
| West Ham Utd | 0–1 | Australia U18s |

=== Group C ===
| Team | Pld | W | D | L | GF | GA | GD | Pts |
|---|---|---|---|---|---|---|---|---|
| Aston Villa | 3 | 3 | 0 | 0 | 6 | 1 | 5 | 9 |
| Citizen | 3 | 1 | 1 | 1 | 3 | 3 | 0 | 4 |
| Birmingham City | 3 | 0 | 2 | 1 | 1 | 2 | -1 | 2 |
| Singapore Cricket Club | 3 | 0 | 1 | 2 | 1 | 5 | -4 | 1 |

| Team 1 | Score | Team 2 |
|---|---|---|
| Aston Villa | 2–0 | Citizen |
| Birmingham City | 0–0 | Singapore Cricket Club |
| Aston Villa | 3–1 | Singapore Cricket Club |
| Birmingham City | 1–1 | Citizen |
| Citizen | 2–0 | Singapore Cricket Club |
| Aston Villa | 1–0 | Birmingham City |

=== Group D ===
| Team | Pld | W | D | L | GF | GA | GD | Pts |
|---|---|---|---|---|---|---|---|---|
| Glasgow Celtic | 3 | 3 | 0 | 0 | 5 | 0 | +5 | 9 |
| Eastleigh FC | 3 | 1 | 1 | 1 | 2 | 1 | +1 | 4 |
| Kitchee Invitational | 3 | 1 | 1 | 1 | 2 | 2 | 0 | 4 |
| Yau Yee League Select | 3 | 0 | 0 | 3 | 0 | 6 | -6 | 0 |

| Team 1 | Score | Team 2 |
|---|---|---|
| Glasgow Celtic | 2–0 | Yau Yee League Select |
| Eastleigh FC | 0–0 | Kitchee Invitational |
| Glasgow Celtic | 2–0 | Kitchee Invitational |
| Eastleigh FC | 2–0 | Yau Yee League Select |
| Kitchee Invitational | 2–0 | Yau Yee League Select |
| Glasgow Celtic | 1–0 | Eastleigh FC |

== Main Tournament – Knockout Stage ==
=== Plate ===
- Bottom two teams of each group entered the quarter-finals of Plate.

Quarterfinals
A3 | HKFC | 1
B4 | HKFC Captain's Select | 3
C3 | Birmingham City | 2
D4 | Yau Yee League Select | 1
B3 | Sheffield FC | 2
A4 | Chengdu Blades | 0
D3 | Kitchee Invitational | 2
C4 | Singapore Cricket Club | 0

Semifinals
B4 | HKFC Captain's Select | 0
C3 | Birmingham City | 1
B3 | Sheffield FC | 0
D3 | Kitchee Invitational | 1

Finals
C3 | Birmingham City (pen.) | 1
D3 | Kitchee Invitational | 1

=== Shield ===
- Losing teams of Cup quarter-finals entered the semi-finals of Shield.

Quarterfinals
A1 | Rangers | 2
B2 | West Ham Utd | 1
C1 | Aston Villa | 3
D2 | Eastleigh FC | 0
B1 | Australia U18s | 2
A2 | Tuen Mun Progoal | 0
D1 | Glasgow Celtic | 3
C2 | Citizen | 0

Semifinals
B2 | West Ham Utd | 2
D2 | Eastleigh FC | 0
A2 | Tuen Mun Progoal | 1
C2 | Citizen (pen.) | 1

Finals
B2 | West Ham Utd | 0
C2 | Citizen (pen.) | 0

=== Cup ===
- Top two teams of each group entered the quarter-finals of Cup.

Quarterfinals
A1 | Rangers (a.e.t.) | 1 (2)
B2 | West Ham Utd | 1 (1)
C1 | Aston Villa | 3
D2 | Eastleigh FC | 0
B1 | Australia U18s | 2
A2 | Tuen Mun Progoal | 0
D1 | Glasgow Celtic | 3
C2 | Citizen | 0

Semifinals
A1 | Rangers | 3
C1 | Aston Villa | 1
B1 | Australia U18s | 0
D1 | Glasgow Celtic | 1

Finals
A1 | Rangers | 0
D1 | Glasgow Celtic | 1

== Prize Winners ==
- Masters Tournament – Plate: Kowloon Cricket Club
- Masters Tournament – Cup: Golden Rainbow
- Main Tournament – Plate: Birmingham City
- Main Tournament – Shield: Citizen
- Main Tournament – Cup: Glasgow Celtic
- Player of the Tournament: Paul McGowan (Glasgow Celtic)
