= List of people from the London Borough of Barking and Dagenham =

Among those who were born in the London Borough of Barking and Dagenham, or have dwelt within the borders of the modern borough are:

== A ==
- Les Allen – former footballer and manager
- Tony Adams – footballer

== B ==
- Giles Barnes – professional footballer for Vancouver Whitecaps
- Adam Barrett – professional footballer for Southend United F.C.
- Rev. Abraham Blackborne – one of the longest-serving vicars of Dagenham
- Mark Blackhall – professional footballer
- Jamie Borthwick – actor
- Billy Bragg – alternative rock musician
- Sir Trevor Brooking – former professional footballer with West Ham
- James Buckley - Actor, born in Croydon, but grew up in Dagenham
- Max Bygraves – musician, moved to the area in 1945

== C ==
- George Carey – Lord Carey of Clifton Archbishop of Canterbury
- Henry Chilver (Lord Chilver) – vice-chancellor of Cranfield Institute of Technology; Chair of Milton Keynes Development Corporation
- Captain James Cook – married in Barking in 1762

== D ==
- Devlin – Grime MC
- Françoise Dior – French-born Nazi, arrested 1967
- Diversity – street dance group who won Britain's Got Talent in 2009
- Job Drain – soldier, awarded the Victoria Cross for bravery in 1914

== E ==
- David Howell Evans (aka "The Edge") – popular music musician.
- Ethelburga (d. c.680 AD) – first Abbess of Barking Abbey
- Daisy Evans – singer, past member of S Club Juniors

== F ==
- John Farnham – Australian singer; born in Dagenham
- Mark Frost (born 1962) – cricketer
- Nick Frost – actor, comedian and screenwriter
- Elizabeth Fry – prison reformer

== G ==
- Paul Gbegbaje – Britain's Got Talent 2011 finalist
- Stephen Gray – cricketer

== H ==
- Eva Hart – child survivor of RMS Titanic disaster
- Danny-Boy Hatchard – actor
- Barry Hearn – sporting events promoter; Chairman of Leyton Orient F.C. and the Professional Darts Corporation
- William Hope – soldier, awarded the Victoria Cross in 1857 for bravery during Crimean War
- Rochelle Humes – television personality and singer
- Neil Humphreys – author
- Myke Hurley – podcaster and co-founder of podcast network Relay FM

== I ==
- IMD Legion – street dance troupe, contestants on Got To Dance and Britain's Got Talent

== J ==
- Phill Jupitus – comedian, grew up in Barking
- Elliot Justham – professional footballer

== K ==
- Ross Kemp – actor, born in Barking
- Paul Konchesky – footballer, born in Barking

== L ==
- Jason Leonard – professional rugby union player, 2003 Rugby World Cup winner
- Vera Lynn – voted the most popular singer in 1939
- Lethbridge, Charlotte - a young writer, published a book named “Lucy and the time portal”

== M ==
- Megan McKenna – reality television personality
- McLean – singer
- Kevin Mitchell – boxer
- Bobby Moore – former professional footballer with West Ham; 1966 World Cup winner as captain of England
- Dudley Moore – international film star and musician
- Dean Marney – professional footballer with Burnley F.C.
- Yunus Musah - professional footballer with Valencia CF and USMNT

== O ==
- Conor Okus – professional footballer
- Hank Osasuna – actor and performance artist who grew up in Chadwell Heath
- Ayo Oyelola - NFL Safety.

== P ==
- Sara Pascoe – writer, stand-up comedian and actress
- Joseph Pearce – biographer, writer and professor; lives in New Hampshire, United States
- Stevo Pearce – owner of Some Bizzare Records
- Martin Peters – footballer, World Cup winner in 1966 with England
- Daniel Potts – professional footballer for Luton Town
- Potter Payper - UK Rapper
- Darren Pratley – footballer currently playing for Bolton Wanderers

== Q ==
- Zain Qaiser – "most prolific cyber criminal to be sentenced in the UK"

== R ==
- Alf Ramsey – 1966 World Cup winning football manager with England
- Richard of Barking – Abbot of Westminster (died 1246)
- Jo Richardson – former Member of Parliament for Barking; Shadow Spokesman for Women's Rights, 1983–1992
- Jesse Roast – footballer

== S ==
- Brian Saah – footballer, born in Rush Green
- Sandie Shaw – singer, won Eurovision Song Contest in 1967
- Anne Shelton – singing star of the 1940s and 1950s
- Stacey Solomon – 2009 X Factor finalist; winner of the British version of I'm a Celebrity, Get Me Out of Here in 2010
- Jessamy Stoddart – stage and television actress

== T ==
- Daniel Tammet – writer
- John Terry – former professional footballer
- Paul Terry – former professional footballer
- The Tremeloes – band formed by classmates Alan Howard and Brian Poole
- Dave Trott – former chairman and Executive Creative Director of The Gate London, copywriter, blogger and author
- Wes Thomas – professional footballer with Oxford United F.C.

== V ==
- Terry Venables – former professional footballer and manager
- Sir Cornelius Vermuyden – 17th-century Dutch drainage engineer; contracted by the Essex Sewer Commissioners to repair breaches in the Thames riverbank at Dagenham

== W ==
- King William I – stayed at Barking Abbey in 1066 and 1067 while the Tower of London was being constructed
- Norma Winstone – jazz singer
- Richard Wisker – actor, singer
- Mary Wollstonecraft – early feminist
- Danny Westwood - former professional footballer

== Z ==
- Bobby Zamora – professional footballer with Brighton & Hove Albion F.C.
