= Climate of the European Union =

European union climates

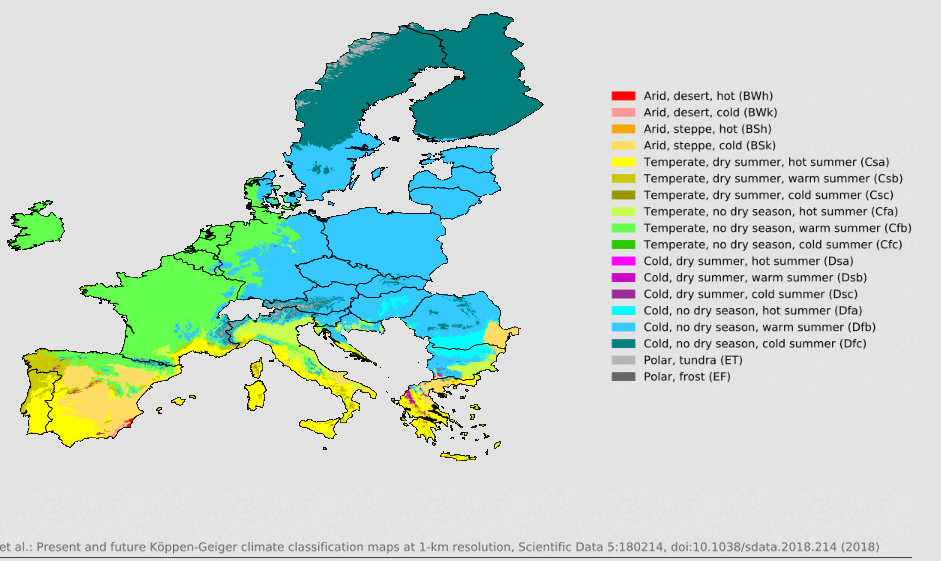
A Köppen-Geiger climate classification map of the European Union

The European Union is generally characterized by a temperate climate. Most of Western Europe has an oceanic climate, in the Köppen climate classification, featuring cool to warm summers and cool winters with frequent overcast skies. Southern Europe has a distinctively Mediterranean climate, which features warm to hot, dry summers and cool to mild winters and frequent sunny skies. Central-eastern Europe is classified as having a humid continental climate, which features warm to hot summers and cold winters.

Parts of the central European plains have a hybrid oceanic/continental climate. Four seasons occur in most of Europe away from the Mediterranean. The coastal lowlands of the Mediterranean Basin have more of a wet winter and dry summer season pattern, the winter season extends from October to February while the summer season is mainly noticeable in the dry months where precipitation can, in some years, become extremely scarce.

== Regional overview ==
=== Southern EU ===
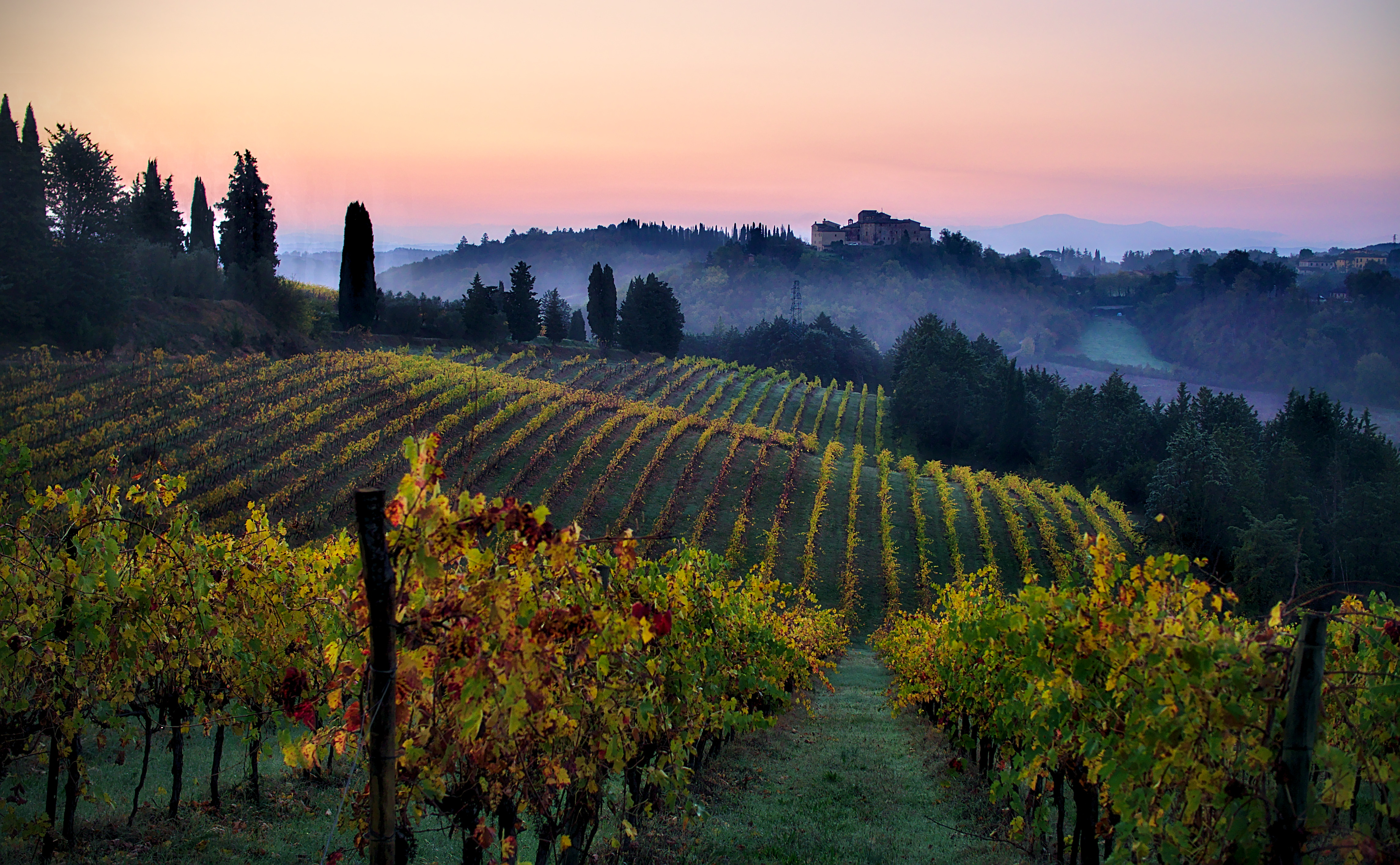
Ponte a Bozzone, Tuscany, Italy

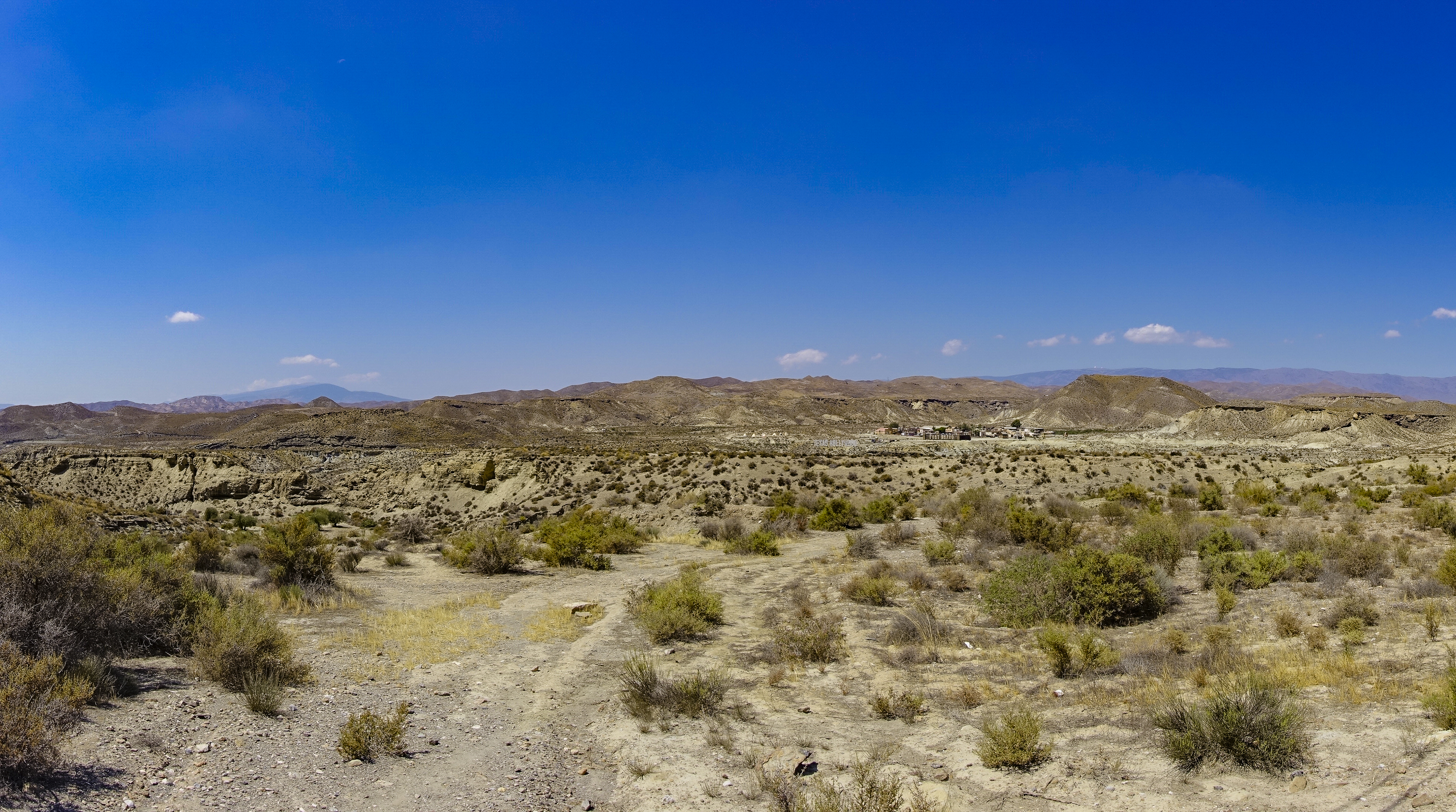
Tabernas Desert in Andalusia, Spain

The southern region of the European Union is mostly impacted by the Mediterranean Sea. Water temperatures there are mild in winter and warm in summer and give name to the Mediterranean climate type due to the majority of precipitation falling in the cooler months. During the summer, the weather is most frequently sunny and dry, and any precipitation falls in the form of showers or thunderstorms from cumuliform clouds. The air is usually hot during the day and pleasantly warm at night. A very small area on the southeastern coast of Spain features the desert climate, making them the only places in Europe that have an arid climate.

=== Western EU ===
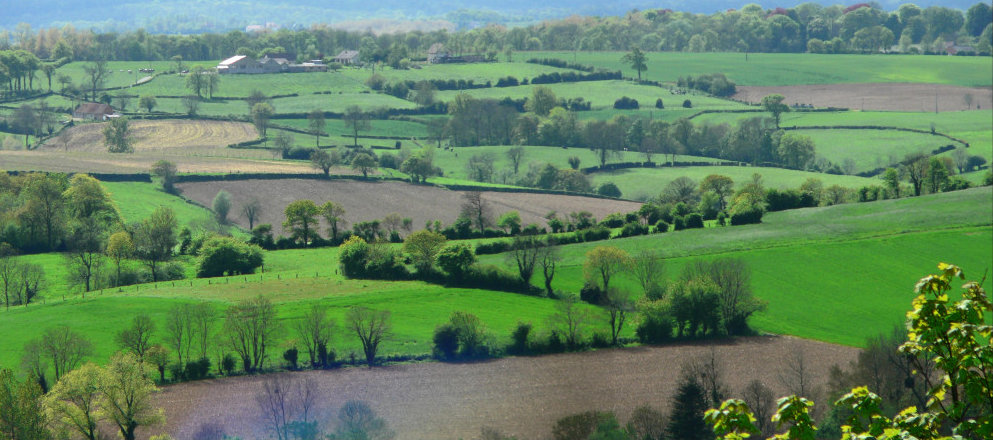
Boulonnais, Boulogne-sur-Mer, France

The western parts of the European Union experiences an oceanic climate, characterized by cool summers and mild winters for their latitude. This results in a relatively narrow annual temperature range and few temperature extremes. Cloudy conditions with frequent precipitation, low hanging clouds, and regular fronts and storms are typical in these regions. Rainfall dominates for the majority of the year, while thunderstorms are infrequent due to the limited convergence of hot and cold air masses caused by rare strong daytime heating. Nevertheless, in most oceanic climate zones, or at least a part of them, there is at least one snowfall per year.

=== Eastern EU ===
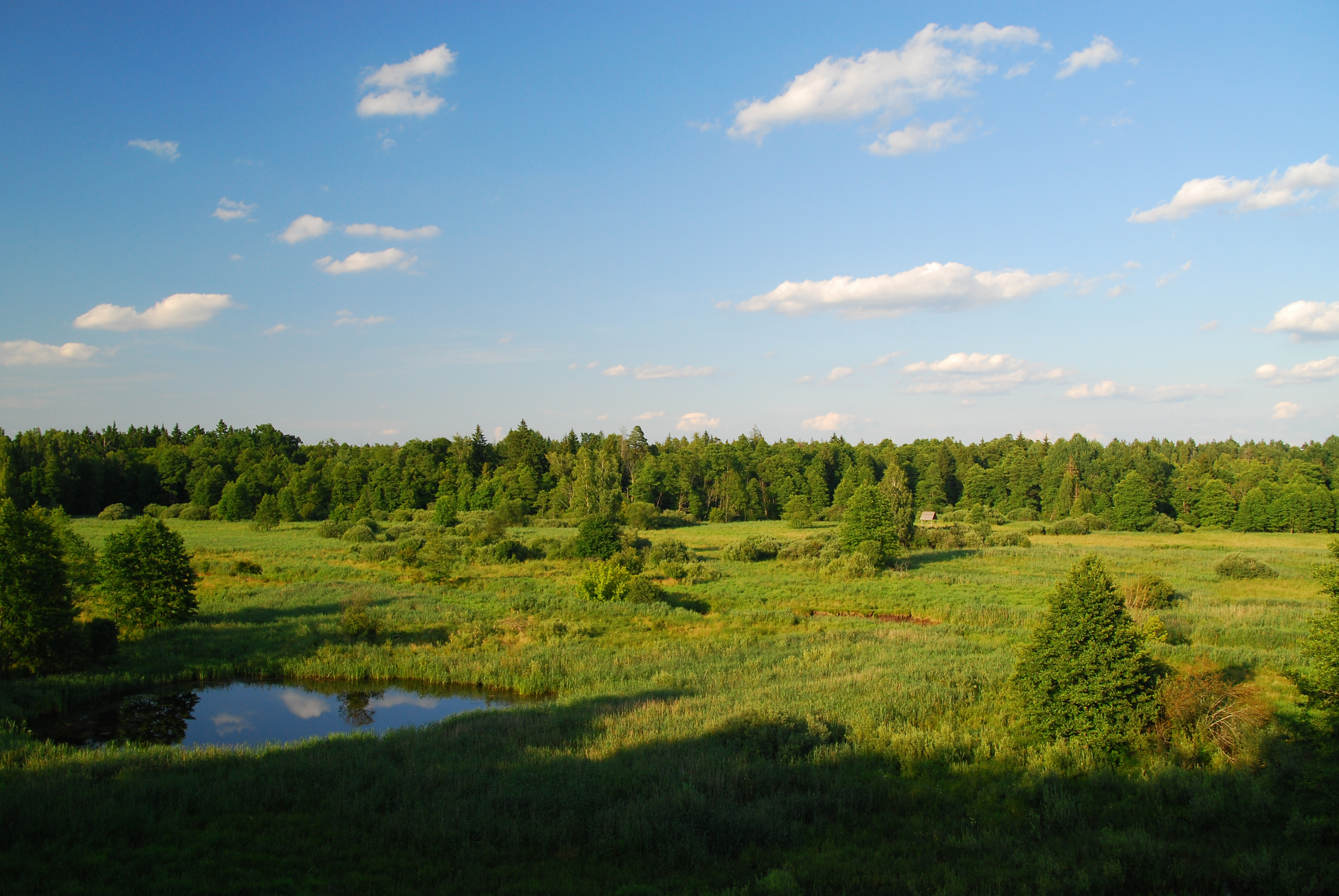
Białowieski National Park in Podlaskie Voivodeship, Poland

The eastern or central regions of the European Union are characterized by a humid continental climate. This climate showcases four distinct seasons with significant seasonal temperature variations. Summers are warm to hot, often accompanied by high humidity levels. Winters tend to hover just below the freezing mark but can get even colder, with some eastern areas experiencing severe cold spells. Precipitation is evenly distributed throughout the year, and humidity remains consistently elevated. Thunderstorms are the primary source of summer rainfall. During the peak of winter, snowfall is common and frequently more prevalent than rain in many areas.

=== Northern EU ===
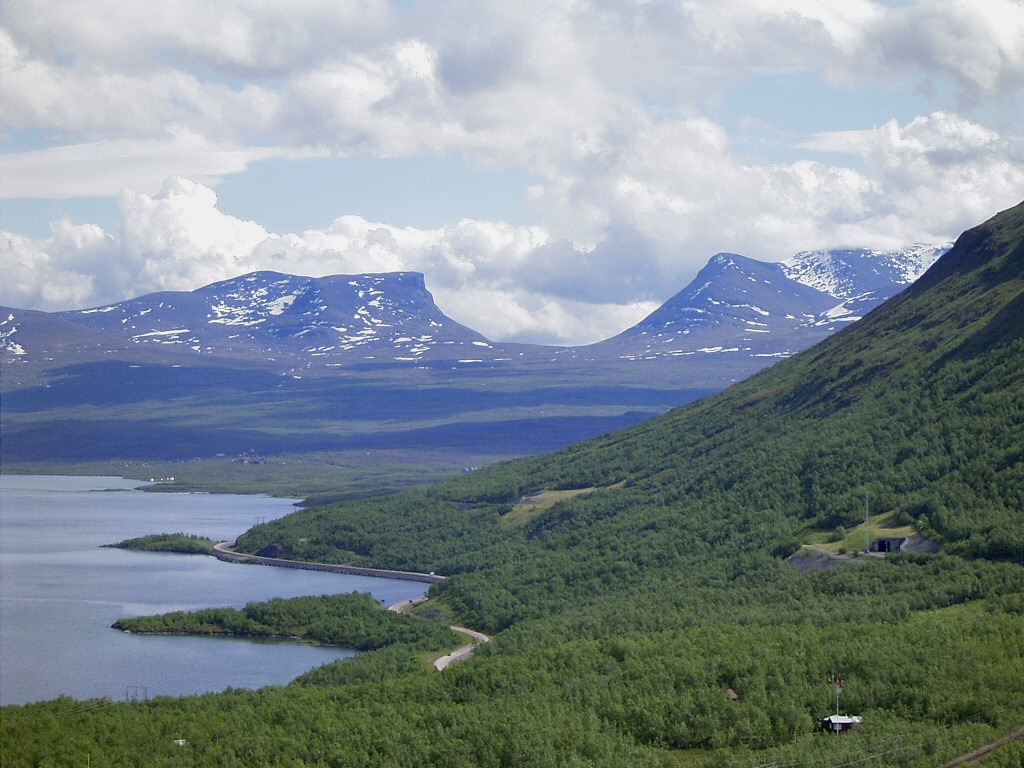
Lapporten in Abisko National Park, Sweden

The Northern countries of the European Union experiences some of the most extreme variations in daylight length on the planet, with the sun never setting for part of each summer and never rising for part of each winter north of the Arctic Circle. This phenomenon is a result of the region's high latitude and axial tilt of the Earth.

The relatively warm climate of Northern Europe, compared to other places at a similar latitude and even somewhat farther south, is primarily influenced by the combination of the Gulf Stream and the general west wind drift caused by the Earth's rotation. This climate characteristic contributes to the region's relatively mild temperatures.

Precipitation and humidity remain high year-round, with the heaviest rainfall usually occurring during the autumn months when the relative warmth of the sea compared to the land is at its greatest.

Winters are long and cold, though still relatively warm compared to Siberia, Canada, or Alaska. The frost-free season is brief, lasting from about 45 to 100 days at most, and freezing temperatures can occur at any time outside the summer months in many areas. Summers are short and range from warm to cool, lasting no more than three months of the year (but at least one month).

=== Outermost Regions ===
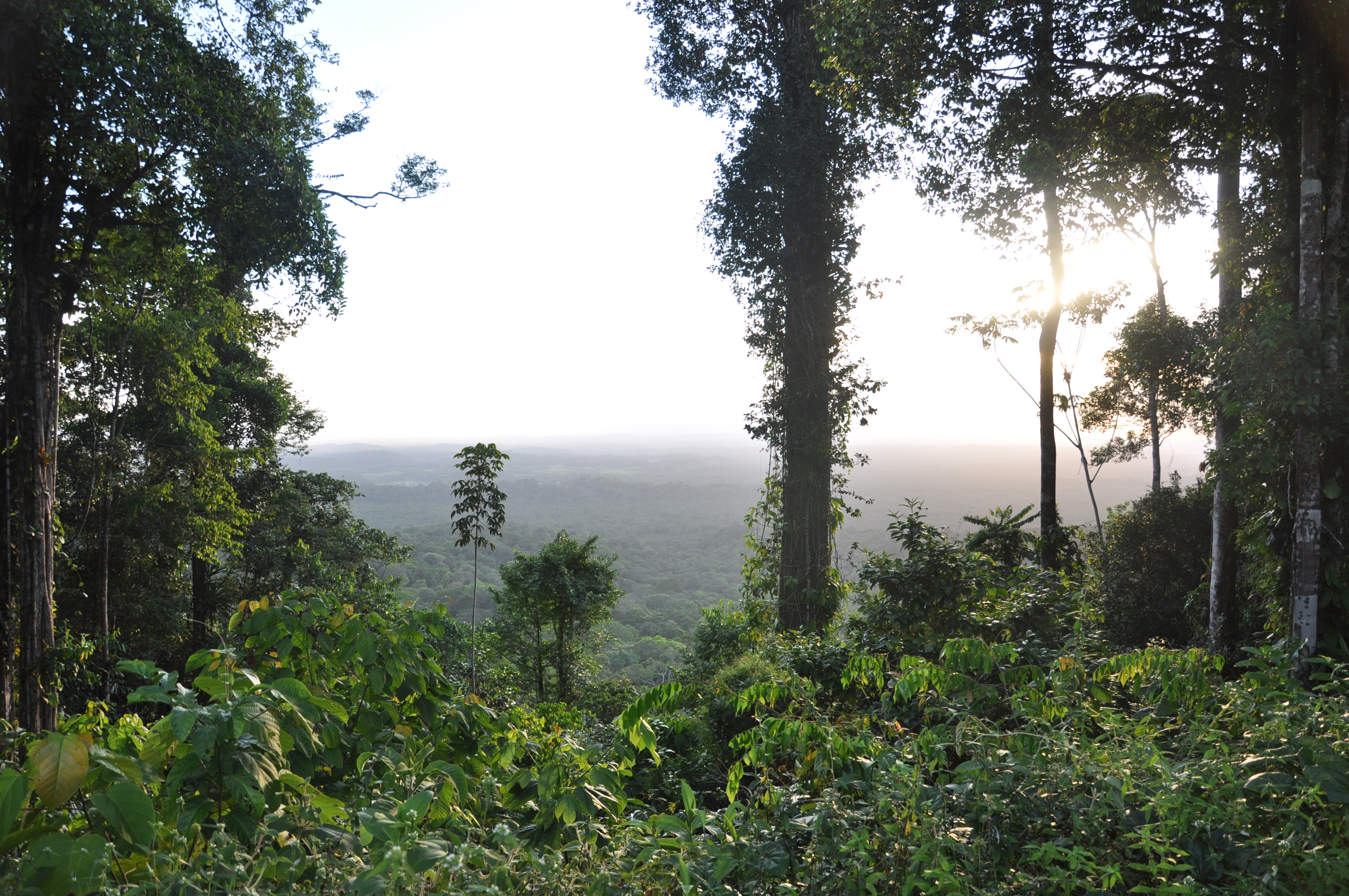
Trésor Regional Nature Reserve in French Guiana, France

The outermost regions of the European Union encompass several climate types which are not to be found on the continent. Tropical rainforest climate and Tropical monsoon climate are found in Guadeloupe, Martinique, and French Guiana. Tropical savanna climate is found in Mayotte and Réunion. In Azores and Madeira predominantes the humid subtropical climate and the Mediterranean climate. The Canary Islands are mostly characterized by having a semi-desert climate and a desert climate.

== Extremes ==
=== Heat ===
On August 11, 2021, the European Union witnessed its highest recorded temperature of 48.8 °C (119.8 °F) in Floridia, situated on the island of Sicily, Italy.

The highest temperature each year during the 21st century recorded in the European Union.

Location	Temperature	Year
Sestu, Sardinia	47.3 °C (117.1 °F)	2023
Pinhão, Região do Norte	47.0 °C (116.6 °F)	2022
Floridia, Sicily	48.8 °C (119.8 °F)	2021
Nicosia, Cyprus	46.2 °C (115.2 °F)	2020
Vérargues, Occitania	46.0 °C (114.8 °F)	2019
Alvega, Região do Centro	46.8 °C (116.2 °F)	2018
La Rambla, Andalusia	47.6 °C (117.7 °F)	2021
Montoro, Andalusia	47.3 °C (117.1 °F)	2017
Montoro, Andalusia	47.4 °C (117.3 °F)	2021
Lousã, Região do Centro	45.0 °C (113.0 °F)	2016
Mengíbar, Andalusia	47.1 °C (116.8 °F)	2012
Cyprus	45.6 °C (114.1 °F)	2010
Aspropyrgos, Athens	47.5 °C (117.5 °F)	2007
Amareleja, Alentejo	47.4 °C (117.3 °F)	2003
Nea Filadelfeia, Athens	47.5 °C (117.5 °F)	2007

=== Cold ===
On January 28, 1999, the town of Pokka in Kittilä, Lapland, Finland, experienced an extreme cold temperature of −51.5 °C (−60.7 °F), marking the coldest on record in the European Union.

The two weather stations in Italy and the one in Germany in the table below. That recorded the lowest temperature during the year. Those are all mountain stations situated thousands of meters or above sea level. All stations in Finland and Sweden are at an elevation substantially below 1000 meter.

Location	Temperature	Year
Naimakka, Norrbotten	−43.8 °C (−46.8 °F)	2021
Kevo, Lapin Maakunta	−41.1 °C (−42.0 °F)	2020
Gielas, Västerbotten	−40.7 °C (−41.3 °F)	2024
Muonio, Lapin Maakunta	−41.7 °C (−43.1 °F)	2017
Naimakka, Norrbotten	−42.9 °C (−45.2 °F)	2016
Nikkaluokta, Norrbotten	−40.2 °C (−40.4 °F)	2015
Karesuando, Norrbotten	−42.7 °C (−44.9 °F)	2014
Pale di San Martino, Trentino	−49.6 °C (−57.3 °F)	2013
Naimakka, Norrbotten	−42.8 °C (−45.0 °F)	2012
Naimakka, Norrbotten	−42.6 °C (−44.7 °F)	2011
Nikkaluokta, Norrbotten	−42.1 °C (−43.8 °F)	2010
Busa delle Sponde Alte, Veneto	−45.5 °C (−49.9 °F)	2009
Vajmat, Norrbotten	−40.7 °C (−41.3 °F)	2007
Kittilä, Lapin Maakunta	−43.6 °C (−46.5 °F)	2006
Kuusamo, North Ostrobothnia	−41.9 °C (−43.4 °F)	2003
Abraure, Norrbotten	−42.4 °C (−44.3 °F)	2002
Funtensee, Bavaria	−45.9 °C (−50.6 °F)	2001

== Natural disasters and effects ==
Cyclone Lothar, stands as the most severe windstorm ever recorded during the 20th century in the European Union.

Its path cut across France, Belgium, Luxembourg, and Germany from December 25 to December 27, 1999. The cyclone brought tragedy, claiming 110 lives (including 88 in France alone) and causing more than €15 billion in damages, earning the unfortunate distinction of being the costliest European windstorm on record.

Remarkably, Cyclone Lothar was the second in a series of devastating European windstorms that struck in December 1999. Approximately three weeks after Cyclone Anatol's destructive impact on Denmark, Sweden, and Germany, Cyclone Lothar unleashed its fury upon the western part of Europe. Following Lothar's passage, yet another intense European windstorm, Cyclone Martin, inflicted severe damage further south along the storm's track. The occurrence of these successive and formidable windstorms brought significant challenges and losses to the affected regions.
