= Blackhall =

Blackhall may refer to:

== Places ==
- Two adjoining villages in County Durham, England:
  - Blackhall Colliery
  - Blackhall Rocks
- Blackhall, Edinburgh, Scotland
- Blackhall Road, Oxford, England
- Blackhall townland, near Clane, County Kildare, Ireland
- Blackhall, a neighbourhood of Paisley, Renfrewshire, Scotland

== People ==
- Barony of Blackhall, Scottish feudal barony which originally covered the area of Renfrewshire and a part of Ayrshire
- David Scott Blackhall (1910–1981), English radio personality, author, and poet
- Gilbert Blackhall (died 1671), Scottish Catholic missionary priest
- Mark Blackhall (born 1960), English former footballer
- Sheena Blackhall (born 1947), Scottish writer, illustrator, and singer

== Other ==
- Blackhall Gaels GAA, a Gaelic Athletic Association club in Ireland

== See also ==
- Blackhall Manor, house near Paisley in Renfrewshire, Scotland
- Black Hall, listed building in Devon, England
