= Mark McLeod =

Mark McLeod may refer to:

- Mark McLeod (Australian footballer), Australian rules footballer
- Mark McLeod (English footballer), English football midfielder
