= 2010 Swedish cold waves =

Winter cold waves in Sweden

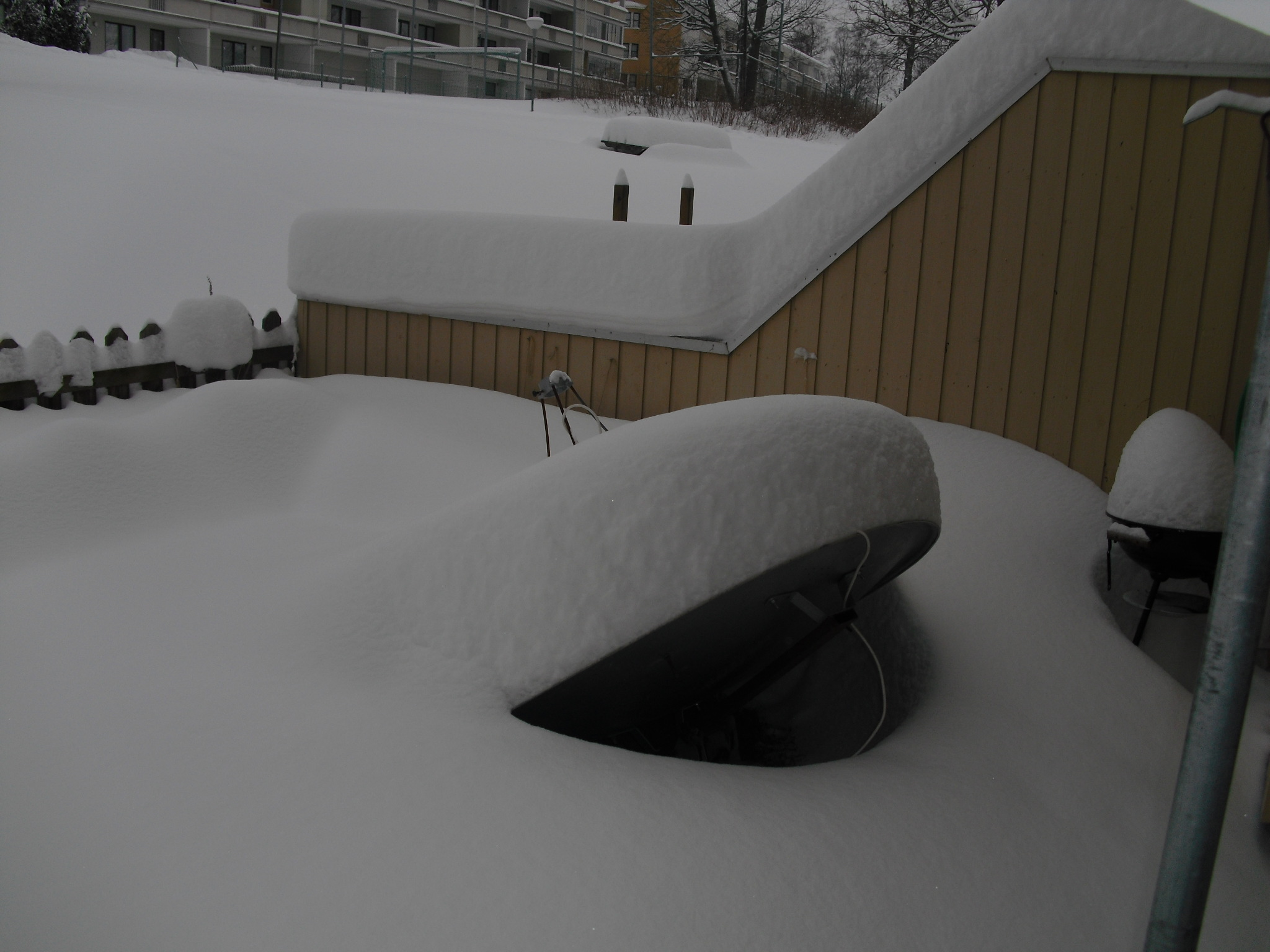
Heavy snowfall in Jönköping, February 2010

Sweden had a very unusual start and finish to the year 2010, with two consecutive winter cold waves occurring in a single calendar year. Since both events were notable, both are covered in this article.

== January–February 2010 cold wave ==
=== January ===
January was in the southern part of the country the coldest for 23 years, the deep freeze of 1987. Some cold weather had finished 2009 and was followed with solid freezing temperatures during the first week of January. The December means were not by any means extreme, but the cold would gradually build up. The intense cold set in between 7 January and 15 January, with Horn as far south as in northern Götaland recording an overnight low of −31.6 °C (−24.9 °F) and Hemavan in the north of the country recording −40.8 °C (−41.4 °F). Relatively less extreme temperatures would follow during the second half of the month, until the final days of January saw another cold snap after some heavy snowfall on 27–28 January. During the final three days of the month low temperatures fell below −20 °C (−4 °F) in most areas far south in the country. Linköping recorded −28.9 °C (−20.0 °F), which was the coldest temperature recorded on this location since the record-breaking 1942 cold wave. The end result of January was that capital Stockholm that is inside an urban heat island did not record a single temperature above 0.0 °C (32.0 °F) all month. In Örebro the maximum temperature recorded was −0.6 °C (30.9 °F) and in Västerås −1 °C (30 °F), which is very rare for an area so far south in Sweden. Remarkably, the far north of the country saw less severe January temperatures than during the 1961-1990 reference period.

=== February ===
February was colder than usual, although not matching the January extremes in the southerly parts of the country. The cold was shifted further north, with Nikkaluokta above the polar circle having a monthly mean of −19.9 °C (−3.8 °F) and an average low of −27.3 °C (−17.1 °F). With means below Dalälven (the boundary between Svealand and Norrland) being between −2 °C (28 °F) and −7 °C (19 °F) in most cases the heavy snowfall was a larger issue. Westerlies mixed with the colder than usual air made snowfall abundant during the low-pressure systems' resurgence on the west coast. Although no February precipitation records were broken, an unusual amount of what fell came as snow in the southerly part of the country, where winter highs normally are above freezing. The frequent snowfall caused havoc for rail transport, with severe delays and cancellations of many lines. The night of 22 February was among the coldest of the entire cold wave, with Stockholm recording −21.0 °C (−5.8 °F) inside the urban heat island and −27.5 °C (−17.5 °F) being measured in Örebro. 24 February saw the coldest temperature of the winter being recorded in Naimakka in the far north with −42 °C (−44 °F).

== March–October ==
From March onwards the temperatures slowly returned to normal. March is a winter month in the northern parts of the country, but apart from a −33.3 °C (−27.9 °F) reading in Pajala in the far north, no particular extremes were being seen. Sweden was affected less by the intense 2010 Northern Hemisphere summer heat waves than Russia, Finland or Germany were, although some hot temperatures were recorded and Lund had a July mean of 20.9 °C (69.6 °F) and Stockholm had one of the hottest months in the country's history with 21.2 °C (70.2 °F). Unlike many other heat waves, the effects were rather local and did not affect the whole country. Such were the swings that Stockholm's 2010 values were in some ways comparable to inland areas in southern Ontario in Canada, known for its very continental climates. The summer peaked with a 34.4 °C (93.9 °F) reading in Målilla on 11 July. Afterwards, August and September cooled down fairly rapidly, but with October being unusually cold.

== November–December cold wave ==
=== November ===
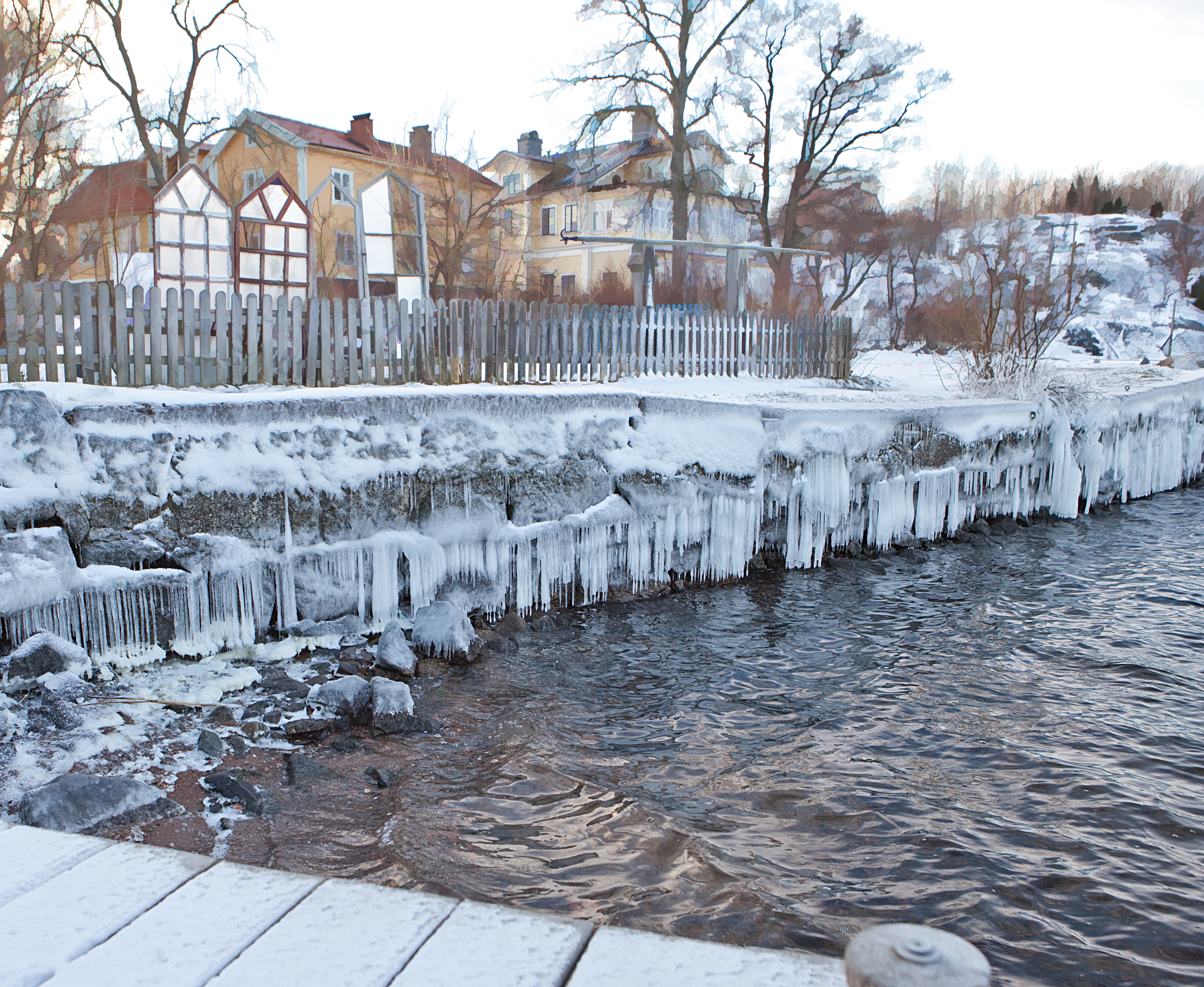
The waterfront in Vaxholm, November 2010

November 2010 was described as King Bore (very cold winter) moved south by SMHI, with tendencies of winter even in the deep south. The nature of November in the south is low diurnal temperature variation and lack of extreme cold, but significant snowfall occurred on several occasions quite far south in the country, and Jönköping, Linköping, Uppsala and Örebro all recorded daily means below freezing. All of those cities are located inland, and in coastal locations means were above the freezing point, albeit not by much. Stockholm and Gothenburg both recorded 7 days with highs below freezing, something that is highly unusual for the country's big cities in November. Even more remarkable were the five ice days measured in Malmö, with southern Scania often averaging means above freezing even in January. In the north of the country the cold was rather intense even by winter standards. Out of SMHI's 100 selected monthly stations, the −16.2 °C (2.8 °F) mean of Nikkaluokta was the lowest ever recorded for the month, and lower than its January normals. Nikkaluokta also saw a −36.6 °C (−33.9 °F) reading on 24 November, which was the lowest in the country for the month. This, unlike the averages was not a national record. Pajala and Arjeplog were also notably new record lows for November. No such records were broken south or east of the mountain ranges and the surrounding highland forests, where Ulvsjö in Bräcke Municipality in Jämtland saw a new record cold November with a −8.4 °C (16.9 °F) mean.

=== December ===
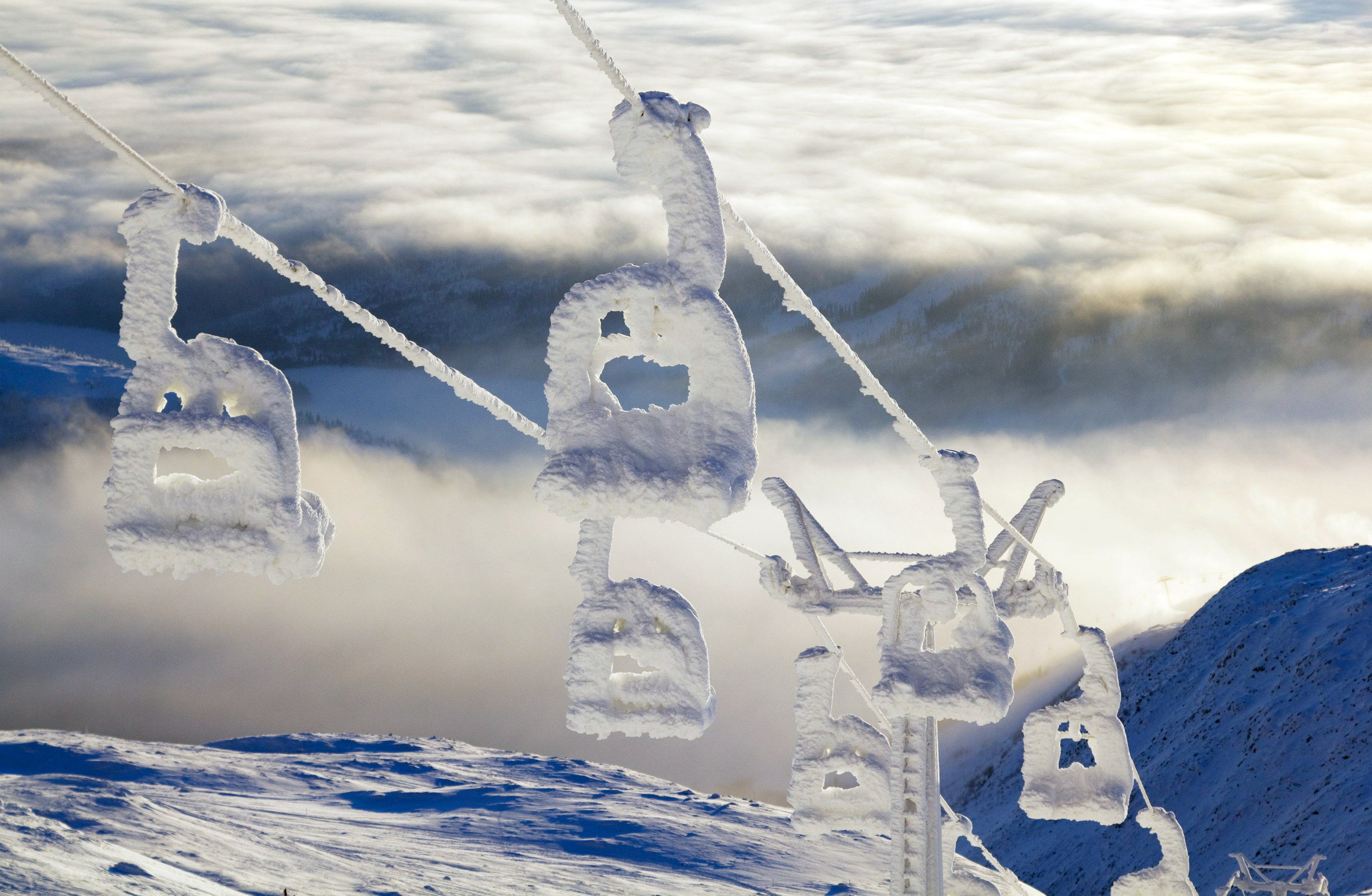
A ski slope in Åreskutan, central Sweden, with the chairlifts completely covered in snow in December 2010

The most extreme cold of the year relative to the normals came in December. Although January 2010 had been slightly colder than what was recorded in the south of the country, December is normally a month that is above freezing during daytime in southern Sweden due to its seasonal lag that a maritime climate brings. Although the month started out quite mild, temperatures plummeted to extreme cold as winter solstice and Christmas neared. Most of the month was solidly below freezing in the entire country, with a few bursts of mild air affecting the deep south. The cold just before Christmas was unprecedented this time of the year in many southern locations. Kalmar saw a record cold −25.6 °C (−14.1 °F) value, Kristianstad another record −24.6 °C (−12.3 °F) value, with Örebro nearly beating its December all-time record cold with −26.6 °C (−15.9 °F), the coldest value for 124 years. During Christmas, the most extreme cold had swept north, with several coastal cities of Norrland recording temperatures around −30 °C (−22 °F). This, albeit highly unusual, did not break any December records. Temperatures throughout the months in the northern parts of the country were quite far below normals, resulting in the cold wave being felt in the entire country. In the south, the New Year's Eve brought milder air, bringing temperatures just above freezing for that night. This marked the end of the cold wave in the south, with January 2011 being a normal winter month. The cold returned to normal levels further north as well, although winter temperatures there are more extreme than a cold wave in the south regardless. The coldest temperature of the month and year was recorded in Nikkaluokta on 20 December, with −42.1 °C (−43.8 °F).

The fallout of December were a lot of new all-time low monthly mean temperatures in southern Sweden. The most extreme new record was set in Arvika, Värmland, with a monthly mean of −14.6 °C (5.7 °F) and a low of −20.2 °C (−4.4 °F). This was more than three degrees colder than the previous December record for the site and less than half a degree below the deep freeze of January 1987, in all possibly the coldest December month there since 1788. Among other new December record cold months were found in Örebro, Norrköping, Linköping, Gothenburg, Malmö, Kalmar, Växjö, Kristianstad, Halmstad, Varberg, Borås, Vänersborg, Helsingborg, Ljungby, Visby and many maritime coastal stations such as Falsterbo, Landsort and the extreme points of Öland. The −5.3 °C (22.5 °F) reading of Helsingborg was also almost three degrees colder than the previous record.

== The full year ==
The summer heat wave prevented all-time yearly cold records throughout the country in spite of the two cold waves. The nearest to a new all-time cold record was in Ljungby, which measured 5 °C (41 °F) as opposed to the 4.9 °C (40.8 °F) record of 1987. Although the year was colder than normal throughout the country, it takes a cool summer for those records to be broken, as were in 1942, 1985 and 1987. In spite of this, it is extremely rare for inland locations in Götaland in the south to record yearly means below 5 °C (41 °F), as was done at some stations such as Jönköping, Vänersborg and Ulricehamn. The same was recorded in Örebro and Västerås further north, climates that most often are as mild as further south.

The year 2010 was a blip in a warming tendency of Swedish winters, the following winters were often delayed by mild autumns, and brief in nature with mild Februarys.

== Regions ==
Norrköping had a record cold December, with a new all-time low for the month being set on 23 December with −24.7 °C (−12.5 °F). Also during the January cold wave, Norrköping did not go above freezing all month. In total, Norrköping had 158 frost days during the year.

Climate data for Norrköping (2010 values only)
Month	Jan	Feb	Mar	Apr	May	Jun	Jul	Aug	Sep	Oct	Nov	Dec	Year
Mean daily maximum °C (°F)	−5.1 (22.8)	−2.7 (27.1)	3.5 (38.3)	11.4 (52.5)	15.6 (60.1)	20.8 (69.4)	25.4 (77.7)	20.8 (69.4)	15.7 (60.3)	9.2 (48.6)	2.2 (36.0)	−4.8 (23.4)	9.3 (48.7)
Mean daily minimum °C (°F)	−11.4 (11.5)	−9.1 (15.6)	−4.1 (24.6)	1.2 (34.2)	6.1 (43.0)	9.5 (49.1)	14.9 (58.8)	13.4 (56.1)	8.2 (46.8)	2.6 (36.7)	−2.0 (28.4)	−11.7 (10.9)	1.4 (34.5)
Average precipitation mm (inches)	41 (1.6)	59 (2.3)	21 (0.8)	22 (0.9)	67 (2.6)	32 (1.3)	82 (3.2)	95 (3.7)	41 (1.6)	57 (2.2)	93 (3.7)	41 (1.6)	651 (25.6)
Mean monthly sunshine hours	36	30	161	191	215	298	285	150	150	118	53	37	1,724
Source: SMHI Monthly Data 2002-2015

Climate data for Norrköping (2002-2015 temperatures; 1961-1990 precipitation & sunshine)
Month	Jan	Feb	Mar	Apr	May	Jun	Jul	Aug	Sep	Oct	Nov	Dec	Year
Mean daily maximum °C (°F)	0.8 (33.4)	1.2 (34.2)	5.6 (42.1)	12.0 (53.6)	16.7 (62.1)	20.4 (68.7)	23.1 (73.6)	21.8 (71.2)	17.5 (63.5)	10.7 (51.3)	5.8 (42.4)	2.5 (36.5)	11.5 (52.7)
Mean daily minimum °C (°F)	−4.3 (24.3)	−4.4 (24.1)	−2.5 (27.5)	1.4 (34.5)	6.1 (43.0)	10.0 (50.0)	13.3 (55.9)	12.4 (54.3)	8.6 (47.5)	3.8 (38.8)	1.1 (34.0)	−2.3 (27.9)	3.7 (38.7)
Average precipitation mm (inches)	31.7 (1.25)	23.1 (0.91)	27.3 (1.07)	29.7 (1.17)	36.4 (1.43)	49.7 (1.96)	61.9 (2.44)	59.0 (2.32)	55.3 (2.18)	47.3 (1.86)	47.7 (1.88)	38.9 (1.53)	508.2 (20.01)
Mean monthly sunshine hours	40	70	100	175	259	277	253	222	149	96	57	36	1,734
Source 1: SMHI
Source 2: SMHI Monthly Data 2002-2015

=== Svealand ===
Stockholm did not set any cold records, but still had a colder year than usual, with the entire January month being below freezing. 136 air frosts were recorded throughout the year. In addition, Stockholm also had a very hot July, being most affected by the 2010 Northern Hemisphere summer heat waves than any other Swedish location. This moderated the yearly average, along with the urban heat island that always render milder overnight lows than in the rural Mälar valley.

Climate data for Stockholm (2010 values only)
Month	Jan	Feb	Mar	Apr	May	Jun	Jul	Aug	Sep	Oct	Nov	Dec	Year
Mean daily maximum °C (°F)	−4.8 (23.4)	−3.0 (26.6)	3.0 (37.4)	10.8 (51.4)	16.4 (61.5)	21.2 (70.2)	26.5 (79.7)	21.3 (70.3)	15.5 (59.9)	8.8 (47.8)	2.2 (36.0)	−4.2 (24.4)	9.4 (48.9)
Mean daily minimum °C (°F)	−9 (16)	−7.7 (18.1)	−3.1 (26.4)	2.5 (36.5)	7.3 (45.1)	11.1 (52.0)	17.2 (63.0)	14.1 (57.4)	9.3 (48.7)	4.2 (39.6)	−1.5 (29.3)	−9.3 (15.3)	2.9 (37.2)
Average precipitation mm (inches)	26 (1.0)	29 (1.1)	22 (0.9)	23 (0.9)	31 (1.2)	33 (1.3)	74 (2.9)	105 (4.1)	73 (2.9)	34 (1.3)	54 (2.1)	45 (1.8)	549 (21.6)
Mean monthly sunshine hours	38	37	165	201	247	326	302	172	162	130	54	30	1,864
Source: SMHI average data 2002-2015

Climate data for Stockholm, temperature 2002-2015; precipitation and sunshine 1961-1990
Month	Jan	Feb	Mar	Apr	May	Jun	Jul	Aug	Sep	Oct	Nov	Dec	Year
Mean daily maximum °C (°F)	0.5 (32.9)	0.8 (33.4)	4.7 (40.5)	11.3 (52.3)	16.6 (61.9)	20.7 (69.3)	23.8 (74.8)	22.2 (72.0)	16.9 (62.4)	10.1 (50.2)	5.7 (42.3)	2.4 (36.3)	11.2 (52.2)
Mean daily minimum °C (°F)	−3.1 (26.4)	−3.3 (26.1)	−1.2 (29.8)	2.8 (37.0)	7.4 (45.3)	11.4 (52.5)	15.1 (59.2)	14.3 (57.7)	10.2 (50.4)	5.2 (41.4)	2.0 (35.6)	−1.2 (29.8)	4.9 (40.8)
Average precipitation mm (inches)	39 (1.5)	27 (1.1)	29 (1.1)	29 (1.1)	32 (1.3)	55 (2.2)	65 (2.6)	59 (2.3)	52 (2.0)	49 (1.9)	47 (1.9)	45 (1.8)	531 (20.9)
Mean monthly sunshine hours	40	72	135	185	276	292	260	221	154	99	54	33	1,821
Source 1: SMHI average data 2002-2015
Source 2: SMHI

Örebro had a record cold December, and the coldest temperature for decades set in January with −28.3 °C (−18.9 °F). Considering the airport's rural setting farther from Lake Hjälmaren at a slightly higher elevation, temperature extremes in the city proper may have been slightly less severe, although these differences would be marginal. In total, Örebro recorded 171 air frosts in 2010.

Climate data for Örebro Airport (2010 values only)
Month	Jan	Feb	Mar	Apr	May	Jun	Jul	Aug	Sep	Oct	Nov	Dec	Year
Mean daily maximum °C (°F)	−6.5 (20.3)	−3.5 (25.7)	2.8 (37.0)	11.5 (52.7)	16.5 (61.7)	21.0 (69.8)	24.6 (76.3)	20.7 (69.3)	15.9 (60.6)	9.5 (49.1)	1.2 (34.2)	−5.6 (21.9)	9.0 (48.2)
Mean daily minimum °C (°F)	−13.6 (7.5)	−10.5 (13.1)	−4.8 (23.4)	1.1 (34.0)	5.7 (42.3)	8.9 (48.0)	13.8 (56.8)	12.8 (55.0)	6.5 (43.7)	2.0 (35.6)	−3.4 (25.9)	−13.7 (7.3)	0.4 (32.7)
Average precipitation mm (inches)	31 (1.2)	82 (3.2)	25 (1.0)	22 (0.9)	115 (4.5)	25 (1.0)	166 (6.5)	83 (3.3)	42 (1.7)	30 (1.2)	88 (3.5)	31 (1.2)	740 (29.1)
Source: SMHI average data 2002-2015

Climate data for Örebro Airport (2002-2015 temperatures and 1961-1990 precipitation normals)
Month	Jan	Feb	Mar	Apr	May	Jun	Jul	Aug	Sep	Oct	Nov	Dec	Year
Mean daily maximum °C (°F)	0.3 (32.5)	0.7 (33.3)	5.4 (41.7)	12.1 (53.8)	16.9 (62.4)	20.6 (69.1)	23.1 (73.6)	21.8 (71.2)	17.2 (63.0)	10.3 (50.5)	5.3 (41.5)	1.9 (35.4)	11.3 (52.3)
Mean daily minimum °C (°F)	−5.6 (21.9)	−5.4 (22.3)	−3.2 (26.2)	1.0 (33.8)	5.7 (42.3)	9.4 (48.9)	12.5 (54.5)	11.2 (52.2)	7.3 (45.1)	2.7 (36.9)	0.5 (32.9)	−3.6 (25.5)	2.7 (36.9)
Average precipitation mm (inches)	48.4 (1.91)	34.9 (1.37)	35.8 (1.41)	40.1 (1.58)	43.7 (1.72)	55.5 (2.19)	76.2 (3.00)	74.3 (2.93)	74.5 (2.93)	62.3 (2.45)	65.6 (2.58)	50.1 (1.97)	661.4 (26.04)
Source 1: SMHI Precipitation normals 1961-1990
Source 2: SMHI average data 2002-2015

=== Southern Norrland ===
Hudiksvall that normally has a very mild climate considering its northerly latitude saw one of its coldest years on record. Hudiksvall was the northernmost part of the country that saw a record cold December, although nearby Delsbo had seen a much colder value 17 years before Hudiksvall's weather station opened in 1932. Both cold waves also saw high snowfall. In total Hudiksvall had 179 frost days during 2010.

Climate data for Hudiksvall (2010 values only)
Month	Jan	Feb	Mar	Apr	May	Jun	Jul	Aug	Sep	Oct	Nov	Dec	Year
Mean daily maximum °C (°F)	−6.4 (20.5)	−4.7 (23.5)	2.7 (36.9)	9.2 (48.6)	15.0 (59.0)	18.6 (65.5)	24.2 (75.6)	19.6 (67.3)	15.8 (60.4)	9.4 (48.9)	0.0 (32.0)	−6.2 (20.8)	8.1 (46.6)
Mean daily minimum °C (°F)	−12.7 (9.1)	−14.0 (6.8)	−5.0 (23.0)	−0.6 (30.9)	4.6 (40.3)	7.5 (45.5)	13.7 (56.7)	11.4 (52.5)	5.6 (42.1)	1.0 (33.8)	−6.1 (21.0)	−14.0 (6.8)	−0.7 (30.7)
Average precipitation mm (inches)	49 (1.9)	82 (3.2)	14 (0.6)	18 (0.7)	42 (1.7)	152 (6.0)	42 (1.7)	106 (4.2)	39 (1.5)	16 (0.6)	68 (2.7)	122 (4.8)	750 (29.5)
Source: SMHI climate data 2002-2015

Climate data for Hudiksvall (2002-2015 temperatures; 1961-1990 precipitation)
Month	Jan	Feb	Mar	Apr	May	Jun	Jul	Aug	Sep	Oct	Nov	Dec	Year
Mean daily maximum °C (°F)	−0.8 (30.6)	0.2 (32.4)	4.9 (40.8)	10.4 (50.7)	14.9 (58.8)	19.2 (66.6)	22.5 (72.5)	21.1 (70.0)	16.7 (62.1)	9.6 (49.3)	4.0 (39.2)	0.7 (33.3)	10.2 (50.4)
Mean daily minimum °C (°F)	−7.5 (18.5)	−7.3 (18.9)	−4.3 (24.3)	−0.4 (31.3)	4.2 (39.6)	8.4 (47.1)	12.2 (54.0)	11.0 (51.8)	6.5 (43.7)	1.5 (34.7)	−1.7 (28.9)	−5.7 (21.7)	1.4 (34.5)
Average precipitation mm (inches)	50.2 (1.98)	36.8 (1.45)	38.9 (1.53)	38.4 (1.51)	38.4 (1.51)	49.0 (1.93)	63.2 (2.49)	72.7 (2.86)	69.8 (2.75)	58.6 (2.31)	63.1 (2.48)	54.9 (2.16)	635.9 (25.04)
Source 1: SMHI precipitation average 1961-1990
Source 2: SMHI climate data 2002-2015
