= Alby, Ånge =

Alby
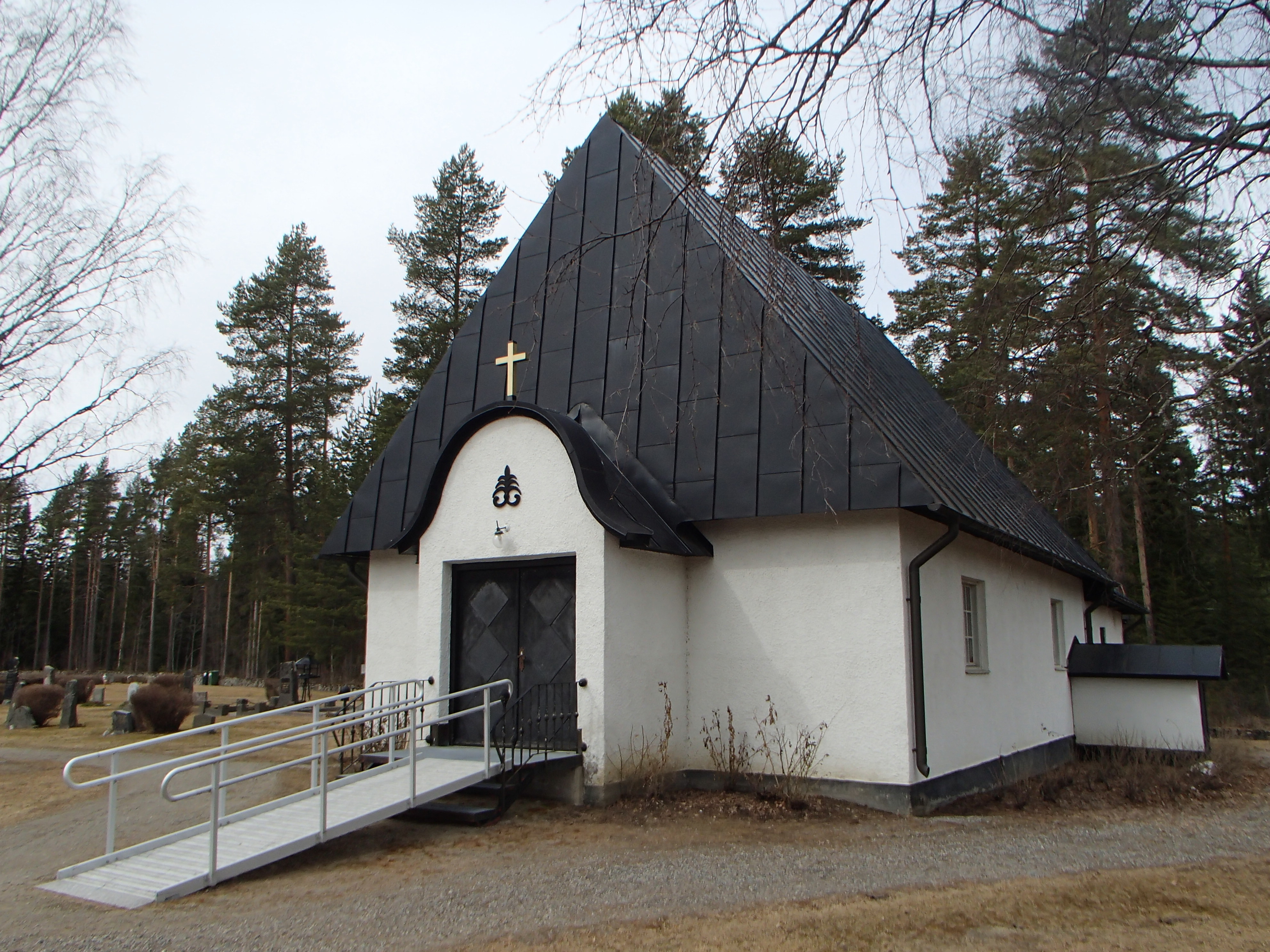
- Alby church

- Location within Västernorrland Location within Sweden
- Coordinates: 62°29′35″N 15°28′40″E
- Country: Sweden
- Province: Medelpad
- County: Västernorrland County
- Municipality: Ånge Municipality

Area
  - Total: 1.24 km^{2} (0.48 sq mi)

Population (31 December 2010)
  - Total: 367
  - Density: 297/km^{2} (770/sq mi)
- Time zone: UTC+1 (CET)
  - Summer (DST): UTC+2 (CEST)

Alby (Swedish pronunciation: [ˈɑ̌ːlbʏ]) is a locality situated in Ånge Municipality, Västernorrland County, Sweden with 367 inhabitants in 2010.
