= Woodham Academy =

Location
- Washington Crescent; Newton Aycliffe, County Durham, DL5 4AX; England; 54°38′N 1°34′W

Information
- Other name: Woodham
- Former names: Woodham Community Technology College (1999–2012); Woodham Comprehensive School (1970–1999)
- Type: Academy
- Motto: Achievement for All
- Established: 29 June 1970
- Local authority: Durham County Council
- Trust: Eden Learning Trust
- Department for Education URN: 138717 Tables
- Ofsted: Reports
- Head teacher: Andrew Bell
- Gender: Mixed
- Age range: 11–16
- Enrolment: 1038 (2024)
- Capacity: 1,100
- Colours: Black, grey, gold, green
- Rival: Greenfield Academy
- Website: www.woodham.org.uk

Woodham Academy (simply referred to as Woodham, formerly Woodham Community Technology College and Woodham Comprehensive School) is an 11–16 mixed secondary school with academy status in Newton Aycliffe, County Durham, England. Established in 1970 as a foundation school, it adopted its present name after becoming an academy in 2012. It is part of the Eden Learning Trust.

== History ==
=== Woodham Comprehensive School: 1970 to 1999 ===
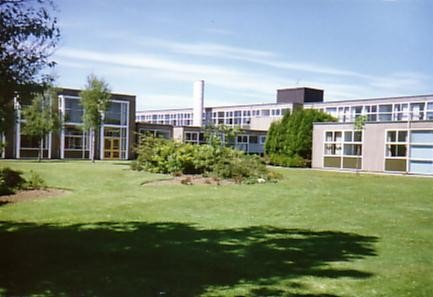
Woodham Community Technology College

Woodham Comprehensive was a foundation school that opened on 29 June 1970 by Alice Bacon, Baroness Bacon, a former Labour MP. It was built under the Consortium of Local Authorities Special Programme.

As well as Woodham and Greenfield schools there was a third secondary school in Newton Aycliffe called "The Avenue Comprehensive" which was closed in 1992 and amalgamated with Woodham. It was created from two former secondary schools; Marlowe Hall Secondary Modern School and Milton Hall.

On 4 July 1990, the school was set alight by arsonists. Around a third of the school's teaching area was destroyed and an estimated £1 million of damage was caused. The damaged section of the school was rebuilt and reopened on 12 December 1992.

=== Woodham Community Technology College: 1999 to 2012 ===
Woodham gained Technology College status in 1999 and was opened by Kate Adie.

In March 2008, Woodham Community Technology College (often written as Woodham CTC) announced the closure of its sixth form provision due to low applications but remained committed to current sixth form students.

The Woodham Warriors were the school's American flag football team from 2003 to around 2014 and won many tournaments and accolades, including representing the UK in 2005.

=== School rebuild ===
The school was scheduled for a complete rebuild but the government axed the Building Schools for the Future rebuilding programme in 2010.

=== Woodham Academy: September 2012 to present ===
In March 2012, the school announced it would be submitting a request to turn the school into an academy. In July 2012, it opened its sports academy.

In July 2021 it was announced that Woodham was amongst 50 schools nationally to be considered for a major rebuild, partial rebuild or refurbishment under the School Rebuilding Programme with the Government's decision expected in 2022. Woodham Academy's new building officially opened to students on Monday 9 September 2024, marking the beginning of the 2024-25 academic year.

== Facilities ==
The school's facilities include

- 9 science laboratories
- 2 music suites
- a technology complex with 6 specialist workshops
- a textiles studio
- a sports hall
- a gymnasium
- a drama studio
- a swimming pool
- multiple IT suites

== Ofsted judgements ==
- 2006 - Satisfactory
- 2009 - Satisfactory
- 2011 - Good
- 2016 - Requires Improvement
- 2018 - Good
- 2023 - Good

== Head teachers ==
Head teachers of the school are:^{b}

- John Pearson (OBE), 1970–1980
- Katherine Carr, 1980–1990
- Andrew Bennett, 1990–1994
- Steven Harness, 1994–2010
- Christine Forsyth, 2010–2019
- Andrew Bell, 2019–2025
- Micheal Carrick, 2026–present

== Notable alumni ==
- Kate Avery, long-distance runner
- Darren Craddock, footballer
- Mark Gatiss, actor, comedian, screenwriter and novelist
- Paul Magrs, writer and lecturer
- Scott Mann, film director
- Chris Mason, footballer
- Jason Steele, footballer
- Alan Strickland, politician
- Ross Turnbull, footballer
- Lewis Wing, footballer
- Angela Winstanley-Smith, water polo player

== Gallery ==
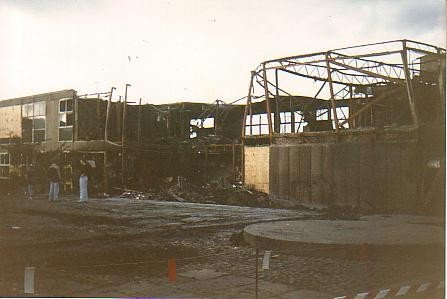
Fire damage in The Auckland Sector of the school

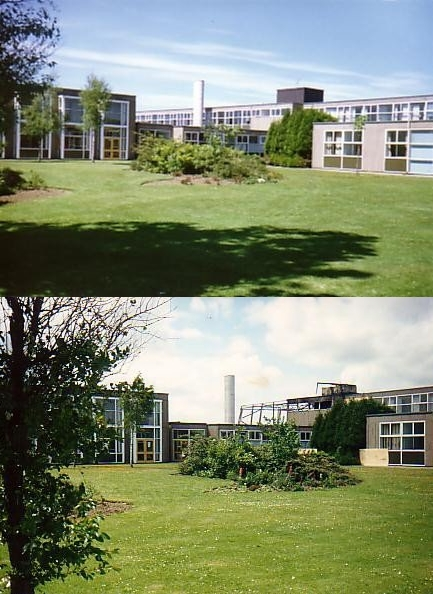
Before and after the fire

== Notes ==
1. Position name changed to "Principal" in 2010.
