= Ljungaverk =

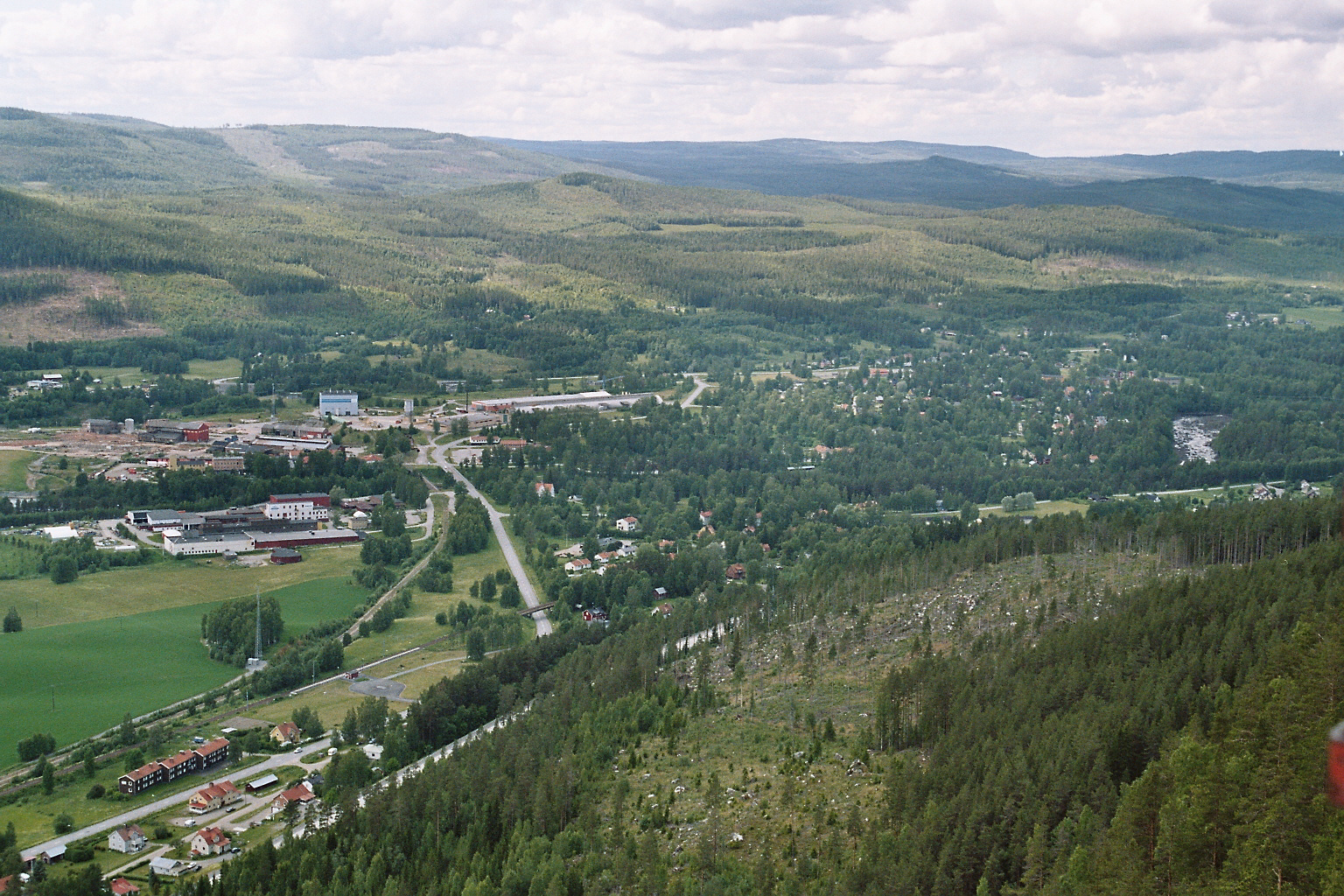
- Ljungaverk

- Location within Västernorrland Location within Sweden
- Coordinates: 62°29′N 16°01′E
- Country: Sweden
- Province: Medelpad
- County: Västernorrland County
- Municipality: Ånge Municipality

Area
  - Total: 2.83 km^{2} (1.09 sq mi)

Population (31 December 2010)
  - Total: 885
  - Density: 313/km^{2} (810/sq mi)
- Time zone: UTC+1 (CET)
  - Summer (DST): UTC+2 (CEST)

Ljungaverk is a locality situated in Ånge Municipality, Västernorrland County, Sweden with 885 inhabitants in 2010.

During World War II, the company Fosfatbolaget produced in secrecy heavy water, which was delivered to both Nazi Germany and the Manhattan project.
