= Ultuna =

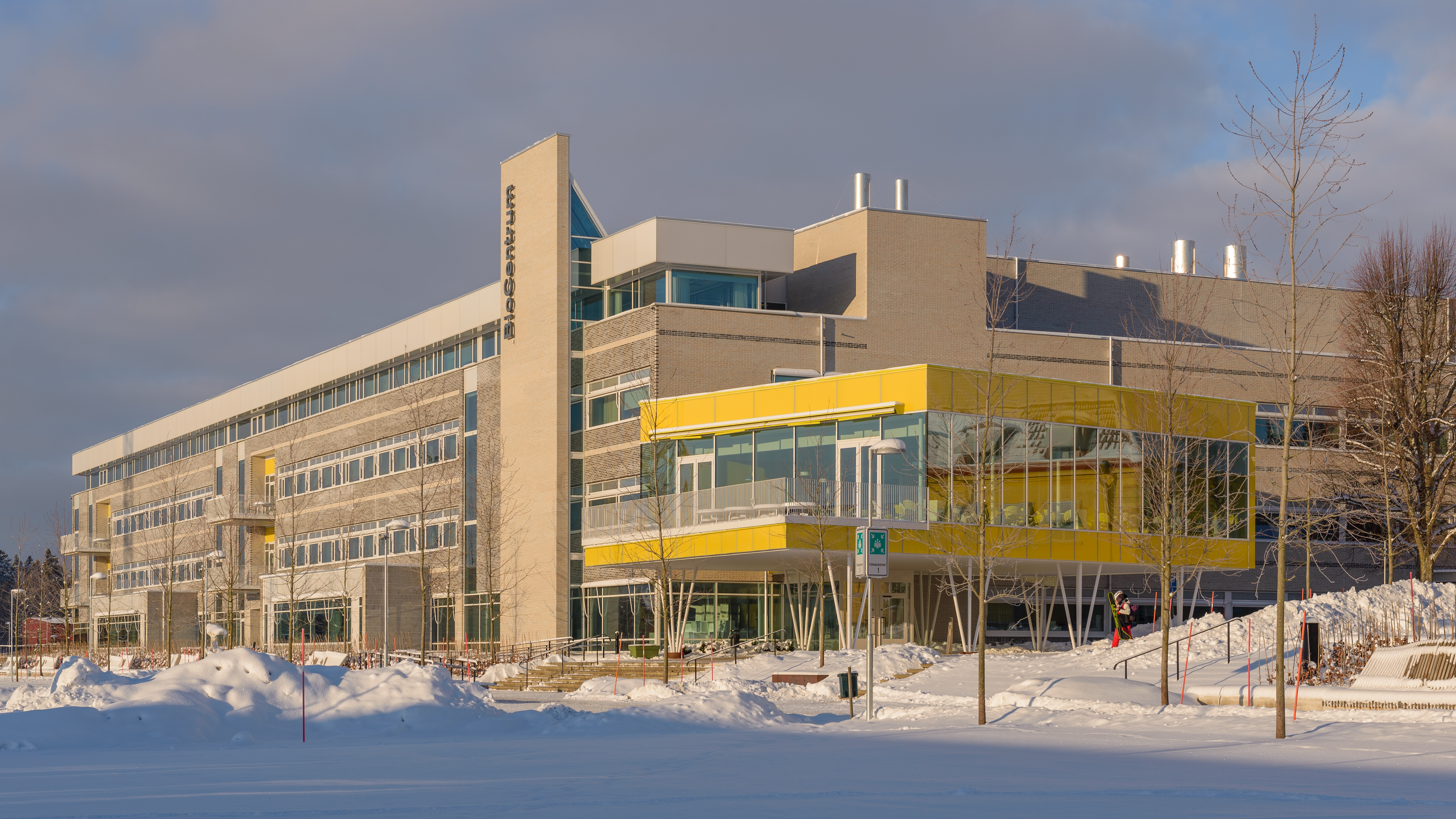
- A building of the Swedish University of Agricultural Sciences, January 2013.

- Location within Uppsala Location within Sweden
- Coordinates: 59°49′00″N 17°39′30″E
- Country: Sweden
- Province: Uppland
- County: Uppsala County
- Municipality: Uppsala Municipality

Area
  - Total: 1.2 km^{2} (0.46 sq mi)

Population (31 December 2020)
  - Total: 2,062
  - Density: 1,700/km^{2} (4,500/sq mi)
- Time zone: UTC+1 (CET)
  - Summer (DST): UTC+2 (CEST)
- Locality code: T0654

Ultuna (Swedish pronunciation: [ˈɵ̂lːˌtʉːna]) is a locality in Uppsala Municipality, Uppsala County, Sweden with 449 inhabitants in 2017. Located 5 kilometres (3 mi) south of central Uppsala, it hosts the headquarters and main campus of the Swedish University of Agricultural Sciences (Sveriges lantbruksuniversitet, SLU).

Ultuna is known for sharing (with Målilla, Småland) Sweden's heat record of 38.0 °C (100.4 °F), which was recorded on 9 July 1933.

== The name ==
The name, originally the name of an estate, is first recorded in 1221 ("in villa Wlertune"). The first element is the genitive case of the name of the Norse god Ullr. The last element is tuna 'enclosed field'.
