= Chris Mason (footballer) =

English footballer

Personal information
- Full name: Christopher Joseph Mason
- Date of birth: 26 June 1986 (age 40)
- Place of birth: Newton Aycliffe, England
- Position: Defender

Team information
- Current team: Spennymoor Town (player/coach)

Youth career
- 2002–2003: Darlington

Senior career*
Years	Team	Apps	(Gls)
2003–2005	Darlington	1	(0)
2004	→ Bishop Auckland (loan)		
2004–2005	→ Bishop Auckland (loan)		
2005–2006	Harrogate Town		(1)
2005	→ Bishop Auckland (loan)		
2006	Östavalls		(9)
2006–2007	Gateshead	18	(0)
2007	Östavalls		
2007–200?	Shildon		
2009–	Spennymoor Town	303	(10)
- * Club domestic league appearances and goals

Christopher Joseph Mason (born 26 June 1986) is an English footballer who captains and plays as a defender for Spennymoor Town.

He previously appeared in the Football League for Darlington, and played non-league football for Bishop Auckland (several spells), Harrogate Town, Gateshead and Shildon, as well as in the Swedish sixth tier for Östavalls IF. With Spennymoor, he won four Northern League titles and the 2013 FA Vase.

== Life and career ==
Mason was born in Newton Aycliffe, County Durham, where he attended Woodham Academy. He played representative football for Durham Schools before joining Darlington when he left school. He spent time on loan at Northern Premier League club Bishop Auckland in early 2004, and the club were disappointed when he was recalled to Darlington as injury cover. On the final day of the 2003–04 Football League season, the 17-year-old Mason made his senior debut for Darlington as a very late substitute in a 1–0 win away to Scunthorpe United. He was Darlington's Youth Team Player of the Year the following season, as well as spending more time with Bishop Auckland, but despite being given a first-team squad number ahead of the 2005–06 season, he was allowed to leave the club in August 2005.

Mason signed for Conference North club Harrogate Town in August 2005. He spent yet another spell on loan at Bishop Auckland at the start of the season, to maintain match fitness, before returning to Harrogate where he established himself as a first-team regular. He finished the season with 34 appearances in all competitions, mostly in the starting eleven, and scored once, but was one of several players to be released at the end of the season.

He went to Sweden, where he scored nine goals for Östavalls IF in Division 4, the sixth tier of Swedish football, and was named as the club's player of the year. When the Swedish season finished at the end of September, Mason came back to the north-east of England with Gateshead, where he made 23 appearances in all competitions, 18 in the Northern Premier League, before returning to Östavall for the 2007 season.

Having tried and failed to sign Mason the previous February, Shildon succeeded going into the 2007–08 season. Alongside playing for Shildon in the Northern League, Mason played Sunday League football for Hetton Lyons Cricket Club. He was a member of their team that won the FA Sunday Cup in 2008, and also in 2010, by which time he had moved on to Spennymoor Town. He contributed to the club's three consecutive Northern League titles in his first three seasons, was captain on the day as Spennymoor beat Tunbridge Wells 2–1 in the 2013 FA Vase Final, was appointed club captain in January 2014, and finished the season with another league title and promotion to the Northern Premier League Division One North.

== Coaching career ==
Ahead of the 2022–23 season, Mason was named as Spennymoor Town's Strength and Conditioning Coach. He was still registered as a player for the coming season.

== Outside football ==
Mason has worked as a residential social worker and as the head coach in a Crossfit gym. His partner, Beau-Louise Morton, gave birth to the couple's first child, Freddie, just before the FA Vase Final in 2013.
