= Östavall =

- Location within Västernorrland Location within Sweden
- Coordinates: 62°26′N 15°28′E
- Country: Sweden
- Province: Medelpad
- County: Västernorrland County
- Municipality: Ånge Municipality

Area
  - Total: 0.90 km^{2} (0.35 sq mi)

Population (31 December 2010)
  - Total: 222
  - Density: 247/km^{2} (640/sq mi)
- Time zone: UTC+1 (CET)
  - Summer (DST): UTC+2 (CEST)

Östavall (Swedish pronunciation: [œstaˈvalː]) is a locality situated in Ånge Municipality, Västernorrland County, Sweden with 222 inhabitants in 2010.

== Sports ==
The following sports clubs are located in Östavall:

- Östavalls IF
