= Ånge Municipality =

Ånge Municipality Ånge kommun
- Municipality
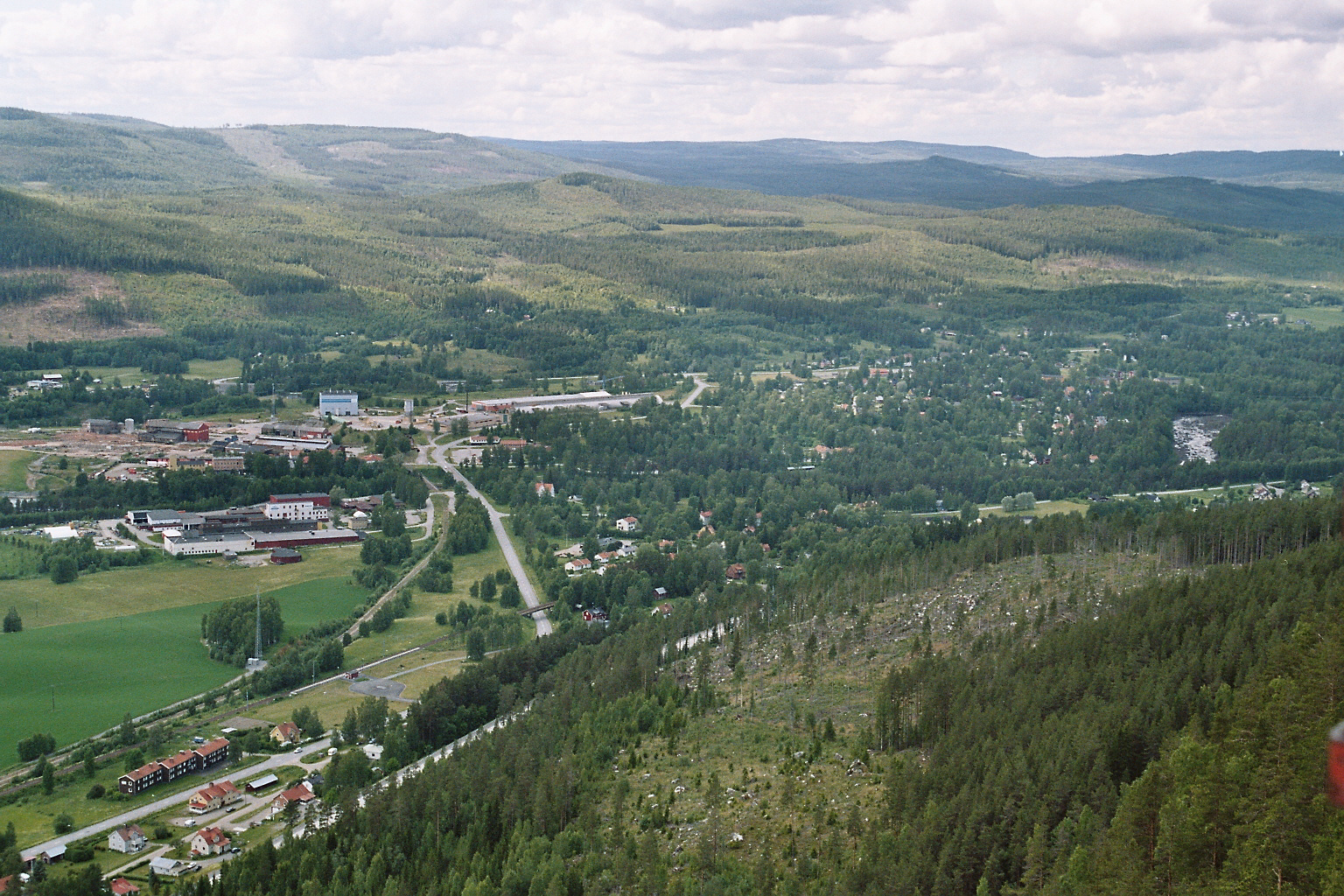
- Ljungaverk

- Flag Coat of arms

- Coordinates: 62°31′N 15°37′E
- Country: Sweden
- County: Västernorrland County
- Seat: Ånge

Area
  - Total: 3,295.56 km^{2} (1,272.42 sq mi)
  - Land: 3,051.36 km^{2} (1,178.14 sq mi)
  - Water: 244.2 km^{2} (94.3 sq mi)
- Area as of 1 January 2014.

Population (30 June 2025)
  - Total: 9,066
  - Density: 2.971/km^{2} (7.695/sq mi)
- Time zone: UTC+1 (CET)
  - Summer (DST): UTC+2 (CEST)
- ISO 3166 code: SE
- Province: Medelpad
- Municipal code: 2260

Ånge Municipality (Swedish: Ånge kommun) is a municipality in Västernorrland County, northern Sweden. Its seat is located in Ånge.

The railway junction Ånge was in 1947 made a market town (köping) and detached from Borgsjö. In 1971 they were reunited and together with Haverö and Torp the present municipality was formed.

The municipal most known slogan is Sweden's geographical center. It was in 1947 measured by the Royal Institute of Technology to be situated by the lake Munkbysjön (Lake Munkby), in the municipality's eastern parts. In 2002 the slogan was changed to Wonderful byways.

13 kilometers east of the town Ånge lies the town Borgsjö. It has a widely acclaimed rococo church from the 18th century.

== Localities ==
- Alby
- Fränsta
- Ljungaverk
- Torpshammar
- Ånge (seat)
- Ö
- Östavall

== Demographics ==
This is a demographic table based on Ånge Municipality's electoral districts in the 2022 Swedish general election sourced from SVT's election platform, in turn taken from SCB official statistics.

Residents include everyone registered as living in the district, regardless of age or citizenship status. Valid voters indicate Swedish citizens above the age of 18 who therefore can vote in general elections. Left vote and right vote indicate the result between the two major blocs in said district in the 2022 general election. Employment indicates the share of people between the ages of 20 and 64 who are working taxpayers. Foreign background is defined as residents either born abroad or with two parents born outside of Sweden. Median income is the received monthly income through either employment, capital gains or social grants for the median adult above 20, also including pensioners in Swedish kronor. The section about college graduates indicates any degree accumulated after high school.

In total there were 9,220 residents, including 7,292 Swedish citizens of voting age. 49.0% voted for the left coalition and 49.9% for the right coalition. Indicators are in percentage points except population totals and income.

Location	Residents	Citizen adults	Left vote	Right vote	Employed	Swedish parents	Foreign heritage	Income SEK	Degree
Location			%	%					
Alby	426	329	49.1	49.8	76	88	12	23,687	19
Borgsjö-Erikslund	749	594	44.6	54.6	81	93	7	24,118	25
Fränsta	1,853	1,431	50.7	48.1	81	91	9	23,554	27
Hallsta	580	463	48.7	50.0	87	95	5	24,481	27
Ljungaverk	851	644	45.2	53.4	75	89	11	22,489	20
Torpshammar	1,251	1,044	39.7	59.6	82	93	7	24,082	27
Ånge	1,215	936	50.2	48.9	84	91	9	25,999	22
Ånge C	1,629	1,282	58.7	40.4	78	86	14	21,862	29
Östavall-Byberget	666	569	44.7	53.6	75	90	10	22,450	19
Source: SVT

== Sister cities ==
Ånge's sister cities:

- Norway: Malvik
- Finland: Oravais
- Latvia: Ogre
- Laos: Beng

The Nordic sister cities were established in the 1940s, the others not before 1990.
