= Mark McLeod (English footballer) =

English footballer (born 1986)

Personal information
- Full name: Mark McLeod
- Date of birth: 15 December 1986
- Place of birth: Sunderland, England
- Position: Midfielder

Youth career
- Darlington

Senior career*
Years	Team	Apps	(Gls)
2005–2007	Darlington	6	(0)
2005	→ Harrogate Town (loan)		
2005	→ Durham City (loan)		
2006–2007	→ Workington (loan)		
2007	Östavalls IF		
2007–2008	Newcastle Blue Star		
2008–201?	Sunderland RCA (Note: The Sunderland RCA website has detailed statistics up to and including the 2010–11 season, but not thereafter. Consequently, if subject played for the club after that season, his statistics are missing from the infobox.)	37	(3)
201?–2013	Walton & Hersham		
2013–2015	Chipstead		
2015–2019	Harrow Borough	96	(0)
2016	→ Aylesbury (loan)	2	(0)
2018	→ Northwood (dual reg.)	1	(0)
2019	→ Uxbridge (loan)	6	(0)
2019–2021	Uxbridge	23	(1)
2021–2022	Hebburn Town	18	(0)
2021–2022	→ Seaham Red Star (loan)	13	(0)
2022–	Consett	8	(0)
- * Club domestic league appearances and goals as of 13 October 2022

Mark McLeod (born 15 December 1986) is an English football midfielder who plays for Northern Premier League Division One East club Consett.

He made six appearances for Darlington in the Football League, played in Sweden for Östavalls IF, and his other non-league clubs include Harrogate Town, Durham City, Workington, Newcastle Blue Star, Sunderland RCA, Walton & Hersham, Chipstead, Harrow Borough, Aylesbury, Northwood, Uxbridge, Hebburn Town and Seaham Red Star.

== Life and career ==
McLeod was born in Sunderland. He began his football career with Darlington, and captained their youth team. He spent time on loan to Harrogate Town of the Conference North and to Northern League club Durham City before making his first-team debut for Darlington on 18 March 2006, replacing Jonjo Dickman after 80 minutes of a 5–0 home defeat against Carlisle United in League Two. He made what the Evening Gazette described as "an impressive full debut" two weeks later as Darlington beat Lincoln City 4–2. He signed a professional contract at the end of the season. He played four matches in the first couple of months of the 2006–07 season, and then spent time on loan with another Conference North club, Workington.

McLeod was not retained for 2007–08, and he and former Darlington teammate Richard Logan played in Sweden for lower-league club Östavalls IF. On his return, he joined Newcastle Blue Star, managed by Tommy Cassidy for whom he had played at Workington, while completing his A-Levels at South Tyneside College. He went on to take a degree in economics at the University of York, and played for the university football team, and for Sunderland RCA of the Northern League when his studies allowed.

After graduating, McLeod worked in London as a civil servant in the Cabinet Office. A friend suggested he resume playing football on a part-time basis, and he joined Walton & Hersham of the Isthmian League Division One South. He moved on to Isthmian League clubs Chipstead and Harrow Borough, from where he spent brief spells on loan at Aylesbury, while recovering from injury in September 2016, and at Northwood. He then spent two pandemic-interrupted seasons with another Isthmian League club, Uxbridge, before returning to the north-east of England.

McLeod signed for Northern Premier League Division One East club Hebburn Town for the 2021–22 season. He made nine league appearances before joining Northern League club Seaham Red Star on a month's loan, later extended to three months, after which he made a further nine appearances before his Hebburn contract expired. McLeod returned to the Northern Premier League with Consett for the 2022–23 season.

== Style of play ==
McLeod described himself in 2015 as "a sitting midfielder, not really a box-to-box type. I'm good at breaking up play, but I don't play football just to run around and make tackles. I do like to get on the ball and play a bit as well, so the part where we actually have the ball is my favourite bit." In contrast, his Harrow Borough manager, Steve Baker, signed him to "bring physicality. He can play, too, which is great, but he can put his foot in, he's physical and every other team seems to have one like that, so we want one here." Six years later, he assessed his style as "simple: keeping the ball, battling for headers and winning tackles in the middle. I'm not too fussed about the attacking side of the game, as long I can help prevent opposition goals as much as possible."

== Career statistics ==
As of match played 11 October 2022

Appearances and goals by club, season and competition
Club	Season	League			FA Cup		League Cup		Other		Total	
Club	Season	Division	Apps	Goals	Apps	Goals	Apps	Goals	Apps	Goals	Apps	Goals
Darlington	2005–06	League Two	4	0	0	0	0	0	0	0	4	0
Darlington	2006–07	League Two	2	0	0	0	1	0	1 (Note: Appearance in Football League Trophy)	0	4	0
Darlington	Total		6	0	0	0	1	0	1	0	8	0
Sunderland RCA	2008–09	Northern League Division Two	11	1	0	0	—		2 (Note: One appearance in FA Vase, one in Ernest Armstrong Memorial Cup)	0	13	1
Sunderland RCA	2009–10	Northern League Division Two	14	2	0	0	—		1 (Note: Appearance in FA Vase)	0	15	2
Sunderland RCA	2010–11	Northern League Division One	12	0	0	0	—		2 (Note: One appearance in FA Vase, one in Durham Challenge Cup)	0	14	0
Sunderland RCA	Total		37	3	0	0	—		5	0	42	3
Harrow Borough	2015–16	Isthmian League Premier Division	30	0	1	0	—		6 (Note: One appearance in FA Trophy, one in Alan Turvey Trophy, two in Middlesex Senior Cup, one in London Senior Cup, one in 2014–15 Middlesex Charity Cup)	0	37	0
Harrow Borough	2016–17	Isthmian Premier Division	5	0	2	0	—		7 (Note: Four appearances in FA Trophy, one in Alan Turvey Trophy, two in Middlesex Senior Cup)	0	14	0
Harrow Borough	2017–18	Isthmian Premier Division	29	0	1	0	—		2 (Note: One appearance in FA Trophy, one in Alan Turvey Trophy)	0	32	0
Harrow Borough	2018–19	Southern League (SFL); Premier Division South	31	0	0	0	—		8 (Note: One appearance in FA Trophy, one in Southern League Cup, two in London Senior Cup, four in Middlesex Senior Cup)	0	39	0
Harrow Borough	2018–19	SFL Premier Division South	1	0	0	0	—		0	0	1	0
Harrow Borough	Total		96	0	4	0	—		23	0	123	0
Aylesbury (loan)	2015–16	SFL Division One Central	2	0	—		—		—		2	0
Northwood (dual reg.)	2017–18	SFL Division One East	1	0	—		—		—		1	0
Uxbridge	2019–20	Isthmian South Central Division	25	1	0	0	—		5 (Note: Two appearances in FA Trophy, two in Alan Turvey Trophy, one in Middlesex Senior Cup)	0	30	1
Uxbridge	2020–21	Isthmian South Central Division	4	0	1	0	—		3 (Note: Appearances in FA Trophy)	0	8	0
Uxbridge	Total		29	1	1	0	—		8	0	38	1
Hebburn Town	2021–22	NPL Division One East	18	1	1	0	—		0	0	19	1
Seaham Red Star (loan)	2021–22	Northern League Division One	13	0	—		—		0	0	13	0
Consett	2021–22	NPL Division One East	7	0	0	0	—		2 (Note: One appearance in FA Trophy, one in Durham Challenge Cup)	0	9	0
Career total			209	5	6	0	1	0	39	0	255	5
