= Pierre-Olivier Bakalag =

Cameroonian footballer

Personal information
- Date of birth: 14 March 1984 (age 42)
- Place of birth: Edea, Cameroon
- Position: Striker

Team information
- Current team: Azzurri

Youth career
- Brasserie du Cameroun
- Dalian Shide

Senior career*
Years	Team	Apps	(Gls)
2001–2003	Dalian Sidelong	14	(6)
2003–2004	Zhuhai Anping	19	(6)
2003	South China	1	(0)
2004–2005	Fukien	3	(1)
2005–2007	Vilnius	41	(16)
2008	DPMM	4	(1)
2008–2009	Kitchee	1	(0)
2009	Fourway	3	(0)
2010–2011	HKFC	2	(1)
2012–2013	Wing Yee		
2014–2015	Southern	33	(24)
2015–2016	Sun Source	5	(1)
2016–2017	Eastern District	12	(4)
- * Club domestic league appearances and goals

Pierre-Olivier Bakalag (born 14 March 1984) is a Cameroonian professional footballer.

== Career statistics ==
=== Club ===
Appearances and goals by club, season and competition
Club	Season	League			Cup		League Cup		Other		Total	
Club	Season	Division	Apps	Goals	Apps	Goals	Apps	Goals	Apps	Goals	Apps	Goals
South China	2003–04	First Division	1	0	0	0	0	0	0	0	1	0
Fukien	2004–05	First Division	3	1	0	0	0	0	0	0	3	1
Vilnius	2005	A Lyga	8	0	0	0	0	0	0	0	8	0
DPMM	2007–08	Malaysia Super League	4	1	0	0	0	0	0	0	4	1
Kitchee	2008–09	First Division	1	0	0	0	0	0	0	0	1	0
Fourway	2008–09	First Division	3	0	0	0	0	0	0	0	3	0
HKFC	2010–11	First Division	2	1	0	0	0	0	0	0	2	1
Sun Source	2015–16	First Division	5	1	0	0	0	0	0	0	5	1
Eastern District	2016–17	First Division	12	4	0	0	0	0	0	0	12	4
Career total			39	8	0	0	0	0	0	0	49	8
