= Ekeby, Kumla =

Ekeby
- Location in Kumla Municipality in Örebro County Ekeby (Örebro)
- Coordinates: 59°10′N 15°16′E
- Country: Sweden
- Province: Närke
- County: Örebro County
- Municipality: Kumla Municipality

Area
  - Total: 0.53 km^{2} (0.20 sq mi)

Population (31 December 2010)
  - Total: 372
  - Density: 707/km^{2} (1,830/sq mi)
- Time zone: UTC+1 (CET)
  - Summer (DST): UTC+2 (CEST)

Ekeby is a locality situated in Kumla Municipality, Örebro County, Sweden with 372 inhabitants in 2010.

== Riksdag elections ==
Year	%	Votes	V	S	MP	C	L	KD	M	SD	NyD	Left	Right
1973	91.4	641	3.7	38.5		34.0	11.4	3.9	8.0			42.3	53.7
1976	93.5	687	4.1	39.0		36.0	9.8	0.9	10.2			43.1	55.9
1979	91.0	705	3.8	40.7		31.3	8.7	1.1	13.5			44.5	53.5
1982	92.5	747	3.2	41.5	3.2	25.2	5.5	4.3	17.1			44.7	47.8
1985	89.0	724	3.6	37.2	1.2	28.2	16.0		13.1			40.7	57.3
1988	86.7	711	5.2	40.6	4.2	22.9	9.4	5.3	12.2			50.1	44.6
1991	89.1	745	3.8	34.0	2.6	17.9	6.8	11.3	14.4		9.1	37.7	50.3
1994	89.3	734	4.9	44.6	4.0	15.0	6.0	8.2	16.1		1.1	53.4	45.2
1998	84.8	667	12.0	34.9	4.6	13.5	3.1	13.2	17.2			51.6	47.1
2002	85.1	660	7.0	38.9	3.8	14.4	8.8	12.7	11.1	2.6		49.7	47.0
2006	83.8	638	3.6	39.8	3.9	11.9	4.7	12.2	16.0	5.8		47.3	44.8
2010	86.8	674	4.6	32.9	5.5	9.8	4.7	6.4	25.7	8.9		43.0	46.6
2014	87.8	692	2.9	29.3	4.5	10.0	2.9	5.8	21.5	20.5		36.7	40.2
2018	87.5	683	3.8	27.2	3.1	11.6	3.1	9.1	17.3	24.3		45.7	53.7
