= Jordan Eagers =

English footballer (born 1989)

Personal information
- Date of birth: 3 January 1989 (age 37)
- Place of birth: Sheffield, England
- Position: Midfielder

Team information
- Current team: Sheffield

Youth career
- Sheffield United

Senior career*
| Years | Team | Apps | (Gls) |
| 2005–2008 | Sheffield United | 0 | (0) |
| 2008 | IFK Mariehamn | 13 | (0) |
| 2008– | Sheffield | 0 | (0) |
- * Club domestic league appearances and goals as of 20:46, 24 June 2008 (UTC)

Jordan Eagers (born 3 January 1989) is an English footballer who played as a midfielder for Sheffield F.C.

== Playing career ==
=== Sheffield United ===
Eagers started his career as a junior player with local side Sheffield United where he spent three seasons playing in the youth sides and the reserves.

=== IFK Mariehamn ===
In April 2008, Eagers was signed by IFK Mariehamn in Finland on a short-term deal to progress his career and gain first team experience. Having played thirteen games he returned to England when his initial deal was up.

=== Sheffield F.C. ===
On returning home Eagers signed for local side Sheffield F.C. of the Northern Premier League Division One South.
