= Jesse Roast =

English footballer

Personal information
- Date of birth: 16 March 1964 (age 62)
- Place of birth: Barking, England
- Height: 6 ft 1 in (1.85 m)
- Position: Right back

Senior career*
Years	Team	Apps	(Gls)
- Barking
1989–1991	Maidstone United	32	(0)
- * Club domestic league appearances and goals

Jesse Roast (born 16 March 1964) is a former professional footballer who played in The Football League for Maidstone United.
