= Harads =

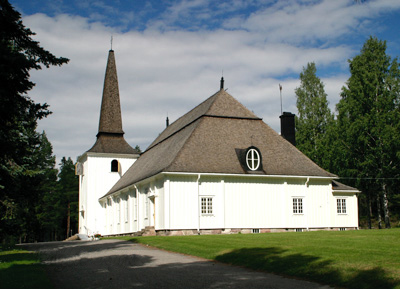
- Edefors Church in Harads.

- Location within Norrbotten Location within Sweden
- Coordinates: 66°04′N 20°59′E
- Country: Sweden
- Province: Norrbotten
- County: Norrbotten County
- Municipality: Boden Municipality

Area
  - Total: 1.29 km^{2} (0.50 sq mi)

Population (31 December 2010)
  - Total: 501
  - Density: 387/km^{2} (1,000/sq mi)
- Time zone: UTC+1 (CET)
  - Summer (DST): UTC+2 (CEST)

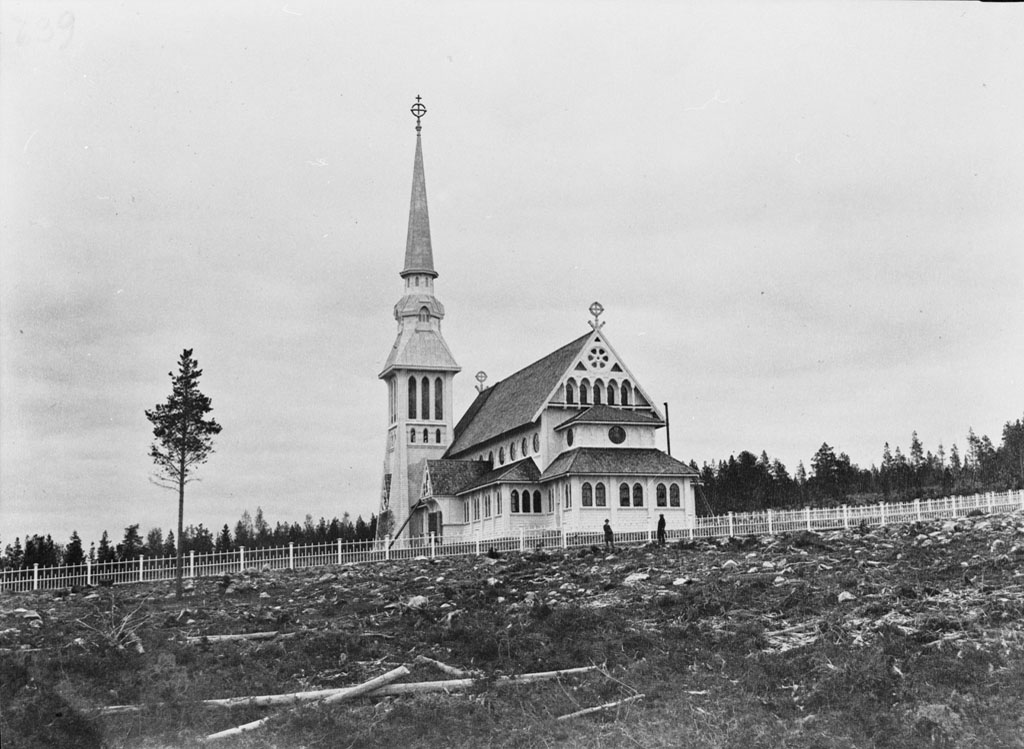
Edefors Old Church

Harads (Swedish pronunciation: [ˈhɑ̂ːrads]) is a locality situated in Boden Municipality, Norrbotten County, Sweden, approximately 50 kilometers (31 miles) south of the Arctic Circle, with 501 inhabitants in 2010. It is the main village in the parish of Edefors.

Among the key sites of the municipality is the Edefors church, from 1928, designed by Stockholm architect John Åkerlund (1884-1961) in an eclectic style, combining the simplified style of Nordic Classicism with more National Romantic elements. The church replaced an older church, dating from 1888, and designed clearly in the National Romantic style, which had been destroyed in a fire in 1918.

Harads is also the home of the Treehotel complex, devised by entrepreneur Kent Lindvall in 2010, with the "rooms" of the hotel built high into the canopy of a pine forest. The "rooms", each designed by a different architect, are encapsulated in their names, such as "Mirrorcube", "UFO", "Blue Cone", "Bird's Nest". Lindvall argues that the design idea of the hotel is based on the ecological principle of sustainability.
