= Fränsta =

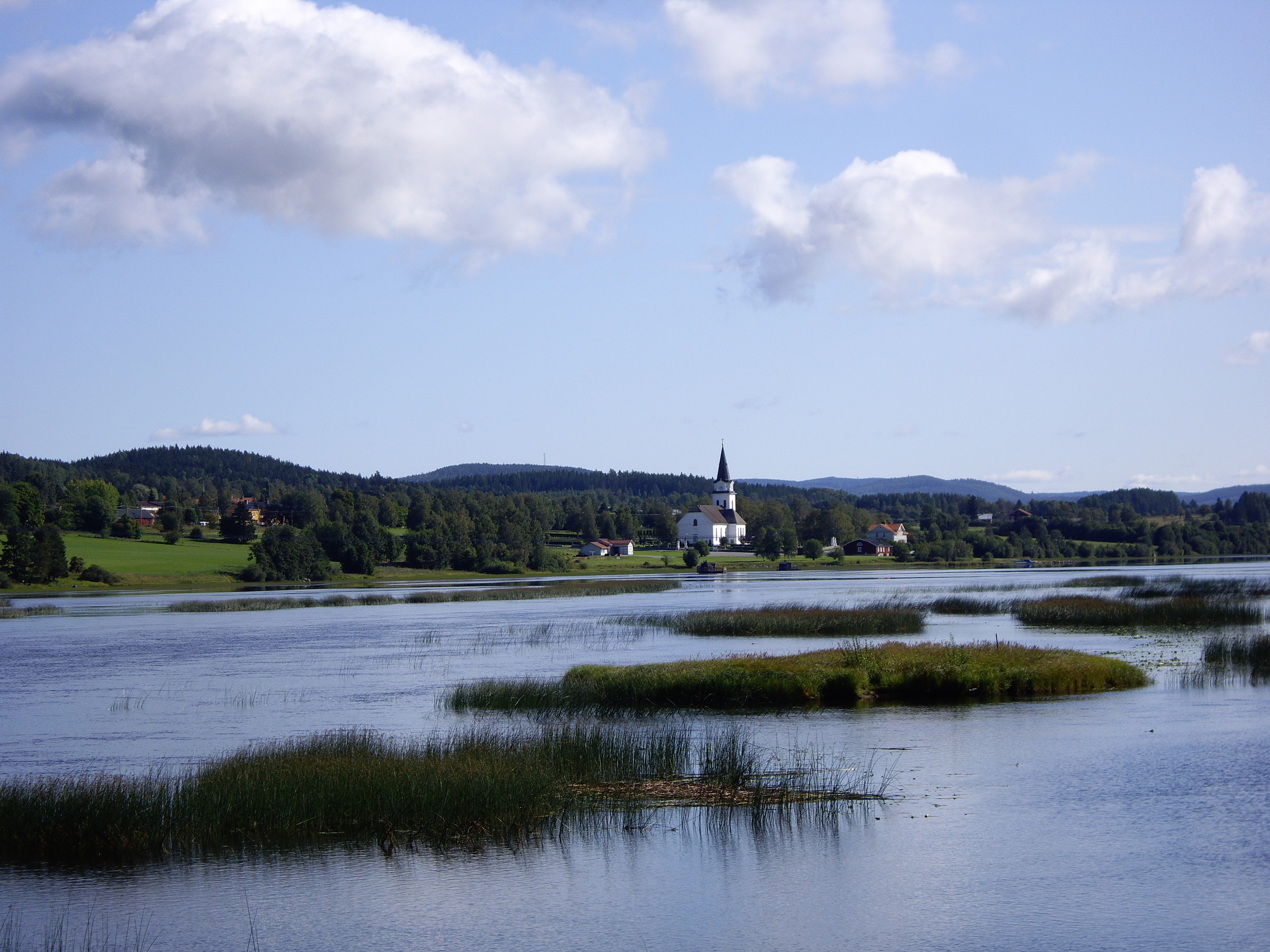

- Location within Västernorrland Location within Sweden
- Coordinates: 62°30′N 16°09′E
- Country: Sweden
- Province: Medelpad
- County: Västernorrland County
- Municipality: Ånge Municipality

Area
  - Total: 2.30 km^{2} (0.89 sq mi)

Population (31 December 2010)
  - Total: 1,256
  - Density: 546/km^{2} (1,410/sq mi)
- Time zone: UTC+1 (CET)
  - Summer (DST): UTC+2 (CEST)

Fränsta (Swedish pronunciation: [ˈfrɛ̌nːsta]) is a locality situated in Ånge Municipality, Västernorrland County, Sweden with 2,002 (2023) inhabitants, an area of 6.11 square kilometers and a population density of 328 inhabitants per km^{2}.
