= Conor Okus =

English footballer

Personal information
- Full name: Conor Ekundayo Okus
- Date of birth: 15 September 1991 (age 35)
- Place of birth: Barking & Dagenham, London, England
- Position: Midfielder

Team information
- Current team: Redbridge

Youth career
- 2000–2008: West Ham United

Senior career*
Years	Team	Apps	(Gls)
2008–2010	West Ham United	0	(0)
2010–2012	Dagenham & Redbridge	0	(0)
2010	→ Thurrock (loan)	10	(0)
2011	→ Ebbsfleet United (loan)	14	(1)
2012	→ Havant & Waterlooville (loan)	4	(0)
2013	Brentwood Town	8	(0)
2015	Durham City	8	(0)
2015–2016	Washington	30	(4)
2016–2018	May & Baker	55	(11)
2018-2020	Redbridge	30	(10)
- * Club domestic league appearances and goals as of 13:37, 14 January 2020 (UTC)

Conor Ekundayo Okus (born 15 September 1991) is an English footballer who plays as a midfielder.

Okus started his career at the age of ten as a youngster with West Ham United and signed a scholarship for the club in 2008. In 2010 Okus was released by West Ham and went on to sign a two-year professional contract with Dagenham & Redbridge. Okus spent time on loan at a number of Conference South teams including Thurrock, Havant & Waterlooville and helped Ebbsfleet United F.C gain promotion during a 3-month loan spell in the 2010–2011 season.

In March 2012 Okus left Dagenham & Redbridge by mutual consent. The following year Okus had a short stay at Isthmian League club Brentwood Town.

A move to the North East has seen Okus sign for Durham City in summer 2015 before moving on to sign for Washington.
