= Östavalls IF =

Swedish football club

- Full name: Östavalls Idrottsförening
- Founded: 1928
- Ground: Skogsvallens IP; Östavall; Sweden
- Chairman: Erik Lövgren
- League: Division 4 Medelpad
Home colours	Away colours

Östavalls IF is a Swedish football club located in Östavall.

== Background ==
Östavalls IF currently plays in Division 3 Mellersta Norrland which is the fifth tier of Swedish football. They play their home matches at the Skogsvallens IP in Östavall.

The club is affiliated to Medelpads Fotbollförbund.

== Season to season ==
Season	Level	Division	Section	Position	Movements
2004	Tier 5	Division 4	Medelpad	5th	
2005	Tier 5	Division 4	Medelpad	6th	
2006*	Tier 6	Division 4	Medelpad	3rd	
2007	Tier 6	Division 4	Medelpad	10th	Relegated
2008	Tier 7	Division 5	Medelpad	1st	Promoted
2009	Tier 6	Division 4	Medelpad	7th	
2010	Tier 6	Division 4	Medelpad	4th	
2011	Tier 6	Division 4	Medelpad	7th	

* League restructuring in 2006 resulted in a new division being created at Tier 3 and subsequent divisions dropping a level.
