= Mark Blackhall =

English footballer

Personal information
- Full name: Mark Christopher Blackhall
- Date of birth: 17 November 1960 (age 65)
- Place of birth: Upney, Essex, England
- Height: 6 ft 0 in (1.83 m)
- Position: Striker

Youth career
- 1977–1981: Orient

Senior career*
Years	Team	Apps	(Gls)
1981–1983	Orient	18	(1)
1983–1984	Chelmsford City	36	(13)
- * Club domestic league appearances and goals

Mark Christopher Blackhall (born 17 November 1960 in Upney, Essex) is an English former footballer who played as a striker, mainly for Orient.

Blackhall was a product of Orient's youth system, and made his first team debut as a substitute in the 1981–82 FA Cup third round victory over Charlton Athletic on 2 January 1982. After making three league appearances as a substitute, his first senior start came in the 3–0 victory over Leicester City on 18 May 1982.

He featured occasionally for Orient during the following season, and scored his only goal for the club, a diving header, in the 5–2 defeat at Brentford on 22 January 1983. He also appeared in the 1–0 defeat at Newport County in the second round of the 1982–83 FA Cup, both legs of the 3–2 aggregate defeat to Gillingham in the first round of the League Cup that season, and all three of Orient's matches in the Football League Trophy. Although Blackhall was never a first team regular, Orient manager Ken Knighton praised him for his attitude in training.

Later that year, he moved into non-league football with Chelmsford City, and later owned a nightclub in Southend-on-Sea.

== Statistics ==
Club	Season	League			FA Cup		EFL Cup		Other		Total	
Club	Season	Division	Apps	Goals	Apps	Goals	Apps	Goals	Apps	Goals	Apps	Goals
Orient	1981–82	Division Two	4	0	1	0	0	0	0	0	5	0
Orient	1982–83	Division Three	14	1	1	0	2	0	3 (Note: Appearance(s) in EFL Trophy)	0	20	1
Career total			18	1	2	0	2	0	3	0	25	1
