= Naimakka =

- Interactive map of Naimakka
- Country: Sweden
- Province: Swedish Lapland
- County: Norrbotten
- Municipality: Kiruna

Naimakka is Sweden's northernmost weather station and a small settlement in Kiruna Municipality, Norrbotten County with one permanent inhabitant as of 2018, who has been mentioned in several media articles.

Naimakka is right on the water boundary between Sweden and Finland and is located close to Finnish settlement of Ropinsalmi. Its closest Swedish settlement of a village size is Karesuando, some 55 kilometres (34 mi) of travel to its southeast.

The settlement has very few dwellings and is only accessible by hiking across the Könkämäeno river's ice sheet in winter or by boat in summer. The E8 highway goes adjacent to the river on the Finnish side.

Naimakka has midnight sun approximately in between 24 May and 21 July, with polar night (as in the sun being below 0.0° sun angle for 24 hours) in between 2 December and 11 January, although it has got about five hours of twilight during that period.

== Climate ==
Naimakka has a continental subarctic climate (Köppen climate classification Dfc), with cold and long winters. Summers are short, but can get occasional temperatures in the higher 20's celsius, although 30 °C (86 °F) has never been recorded. The warmest ever temperature was set on 18 July 2018. That day recorded 29.5 °C (85.1 °F), with the month also ending up being Naimakka's warmest ever at 17 °C (63 °F) in means for a 23.3 °C (73.9 °F) average high. In contrast, the coldest ever month was −23.7 °C (−10.7 °F) in February 1966. Due to its lower elevation in a valley, summers are warm enough to permit the growing of trees, although the higher elevations in the mountain it sits beneath is made up of tundra.

The local climate is comparatively less severe compared to most other locations at 68°N, although it is also a lot colder than coastal locations in Northern Norway that have strong influences from the North Atlantic Current, an influence weakening farther inland. As a result of the landmass and absence of cool waters in summer, Naimakka is briefly warmer than those locations during July only.

Naimakka's weather station used to be located on Finnish soil on the other easier accessible side of the river. This was before an automated station was set up on the Swedish side in 1995. Both stations, although in different jurisdictions, count as one record in Naimakka's historical data.

Due to Naimakka's high latitude, combined with being inland and elevated, it is one of Sweden's and also the European Union's coldest station locations. It is also sizeably colder than Karesuando in spite of the relative proximity.

Climate data for Naimakka (1991–2020; extremes since 1944)
Month	Jan	Feb	Mar	Apr	May	Jun	Jul	Aug	Sep	Oct	Nov	Dec	Year
Record high °C (°F)	6.5 (43.7)	6.5 (43.7)	9.0 (48.2)	11.6 (52.9)	26.8 (80.2)	29.1 (84.4)	29.5 (85.1)	27.9 (82.2)	22.8 (73.0)	13.0 (55.4)	9.5 (49.1)	7.7 (45.9)	29.5 (85.1)
Mean maximum °C (°F)	2.2 (36.0)	3.2 (37.8)	3.9 (39.0)	8.1 (46.6)	18.4 (65.1)	22.6 (72.7)	24.2 (75.6)	23.3 (73.9)	17.5 (63.5)	9.5 (49.1)	4.5 (40.1)	3.7 (38.7)	26.0 (78.8)
Mean daily maximum °C (°F)	−11.0 (12.2)	−9.6 (14.7)	−4.7 (23.5)	0.6 (33.1)	6.9 (44.4)	13.7 (56.7)	16.8 (62.2)	14.5 (58.1)	8.2 (46.8)	1.6 (34.9)	−4.5 (23.9)	−8.5 (16.7)	2.0 (35.6)
Daily mean °C (°F)	−16.6 (2.1)	−15.1 (4.8)	−10.3 (13.5)	−4.3 (24.3)	2.6 (36.7)	9.1 (48.4)	11.7 (53.1)	9.6 (49.3)	4.1 (39.4)	−1.9 (28.6)	−9.3 (15.3)	−14.0 (6.8)	−2.9 (26.9)
Mean daily minimum °C (°F)	−22.2 (−8.0)	−20.8 (−5.4)	−15.6 (3.9)	−9.3 (15.3)	−1.7 (28.9)	4.4 (39.9)	6.2 (43.2)	4.6 (40.3)	−0.1 (31.8)	−5.4 (22.3)	−14.0 (6.8)	−19.3 (−2.7)	−7.8 (18.0)
Mean minimum °C (°F)	−35.6 (−32.1)	−35.8 (−32.4)	−30.5 (−22.9)	−22.6 (−8.7)	−9.0 (15.8)	−2.0 (28.4)	0.7 (33.3)	−2.2 (28.0)	−6.7 (19.9)	−17.2 (1.0)	−27.9 (−18.2)	−32.8 (−27.0)	−39.1 (−38.4)
Record low °C (°F)	−48.9 (−56.0)	−45.8 (−50.4)	−40.7 (−41.3)	−36.0 (−32.8)	−23.3 (−9.9)	−5.5 (22.1)	−3.0 (26.6)	−7.4 (18.7)	−14.8 (5.4)	−29.0 (−20.2)	−37.6 (−35.7)	−43.8 (−46.8)	−48.9 (−56.0)
Average precipitation mm (inches)	22.9 (0.90)	20.1 (0.79)	15.0 (0.59)	16.9 (0.67)	40.3 (1.59)	63.0 (2.48)	86.6 (3.41)	58.6 (2.31)	49.7 (1.96)	31.8 (1.25)	25.7 (1.01)	27.0 (1.06)	457.6 (18.02)
Source 1: SMHI Open Data
Source 2: SMHI climate data 2002–2018
