= SSK =

SSK may refer to:

- Sosyal Sigortalar Kurumu, a former government agency in Turkey
- SSK (hull classification symbol), denoting a diesel-powered attack submarine
- SSK Industries, firearm manufacturer
- Mercedes-Benz SSK, a 1930s car
- Sentral di Sindikatonan di Korsou, the Trade Union Centre of Curaçao
- Sistema Simvolicheskogo Kodirovanija, an assembly language for Minsk family of computers
- Sociology of scientific knowledge
- Selånger SK, sports club in Sweden
  - Selånger SK Bandy
  - Selånger FK
- Sandslåns SK, sports club in Sweden
- Sunnanå SK, sports club in Sweden
- Södertälje SK, ice hockey club in Sweden
- Slovene Union, Italian political party
- SSK (Shimizu Shokuin Kaisha), a Japanese manufacturing company specializing in canned seafood goods
