= 2015 4 Nations Cup =

Tournament details
- Host country: Sweden
- Venues: 3 (in 3 host cities)
- Dates: 4–8 November
- Teams: 4

Final positions
- Champions: United States (6th title)
- Runners-up: Canada
- Third place: Finland
- Fourth place: Sweden

Tournament statistics
- Games played: 8
- Goals scored: 38 (4.75 per game)

The 2015 4 Nations Cup was a women's ice hockey tournament held in Kovland, Njurunda, and Sundsvall, Sweden. It was the 20th edition of the 4 Nations Cup.

== Results ==
=== Preliminary round ===
Pos	Team	Pld	W	OTW	OTL	L	GF	GA	GD	Pts	Qualification
1	United States	3	3	0	0	0	16	2	+14	9	Advance to Gold medal game
2	Canada	3	2	0	0	1	5	4	+1	6	Advance to Gold medal game
3	Finland	3	1	0	0	2	3	10	−7	3	Advance to Bronze medal game
4	Sweden (H)	3	0	0	0	3	4	12	−8	0	Advance to Bronze medal game

Source: Hockey Canada
Rules for classification: 1) points; 2) head-to-head points; 3) head-to-head goal difference; 4) head-to-head number of goals scored; 5) result against closest best-ranked team outside tied teams; 6) result against second-best ranked team outside tied teams; 7) seeding before tournament.
(H) Host

4 November 2015	Canada	2–0	Finland	Sundsvall Energi Arena, Sundsvall

4 November 2015	Sweden	2–6	United States	Sundsvall Energi Arena, Sundsvall

5 November 2015	United States	3–0	Canada	Ånäshallen, Kovland

5 November 2015	Sweden	1–3	Finland	Njurunda ishall, Njurunda

7 November 2015	Sweden	1–3	Canada	Sundsvall Energi Arena, Sundsvall

7 November 2015	Finland	0–7	United States	Sundsvall Energi Arena, Sundsvall

=== Bronze medal game ===
8 November 2015	Sweden	2–3	Finland	Sundsvall Energi Arena, Sundsvall

=== Gold medal game ===
8 November 2015	Canada	2–3 OT	United States	Sundsvall Energi Arena, Sundsvall

== Statistics ==
=== Final standings ===
Gold medal	United States
Silver medal	Canada
Bronze medal	Finland
4	Sweden
