= Katrineholms SK =

Katrineholms SK is a Swedish sports club located in Katrineholm, with several departments:

- Katrineholms SK Bandy, bandy department, now defunct
- Katrineholms SK Fotboll, association football department
