= Vaik =

Vaik or VAIK may refer to:

- Vayk, a town in Armenia
- Västerstrands AIK, a bandy club in Sweden
- Mait Vaik (born 1969), Estonian writer and musician
