= Habo IF =

Swedish sports club

- Full name: Habo idrottsförening
- Nicknames: HIF
- Sport: association football, earlier also athletics, bandy, handball, table tennis, cycling, racewalking, Nordic skiing, orienteering, and gymnastics
- Founded: 26 April 1926
- Based in: Habo, Sweden
- Ballpark: Slättens IP

Habo IF is a sports club in Habo in Sweden, established on 26 April 1926, now only playing association football. The men's bandy team, which has played in the Swedish second division, played the qualifying rounds for the Swedish top division three times during the 1940s. In 1944, the bandy team lost 3–6 against IFK Nässjö in the qualifying rounds. The bandy section was disestablished in 1998. The club has also competed in athletics, handball, table tennis, cycling, racewalking, Nordic skiing, orienteering, and gymnastics. It is the mother club of Erik Edman and Zlatan Muslimović.
