= Kareby IS =

Swedish sports club

- Full name: Kareby idrottssällskap
- Sports: Bandy, Football, Tennis and Floorball
- Founded: 20 April 1945
- Based in: Kareby, Sweden
- Stadium: Skarpe Nord, Kringledammen, Kareby Hed

Kareby IS, is a sports club in Kareby, Kungälv Municipality, Sweden. The team colours are red, blue and white. The club was founded on 20 April 1945. It is now playing bandy, football , tennis and floorball. The ice practices and matches in bandy are done at Skarpe Nord in Kungälv.

The club won the Swedish women's bandy national championship in 2011, 2015, 2016 and 2017 and has also been the runner-up a couple of times. The women's bandy team won the Swedish national championship again in 2015 by winning the final game, 3–1, against AIK. Even in 2017, the women's team won the Swedish national bandy championship, defeating Västerås SK, 4–1, in the final-game.

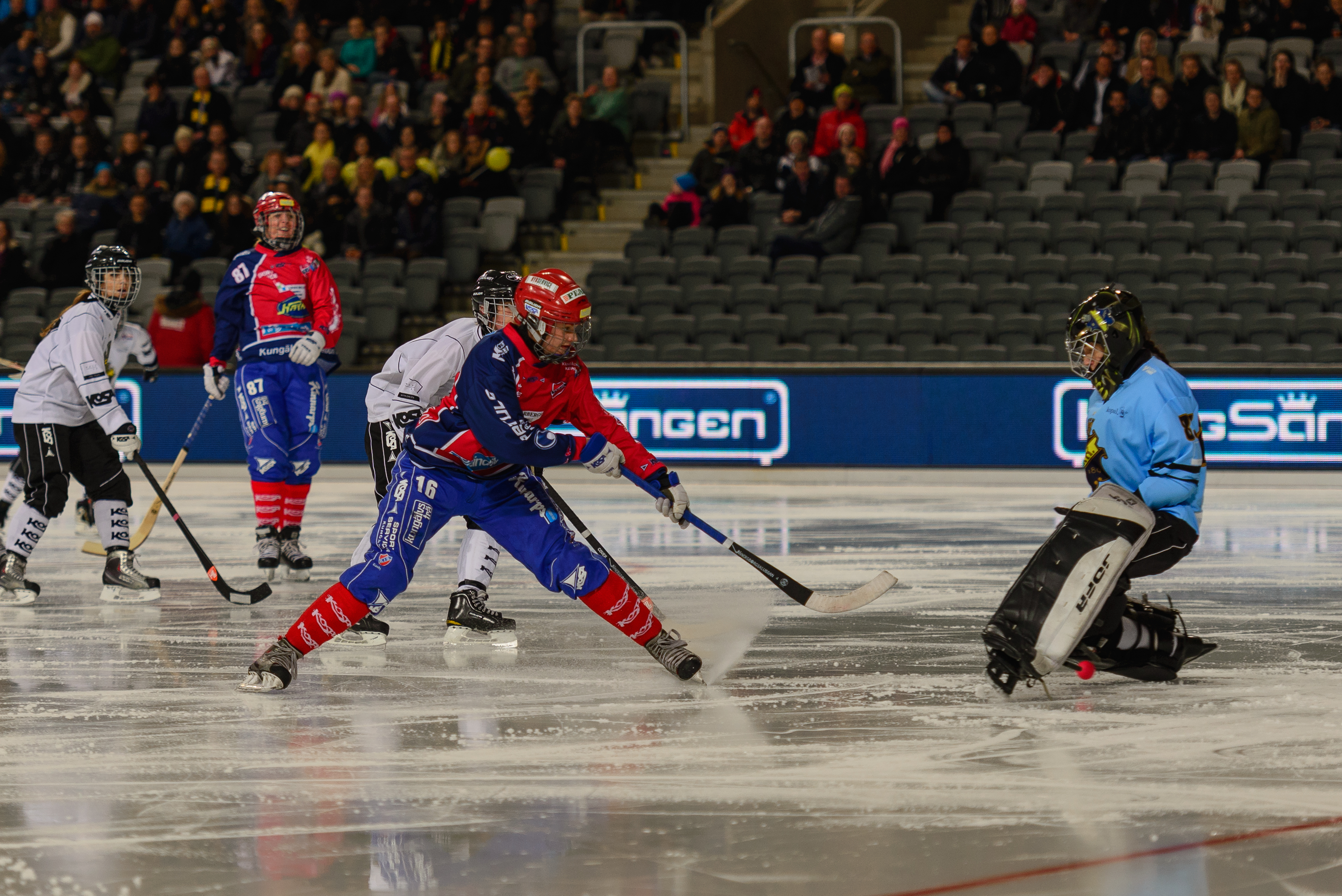
In the national final 2015

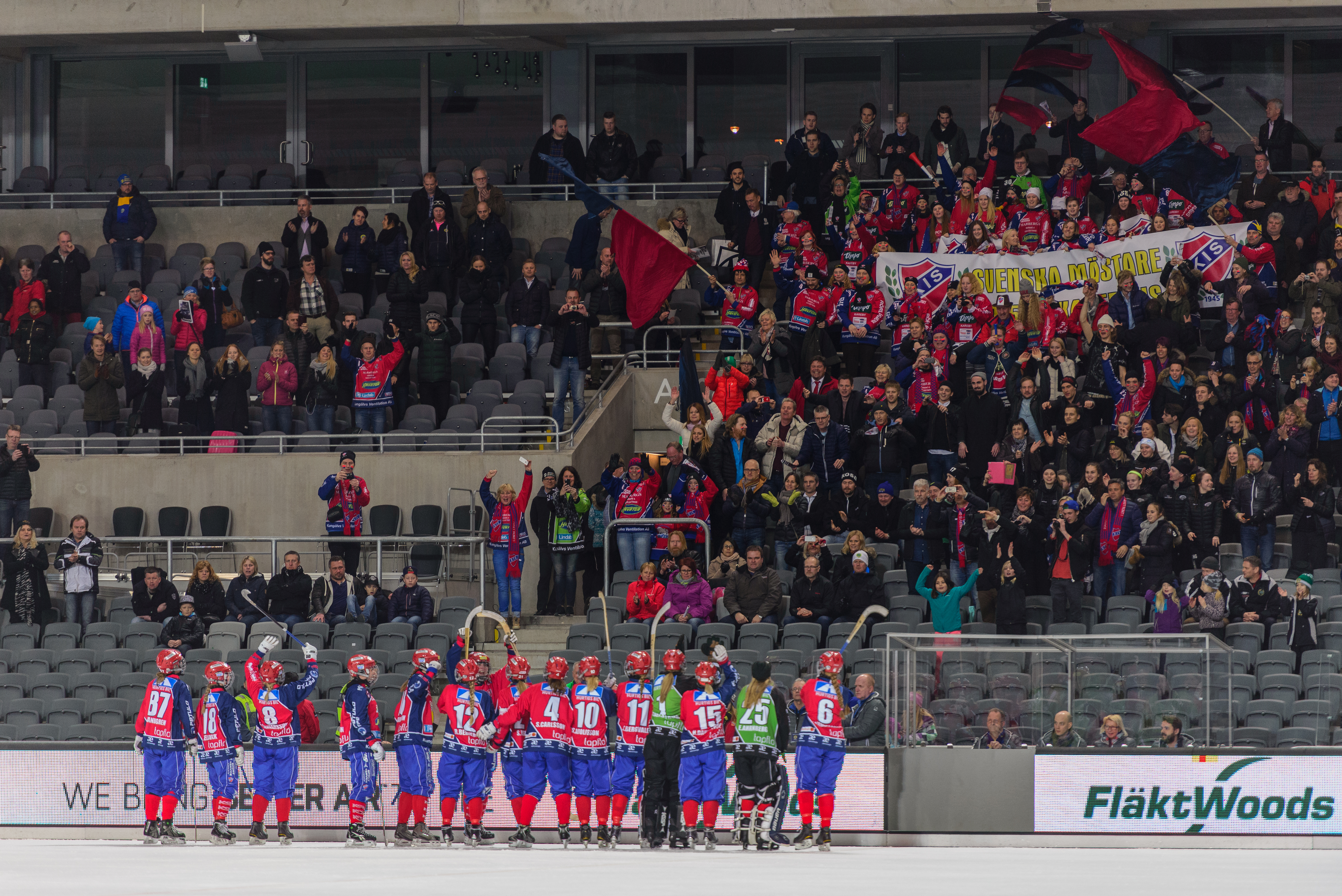
After the victory in 2015

In September 2018, it was announced the club's women's bandy team would withdraw from the Swedish top division for the 2018–2019 season.
