= Trudovye Rezervy Stadium =

Trudovye Rezervy Stadium may refer to:

- Trudovye Rezervy Stadium (Kazan), located in Kazan, Russia
- Trudovye Rezervy Stadium (Kursk), located in Kursk, Russia

== See also ==
- Trudovye Rezervy, a voluntary sports society of the USSR
