= Katrineholm Värmbol BS =

- City: Katrineholm, Sweden
- League: Division 1
- Division: Mellersta
- Founded: 1 July 2007; 18 years ago
- Home arena: Backavallen
- Website: www.katrineholmbandy.se

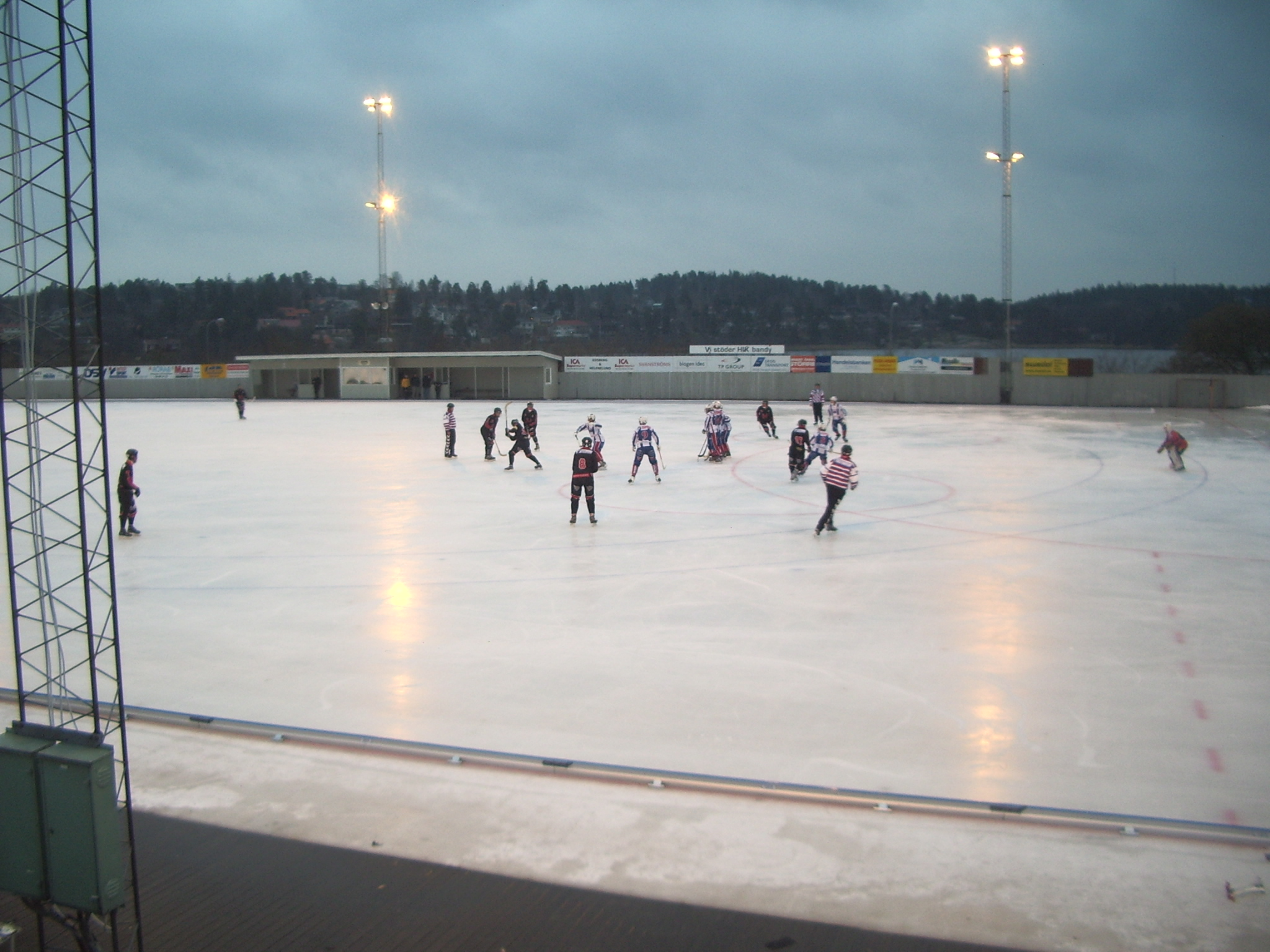
Bandy game between Helenelunds IK and Katrineholm Värmbol BS in Allsvenskan, at the Helenelund home ice Sollentunavallen, season 2008/2009.

Katrineholm Värmbol BS, KVBS, Katrineholms Bandy, is a bandy club in Katrineholm in Sweden, founded in 2007. The club was playing in Elitserien, the top-tier of Swedish bandy, for the 2009–10 season, but have played in the second level Allsvenskan all other seasons so far.

The club was created by fusioning the bandy department of the multi-sport club Katrineholms SK with the bandy club Värmbol-Katrineholm BK.
