= Peter Winbäck =

Swedish bandy player

Personal information
- Date of birth: 30 September 1982 (age 42)
- Playing position: Midfielder

Youth career
- Viljan

Senior career*
Years	Team	Apps^{†}	(Gls)^{†}
2001–2002	Hälleforsnäs		
2002–2004	Katrineholm		
2003–2004	Värmbol-Katrineholm		
2004–2005	Katrineholm		
2005–2006	Sirius		
2006–2007	Hammarby		
2007–2008	Gustavsberg		
2007–2008	Hammarby		
2008–2011	Tillberga		
2010–2011	Djurgården		
2011–2012	Tillberga		
2012–2015	Gustavsberg		
- * Senior club appearances and goals counted for the domestic league only. † Appearances (Goals).

Peter Winbäck (born 30 September 1982) is a Swedish former bandy midfielder.

Winbäck played for Hälleforsnäs IF, Katrineholms SK, Värmbol-Katrineholm BK, IK Sirius, Hammarby IF, Gustavsbergs IF, Tillberga IK, and Djurgårdens IF.
