= Selånger =

Village in Sundsvall Municipality, Sweden

Coordinates: 62.408°N 17.205°E

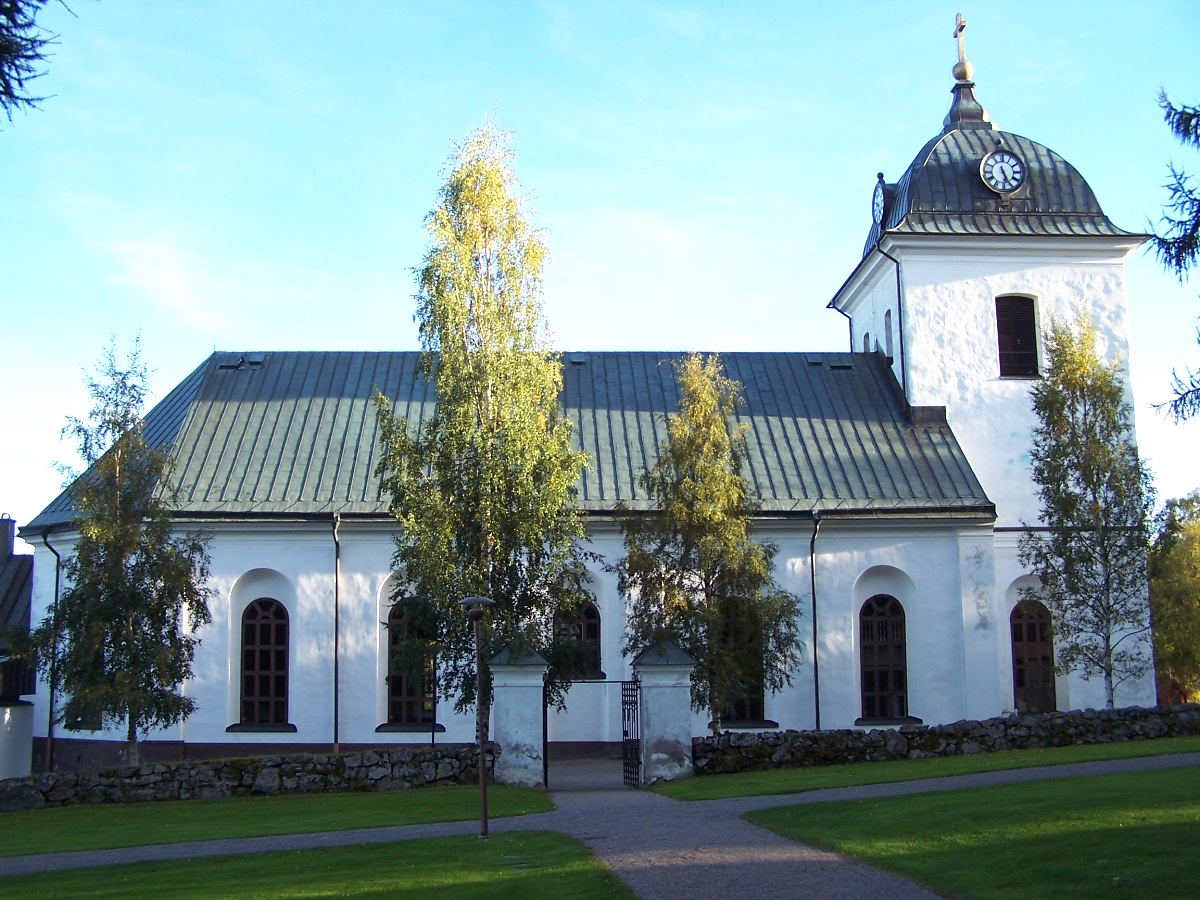
Selånger Church.

Selånger (Swedish pronunciation: [sɛˈlɔ̌ŋːɛr, ˈsêːˌlɔŋːɛr]) is a small village in Sundsvall Municipality, Sweden. The village has grown up around Selånger Church. Selångersån runs through the village.

Selånger is known for its sports club Selånger SK with the department clubs Selånger SK Bandy and Selånger FK.
