= List of Swedish bandy champions =

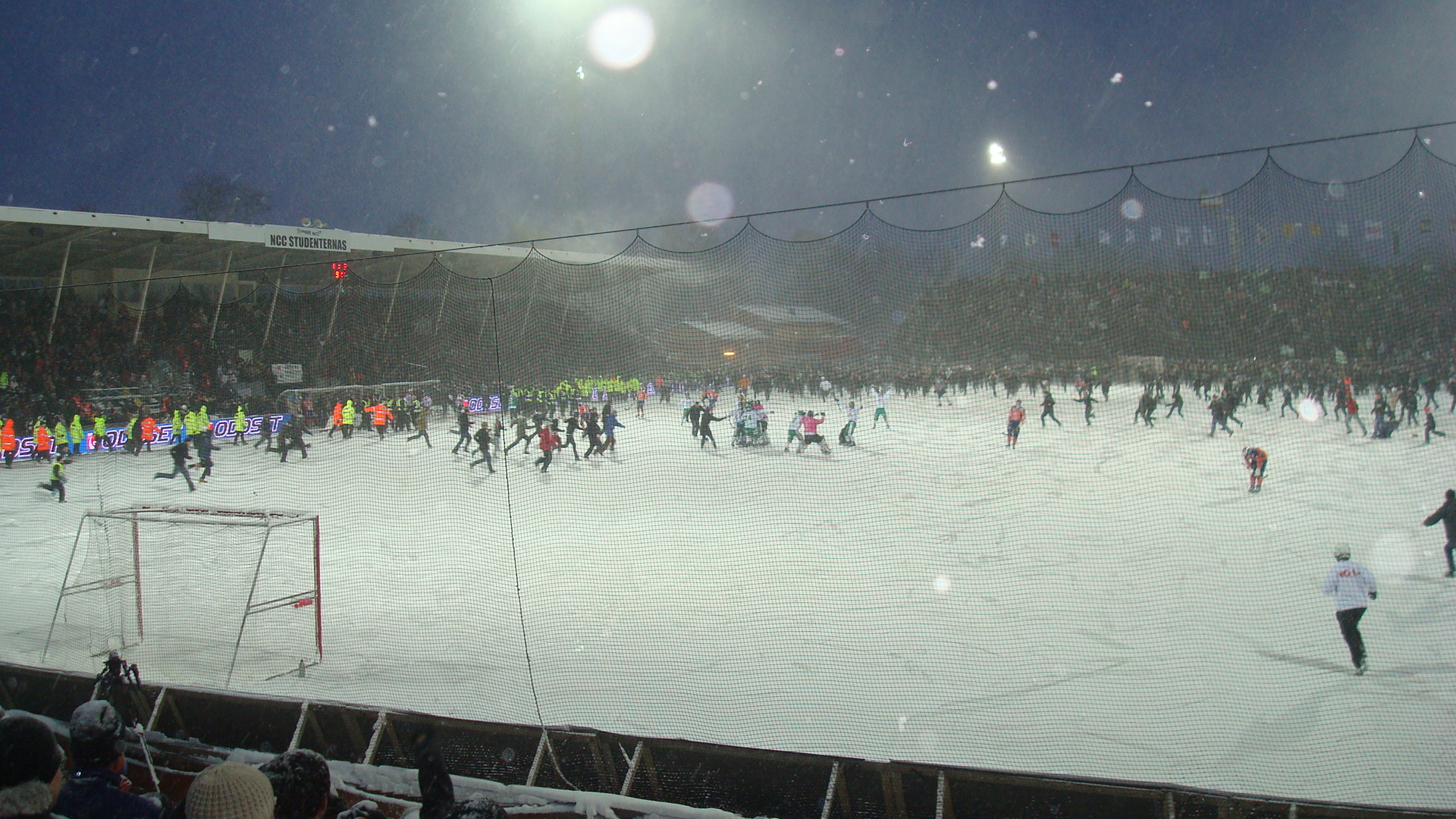
Final 2010, Hammarby IF v. Bollnäs GIF at Studenternas IP in Uppsala.

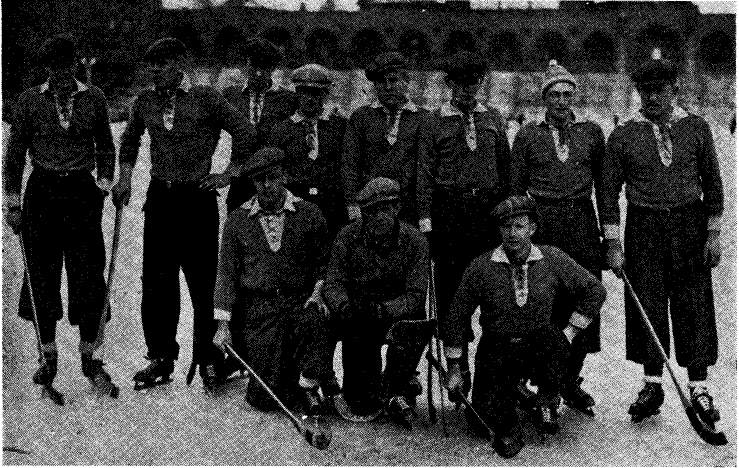
The Swedish champions 1934, Slottsbrons IF, at Stockholm Olympic Stadium

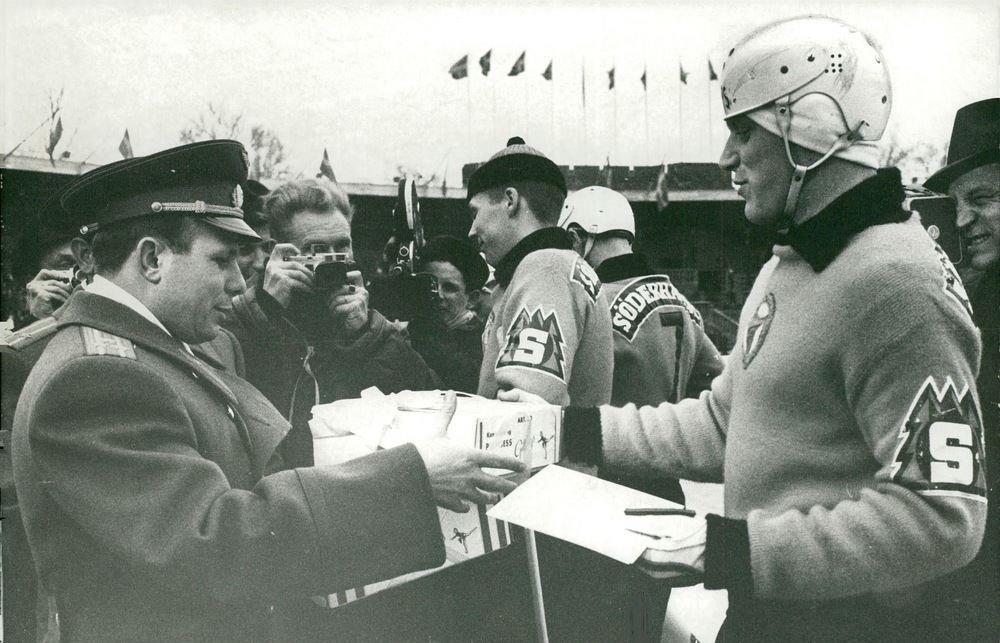
Yuri Gagarin at the 1964 final

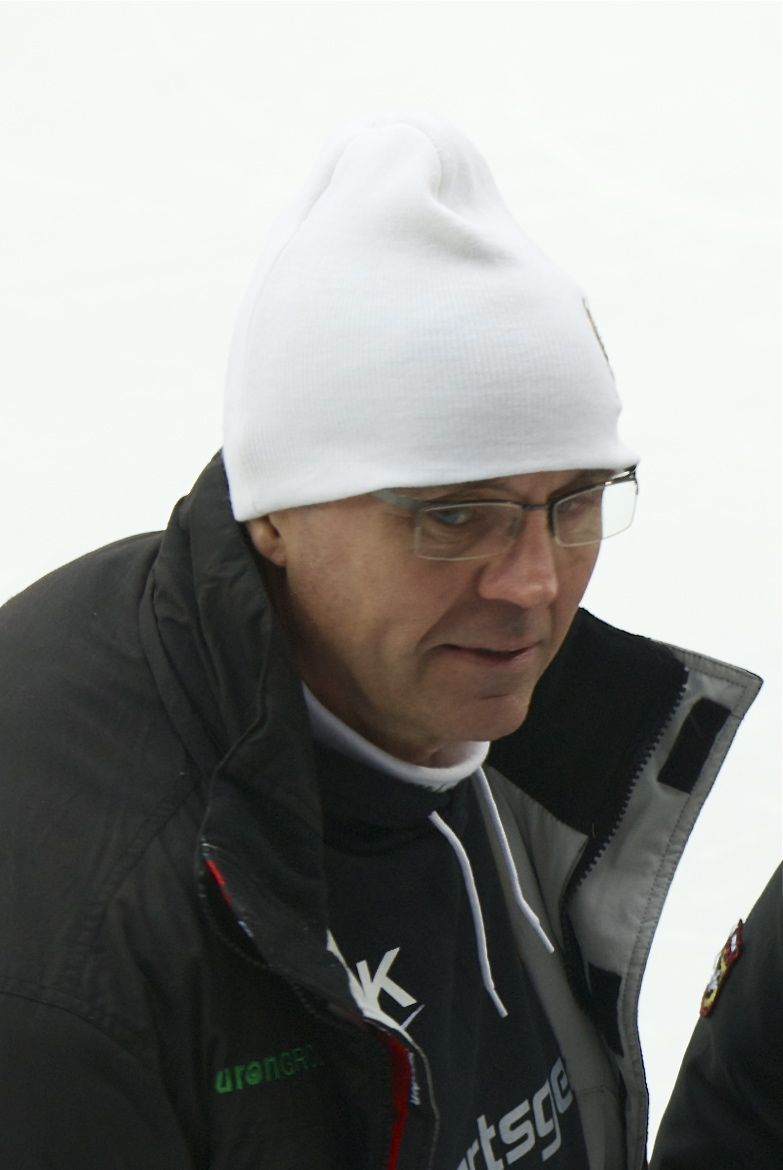
Stefan Karlsson became Swedish champion for three different clubs, Brobergs IF, IF Boltic and Vetlanda BK. Another player who has achieved it is Ola Johansson.

Swedish bandy champions (Swedish: Svenska mästare i bandy) is a title held by the winners of the final of the highest Swedish bandy league played each year, Elitserien.

The final is called Svenska bandyfinalen ("Swedish Bandy Final") and is played in March. From the 2007–08 season, Saturday replaced Sunday as the final date, but was changed back to Sunday again and again to Saturday in 2015 in 2010. In 2009 Eurosport 2 showed it for the 1st time.

== History ==
The first final was held in 1907, when IFK Uppsala beat IFK Gävle with 4–1 in Boulognerskogen, Gävle.

In 1912 two winners were declared, because no replay of the tied final could be played due to the weather.

== Venue ==
The arena with the most finals is Stockholm Olympic Stadium in Stockholm (50 times), Söderstadion in Stockholm (23) and Studenternas IP (17). Other venues are Rocklunda IP in Västerås, Idrottsparken in Norrköping, the bay of Brunnsviken in Stockholm, Tunavallen in Eskilstuna, Strömvallen in Gävle and Tingvalla IP in Karlstad.

Until the mid-20th Century, bandy was often played on naturally frozen lakes. The final was played on lakes eight times, 1907, 1910, 1912, 1914, 1915, 1934 (the replay), 1943 (the replay), and 1949.

From 1991 to 2012, all men's finals have been held on Studenternas IP in Uppsala. The final weekend starts with finals for youth's, junior's and women's team on Saturday and the men's final on Sunday. From 2013 the new venue was Friends Arena. In 2013 and 2014 the final was played at Friends Arena in Solna and from 2015 it was played at Tele2 Arena in Stockholm. On 8 May 2017, the it was announced that the finals would be moved back to Studenternas IP.

In September 2023, the Swedish Bandy Association decided that the 2024 men's, women's and youth finals would be played in the ABB Arena in Västerås.

In June 2024, the Swedish Bandy Association and Västerås Municipality agreed that even the 2025 and 2026 finals would be played in Västerås.

The attendance record of the finals is from March 16, 2013, when 38,474 people saw Hammarby IF against Sandvikens AIK on Friends Arena.

== Winners throughout the years ==
=== Men ===
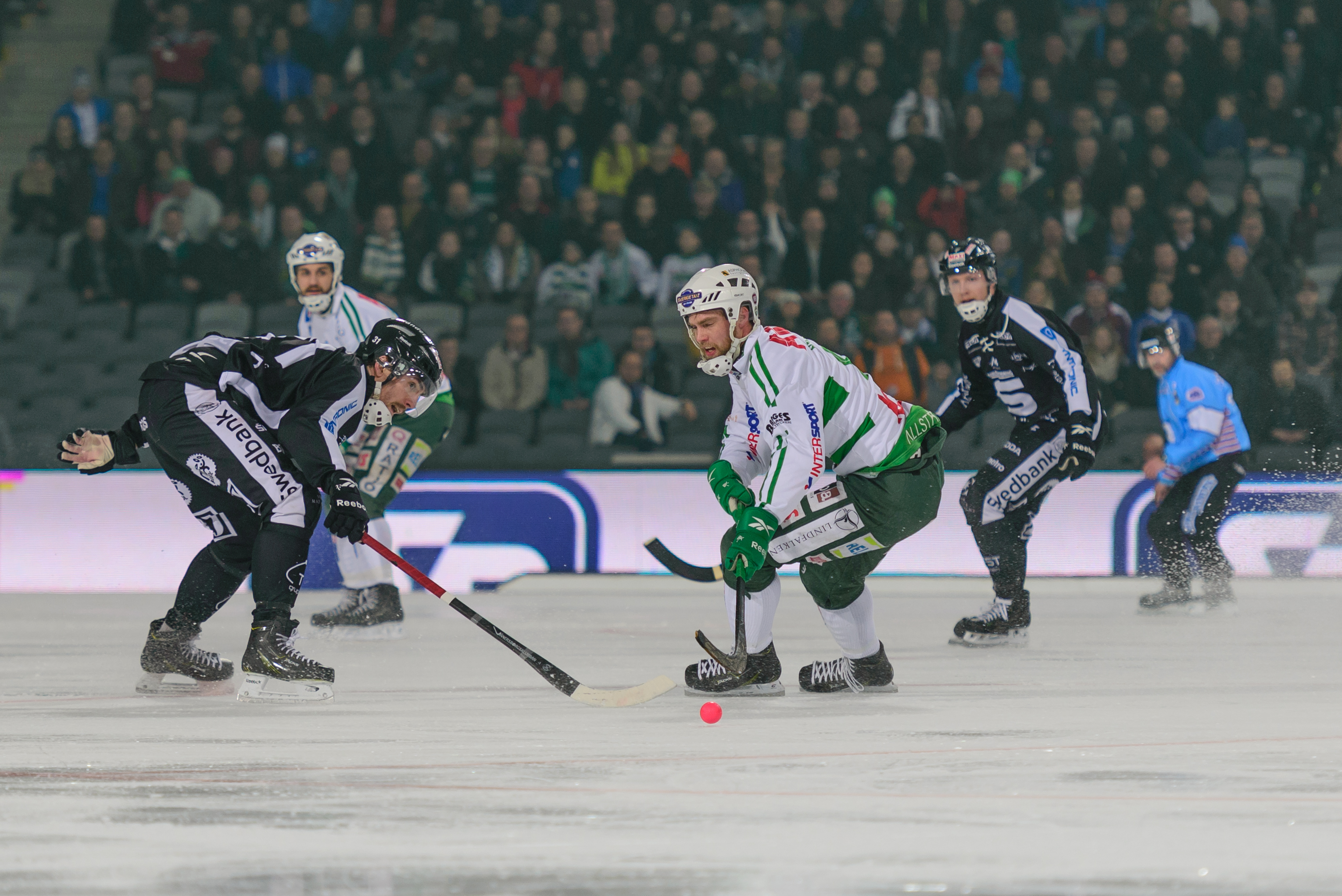
The 2015 final

| Year | Winners | Runners-up | Score | Venue | Audience |
|---|---|---|---|---|---|
| 1907 | IFK Uppsala, Uppsala | IFK Gävle, Gävle | 4–1 (2–0) | Boulogner Forest, Gävle | |
| 1908 | Djurgårdens IF, Stockholm | Östergötlands BF, Norrköping | 3–1 (1–0) | Idrottsparken, Norrköping | 100 |
| 1909 | AIK, Stockholm (Note: AIK moved to Solna in the 1930s.) | Djurgårdens IF | 7–3 (2–1) | Stockholms idrottspark, Stockholm | |
| 1910 | IFK Uppsala | IFK Stockholm, Stockholm | 2–0 (0–0) | Brunnsviken, Stockholm | |
| 1911 | IFK Uppsala | Djurgårdens IF | 6–0 (1–0) | Studenternas IP, Uppsala | |
| 1912 | IFK Uppsala and Djurgårdens IF (tie) | none | 1–1 (1–0) no replay played (Note: The spring weather made a replay impossible, so the championship title was shared) | Råsta Lake, Solna | 100 |
| 1913 | IFK Uppsala | AIK | 2–1 (1–0) | Stockholm Olympic Stadium, Stockholm | 2 000 |
| 1914 | AIK | Djurgårdens IF | 4–2 (3–1) | Stora Värtan, Stockholm | 1 800 |
| 1915 | IFK Uppsala | AIK | 2–0 (1–0) | Brunnsviken, Stockholm | 1 379 |
| 1916 | IFK Uppsala | Djurgårdens IF | 3–2 (1–1) | Stockholm Olympic Stadium, Stockholm | 2 500 |
| 1917 | IFK Uppsala | AIK | 11–2 (2–1) | Stockholm Olympic Stadium, Stockholm | 2 500 |
| 1918 | IFK Uppsala | IK Sirius, Uppsala | 2–2 (0–1); 4–1 (2–1) (replay) | Stockholm Olympic Stadium, Stockholm; Studenternas IP, Uppsala | 5 500; 2 500 |
| 1919 | IFK Uppsala | IK Göta, Stockholm | 8–2 (2–2) | Stockholm Olympic Stadium, Stockholm | 3 750 |
| 1920 | IFK Uppsala | IF Linnéa, Stockholm | 3–2 (2–1) | Stockholm Olympic Stadium, Stockholm | 2 211 |
| 1921 | IK Sirius | IFK Uppsala | 2–2 (1–0); 5–2 (3–1) (replay) | Studenternas IP, Uppsala; Stockholm Olympic Stadium, Stockholm | 3 000; 3 748 |
| 1922 | IK Sirius | Västerås SK, Västerås | 3–2 (1–0) | Stockholm Olympic Stadium, Stockholm | 6,909 |
| 1923 | Västerås SK | IF Linnéa | 2–1 (1–0) | Stockholm Olympic Stadium, Stockholm | 3,036 |
| 1924 | Västerås SK | IF Linnéa | 4–1 (4–0) | Stockholm Olympic Stadium, Stockholm | 6,780 |
| 1925 | IK Göta | Västerås SK | 7–5 (4–1) | Stockholm Olympic Stadium, Stockholm | 9,060 |
| 1926 | Västerås SK | IK Sirius | 1–0 (1–0) | Stockholm Olympic Stadium, Stockholm | 6,532 |
| 1927 | IK Göta | Västerås SK | 5–1 (2–0) | Stockholm Olympic Stadium, Stockholm | 8,856 |
| 1928 | IK Göta | IK Sirius | 5–3 (3–0) | Stockholm Olympic Stadium, Stockholm | 6,382 |
| 1929 | IK Göta | Västerås SK | 5–1 (1–1) | Stockholm Olympic Stadium, Stockholm | 5,787 |
| 1930 | SK Tirfing, Harnäs | Djurgårdens IF | 1–0 (1–0) | Stockholm Olympic Stadium, Stockholm | 3,559 |
| 1931 | AIK | IF Göta, Karlstad | 4–3 (2–1) | Stockholm Olympic Stadium, Stockholm | 9,213 |
| 1932 | IF Göta | Västerås SK | 3–2 (2–0) | Stockholm Olympic Stadium, Stockholm | 8,454 |
| 1933 | IFK Uppsala | IF Göta | 11–1 (4–0) | Stockholm Olympic Stadium, Stockholm | 9,307 |
| 1934 | Slottsbrons IF, Slottsbron | IFK Uppsala | 1–1 (0–0); 6–0 (2–0) (replay) | Stockholm Olympic Stadium, Stockholm; Sandbäckstjärnet, Karlstad | 10,748; 8,660 |
| 1935 | IF Göta | Västerås SK | 5–2 (2–1) | Tingvalla IP, Karlstad | 6,705 |
| 1936 | Slottsbrons IF | Västerås SK | 2–1 (0–1) | Stockholm Olympic Stadium, Stockholm | 11,700 |
| 1937 | IF Göta | Skutskärs IF, Skutskär | 3–2 (1–1) | Stockholm Olympic Stadium, Stockholm | 10,959 |
| 1938 | Slottsbrons IF | IFK Rättvik, Rättvik | 5–2 (2–1) | Stockholm Olympic Stadium, Stockholm | 15,186 |
| 1939 | IK Huge, Gävle | Nässjö IF, Nässjö | 5–2 (1–1) | Strömvallen, Gävle | 5,560 |
| 1940 | IK Huge | Sandvikens AIK, Sandviken | 2–1 (1–0) | Stockholm Olympic Stadium, Stockholm | 9,263 |
| 1941 | Slottsbrons IF | Sandvikens AIK | 2–1 (1–1) | Stockholm Olympic Stadium, Stockholm | 10,543 |
| 1942 | Västerås SK | Skutskärs IF | 2–1 (1–1) | Stockholm Olympic Stadium, Stockholm | 12,530 |
| 1943 | Västerås SK | Bollnäs GIF, Bollnäs | 2–2 (1–2); 3–0 (1–0) (replay) | Stockholm Olympic Stadium, Stockholm; Laduviken, Stockholm | 15,769; 6,392 |
| 1944 | Skutskärs IF | Västerås SK | 2–0 (2–0) | Stockholm Olympic Stadium, Stockholm | 20,770 |
| 1945 | Sandvikens AIK | Slottsbrons IF | 2–2 (0–0); 3–2 (a.e.t.) | Stockholm Olympic Stadium, Stockholm | 18,969 |
| 1946 | Sandvikens AIK | Västerås SK | 0–0 (0–0); 5–3 (4–2) (replay) | Stockholm Olympic Stadium, Stockholm; Stockholm Olympic Stadium, Stockholm | 20,144; 20,598 |
| 1947 | Brobergs IF, Söderhamn | Västerås SK | 4–2 (3–1) | Stockholm Olympic Stadium, Stockholm | 24,421 |
| 1948 | Västerås SK | Brobergs IF | 4–1 (2–0) | Stockholm Olympic Stadium, Stockholm | 26,617 |
| 1949 | Nässjö IF | Edsbyns IF, Edsbyn | 7–1 (2–1) | Perstorpsgölen, Eksjö (Note: This was the last time the final was played on a naturally frozen lake) | 14,809 |
| 1950 | Västerås SK | Sandvikens AIK | 2–1 (1–0) | Stockholm Olympic Stadium, Stockholm | 25,966 |
| 1951 | Bollnäs GIF | Örebro SK, Örebro | 3–2 (0–1) | Stockholm Olympic Stadium, Stockholm | 26,612 |
| 1952 | Edsbyns IF | IF Göta | 1–0 (1–0) | Stockholm Olympic Stadium, Stockholm | 25,815 |
| 1953 | Edsbyns IF | Nässjö IF | 4–4 (1–0); 5–1 (1–0) (replay) | Stockholm Olympic Stadium, Stockholm; Stockholm Olympic Stadium, Stockholm | 26,044; 19,523 |
| 1954 | Västanfors IF, Fagersta | Örebro SK | 1–1 (1–0); 2–1 (2–0) (replay) | Stockholm Olympic Stadium, Stockholm; Tunavallen, Eskilstuna | 23,744; 17,895 |
| 1955 | Örebro SK | Edsbyns IF | 7–1 (5–1) | Stockholm Olympic Stadium, Stockholm | 20,454 |
| 1956 | Bollnäs GIF | Örebro SK | 3–2 (1–1) | Stockholm Olympic Stadium, Stockholm | 20,969 |
| 1957 | Örebro SK | Hammarby IF, Stockholm | 2–1 (2–1) | Stockholm Olympic Stadium, Stockholm | 23,507 |
| 1958 | Örebro SK | Edsbyns IF | 3–1 (2–0) | Stockholm Olympic Stadium, Stockholm | 18,767 |
| 1959 | Skutskärs IF | Västerås SK | 2–1 (2–0) | Stockholm Olympic Stadium, Stockholm | 27,420 |
| 1960 | Västerås SK | IK Sirius | 3–1 (2–0) | Stockholm Olympic Stadium, Stockholm | 24,179 |
| 1961 | IK Sirius | Edsbyns IF | 3–1 (3–0) | Stockholm Olympic Stadium, Stockholm | 19,190 |
| 1962 | Edsbyns IF | IK Sirius | 3–2 (2–2) | Stockholm Olympic Stadium, Stockholm | 14,023 |
| 1963 | Brobergs IF | Edsbyns IF | 3–1 (2–0) | Stockholm Olympic Stadium, Stockholm | 10 164 |
| 1964 | Brobergs IF | Skutskärs IF | 1–1 (1–0); 4–1 (3–0) (replay) | Stockholm Olympic Stadium, Stockholm; Studenternas IP, Uppsala | 12,387; 12,379 |
| 1965 | Örebro SK | Brobergs IF | 5–2 (2–0) | Stockholm Olympic Stadium, Stockholm | 12,546 |
| 1966 | IK Sirius | Brobergs IF | 5–0 (3–0) | Studenternas IP, Uppsala | 8,682 |
| 1967 | Örebro SK | IF Göta | 3–1 (2–0) | Söderstadion, Stockholm | 10,952 |
| 1968 | IK Sirius | Örebro SK | 4–1 ( 2–1) | Söderstadion, Stockholm | 12,877 |
| 1969 | Katrineholms SK, Katrineholm | Brobergs IF | 5–1 (4–0) | Söderstadion, Stockholm | 13,072 |
| 1970 | Katrineholms SK | Ljusdals BK, Ljusdal | 6–2 (1–1) | Söderstadion, Stockholm | 10,834 |
| 1971 | Falu BS, Falun | Sandvikens AIK | 2–0 (2–0) | Söderstadion, Stockholm | 6,421 |
| 1972 | Katrineholms SK | Ljusdals BK | 2–0 (1–0) | Söderstadion, Stockholm | 14,484 |
| 1973 | Västerås SK | Örebro SK | 4–1 (2–0) | Söderstadion, Stockholm | 15,033 |
| 1974 | Falu BS | Katrineholms SK | 3–0 (2–0) | Söderstadion, Stockholm | 15,432 |
| 1975 | Ljusdals BK | Villa BK, Lidköping | 8–4 (4–0) | Söderstadion, Stockholm | 17,671 |
| 1976 | Brobergs IF | Falu BS | 6–2 (1–1) | Söderstadion, Stockholm | 13,233 |
| 1977 | Brobergs IF | Sandvikens AIK | 3–1 (1–1) | Söderstadion, Stockholm | 12,913 |
| 1978 | Edsbyns IF | Västerås SK | 6–4 (4–1) | Söderstadion, Stockholm | 16,621 |
| 1979 | IF Boltic, Karlstad | Brobergs IF | 7–4 (1–3) | Söderstadion, Stockholm | 14,128 |
| 1980 | IF Boltic | Sandvikens AIK | 5–3 (1–1) | Söderstadion, Stockholm | 14,075 |
| 1981 | IF Boltic | Selånger SK | 4–3 (2–2) | Söderstadion, Stockholm | 14,233 |
| 1982 | IF Boltic | Edsbyns IF | 3–2 (1–0) | Söderstadion, Stockholm | 13,888 |
| 1983 | IF Boltic | Villa BK | 0–0 (0–0); 5–0 (a.e.t.) | Söderstadion, Stockholm | 18,110 |
| 1984 | IF Boltic | Edsbyns IF | 2–0 (0–0) | Söderstadion, Stockholm | 14,937 |
| 1985 | IF Boltic | IFK Motala, Motala | 4–3 (3–1) | Söderstadion, Stockholm | 14,629 |
| 1986 | Vetlanda BK, Vetlanda | IF Boltic | 2–1 (2–0) | Söderstadion, Stockholm | 11,380 |
| 1987 | IFK Motala | IF Boltic | 2–2 (0–1); 3–2 (sd) | Söderstadion, Stockholm | 12,823 |
| 1988 | IF Boltic | Vetlanda BK | 5–2 (1–0) | Söderstadion, Stockholm | 10,073 |
| 1989 | Västerås SK | Vetlanda BK | 7–3 (4–1) | Söderstadion, Stockholm | 12,748 |
| 1990 | Västerås SK | Sandvikens AIK | 6–3 (4–1) | Rocklunda IP, Västerås | 14,608 |
| 1991 | Vetlanda BK | Västerås SK | 4–2 (2–2) | Studenternas IP, Uppsala | 15,855 |
| 1992 | Vetlanda BK | IF Boltic | 4–3 (3–1) | Studenternas IP, Uppsala | 12,568 |
| 1993 | Västerås SK | IF Boltic | 4–4 (1–3); 5–4 (sd) | Studenternas IP, Uppsala | 15,185 |
| 1994 | Västerås SK | Vetlanda BK | 5–2 (0–1) | Studenternas IP, Uppsala | 15,412 |
| 1995 | IF Boltic | Vetlanda BK | 2–1 (1–0) | Studenternas IP, Uppsala | 12,088 |
| 1996 | Västerås SK | Sandvikens AIK | 7–3 (3–1) | Studenternas IP, Uppsala | 17,211 |
| 1997 | Sandvikens AIK | Västerås SK | 5–4 (4–3) | Studenternas IP, Uppsala | 17,488 |
| 1998 | Västerås SK | Sandvikens AIK | 6–4 (3–1) | Studenternas IP, Uppsala | 18,027 |
| 1999 | Västerås SK | Falu BS | 3–2 (2–1) | Studenternas IP, Uppsala | 19,122 |
| 2000 | Sandvikens AIK | Hammarby IF | 8–5 (4–2) | Studenternas IP, Uppsala | 21,503 |
| 2001 | Västerås SK | Hammarby IF | 4–3 (1–2) | Studenternas IP, Uppsala | 21,542 |
| 2002 | Sandvikens AIK | Västerås SK | 8–4 (2–2) | Studenternas IP, Uppsala | 21,612 |
| 2003 | Sandvikens AIK | Hammarby IF | 6–4 (2–2) | Studenternas IP, Uppsala | 21,804 |
| 2004 | Edsbyns IF | Hammarby IF | 7–6 (2–4) | Studenternas IP, Uppsala | 22,753 |
| 2005 | Edsbyns IF | Sandvikens AIK | 6–4 (3–2) | Studenternas IP, Uppsala | 22,952 |
| 2006 | Edsbyns IF | Hammarby IF | 6–2 (3–1) | Studenternas IP, Uppsala | 23,048 |
| 2007 | Edsbyns IF | Hammarby IF | 3–3 (0–2); 4–3 (sd) | Studenternas IP, Uppsala | 21,576 |
| 2008 | Edsbyns IF | Sandvikens AIK | 11–6 (6–2) | Studenternas IP, Uppsala | 19,513 |
| 2009 | Västerås SK | Edsbyns IF | 5–4 (2–2) | Studenternas IP, Uppsala | 20,114 |
| 2010 | Hammarby IF | Bollnäs GoIF | 3–2 (1–0, 0–0, 2–0) (Note: The match was broken down into three thirds because of snowy weather) | Studenternas IP, Uppsala | 25,560 |
| 2011 | Sandvikens AIK | Bollnäs GoIF | 6–5 (3–2) (sd) | Studenternas IP, Uppsala | 19,117 |
| 2012 | Sandvikens AIK | Villa Lidköping BK | 6–5 (5–1) | Studenternas IP, Uppsala | 19,646 |
| 2013 | Hammarby IF | Sandvikens AIK | 9–4 (5–3) | Friends Arena, Solna | 38,474 |
| 2014 | Sandvikens AIK | Västerås SK | 5–4 (2–1) | Friends Arena, Solna | 20,497 |
| 2015 | Västerås SK | Sandvikens AIK | 6–4 (3–1) | Tele2 Arena, Stockholm | 15,877 |
| 2016 | Västerås SK | Villa Lidköping BK | 5–2 (1–0) | Tele2 Arena, Stockholm | 15,748 |
| 2017 | Edsbyns IF | Bollnäs GoIF | 3–1 (1–0) | Tele2 Arena, Stockholm | 16 836 |
| 2018 | Edsbyns IF | Sandvikens AIK | 4–0 (0–0) | Studenternas IP, Uppsala | 18,114 |
| 2019 | Villa Lidköping BK | Västerås SK | 8–4 (5–2) | Studenternas IP, Uppsala | 18,677 |
| 2020 | Edsbyns IF | Villa Lidköping BK | 5–1 (3–0) | Studenternas IP, Uppsala | — |
| 2021 | Villa Lidköping BK | AIK | 5–4 (2–2) (sd) | Recoverhallen, Uppsala | — |
| 2022 | Edsbyns IF | Villa Lidköping BK | 5–4 (4–3) | Studenternas IP, Uppsala | 12,649 |
| 2023 | Västerås SK | Villa Lidköping BK | 2–2 (2–1); 3–2 (sd) | Studenternas IP, Uppsala | 12,352 |
| 2024 | Villa Lidköping BK | Västerås SK | 6–6 (4–2); 7–6 (sd) | ABB Arena, Västerås | 7,262 |
| 2025 | Villa Lidköping BK | Edsbyns IF | 7–3 (5–0) | ABB Arena, Västerås | 7,321 |
| 2026 | Edsbyns IF | Villa Lidköping BK | 8–2 (4–0) | ABB Arena, Västerås | |

=== Women ===
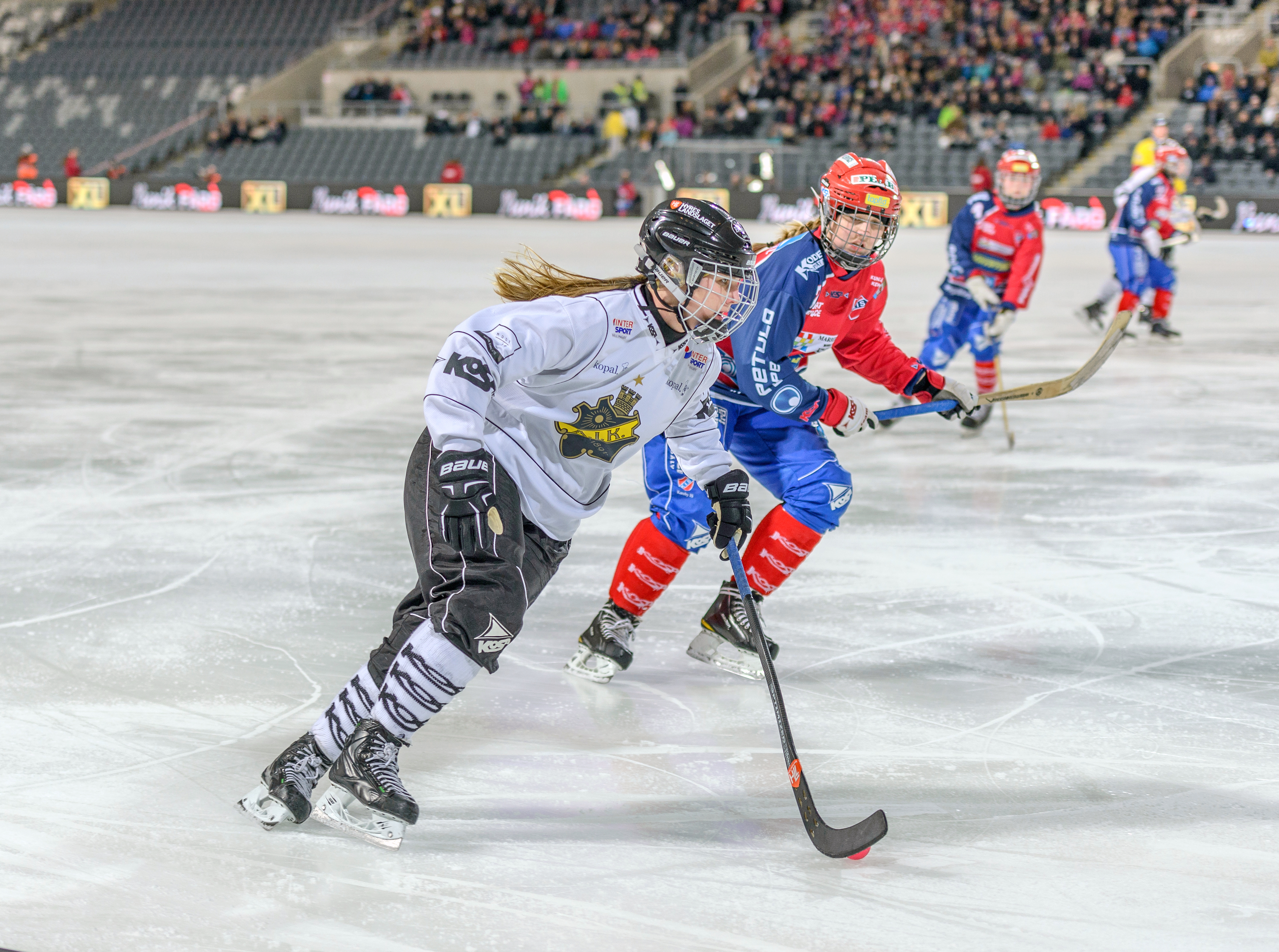
The 2015 final

| Year | Champions | Runners-up | Score | Venue | Audience |
|---|---|---|---|---|---|
| 1973 | IK Göta, Stockholm | Katrineholms SK, Katrineholm | 9–6 | Rocklunda IP, Västerås | |
| 1974 | Katrineholms SK | IK Göta | 8–2 | Söderstadion, Stockholm | |
| 1975 | Katrineholms SK | Tranås BoIS, Tranås | 8–3 | Backavallen, Katrineholm | |
| 1976 | IK Göta | Katrineholms SK | 8–3 | Backavallen, Katrineholm | |
| 1977 | IK Göta | Katrineholms SK | 7–4 | Söderstadion, Stockholm | |
| 1978 | IK Göta | Katrineholms SK | 5–4 | Söderstadion, Stockholm | 202 |
| 1979 | IK Göta | Katrineholms SK | 2–0 | Söderstadion, Stockholm | |
| 1980 | IK Göta | Edsbyns IF, Edsbyn | 9–1 | Söderstadion, Stockholm | >1,000 |
| 1981 | IK Göta | Selånger SK, Sundsvall | 12–4 | Söderstadion, Stockholm | 100 |
| 1982 | IF Boltic, Karlstad | IK Göta | 7–3 | Söderstadion, Stockholm | |
| 1983 | IK Göta | IF Boltic | 5–2 | Söderstadion, Stockholm | 500 |
| 1984 | IF Boltic | IFK Kungälv, Kungälv | 6–1 | Söderstadion, Stockholm | 322 |
| 1985 | IF Boltic | Västerstrands AIK, Karlstad | 4–2 | Söderstadion, Stockholm | |
| 1986 | IF Boltic | Stångebro BK, Linköping | 5–2 | Söderstadion, Stockholm | |
| 1987 | IF Boltic | Stångebro BK | 14–3 | Söderstadion, Stockholm | |
| 1988 | AIK, Solna | IF Boltic | 7–1 | Söderstadion, Stockholm | |
| 1989 | IF Boltic | Sandvikens AIK, Sandviken | 5–4 | Söderstadion, Stockholm | |
| 1990 | AIK | IF Boltic | 3–1 | Rocklunda IP, Västerås | 615 |
| 1991 | Västerstrands AIK | Sandvikens AIK | 9–0 | Studenternas IP, Uppsala | 1,500 |
| 1992 | Västerstrands AIK | Sandvikens AIK | 7–3 | Studenternas IP, Uppsala | 854 |
| 1993 | Sandvikens AIK | Västerstrands AIK | 6–5 a.e.t. | Studenternas IP, Uppsala | 755 |
| 1994 | Västerstrands AIK | AIK | 9–4 | Studenternas IP, Uppsala | |
| 1995 | AIK | Västerstrands AIK | 6–4 | Studenternas IP, Uppsala | 1,100 |
| 1996 | AIK | Västerstrands AIK | 5–4 | Studenternas IP, Uppsala | |
| 1997 | Västerstrands AIK | Kareby IS, Kungälv | 2–1 | Studenternas IP, Uppsala | 1,007 |
| 1998 | AIK | Kareby IS | 7–4 | Studenternas IP, Uppsala | 1,720 |
| 1999 | AIK | Kareby IS | 6–3 | Studenternas IP, Uppsala | 1,009 |
| 2000 | AIK | Västerstrands AIK | 5–4 | Studenternas IP, Uppsala | 1,200 |
| 2001 | Västerstrands AIK | AIK | 4–2 | Studenternas IP, Uppsala | 1,315 |
| 2002 | Västerstrands AIK | AIK | 7–6 SD | Studenternas IP, Uppsala | 2,089 |
| 2003 | AIK | Sandvikens AIK | 10–0 | Studenternas IP, Uppsala | 2,560 |
| 2004 | AIK | Västerstrands AIK | 4–1 | Studenternas IP, Uppsala | 3,174 |
| 2005 | AIK | Västerstrands AIK | 3–1 (1–0) | Studenternas IP, Uppsala | 3,902 |
| 2006 | AIK | Västerstrands AIK | 4–2 | Studenternas IP, Uppsala | 3,223 |
| 2007 | Sandvikens AIK | Västerstrands AIK | 5–1 | Studenternas IP, Uppsala | 1,200 |
| 2008 | AIK | IFK Nässjö, Nässjö | 3–0 | Studenternas IP, Uppsala | 1,850 |
| 2009 | IFK Nässjö | AIK | 2–1 | Studenternas IP, Uppsala | 2,735 |
| 2010 | AIK | IFK Nässjö | 5–3 | Studenternas IP, Uppsala | 1,143 |
| 2011 | Kareby IS | AIK | 3–2 (1–1) | Studenternas IP, Uppsala | 983 |
| 2012 | AIK | Sandvikens AIK | 5–4 (4–2) SD | Studenternas IP, Uppsala | 2,237 |
| 2013 | Sandvikens AIK | AIK | 4–2 (3–1) | Friends Arena, Solna | 2,216 |
| 2014 | AIK | Kareby IS | 5–1 (0–1) | Friends Arena, Solna | |
| 2015 | Kareby IS | AIK | 3–1 (3–1) | Tele2 Arena, Stockholm | |
| 2016 | Kareby IS | AIK | 3–1 (1–0) | Tele2 Arena, Stockholm | 1,114 |
| 2017 | Kareby IS | Västerås SK | 3–1 (1–0) | Tele2 Arena, Stockholm | 1 633 |
| 2018 | Skutskärs IF | AIK | 3–2 (1–1) | Studenternas IP, Uppsala | 5 198 |
| 2019 | Västerås SK | Skutskärs IF | 5–4 (2–1) PS | Studenternas IP, Uppsala | 6 478 |
| 2020 | Västerås SK | Skutskärs IF | 4–3 (1–1) | Studenternas IP, Uppsala | — |
| 2021 | Villa Lidköping BK | Västerås SK | 6–3 (3–2) | Recoverhallen, Uppsala | |
| 2022 | Villa Lidköping BK | AIK | 4–0 (2–0) | Studenternas IP, Uppsala | 4,735 |
| 2023 | Villa Lidköping BK | Västerås SK | 8–1 (3–0) | Studenternas IP, Uppsala | 2 756 |
| 2024 | Villa Lidköping BK | Västerås SK | 7–4 (4–2) | ABB Arena, Västerås | |
| 2025 | Villa Lidköping BK | Västerås SK | 7–3 (2–2) | ABB Arena, Västerås | |
| 2026 | Sandvikens AIK | Villa Lidköping BK | 6–2 (3–2) | ABB Arena, Västerås | |

== Title champions ==
=== Men's titles per club ===
| Titles | Club |
|---|---|
| 21 | Västerås SK |
| 14 | Edsbyns IF |
| 12 | IFK Uppsala |
| 9 | IF Boltic, Sandvikens AIK |
| 5 | Brobergs IF, IK Sirius, Örebro SK |
| 4 | IK Göta, Slottsbrons IF, Villa Lidköping BK |
| 3 | AIK, IF Göta, Katrineholms SK, Vetlanda BK |
| 2 | Bollnäs GoIF, Djurgårdens IF, Falu BS, Hammarby IF, IK Huge, Skutskärs IF |
| 1 | Ljusdals BK, IFK Motala, Nässjö IF, SK Tirfing, Västanfors IF |

=== Women's titles per club ===
| Titles | Club |
|---|---|
| 15 | AIK |
| 8 | IK Göta |
| 6 | Västerstrands AIK, IF Boltic |
| 4 | Kareby IS, Sandvikens AIK, Villa Lidköping BK |
| 2 | Katrineholms SK, Västerås SK |
| 1 | IFK Nässjö, Skutskärs IF |

=== Men's titles per town ===
| Titles | Town | Clubs |
|---|---|---|
| 21 | Västerås | Västerås SK |
| 17 | Uppsala | IFK Uppsala (12), IK Sirius (5) |
| 15 | Karlstad | IF Boltic (9), IF Göta (6) |
| 13 | Edsbyn | Edsbyns IF |
| 9 | Sandviken | Sandvikens AIK |
| 8 | Stockholm | AIK (3), Djurgårdens IF (2), Hammarby IF (2), IK Göta (1) |
| 5 | Örebro | Örebro SK |
| 5 | Söderhamn | Brobergs IF |
| 4 | Slottsbron | Slottsbrons IF |
| 4 | Lidköping | Villa Lidköping BK |
| 3 | Älvkarleby | Skutskärs IF (2), SK Tirfing (1) |
| 3 | Katrineholm | Katrineholms SK |
| 3 | Vetlanda | Vetlanda BK |
| 2 | Gävle | IK Huge |
| 2 | Bollnäs | Bollnäs GoIF |
| 2 | Falun | Falu BS |
| 1 | Fagersta | Västanfors IF |
| 1 | Nässjö | Nässjö IF |
| 1 | Ljusdal | Ljusdals BK |
| 1 | Motala | IFK Motala |

Notes

AIK moved from Stockholm to Solna in the 1930s, but all titles were taken before the move.

=== Women's titles per town ===
| Titles | Town | Club | |
|---|---|---|---|
| 15 | Solna | AIK | |
| 12 | Karlstad | Västerstrands AIK (6), IF Boltic (6) | |
| 8 | Stockholm | IK Göta | |
| 4 | Kareby | Kareby IS, Lidköping | Villa Lidköping BK |
| 3 | Sandviken | Sandvikens AIK | |
| 2 | Katrineholm | Katrineholms SK | |
| 2 | Västerås | Västerås SK | |
| 1 | Nässjö | IFK Nässjö | |

=== Men's and women's titles the same year ===
| Years | Club |
|---|---|
| 3 | IF Boltic (1982, 1984, 1985) |
| 2 | Villa Lidköping BK (2021, 2024) |
