= Kovlands IF =

Swedish football club

- Full name: Kovlands Idrottsförening
- Founded: 1903
- Ground: Ånäsvallen; Kovland; Sweden
- Chairman: Rickard Persson
- League: Division 4 Medelpad
Home colours	Away colours

Kovlands IF is a Swedish football club located in Kovland.

== Background ==
Kovlands IF currently plays in Division 4 Medelpad which is the sixth tier of Swedish football. They play their home matches at the Ånäsvallen in Kovland.

The club is affiliated to Medelpads Fotbollförbund.

== Season to season ==
Season	Level	Division	Section	Position	Movements
2004	Tier 5	Division 4	Medelpad	12th	Relegated
2005	Tier 6	Division 5	Medelpad	8th	
2006*	Tier 7	Division 5	Medelpad	2nd	Promoted
2007	Tier 6	Division 4	Medelpad	11th	Relegated
2008	Tier 7	Division 5	Medelpad	7th	
2009	Tier 7	Division 5	Medelpad	10th	
2010	Tier 7	Division 5	Medelpad	1st	Promoted
2011	Tier 6	Division 4	Medelpad		

* League restructuring in 2006 resulted in a new division being created at Tier 3 and subsequent divisions dropping a level.
