= Trud Stadium (Arkhangelsk) =

Sports venue in Arkhangelsk, Russia

Coordinates: 64.5571°N 40.5307°E

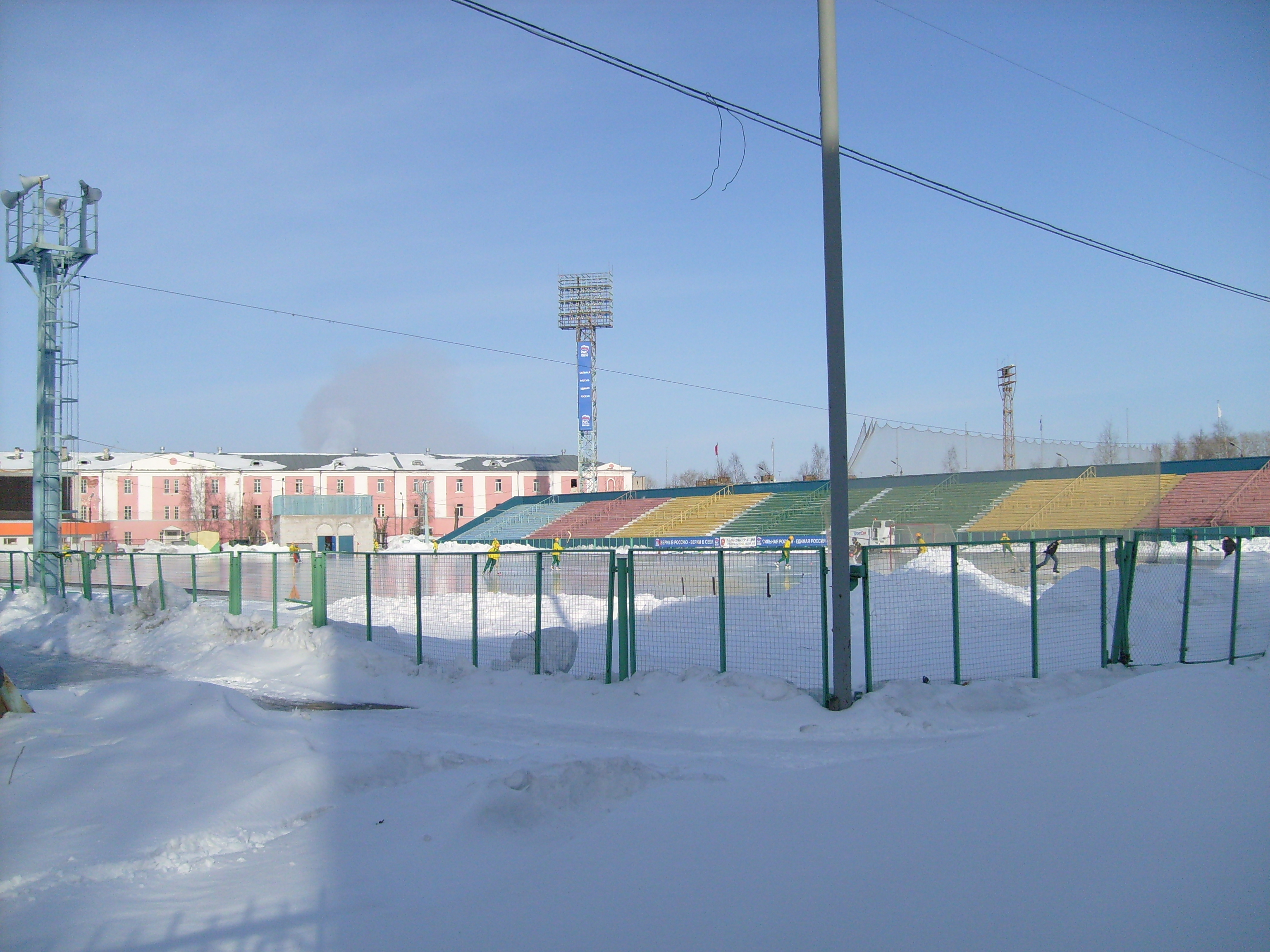
- Interactive map of Trud Stadium
- Location: Arkhangelsk, Russia
- Capacity: 10,000

Construction
- Opened: 1973

Tenant
- Vodnik

Trud Stadium is a sports venue in Arkhangelsk. It is the home stadium of bandy club Vodnik and has hosted the Bandy World Championship twice. The venue is used mostly for bandy and association football.

Events and tenants
Preceded by Rocklunda IP; Västerås	Bandy World Championship; Final Venue; 1999	Succeeded by Raksilan tekojää Oulu
Preceded by Raksilan tekojää Oulu	Bandy World Championship; Final Venue; 2003	Succeeded by Rocklunda IP; Västerås
