= Kareby =

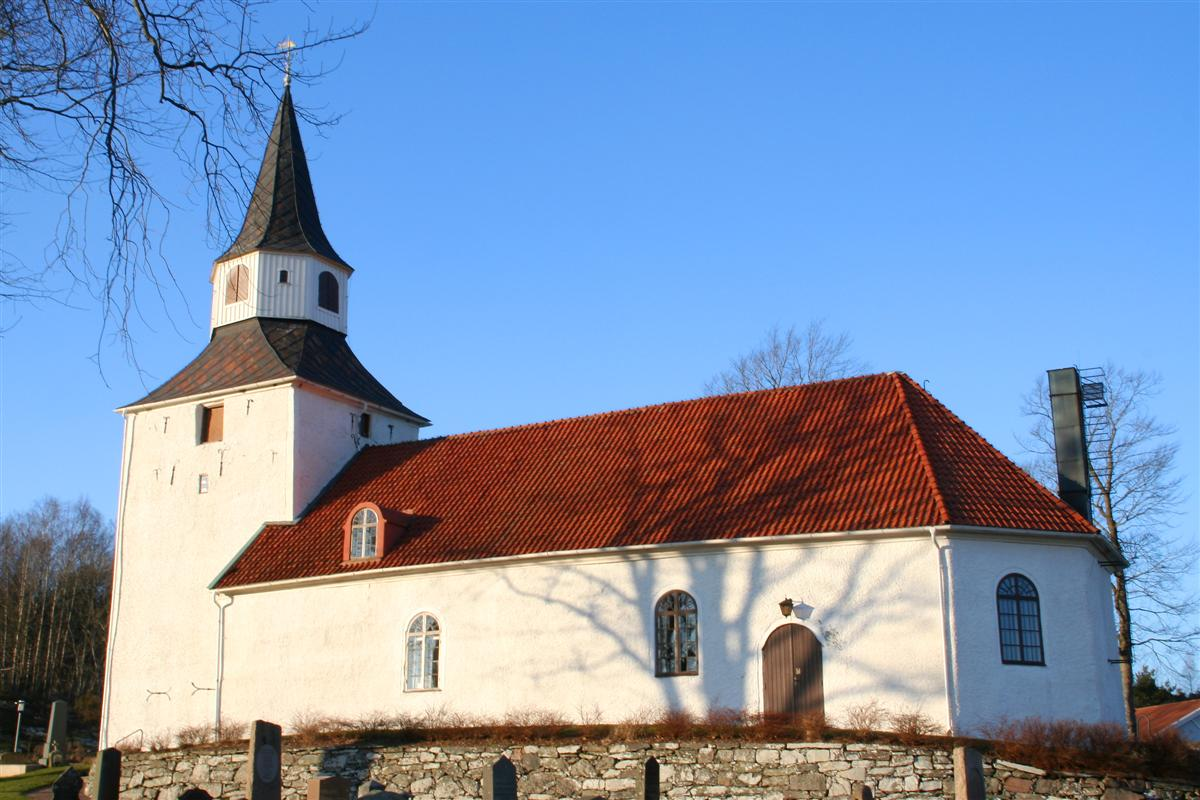
- Kareby Church

- Location within Västra Götaland Location within Sweden
- Coordinates: 57°55′N 11°54′E
- Country: Sweden
- Province: Bohuslän
- County: Västra Götaland County
- Municipality: Kungälv Municipality

Area
  - Total: 0.27 km^{2} (0.10 sq mi)

Population (31 December 2010)
  - Total: 292
  - Density: 1,072/km^{2} (2,780/sq mi)
- Time zone: UTC+1 (CET)
  - Summer (DST): UTC+2 (CEST)

Kareby is a locality situated in Kungälv Municipality, Västra Götaland County, Sweden. It had 292 inhabitants in 2010. Kareby IS have four sports on the programme and is reigning Swedish bandy champions for women (2016).
