= IFK Stockholm Bandy =

Bandy club in Stockholm, Sweden

IFK Stockholm Bandy was the bandy team of IFK Stockholm from Stockholm, Sweden. They lost the final of the 1910 Swedish Championship to IFK Uppsala with 2–0.

== Honours ==
=== Domestic ===
- Swedish Champions:
  - Runners-up (1): 1910
