= Derby/Linköping BK =

- City: Linköping, Sweden
- League: Division 1
- Division: Mellersta
- Founded: 1981; 45 years ago

Derby/Linköping Bandyklubb, Derby/Linköping BK, colloquially Derby, is a bandy club in Linköping, Sweden. It has its roots in BK Derby but was formally founded on 1 October 1981, when the bandy department of BK Derby was merged with Stångebro/Cupol BK and formed Derby/Stångebro BK. In 1983 the name was changed to Stångebro BK. In 2003, the club returned to the name Derby, forming an alliance with the football club of that name, and returned to the green-black jerseys and the BK Derby logo.

Stångebro BK was the runner-up to the Swedish championship for women's bandy teams in 1986 and 1987.

The men's team used to play bandy in Allsvenskan, the second-tier of Swedish bandy, but chose to withdraw after the 2007/2008 season. In 2014, it is playing in the third-tier Division 1 Södra (South).
