= Recoverhallen =

Indoor bandy venue in Uppsala, Sweden

Coordinates: 59.8805°N 17.6594°E

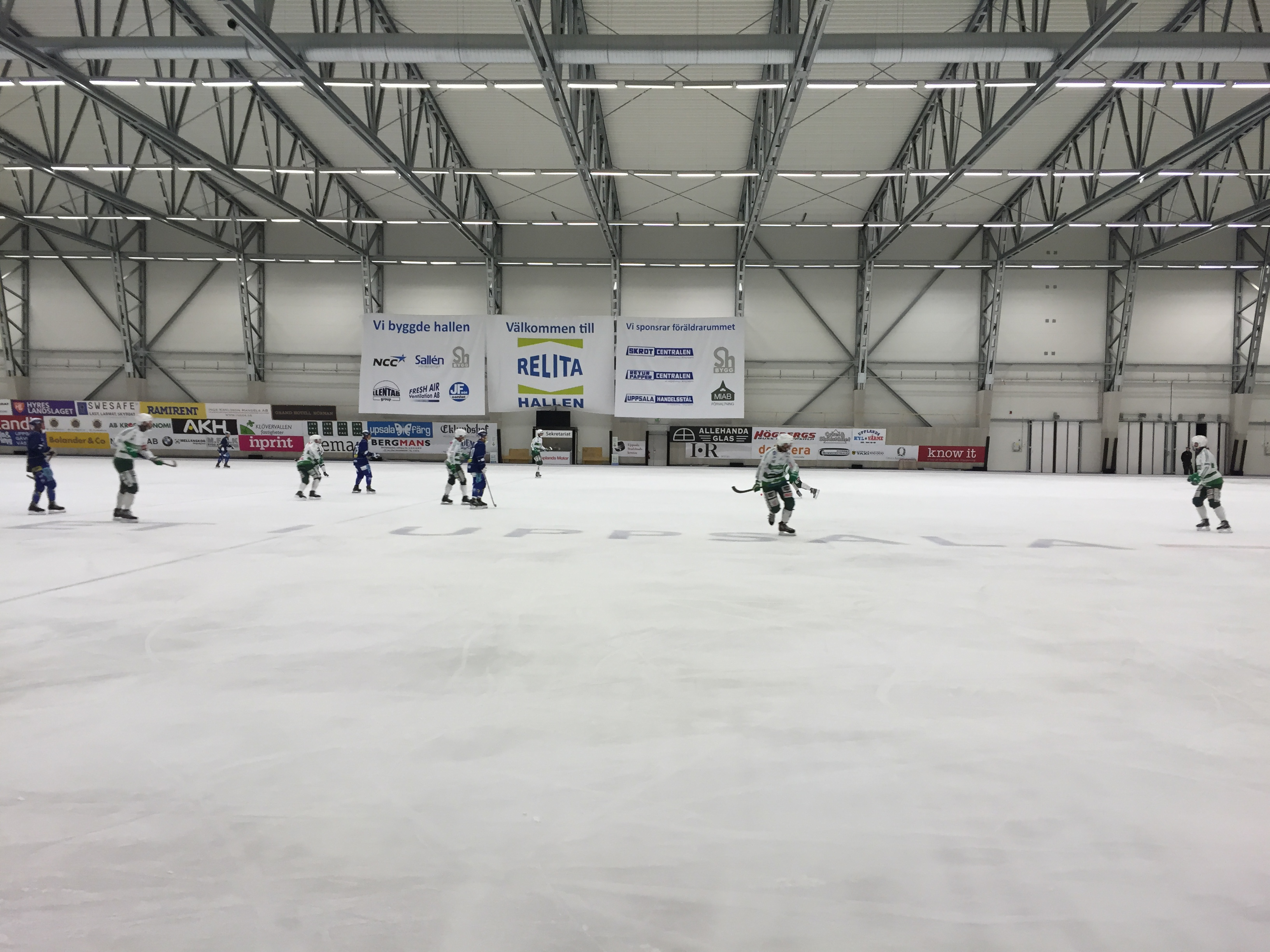
- Interior in September 2015
- Interactive map of Recoverhallen
- Former names: Relitahallen
- Location: Uppsala, Sweden
- Type: indoor bandy venue

Construction
- Opened: 11 September 2011

Tenants
- IK Sirius; WT Bandy; Uppsala BOIS; UNIK

Recoverhallen (former Relitahallen) is an indoor bandy venue in Uppsala, Sweden, opened on 11 September 2011 with the game IK Sirius–Yenisey Krasnoyarsk 5–4.

On 6 and 7 September 2013, double international games between Sweden and Finland with both A- and U23 games were held inside.

In March and April 2021, the Swedish Bandy Championship final games for both women and men was played inside the arena.
