= Zlatan Muslimović =

Bosnian former professional footballer (born 1981)

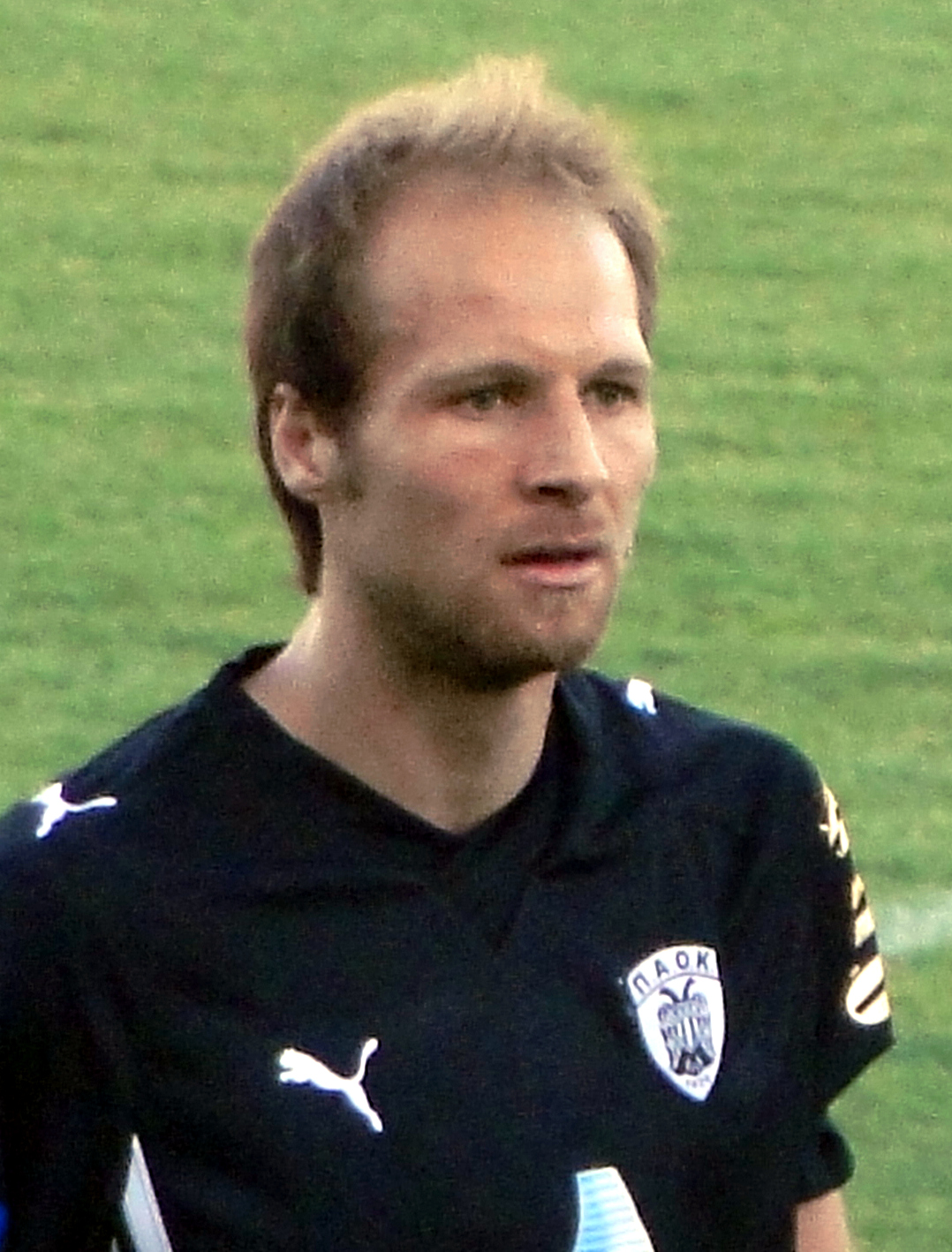
- Muslimović playing for PAOK in May 2010

Personal information
- Date of birth: 6 March 1981 (age 45)
- Place of birth: Banja Luka, SFR Yugoslavia
- Height: 1.89 m (6 ft 2 1/2 in)
- Position: Forward

Youth career
- Habo IF
- Husqvarna FF
- IFK Göteborg
- Udinese

Senior career*
Years	Team	Apps	(Gls)
2000–2007	Udinese	2	(0)
2001–2002	→ Perugia (loan)	0	(0)
2002	→ Pistoiese (loan)	8	(1)
2002–2003	→ Ascoli (loan)	11	(0)
2003–2004	→ Padova (loan)	30	(6)
2004–2005	→ Rimini (loan)	32	(15)
2005–2006	→ Messina (loan)	25	(4)
2006–2007	→ Parma (loan)	29	(3)
2007–2008	Atalanta	10	(2)
2008–2011	PAOK	70	(17)
2012–2014	Guizhou Renhe	56	(17)
2015	Zavrč	10	(1)
2016–2017	Koper	21	(2)
Total		304	(68)

International career
2001–2002	Bosnia and Herzegovina U21	4	(3)
2006–2011	Bosnia and Herzegovina	30	(11)
- * Club domestic league appearances and goals

Zlatan Muslimović (Bosnian pronunciation: [zlǎtan muslǐːmoʋitɕ]; born 6 March 1981) is a Bosnian former professional footballer who played as a forward.

== Early career ==
As a teenager, Muslimović played for the Swedish teams Habo IF and Husqvarna FF. He went on to play for the Swedish team IFK Göteborg youth team in 1998 and 1999, before coming to Italy in 2000.

Muslimović was also a goalkeeper for the Brandstorps IF floorball club's team for boys' born in 1981 during the 1994–95 season.

== Club career ==
=== Italy ===
Muslimović signed his first professional contract with Udinese. During the 2004–05 season, he was the top scorer of Serie C1/A side Rimini, with 15 goals in 32 matches, helping his team in winning the league and being promoted to Serie B. In 2006–07 he was loaned to Parma. In June 2007, he signed for Serie A side Atalanta (in a direct swap with Marco Motta) but suffered from lack of playing time under head coach Luigi Delneri.

=== PAOK ===
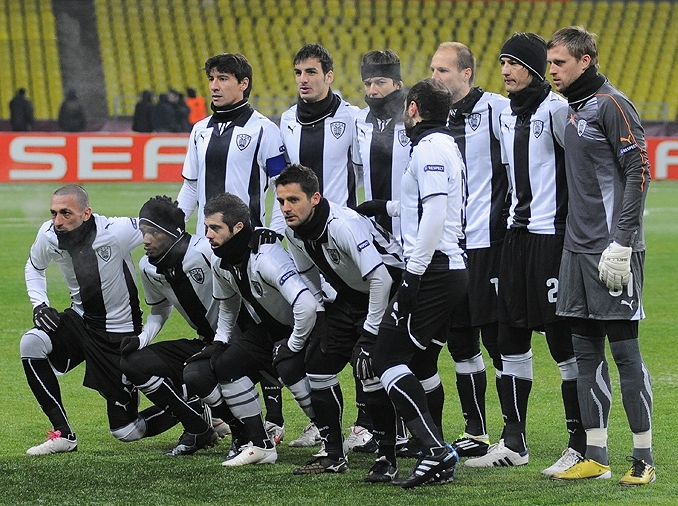
Muslimović playing for PAOK F.C. in UEFA Europa League against CSKA Moscow in 2011

On 22 July 2008, Muslimović signed with Greek club PAOK on a three-year deal. He instantly became a fan favourite and largely contributed to PAOK's successful run in the 2008–09 season. He scored his first goal for PAOK in a friendly against Udinese and his first league goal in a home game against AEK Athens. He received the nickname "Alani" by the Gate 4 fans.

During the 2009–10 season, however, he began facing many injury problems and managed to score only four times while his playing time kept diminishing. His most memorable goal was in the 2010–11 UEFA Europa League play-offs, when he netted a 101st minute 1–1 equalizer against Fenerbahçe, sending PAOK through to the group stages. After another disappointing season, however, it was decided that his contract would not be renewed; his last official game for PAOK was against Olympiacos Volos on 25 May 2011, where he also scored.

=== Guizhou Renhe ===
On 20 February 2012, after being without a club for nine months, Muslimović signed with Chinese Super League side Guizhou Renhe. On 8 April, scored his first goal for the senior Guizhou Renhe side.

== International career ==
Muslimović has made 30 appearances for the Bosnia and Herzegovina national team since making his debut in August 2006 in a friendly match against France as a second-half substitute. He also played for the team in their UEFA Euro 2008 qualifying matches against Malta (twice), Hungary, Norway and Turkey. Against Croatia, he scored a hat-trick.

One of Muslimović's most memorable games was the encounter with Norway in Oslo. He and midfielder Zvjezdan Misimović scored early goals in the first half giving Bosnia a night to remember on 24 March 2007 with a 2–1 victory. He turned in another solid performance in the match against Turkey by slotting home a pass from Misimović past Rüştü Reçber to level the score at 1–1. Bosnia went on to win the game 3–2 with 89th-minute substitute Adnan Čustović heading in from a corner.

Muslimović is one of only six national players (with Elvir Bolić, Elvir Baljić [who scored four goals in one game], Zvjezdan Misimović, Vedad Ibišević and Edin Džeko) to ever score a hat-trick for Bosnia, doing so during a friendly against Croatia.

In the qualifying rounds for the 2010 FIFA World Cup in South Africa in November 2009, Bosnia was eliminated by Portugal; Muslimović's shot hit the goalpost during the match in Lisbon.

His final international was a September 2011 European Championship qualification match away against Belarus.

== Career statistics ==
=== Club ===
Appearances and goals by club, season and competition
Club	Season	League			Cup		Continental		Other		Total	
Club	Season	Division	Apps	Goals	Apps	Goals	Apps	Goals	Apps	Goals	Apps	Goals
Udinese	2000–01	Serie A	2	0	0	0	—		—		2	0
Perugia (loan)	2001–02	Serie A	0	0	1	0	—		—		1	0
Pistoiese (loan)	2001–02	Serie B	8	1	0	0	—		—		8	1
Ascoli (loan)	2002–03	Serie B	11	0	1	0	—		—		12	0
Padova (loan)	2003–04	Serie C	30	6	0	0	—		—		30	6
Rimini (loan)	2004–05	Serie C	32	15	3	2	—		2	3	37	20
Messina (loan)	2005–06	Serie A	25	4	0	0	—		—		25	4
Parma (loan)	2006–07	Serie A	29	3	3	2	3	0	—		35	5
Atalanta	2007–08	Serie A	10	2	0	0	—		—		10	2
PAOK	2008–09	Super League Greece	25	7	4	0	—		—		29	7
PAOK	2009–10	Super League Greece	24	8	1	0	3	1	—		28	9
PAOK	2010–11	Super League Greece	21	2	4	0	7	2	—		32	4
PAOK	Total		70	17	9	0	10	3	—		89	20
Guizhou Renhe	2012	Chinese Super League	28	13	5	1	—		—		33	14
Guizhou Renhe	2013	Chinese Super League	23	4	6	3	6	1	—		35	8
Guizhou Renhe	2014	Chinese Super League	5	0	0	0	1	0	1	1	7	1
Guizhou Renhe	Total		56	17	11	4	7	1	1	1	75	23
Zavrč	2015–16	Slovenian PrvaLiga	10	1	1	0	—		—		11	1
Koper	2015–16	Slovenian PrvaLiga	7	0	0	0	—		—		7	0
Koper	2016–17	Slovenian PrvaLiga	14	2	1	0	—		—		15	2
Koper	Total		21	2	1	0	—		—		22	2
Career total			304	68	30	8	20	4	3	4	357	84

=== International ===
Appearances and goals by national team and year
National team	Year	Apps	Goals
Bosnia and Herzegovina
Bosnia and Herzegovina	2006	2	1
Bosnia and Herzegovina	2007	8	6
Bosnia and Herzegovina	2008	4	3
Bosnia and Herzegovina	2009	5	1
Bosnia and Herzegovina	2010	5	0
Bosnia and Herzegovina	2011	6	0
Total		30	11

Scores and results list Bosnia and Herzegovina's goal tally first, score column indicates score after each Muslimović goal.

List of international goals scored by Zlatan Muslimović
Goal	Date	Venue	Opponent	Score	Result	Competition
1	2 September 2006	Ta' Qali Stadium, Ta' Qali	Malta	4–1	5–2	UEFA Euro 2008 qualifying
2	24 March 2007	Ullevaal Stadion, Oslo	Norway	2–0	2–1	UEFA Euro 2008 qualifying
3	2 June 2007	Asim Ferhatović Hase Stadium, Sarajevo	Turkey	1–1	3–2	UEFA Euro 2008 qualifying
4	6 June 2007	Asim Ferhatović Hase Stadium, Sarajevo	Malta	1–0	1–0	UEFA Euro 2008 qualifying
5	22 August 2007	Asim Ferhatović Hase Stadium, Sarajevo	Croatia	1–2	3–5	Friendly
6	22 August 2007	Asim Ferhatović Hase Stadium, Sarajevo	Croatia	2–2	3–5	Friendly
7	22 August 2007	Asim Ferhatović Hase Stadium, Sarajevo	Croatia	3–4	3–5	Friendly
8	10 September 2008	Bilino Polje, Zenica	Estonia	4–0	7–0	2010 FIFA World Cup qualification
9	15 October 2008	Bilino Polje, Zenica	Armenia	3–0	4–1	2010 FIFA World Cup qualification
10	15 October 2008	Bilino Polje, Zenica	Armenia	4–1	4–1	2010 FIFA World Cup qualification
11	5 September 2009	Hanrapetakan Stadium, Yerevan	Armenia	2–0	2–0	2010 FIFA World Cup qualification

== Honours ==
Rimini

- Serie C1: 2004–05
- Supercoppa di Serie C: 2005

PAOK

- Super League Greece: runner-up 2009–10

Guizhou Renhe

- Chinese FA Cup: 2013
- Chinese FA Super Cup: 2014
