= Skarpe Nord =

Ice skating rink in Kungälv, Sweden

Coordinates: 57.8667°N 11.9727°E

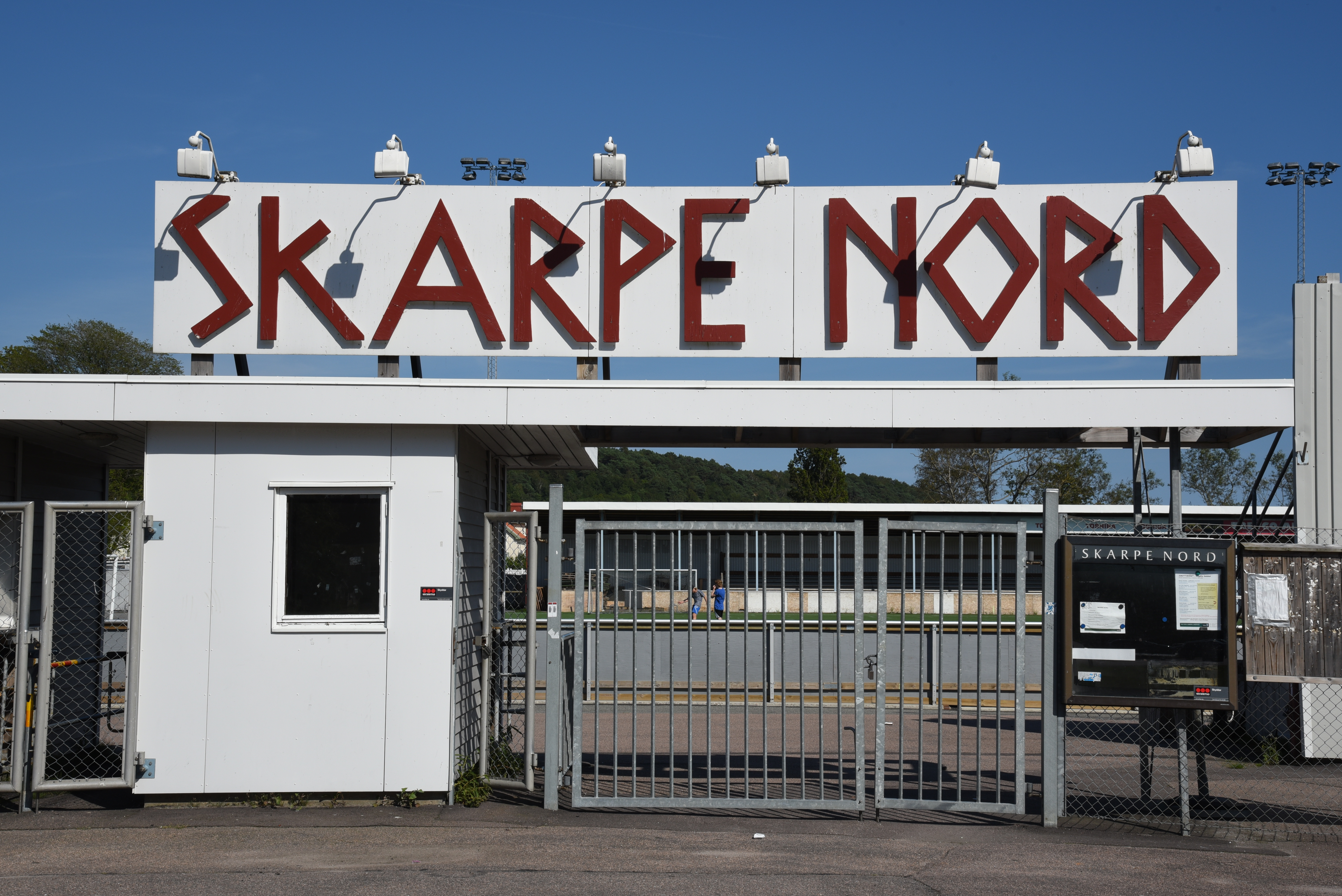
- Interactive map of Skarpe Nord
- Location: Kungälv, Sweden
- Capacity: 3,500

Construction
- Opened: 1965

Tenant
- IFK Kungälv

Skarpe Nord is an ice skating rink in Kungälv. It is the home of IFK Kungälv, Kareby IS, and Kungälvs SK. It is open to the public in the winter, when it is cold and there is ice on the rink.
