= Luvsjön =

Lake in Katrineholm Municipality, Sweden

- Location within Södermanland
- Location: Katrineholm Municipality
- Coordinates: 58°59′41″N 16°09′09″E
- Basin countries: Sweden

Luvsjön is a lake in Katrineholm, Södermanland, Sweden.
