= Selångersån =

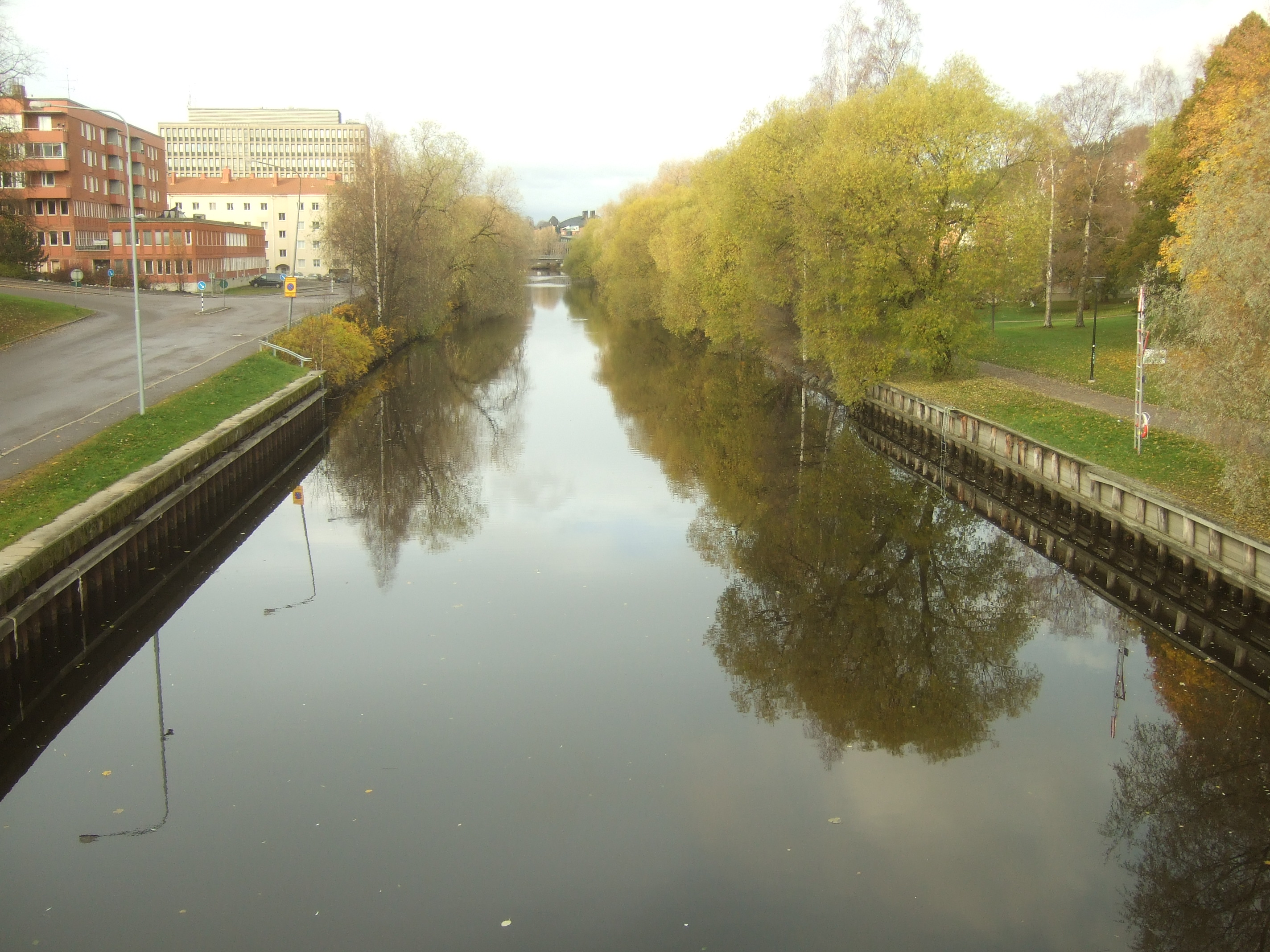

Location
- Country: Sweden
- County: Västernorrland

Physical characteristics
- Mouth
  - location: Sundsvall
  - coordinates: 62°23′35″N 17°18′54″E
- Basin size: 459.8 km^{2} (177.5 sq mi)

Selångersån is a river in Sweden, running through Selånger.
