= Selånger SK Bandy =

Bandy team in Sundsvall, Sweden

Selånger SK
- City: Sundsvall, Sweden
- League: Division 1
- Division: Övre Norrland
- Founded: 1921; 104 years ago
- Home arena: Gärdehov

Selånger SK Bandy is a bandy club in Sundsvall, Sweden, and part of the sports club alliance Selånger SK. It has its name from the small village of Selånger outside Sundsvall proper.

Selånger SK was founded in 1921 and has had many sports under its umbrella, of which bandy has been one of the most successful. The men's bandy team has played 26 seasons in the Swedish top division and was runner-up for the Swedish Championship in 1981. The women's bandy team was runner-up for the Swedish Championship in 1981.

The present club was formally founded in 1991, when Selånger SK was divided in different clubs for the different sports: Selånger SK Bandy, Selånger FK, and Selånger SOK, which all share the same name and logo. Selånger SK Bandy continues the traditions and statistics of the bandy department of Selånger SK. It presently play in Division 1, which is the third tier of Swedish bandy.

The club logo is based on the arms of Västernorrland County.

== Honours ==
=== Domestic ===
- Swedish Champions:
  - Runners-up (1): 1981

=== International ===
- World Cup:
  - Runners-up (1): 1988
