= Helenelunds IK =

- City: Sollentuna, Sweden
- League: Division 1
- Division: Östra
- Founded: 1928; 97 years ago
- Home arena: Sollentunavallen

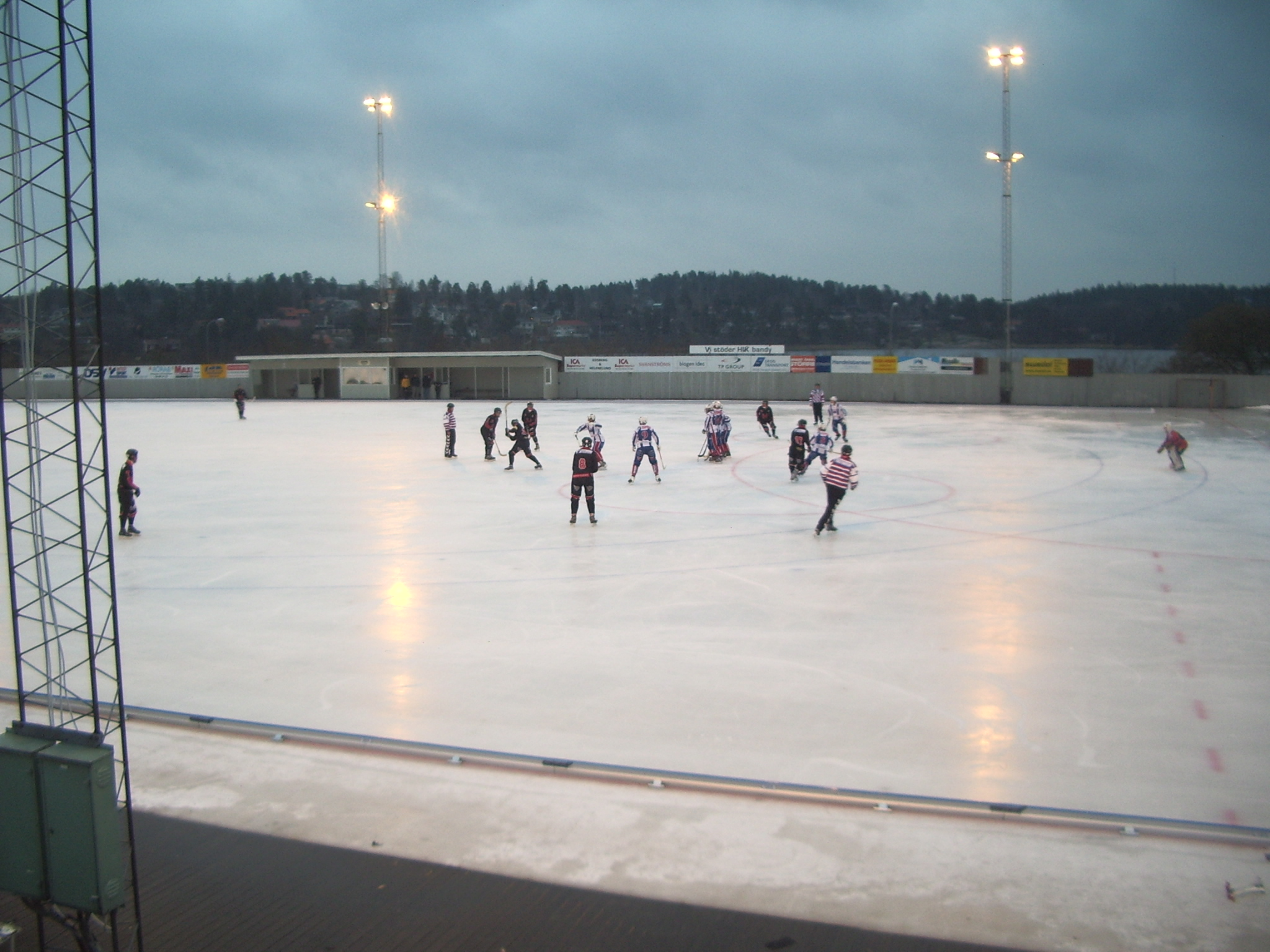
Bandy match between Helenelund and Katrineholm in Allsvenskan, at the Helenelund home ice Sollentunavallen, season 2008/2009.

Helenelunds Idrottsklubb, Helenelunds IK, HIK, is a sports club in Sollentuna, Sweden. The team colours are black, white and red. The club was founded in 1928 and is today most well known for its bandy team.

Helenelunds home arena is Sollentunavallen, located next to the inlet Edsviken.

The club was originally called Idrottsklubben Stjärnan (Sports Club Star) but changed to its present name as early as its second year, 1929. In the 1980s and 1990s, the club played for qualification to the Swedish top-tier in bandy many times, was close sometimes but never quite made it.

The club played in Allsvenskan, the second-level bandy league in Sweden, until 2009 when it was relegated to Division 1.

The sports club's soccer team, Helenelunds IK Fotboll, merged in 2008 with Sollentuna soccer team IFK Sollentuna and formed Sollentuna Fotboll IF (today called Sollentuna FK).
