= Västerås SK Bandy (women) =

Västerås SK
- City: Västerås, Sweden
- League: Allsvenskan
- Founded: 1904; 121 years ago
- Home arena: ABB Arena
- Website: www.vskbandy.se
Home colours	Away colours

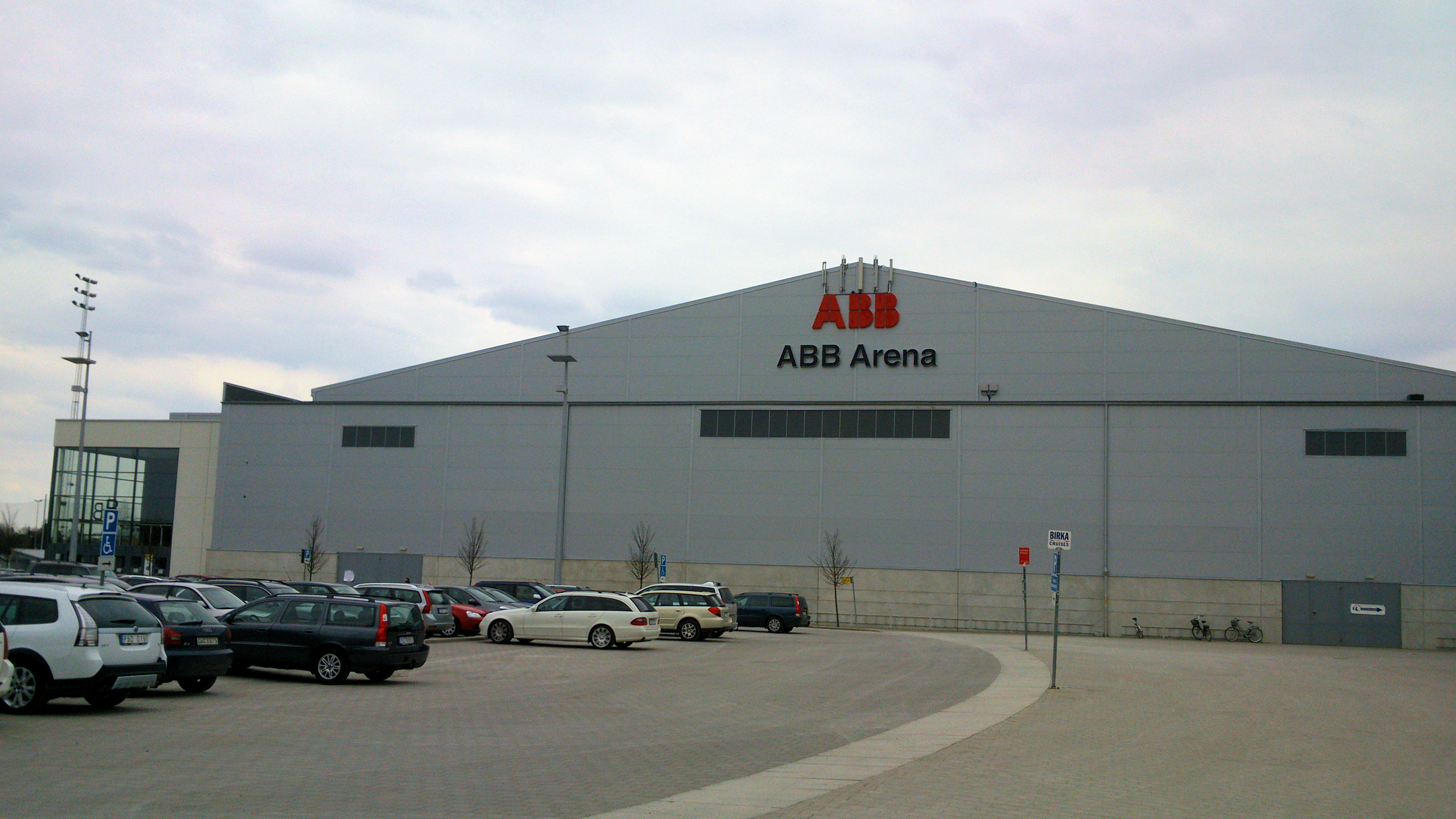
ABB Arena Syd in Västerås, Sweden. Home ground for Västerås SK.

Västerås SK Bandy is the women's bandy side of the Swedish sports club Västerås SK, located in Västerås. The senior side currently plays in the Swedish Allsvenskan, the top-tier league of Swedish women's bandy, and has done so for a number of years. The club was the runner-up for the Swedish Championship in 2017.

== History ==
The main club Västerås SK was founded on 29 January 1904. The women's bandy team plays its matches in the indoor ABB Arena South. The men's side is Västerås SK Bandy.

In March 2019, the Västerås SK women's bandy team won its first Swedish championship title by defeating Skutskärs IF, 5–3, in the final game following overtime and penalty shootout.

In October 2019 the team won the first women's edition of the Swedish women's bandy national cup competition by defeating Skutskärs IF, med 4–2, in the final game. Later the same month the team also won the World Cup by winning the final game, once again defeating Skutskärs IF, 5–0.

In March 2020, Västerås SK won its second national championship title, defeating Skutskärs IF, 4–3 following two goals by Charlotte Selbekk.

The third Swedish championship title was won in March 2025, when Västerås SK defeated Villa Lidköping BK, 7–3, on home ice inside the ABB Arena.
