= Rocklunda IP =

Sports venue in Rocklunda, Västerås, Sweden

- Interactive map of Rocklunda IP
- Address: Västerås; Sweden
- Location: Rocklunda
- Coordinates: 59.634°N 16.526°E
- Type: sports ground

Tenants
- Västerås SK Bandy; Tillberga IK; VIK Hockey; Västerås SK Fotboll; Västerås IB; IVH Västerås HK

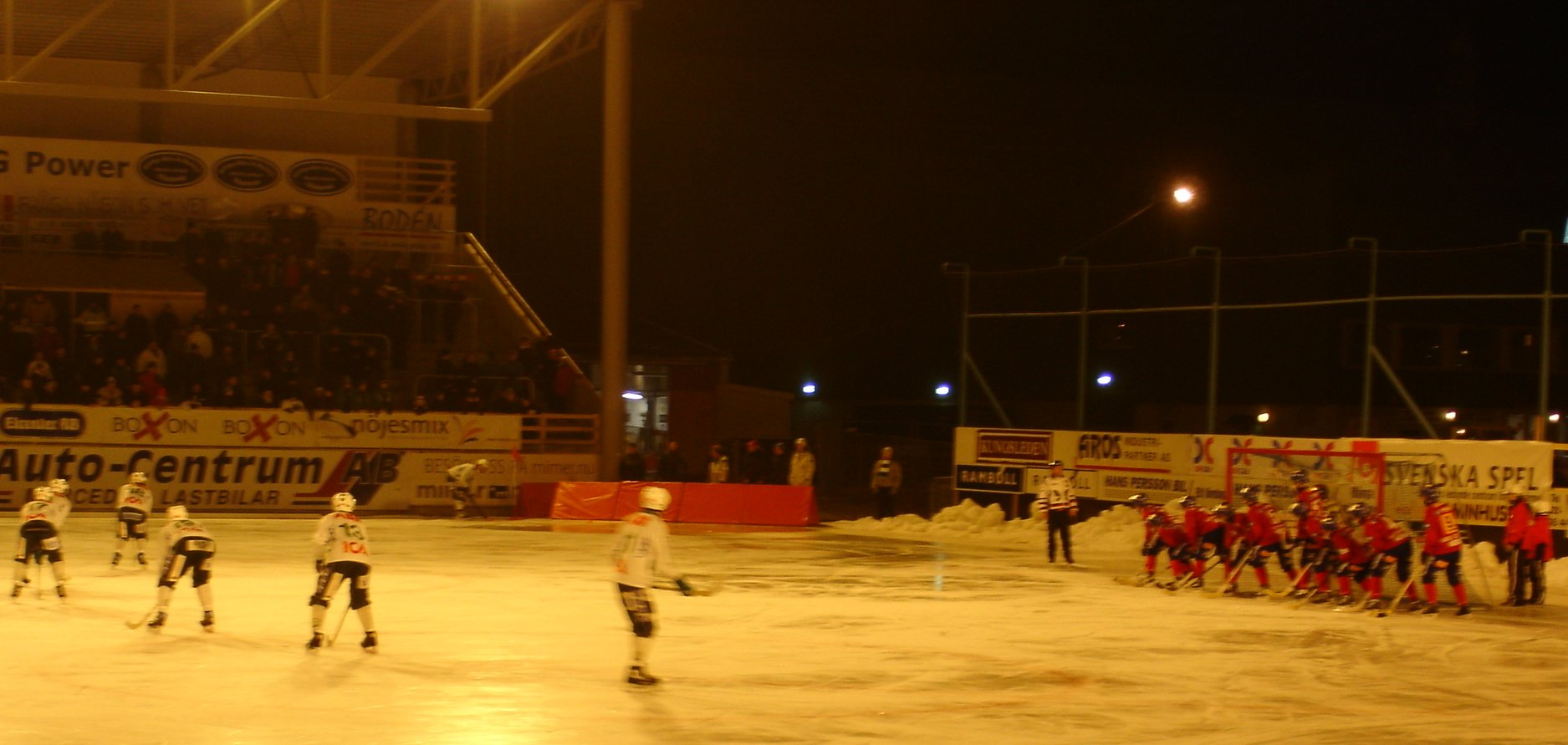
A men's bandy Elitserien game played at Rocklunda IP between Västerås SK and Edsbyns IF in January 2007.

Rocklunda IP is a sports venue in Rocklunda in Västerås, Sweden. It consists of venues for soccer, bandy, track and field athletics, ice hockey, baseball and American football. Bandy is currently played inside ABB Arena.

The 1990 Swedish Bandy Championship final was played at Rocklunda IP.

Events and tenants
Preceded by John Rose Minnesota Oval; Roseville	Bandy World Championship; Final Venue; 1997	Succeeded by Trud Stadium; Arkhangelsk
Preceded by Trud Stadium; Arkhangelsk	Bandy World Championship; Final Venue; 2004	Succeeded by Trudovye Rezervy Stadium; Kazan
