= Trudovye Rezervy Stadium (Kazan) =

Sports arena in Kazan, Russia

Coordinates: 55°47′44.8″N 49°9′13.1″E

Trudovye Rezervy Stadium is a sports arena in Kazan, Russia, used for association football and bandy. It is also used for recreational skating.

It was used by the Socceroos, the Australian national team, as their training base for the 2018 FIFA World Cup.

== See also ==
- Trudovye Rezervy

Events and tenants
Preceded by Rocklunda IP; Västerås	Bandy World Championship; Final Venue; 2005	Succeeded by Zinkensdamms IP; Stockholm
Preceded by Ice Palace Krylatskoye; Moscow	Bandy World Championship; Final Venue; 2011	Succeeded by Medeu; Almaty
