= IFK Nässjö =

Sports club in Nässjö, Sweden

- Full name: Idrottsföreningen kamraterna Nässjö
- Sport: bandy
- Founded: 1924
- Based in: Nässjö, Sweden
- Stadium: Skogsvallen
- Championships: 1 (women's bandy, 2008)

IFK Nässjö is a sports club in Nässjö, Sweden, established in 1924. The men's bandy team played in the 1944 qualifying rounds for the Swedish top division, before being disestablished in 1968.

The women's bandy section was started in 2004, taking over Nässjö IF's women's bandy team. The IFK Nässjö women's bandy team won the Swedish national championship in 2009, and lost the national final in 2008 and 2010. All three final games were played against AIK. The U-17 girls' bandy team also won the Swedish national championship during the seasons of 2004-2005 and 2005–2006.

The club was appointed "IFK club of the year 2006" on 18 August 2007.

On 23 August 2011 the club announced its withdrawal from the Swedish women's bandy top division following lack of players.
