= Västerstrands AIK =

Sports club in Karlstad, Sweden

- Full name: Västerstrands allmänna idrottsklubb
- Sport: bandy
- Founded: 11 October 1940
- Based in: Karlstad, Sweden
- Ballpark: Tingvalla isstadion
- Championships: 6 (women's bandy, 1991, 1992, 1994, 1997, 2001, 2002)

Västerstrands AIK is a sports club in Karlstad, Sweden. The club was founded on 11 October 1940 and currently only runs a women's bandy team.

The women's bandy team has won the Swedish national championship six times, in 1991, 1992, 1994, 1997, 2001, and 2002, the same number of times as local competitor IF Boltic, and has also been the runner-up a couple of times. The team colours are black and yellow.
