= Selånger FK =

Swedish football club

- Full name: Selånger Fotbollklubb
- Founded: 1921
- Ground: Selånger IP; Sundsvall; Sweden
- Chairman: Anders Wiklander
- Head coach: Anders Högman
- Coach: Mikael Andersson
- League: Division 6 Medelpad
- 2016: Division 6 Medelpad, 7th
Home colours

Selånger FK is a Swedish football club located in Selånger in Västernorrland County. It is a part of the alliance club Selånger SK. Their most acclaimed player is Vilma Abrahamsson.

== Background ==
Selånger Fotbollklubb was founded in 1921 as Selånger Sportklubb (Selånger SK). Selånger SK had departments for a number of sports, but in 1991 it was split up in a number of clubs which however still cooperate in an alliance and share the same logo. Apart from Selånger FK, these are Selånger SK Bandy and Selånger SOK.

The football club are now one of the biggest clubs in Västernorrland with 650 members. They run 23 league teams and also provide a football school for children of 5–7 years of age.

Since their foundation Selånger FK has participated mainly in the middle and lower divisions of the Swedish football league system. The club currently plays in Division 1 Norrla which is the third tier of Swedish football. They play their home matches at Norrporten Arena in Sundsvall. The club manages the facility themselves which at the moment has seven grass pitches and a building with changing rooms and a cafeteria.

Selånger FK are affiliated to the Medelpads Fotbollförbund.

== Season to season ==
Season	Level	Division	Section	Position	Movements
1993	Tier 5	Division 4	Medelpad	5th	Våren (Spring)
	Tier 5	Division 4	Medelpad	1st	Kvalfyran (Autumn) – Promoted
1994	Tier 4	Division 3	Mellersta Norrland	4th	
1995	Tier 4	Division 3	Mellersta Norrland	4th	
1996	Tier 4	Division 3	Mellersta Norrland	6th	
1997	Tier 4	Division 3	Mellersta Norrland	1st	Promoted
1998	Tier 3	Division 2	Norrland	3rd	
1999	Tier 3	Division 2	Norrland	2nd	
2000	Tier 3	Division 2	Norrland	7th	
2001	Tier 3	Division 2	Norrland	8th	Withdrew at end of season
2002	Tier 5	Division 4	Medelpad	2nd	
2003	Tier 5	Division 4	Medelpad	10th	
2004	Tier 5	Division 4	Medelpad	7th	
2005	Tier 5	Division 4	Medelpad	2nd	Promotion Playoffs
2006*	Tier 6	Division 4	Medelpad	1st	Promotion Playoffs – Promoted
2007	Tier 5	Division 3	Mellersta Norrland	10th	Relegated
2008	Tier 6	Division 4	Medelpad	1st	Promoted
2009	Tier 5	Division 3	Mellersta Norrland	3rd	
2010	Tier 5	Division 3	Mellersta Norrland	4th	
2011	Tier 5	Division 3	Södra Norrland	1st	Promoted
2012	Tier 4	Division 2	Norrland	1st	Promoted
2013	Tier 3	Division 1	Norra	13th	Relegated
2014	Tier 4	Division 2	Norrland	11th	
2015	Tier 4	Division 2	Norrland	7th	Withdrew at end of season
2016	Tier 8	Division 6	Medelpad	7th	
2017	Tier 8	Division 6	Medelpad		

* League restructuring in 2006 resulted in a new division being created at Tier 3 and subsequent divisions dropping a level.

== Attendances ==
In recent seasons Selånger FK have had the following average attendances:

Season	Average attendance	Division / Section	Level
2006	Not available	Div 4 Medelpad	Tier 6
2007	66	Div 3 Mellersta Norrland	Tier 5
2008	Not available	Div 4 Medelpad	Tier 6
2009	157	Div 3 Mellersta Norrland	Tier 5
2010	127	Div 3 Mellersta Norrland	Tier 5
2011	104	Div 3 Södra Norrland	Tier 5
2012	147	Div 2 Norrland	Tier 4

* Attendances are provided in the Publikliga sections of the Svenska Fotbollförbundet website.

The attendance record for Selånger FK was 350 spectators at the local derby match against Sund IF in 2011 (Division 3 Södra Norrland).

== Combined Clubs ==
- (Malaysia) Selangor FA
