= Selånger SK =

Swedish sports club

- Full name: Selånger sportklubb
- Sport: bandy, soccer, Nordic skiing, orienteering, ski orienteering table tennis cycling, track and field athletics, racewalking, handball, figure skating (earlier)
- Founded: 1921
- Based in: Sundsvall, Sweden
- Arena: Gärdehov, Norrporten Arena

Selånger SK is a sports club in Sundsvall, Sweden, established in 1921. The club runs bandy, soccer, Nordic skiing, orienteering and ski orienteering, earlier even table tennis, cycling, track and field athletics, racewalking, handball and figure skating.

The men's bandy team has played 26 seasons in the Swedish top division and was runner-up for the Swedish Championship in 1981. The women's bandy team was runner-up for the Swedish Championship in 1981.

Following a decision taken during an extra annual meeting on 19 June 1991, the club became an alliance club starting on 1 October the same year. it consists of three sections: Selånger SK Bandy, Selånger FK and Selånger SOK. Famous skiers who have competed for the club are Sven Selånger, Anna-Lisa Eriksson and Arja Hannus.
