= Katrineholms SK Bandy =

Katrineholms SK
- City: Katrineholm, Sweden
- Founded: 5 January 1919
- Folded: 30 June 2007
- Home arena: Backavallen

Katrineholms SK or KSK Bandy was a sports club in Katrineholm, Sweden, playing bandy.

The club was founded on 5 January 1919 and won the Swedish Bandy Championship for men three times, 1969, 1970 and 1972. and for women in 1974 and 1975. Home games were played at Backavallen.

In June 2007 the club was dissolved by amalgamating with Värmbol-Katrineholm BK, forming the new club Katrineholm Värmbol BS. The name Katrineholms SK is still used in association football.

== Honours ==
=== Domestic ===
- Swedish Champions:
  - Winners (3): 1969, 1970, 1972
  - Runners-up (1): 1974
