= Gärdehov =

Sports venue in Sweden

Coordinates: 62°24′41″N 17°20′58″E

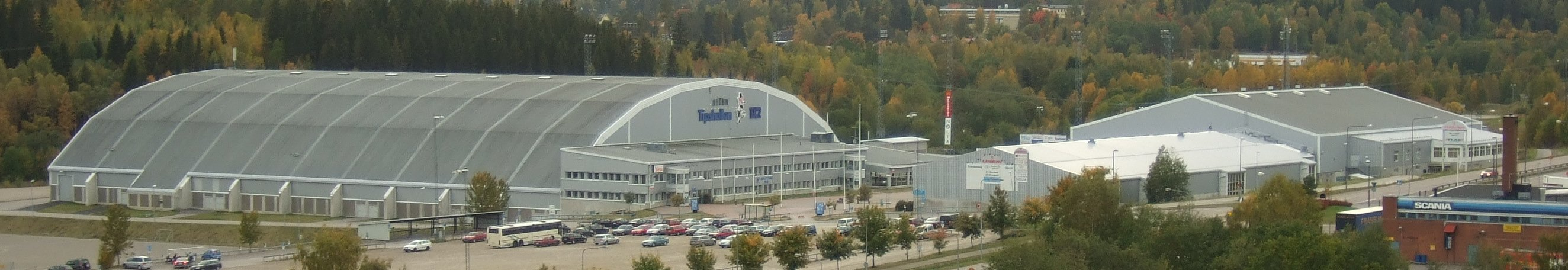
- Gärdehov
- Interactive map of Gärdehov
- Location: Sundsvall, Sweden
- Type: indoor arena

Construction
- Opened: 1966

Tenant
- IF Sundsvall Hockey

Gärdehov is an indoor arena located in Sundsvall, Sweden, and built in 1966. The ice hockey arena has a capacity of 2,500 spectators (previously 3,300) since the renovation of the arena in summer 2009, and is IF Sundsvall Hockey's home arena.

The arena also holds a bandy field, which is used for home games by Selånger SK Bandy.
