= Katrineholm =

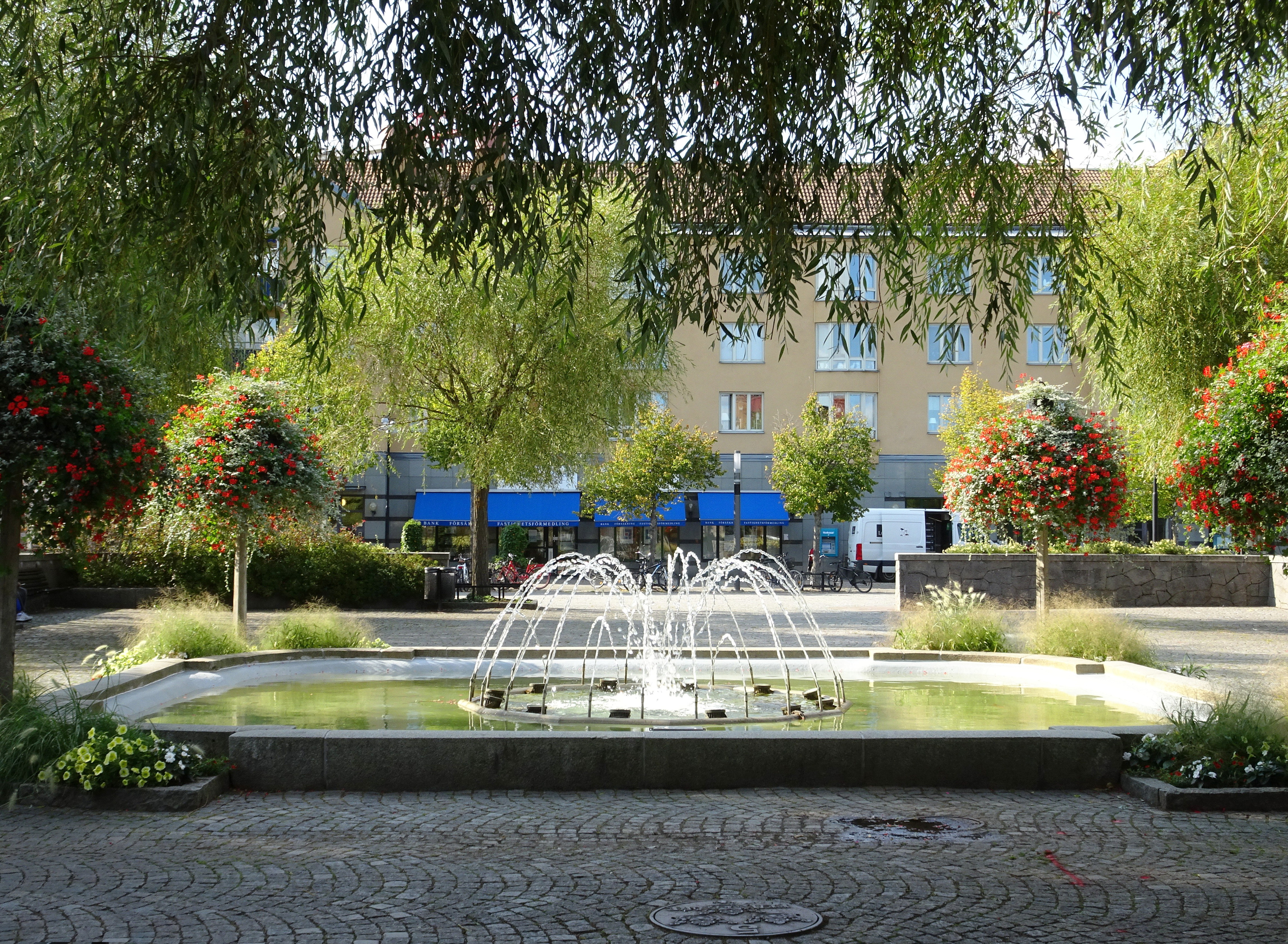
- Katrineholm "Stora torget"

- Location within Södermanland Location within Sweden
- Coordinates: 59°00′N 16°12′E
- Country: Sweden
- Province: Södermanland
- County: Södermanland County
- Municipality: Katrineholm Municipality

Area
  - Total: 11.46 km^{2} (4.42 sq mi)

Population (31 December 2020)
  - Total: 24,483
  - Density: 2,136/km^{2} (5,533/sq mi)
- Time zone: UTC+1 (CET)
  - Summer (DST): UTC+2 (CEST)
- Climate: Dfb

Katrineholm (pronunciation: extended or shortened) is a locality and the seat of Katrineholm Municipality, Södermanland County, Sweden with 24,271 inhabitants in 2018. It is located in the inland of Södermanland and is the third largest urban area in the county after Eskilstuna and county seat Nyköping.

== History ==
=== Early history ===
The name Katrineholm comes from a ducal residence with this name, after Catherina Gyllenhorn who lived there. The settlement started growing when it became a railway junction connecting the railways Stockholm - Gothenburg), and Stockholm - Malmö. In 1917 it had a population of 6,000 and in 1971 became the seat of Katrineholm Municipality.

=== Today ===
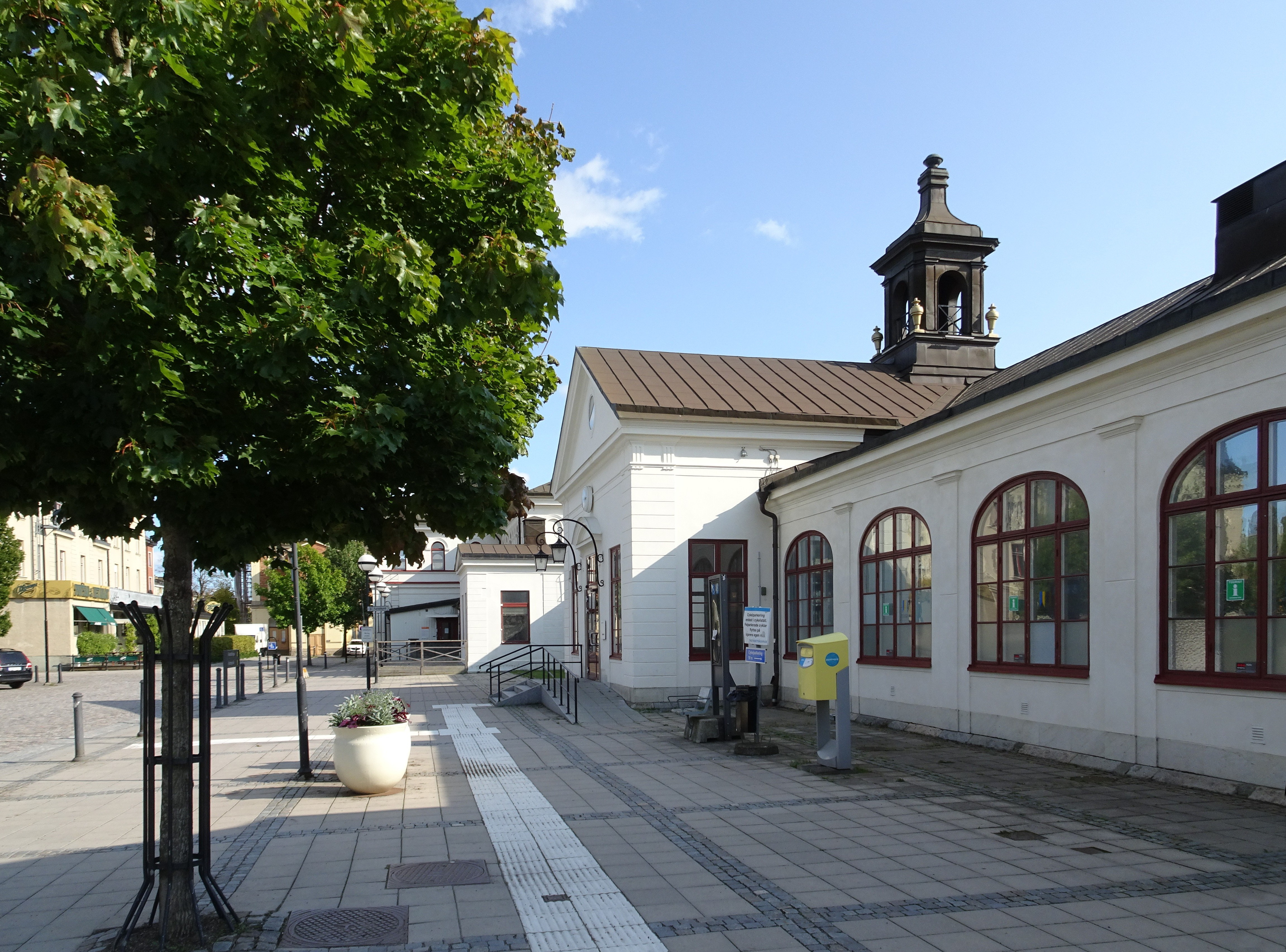
Katrineholm railway station.

Katrineholm used to have a strong industrial sector, with several multinational corporations such as Ericsson and Scania contributing to its economy, but in the 1990s some of these companies reduced their workforce in Katrineholm. Today, many residents work elsewhere, particularly in Stockholm, as the train connection between Katrineholm and other major cities is fast and comfortable.

During the 1970s and 1980s the town bandy team was one of the best in the Swedish national league, winning the league 1969, 1970 and 1972. The Federation of International Bandy has an office in Katrineholm.

The 1985 movie On the loose, featuring the Hard Rock band Europe has its history set in Katrineholm.

== Geography ==
=== Lakes ===
- Luvsjön

== Sports ==
The following sports clubs are or have been located in Katrineholm:

- Värmbols FC
- Katrineholms SK Bandy
- Katrineholms SK Fotboll
- Katrineholms AIK

== Notable natives and residents ==
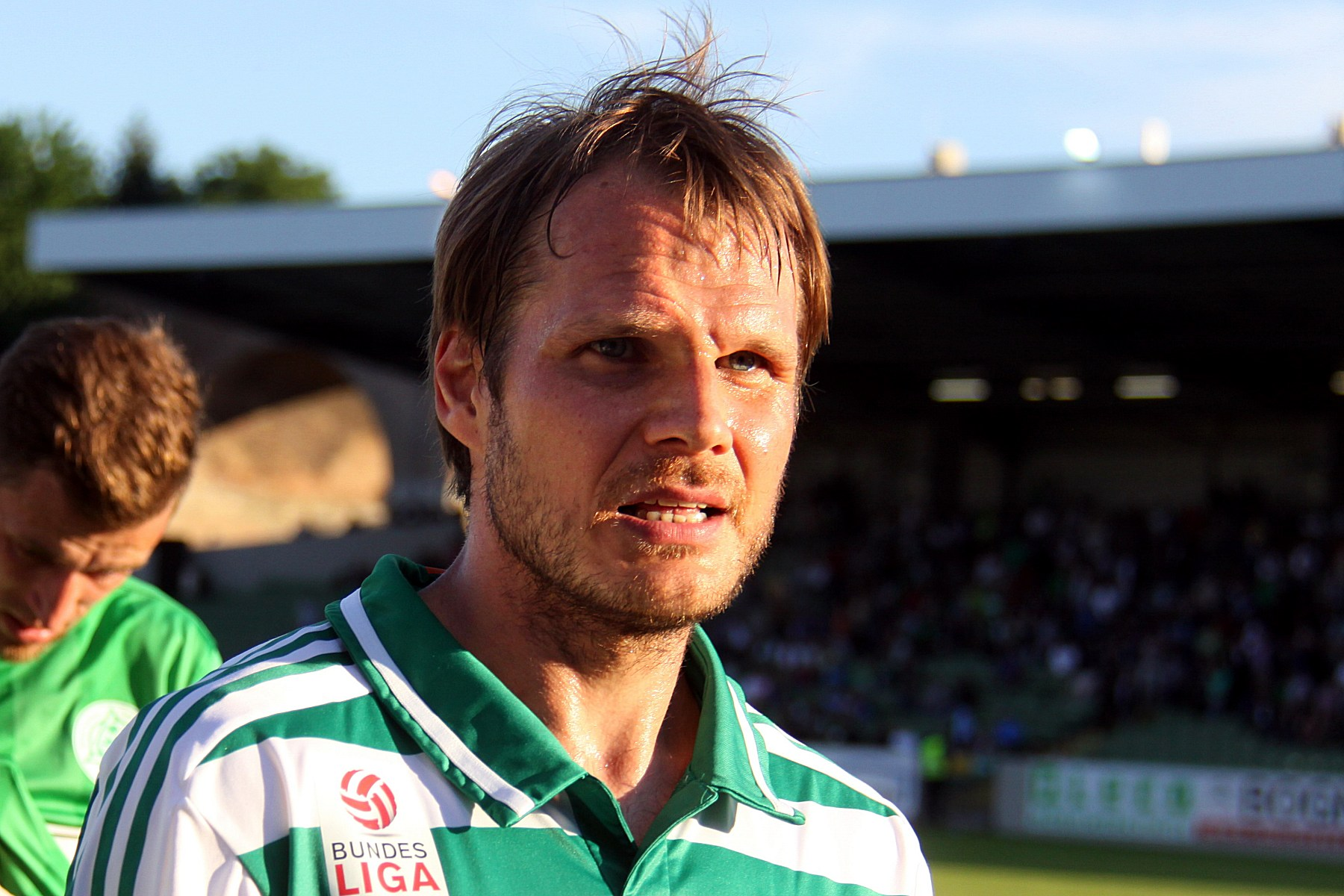
Markus Heikkinen, former Finnish footballer

- Kerstin Ekman (author)
- Adhesive (Punk rock band)
- Anders Lindström (band member of The Hellacopters)
- Anette Olzon (musician)
- Erik Hassle (musician)
- Hedvig Lindahl (football goalkeeper)
- Lars Lagerbäck (football coach)
- Markus Heikkinen (footballer)
- P. C. Jersild (author)
- Robert Gustafsson (actor & comedian)
- Robert Karlsson (golfer)
- Susanne Gunnarsson (canoeist)
- Tomas Gustafson (speed skater)
- Klas Dahlbeck (ice hockey player)
- Sebastian Samuelsson (biathlete)
- William Karlsson (racing driver)
