= Matfors =

- Location within Västernorrland Location within Sweden
- Coordinates: 62°21′N 17°02′E
- Country: Sweden
- Province: Medelpad
- County: Västernorrland County
- Municipality: Sundsvall Municipality

Area
  - Total: 3.25 km^{2} (1.25 sq mi)

Population (31 December 2010)
  - Total: 3,201
  - Density: 986/km^{2} (2,550/sq mi)
- Time zone: UTC+1 (CET)
  - Summer (DST): UTC+2 (CEST)

Matfors is a locality situated in Sundsvall Municipality, Västernorrland County, Sweden with 3,201 inhabitants in 2010.

The river Ljungan runs through Matfors. It is situated about 15 kilometers west of Sundsvall, a city with about 45,000 inhabitants. In Matfors there used to be two schools: Sköle Skola and Matfors Skola, both sharing the same school yard; they later rejoined to form Matfors Skola in 2009 after being split up in 2002.

Matfors is said to have got its name from the rich supply of salmon (Swedish: lax) in the river Ljungan, by which the town was built. The name Matfors consists of two parts: mat (food) and fors (river stream).

Matfors was for some time its own community/municipality (Swedish: kommun) but then first merged with Attmar and later Sundsvall (beginning of the 1970s). The town of Matfors was for a long time of less importance than the town of Lucksta in the two adjacent parishes of Attmar and Tuna, until the Matfors-bridge was built across the river Ljungan. Later on a sawmill and a papermill were built together with several other minor industries which increased the town's importance towards dominating the area.

The papermill was closed in 1990, at the time owned by SCA, and the original main building now hosts about 20 small businesses. The Matfors area as a whole is home to many small businesses, but many residents also commute to the neighbouring town of Sundsvall. A mid-sized business located in Matfors is SBL Vaccin, a subsidiary of Active Biotech.

Matfors has the following urban districts:

Vattjom
Ängom
Runsvik
Solhöjden
Tallskogen
Ljungan, both a district and a river Ljungan, running through Matfors.
Centrum,
Sköle
Kvällsjön
Storjorden
Bällsta
Åsta
Fors
Lunde
Rännö

Reliable communications are provided by the European route E14.

Some organizations in Matfors with their own web-sites:

- Tuna Hembygsförening - native district org. with photo of E14 exit towards Matfors
- Matfors Idrottsförening - soccer
- Matfors Badmintonklubb - badminton
- Matfors Vattenskidklubb - waterski
- Matfors Modellflygklubb - model airplane
- Matfors Skoterklubb - snow mobile
- Matfors Brukshundklubb - dogs
- Matfors Sportfiske Klubb - fishing
- Matfors Jaktskytteklubb - hunting/shooting
- Matfors Ryttarförening - horseriding

== Sports ==
The following sports clubs are located in Matfors:

- Matfors IF
- Matfors SK
