= Essvik =

- Location within Västernorrland Location within Sweden
- Coordinates: 62°19′N 17°24′E
- Country: Sweden
- Province: Medelpad
- County: Västernorrland County
- Municipality: Sundsvall Municipality

Area
  - Total: 1.19 km^{2} (0.46 sq mi)

Population (31 December 2010)
  - Total: 752
  - Density: 632/km^{2} (1,640/sq mi)
- Time zone: UTC+1 (CET)
  - Summer (DST): UTC+2 (CEST)
- Climate: Dfc

Essvik is a locality situated in Sundsvall Municipality, Västernorrland County, Sweden with 752 inhabitants in 2010.

It is located about halfway between Sundsvall (to the north), and Njurundabommen (to the south). The mill that inevitably started the growth of the town, was founded by Johan Nordling in the late 19th century to early 1910s.
