= Gustavsberg =

Gustavsberg may refer to:

- Gustavsberg, Sundsvall Municipality, an urban area in Sundsvall Municipality, Sweden
- Gustavsberg, Värmdö Municipality, an urban area and seat of Värmdö Municipality, Sweden
  - Gustavsberg porcelain, produced in Värmdö
