= Sølvhøj =

Sølvhøj is a Danish surname.

== List of people with the surname ==
- Hans Sølvhøj (1919–1989), Danish politician
- Jakob Sølvhøj (born 1954), Danish politician

== See also ==
- Solhöjden
