= Ljustorps IF =

Swedish football club

- Full name: Ljustorps Idrottsförening
- Ground: Ljustorps IP; Ljustorp, Sweden
- Coach: Fredrik Enqvist
- League: Division 6 Medelpad
Home colours	Away colours

Ljustorps IF is a Swedish football club located in Ljustorp.

== Background ==
Ljustorps IF currently plays in Division 4 Medelpad which is the sixth tier of Swedish football. They play their home matches at the Ljustorps IP in Ljustorp.

The club is affiliated to Medelpads Fotbollförbund.

== Season to season ==
Season	Level	Division	Section	Position	Movements
2005	Tier 5	Division 4	Medelpad	10th	
2006*	Tier 6	Division 4	Medelpad	8th	
2007	Tier 6	Division 4	Medelpad	7th	
2008	Tier 6	Division 4	Medelpad	11th	Relegated
2009	Tier 7	Division 5	Medelpad	2nd	Promoted
2010	Tier 6	Division 4	Medelpad	7th	
2011	Tier 6	Division 4	Medelpad	9th	
2012	Tier 6	Division 4	Medelpad		

* League restructuring in 2006 resulted in a new division being created at Tier 3 and subsequent divisions dropping a level.
