= List of shipwrecks in November 1887 =

List of ships sunk, foundered, grounded, or otherwise lost during November 1887

The list of shipwrecks in November 1887 includes ships sunk, foundered, grounded, or otherwise lost during November 1887.

== 1 November ==
List of shipwrecks: 1 November 1887
Ship	State	Description
Alabama	United Kingdom	The barque was driven ashore and wrecked at Cape Henry, Virginia, United States. She was on a voyage from Saint John, New Brunswick, Canada to Washington, D.C.
Alert, and Egeria	United Kingdom; United States	The barque Egeria was driven into the paddle steamer Alert at Woodside, Cheshire. Both vessels were damaged.
Alice	United Kingdom	The ship was driven ashore and wrecked at Cardiff, Glamorgan.
Ann Knox	United Kingdom	The schooner was driven ashore and wrecked at Douglas, Isle of Man. Her three crew were rescued by rocket apparatus. She was on a voyage from Newry, County Antrim to Garston, Lancashire.
Ayrsome	United Kingdom	The steamship departed from Landskrona, Sweden for Antwerp, Belgium. No further trace, reported missing.
Bilow	United Kingdom	The steamship arrived at Dover, Kent on fire. She was on a voyage from Antwerp, Belgium to Genoa, Italy. The fire was extinguished.
Bloomer	United Kingdom	The schooner was scuttled at Whiting Bay, Isle of Arran.
Bolivar	Austria-Hungary	The ship was driven ashore and wrecked at Bilbao, Spain.
Bridget	United Kingdom	The schooner was driven against the breakwater at Holyhead, Anglesey. Her five crew were rescued. She was on a voyage from Dungarvan, County Antrim to Barrow-in-Furness, Lancashire. She subsequently floated off and capsized.
Christiania	Norway	The schooner was driven ashore at the mouth of the River Voryd. She was refloated and towed in to Caernarfon, United Kingdom.
Cloffock	United Kingdom	The schooner was wrecked at Ramsey, Isle of Man. Her four crew were rescued by rocket apparatus. She was on a voyage from Workington, Cumberland to the Strangford Lough.
Concordia	Flag unknown	The brig was driven ashore at Abersoch, Glamorgan. Her crew were rescued.
Crosbie	United Kingdom	The schooner foundered in the Irish Sea off Lytham St. Annes, Lancashire. Her eight crew were rescued.
Eastward	United Kingdom	The schooner collided with the training ship Indefatigable (United Kingdom). She was then collided with a shrimp boat and a schooner before she was driven into the landing stage, capsized and sank at Tranmere, Cheshire and sank with the loss of three of her five crew. She was on a voyage from the Weston Point Docks, Cheshire to Irvine, Ayrshire.
E. B. Everman	United States	The schooner was wrecked on the coast of Virginia with the loss of one of her five crew. Survivors were rescued by the steamship Wyanoke (United States). E. B. Everman was on a voyage from Philadelphia, Pennsylvania to Richmond, Virginia.
Faith	United Kingdom	The schooner was driven ashore at Lamlash, Isle of Arran.
Flower of May	United Kingdom	The ship ran aground and sank off the Conishead Priory, Lancashire. Her crew were rescued. She was on a voyage from Ulverston to Lytham St. Annes.
Gazelle	United Kingdom	The ship was driven ashore and wrecked at Cardiff.
Glad Tidings	United Kingdom	The ship was driven into other vessels at Portmadoc, Caernarfonshire and was damaged.
Happy Go Lucky	United Kingdom	The schooner was driven ashore on the Isle of Whithorn, Wigtownshire.
Harvester	United Kingdom	The barque was driven ashore at Cape Henry. She was on a voyage from Londonderry to Baltimore, Maryland, United States.
Helvetia	Norway	The barque was wrecked in Rhossili Bay. A crew member was rescued by breeches buoy, the rest reaching safety in the ship's boat. She was on a voyage from Campbellton, New Brunswick, Canada to Swansea, Glamorgan.
Humble	United Kingdom	The fishing trawler was driven ashore at Plymouth, Devon. She was refloated with assistance from the tug Vixen (United Kingdom).
Idea	United Kingdom	The ship was driven into other vessels at Porthmadog and was damaged.
Industry	United Kingdom	The ship was driven into other vessels at Porthmadog and was damaged.
Kittie Darling	United Kingdom	The schooner was abandoned off Ramsey. Her three crew were rescued by the Ramsey Lifeboat Two Sisters ( Royal National Lifeboat Institution).
Laurette	United Kingdom	The cutter yacht was driven ashore and wrecked at Fortuneswell, Dorset with the loss of all ten people on board.
Lerry	United Kingdom	The ship was driven ashore in Angle Bay. She was on a voyage from Gloucester to Fishguard, Pembrokeshire.
Lussignano	Austria-Hungary	The barque caught fire off Gibraltar and was abandoned. Her crew were rescued by the barque Gaspare (Italy). Lussignano subsequently sank.
Manantico	United States	The schooner was wrecked on the cost of Virginia with the loss of two of her crew.
Maren	Denmark	The brigantine was driven ashore at Greenhill, Dorset. Her crew were rescued by the Weymouth Lifeboat. She was on a voyage from "Laguna, Mexico" to Hamburg, Germany.
Margaret Johns	United Kingdom	The ship was driven ashore at "Caerury". Her crew survived.
Mary Ann	United Kingdom	The fishing vessel was driven ashore near the Mumbles, Glamorgan.
Mary Johns	United Kingdom	The ship was driven ashore at Fowey, Cornwall.
Mary Wilson	United Kingdom	The brig was driven ashore and wrecked on Oronsay, Inner Hebrides. Her crew were rescued. She was on a voyage from Ardrossan, Ayrshire to Limerick.
Maude	United Kingdom	The fishing trawler was driven ashore in Deadman's Bay, Devon. She was refloated with assistance from Bell (United Kingdom).
Mayo	United Kingdom	The steamship ran aground on the Kimmeridge Ledge, in the English Channel the coast of Dorset. Her crew were rescued by rocket apparatus. She was a total loss.
Memi	United Kingdom	The yacht sank in the Cattewater.
Natal	United Kingdom	The ship was driven ashore at Nixton Point, Cornwall.
Nautilus	Netherlands	The brig was driven ashore at Falmouth, Cornwall, United Kingdom with the loss of a crew member.
Ocean Bird	United States	The schooner sank in the Pasquatolik River with the loss of all nineteen people on board. She was on a voyage from Nag's Head to Elizabeth, North Carolina.
Phœnix	United Kingdom	The smack was driven ashore in Angle Bay.
Phosphorus	United Kingdom	The ketch sank at Plymouth, Devon.
Prothesa	United Kingdom	The brigantine was abandoned off Ramsey. Her seven crew were rescued by the Ramsey Lifeboat Two Sisters ( Royal National Lifeboat Institution).
Robert Preston	United Kingdom	The brigantine was driven ashore on the Isle of Whithorn.
Red Rover	United Kingdom	The schooner was driven ashore at Abersoch. Her crew were rescued.
Rudolph Ebel	Flag unknown	The ship departed from Falmouth for Cádiz, Spain. No further trace, reported overdue.
Samuel Dixon	United Kingdom	The schooner was abandoned in the Irish Sea off Wicklow. Her four crew were rescued by the Wicklow Lifeboat Robert T. Garden ( Royal National Lifeboat Institution).
Sendre	United Kingdom	The ship was driven ashore and wrecked at Cardiff.
Sparkling Wave	United Kingdom	The fishing trawler was driven ashore in Deadman's Bay. She was refloated with assistance from Bell (United Kingdom).
Susan Vittery	United Kingdom	The ship was driven ashore at Nixton Point.
Thursnella	Denmark	The brigantine was driven ashore and wrecked at Trefusis Point, Cornwall with the loss of her captain.
Token	United Kingdom	The ship was driven ashore and wrecked at Cardiff.
Tregonel	United Kingdom	The ship was driven ashore and wrecked at Penarth, Glamorgan. Her crew were rescued.
Trevaunce	United Kingdom	The schooner was driven ashore and severely damaged at Cardiff.
Water Lily	United Kingdom	The ship was driven ashore and wrecked at Cardiff.
Wild Hunter	United Kingdom	The schooner was driven into the landing stage and wrecked at Tranmere.
Unnamed	Flag unknown	The steamship was driven ashore on Heligoland.
Several unnamed vessels	United Kingdom	The Mersey Flats sank at Tranmere.
Unnamed	United Kingdom	The powder hulk broke from her moorings in the River Mersey. She was beached at Eastham, Cheshire with assistance from the ferry Firefly (United Kingdom).

== 2 November ==
List of shipwrecks: 2 November 1887
Ship	State	Description
Ann Francis	United Kingdom	The ship was run into by the steamship Countess of Dublin (United Kingdom) and sank at Millwall, Essex.
England's Rose	United Kingdom	The ship was driven onto the Saltcar Rocks, on the coast of Yorkshire. She was on a voyage from Great Yarmouth, Norfolk to Hartlepool, County Durham.

== 3 November ==
List of shipwrecks: 3 November 1887
Ship	State	Description
Canos	United Kingdom	The steamship ran ashore in the River Thames near Gravesend, Kent.
England''s Rose	United Kingdom	The collier, a brigantine, foundered off the coast of Kent.
Graphic	United Kingdom	The steam hoy was driven ashore in Pegwell Bay, Kent. She was on a voyage from Sandwich, Kent to the River Thames or vice versa.
John Hannah	United Kingdom	The brigantine ran aground on the Felixtowe Ledge, in the North Sea off the coast of Suffolk. Her crew survived. She was on a voyage from Seaham, County Durham to Ramsgate, Kent.
Saffron	United Kingdom	The collier, a brig, foundered off the Kent coast.
Wheatsheaf	United Kingdom	The Thames barge foundered off the Isle of Grain, Kent. Her crew were rescued by the tug London (United Kingdom).
Unnamed	Flag unknown	The brig was driven ashore at Deal, Kent.
Unnamed	Flag unknown	The brig was driven ashore in Pegwell Bat.

== 5 November ==
List of shipwrecks: 5 November 1887
Ship	State	Description
Livingstone	United Kingdom	The schooner was driven ashore at Dungeness, Kent with the loss of a crew member. She was on a voyage from Newcastle upon Tyne, Northumberland to Teignmouth, Devon. She was refloated on 12 November.

== 7 November ==
List of shipwrecks: 7 November 1887
Ship	State	Description
Earl of Beaconsfield	United Kingdom	The full-rigged ship was driven ashore 6 nautical miles (11 km) north of Withernsea, Yorkshire. She was on a voyage from Calcutta, India to Hull, Yorkshire. She subsequently broke up.
J. Benham	Norway	The ship departed from Pensacola, Florida, United States for Buenos Aires, Argentina. No further trace, reported missing.

== 8 November ==
List of shipwrecks: 8 November 1887
Ship	State	Description
Ariel	United Kingdom	The ship was abandoned in the North Sea off the Coquet Islands, Northumberland. Her crew were rescued by the steamship Otto McCombie (United Kingdom).
Gamecock	United Kingdom	The brig was run into by the steamship Mastiff (United Kingdom) and sank at Dalmuir, Renfrewshire. Her crew were rescued by Mastiff. Gamecock was on a voyage from Glasgow, Renfrewshire to Dundalk, County Louth.
Lene	United Kingdom	The schooner was abandoned in the North Sea 240 nautical miles (440 km) north east of Spurn Point, Yorkshire. Her crew were rescued by the smack Integrity (United Kingdom). Lene was on a voyage from Fowey, Cornwall to Stettin, Germany.

== 9 November ==
List of shipwrecks: 9 November 1887
Ship	State	Description
Drysdale	United Kingdom	The steamship sank at the stern at Greenock, Renfrewshire. She was refloated on 12 November and placed under repair.
Olga	Austria-Hungary	The full-rigged ship was wrecked between "Island Corrente" and Portopalo di Capo Passero, Sicily, Italy. Her crew were rescued. She was on a voyage from Philadelphia, Pennsylvania, United States to Fiume.
Sovereign	United Kingdom	The barquentine was abandoned by all but two of her crew. She was on a voyage from Miramichi, New Brunswick, Canada to a British port. She was subsequently taken in to Crookhaven, County Cork in a waterlogged condition.

== 11 November ==
List of shipwrecks: 11 November 1887
Ship	State	Description
Java	United Kingdom	The ship departed from Pensacola, Florida, United States for Hull, Yorkshire. No further trace, reported missing.
Marie Constance	United Kingdom	The ship departed from Ballyshannon, County Donegal for Cardiff, Glamorgan. No further trace, reported overdue.

== 12 November ==
List of shipwrecks: 12 November 1887
Ship	State	Description
Hoy Head	United Kingdom	The steamship foundered off the Godrevy Lighthouse, Cornwall. Her crew were rescued. She was on a voyage from Swansea, Glamorgan to Rouen, Seine-Inférieure, France.
Syren	United Kingdom	The barque foundered at sea. Her crew were rescued by the barque Indien (France). Syren was on a voyage from "Tuyu" to Falmouth, Cornwall.

== 13 November ==
List of shipwrecks: 13 November 1887
Ship	State	Description
Bakuin	United Kingdom	The steamship collided with the steamship Derwentwater (United Kingdom) and was severely damaged. She was taken in to Penarth, Glamorgan in a waterlogged condition.
Betsey	United Kingdom	The schooner sprang a leak and foundered 8 nautical miles (15 km) south south west of the Cardigan Bay Lightship ( Trinity House). Her crew were rescued. She was on a voyage from Caernarfon to Hull, Yorkshire.
Glenholme	United Kingdom	The steamship ran aground off Whitefarland Point, Renfrewshire.
Recepta	United Kingdom	The steamship was severely damaged by fire at South Shields, County Durham.
San Marco	Italy	The steamship departed from Penarth, Glamorgan for Genoa. No further trace, reported overdue.

== 14 November ==
List of shipwrecks: 14 November 1887
Ship	State	Description
Adrastea	Austria-Hungary	The barque ran aground at "Galippa", Tunisia. She was on a voyage from Jaffa, Ottoman Syria to London, United Kingdom. She was refloated and taken in to Tunis, Tunisia in a waterlogged condition.

== 15 November ==
List of shipwrecks: 15 November 1887
Ship	State	Description
Wah Young	United Kingdom	The steamship was destroyed by fire at sea with the loss of 400 lives She was on a voyage from Hong Kong to Canton, China.

== 16 November ==
List of shipwrecks: 16 November 1887
Ship	State	Description
Fatfield	United Kingdom	The steamship ran aground in the Humber at Whitton, Lincolnshire. She was on a voyage from Bilbao, Spain to Goole, Yorkshire.
Idomene	United Kingdom	The ship was wrecked in Qora Bay, 2 1/2 nautical miles (4.6 km) from Mazeppa Bay, with the loss of thirteen of her 24 crew. She was on a voyage from Rangoon, Burma to the English Channel.
Tom Roberts	United Kingdom	The schooner foundered off Ballaugh, Isle of Man. All four crew were rescued.
Vespasian	United Kingdom	The ship departed from Saigon, French Indo-China for Manila, Spanish East Indies. No further trace, reported overdue.
Wah Yeung	United Kingdom	The steamship was destroyed by fire in the Canton River with the loss of about 400 lives.

== 17 November ==
List of shipwrecks: 17 November 1887
Ship	State	Description
City of Newcastle	United Kingdom	The steamship carrying a cargo of cotton from Charlestown for Havre caught fire off the Old Head of Kinsale, County Cork on 11 November. She put into Falmouth, Cornwall with her fore hold on fire and was immediately towed to St Just Pool where she was scuttled.
Consul	United Kingdom	The steamship struck a rock off Small Island, in the Sea of Marmara and sank. All eighteen people on board were rescued by Marquis Sciciuana (Flag unknown).
Faithful	United Kingdom	The steamship collided with the steamship Capella (Germany) in the River Thames at Gravesend, Kent and was beached. Her passengers were taken off by the tug Cambria (United Kingdom). Faithful was refloated in early December and towed to Northfleet, Kent, where she was beached.
Princess Louise	United Kingdom	The steam yacht ran aground at Dundee, Forfarshire.
Revivalist	United Kingdom	The fishing trawler was run into by the steamship Connaught (United Kingdom) and sank at Kingstown, County Dublin. Her crew survived.

== 18 November ==
List of shipwrecks: 18 November 1887
Ship	State	Description
Alice Craig	United States	The schooner foundered in Lake Superior off the coast of Bayfield County, Wisconsin. Her crew were rescued by a fishing yawl the next day. Alice Craig remained afloat and later came ashore nearby on the coast of Wisconsin in the vicinity of 46°52.645′N 091°10.990′W, where she was stripped and abandoned. Her rudder washed ashore in Eagle Bay on the coast of Wisconsin in 1907.
City of Newcastle	United Kingdom	The steamship put in to Falmouth, Cornwall on fire and was scuttled. She was on a voyage from Charlestown, South Carolina, United States to Queenstown, County Cork and Havre de Grâce, Seine-Inférieure, France.
Dauntless	United Kingdom	The yawl yacht ran aground and was damaged at Dover, Kent.
Neto	(flag) Portugal	The brigantine foundered off Madeira. Her crew survived. She was on a voyage from the Azores to Lisbon.
Peter D. Smith	United Kingdom	The fishing schooner departed from Gloucester, Massachusetts, United States. No further trace, presumed foundered with the loss of all twelve crew. She was probably lost on 4 December on the Georges Bank.
Vortigern	United Kingdom	The steamship foundered at seawith the loss of nineteen lives. She was on a voyage from Surabaya, Netherlands East Indies to Hong Kong.
Unnamed	Italy	The smack was run into by the royal yacht SMS Greif (Austro-Hungarian Navy) and sank off Rovigno with the loss of a crew member. Survivors were rescued by SMS Greif.

== 19 November ==
List of shipwrecks: 19 November 1887
Ship	State	Description
Alfred Watts	United States	The full-rigged ship capsized 600 to 700 nautical miles (1,100 to 1,300 km) off the Bahamas with the loss of 26 of the 28 people on board. Survivors were rescued on 20 December by the barque Lizzie Perry ( Canada). Alfred Watts was on a voyage from Philadelphia, Pennsylvania to Japan.
Douro	United Kingdom	The steamship foundered off the Berlengas, Portugal with the loss of eight of her sixteen crew. Survivors were rescued by Brackley (United Kingdom). Douro was on a voyage from Glasgow, Renfrewshire to Barcelona, Spain.
Hellenese	Germany	The 1200 ton steamer went ashore at Dungeness, Kent in the fog. She was carrying frozen meat and wool from Montevideo for London. There were no injuries among the passengers and crew.
W. A. Scholten	Netherlands	The steamship was run into by the steamship Rosa Mary (United Kingdom) and sank in the English Channel 12 nautical miles (22 km) off the South Sands Head Lightship ( Trinity House) and 3 nautical miles (5.6 km) off Dover, Kent, United Kingdom with the loss of 132 of the 210 people on board. Some of the survivors were rescued by the steamship Ebro (United Kingdom), others by a Coastguard boat, a shore boat or landed in two of the ship's lifeboats. W. A. Scholten was on a voyage from Rotterdam, South Holland to New York, United States.
Sorrento		The steamer, carrying 61 passengers and a general cargo from New York to Hamburg went ashore at Dungeness, Kent.

== 20 November ==
List of shipwrecks: 20 November 1887
Ship	State	Description
Anna	Norway	The brig foundered off the Cabo da Roca, Portugal. Her crew were rescued by the barque Amalia (Sweden). Anna was on a voyage from Cádiz, Spain to Kristiansund.
Baroda	United Kingdom	The full-rigged ship collided with Buccleuch and sank in the River Mersey. Baroda was on a voyage from Calcutta, India to Liverpool, Lancashire.
Telephone	United States	The steamship caught fire near Astoria, Oregon, and was beached. One person died. She later was refloated and rebuilt.

== 21 November ==
List of shipwrecks: 21 November 1887
Ship	State	Description
Polynoris	United Kingdom	The steamship struck the wreck of W. A. Scholten (Netherlands) and sank in the English Channel 4 nautical miles (7.4 km) off Folkestone, Kent. Her crew were rescued.
Triton	Sweden	The schooner was driven ashore and wrecked at "Makkehead", Denmark.

== 22 November ==
List of shipwrecks: 22 November 1887
Ship	State	Description
Charles P. Chouteau	United States	The steamship was destroyed by fire in the Mississippi River at Sunflower Landing 135 miles (217 km) downstream of Memphis, Tennessee. One of her firemen died.
Palais Gallien	Flag unknown	The ship was driven ashore at Ronehamn, Gotland, Sweden.
Palmyra	United Kingdom	The steamship was run into by the steamship Odessa (United Kingdom) at Gravesend, Kent and was beached. Palmyra was on a voyage from London to Genoa, Italy.
Sir Robert Peel	United Kingdom	The ship capsized. She was righted the next day.
William Parsons II	United Kingdom	The fishing schooner departed from Gloucester, Massachusetts, United States. No further trace, lost with all twelve crew. She may have foundered on 4 December on the Georges Bank.
E. F. Sawyer	United States	The full-rigged ship was run into by a steamship and sank in the English Channel off Sandgate, Kent, United Kingdom with the loss of fourteen of her 22 crew. Survivors were rescued by the steamship.

== 23 November ==
List of shipwrecks: 23 November 1887
Ship	State	Description
Leander	Germany	The steamship collided with the wreck of E. F. Sawyer (United States) off Sandgate, Kent, United Kingdom. She was towed in to Dover, Kent in a sinking condition. She was on a voyage from Cádiz, Spain to Bremen.
Margaret and Ann	United Kingdom	The schooner ran aground on the Maplin Sand, in the North Sea off the coast of Essex.

== 24 November ==
List of shipwrecks: 24 November 1887
Ship	State	Description
Jane Roberts	United Kingdom	The ship was driven ashore at Cullercoats, Northumberland.
Serpho	United Kingdom	The steamship foundered off the coast of Portugal. Her crew were rescued by the steamship Gwalior (United Kingdom).

== 27 November ==
List of shipwrecks: 27 November 1887
Ship	State	Description
Michael and Christopher	United Kingdom	The schooner sprang a leak and was abandoned off the Turnberry Lighthouse, Ayrshire. She was on a voyage from Arklow, County Wicklow to Ayr. She subsequently foundered off the Isle of Arran.
Unnamed	Austria-Hungary	The fishing boat was run into by the steamship Vera (United Kingdom) and sank off Fiume. Her crew were rescued by Vera.

== 28 November ==
List of shipwrecks: 28 November 1887
Ship	State	Description
Lady Mostyn	United Kingdom	The steamship ran aground at Llanelly, Glamorgan and was run into by the steamship Creaden (United Kingdom). Lady Mostyn was refloated and put back to Llanelly.
Thetford	United Kingdom	The steamship was run into by the steamship Hawarden Castle (United Kingdom) and sank in the River Thames at Blackwall, Middlesex. Her crew were rescued by the tug Renown (United Kingdom). Thetford was refloated on 14 December.

== 29 November ==
List of shipwrecks: 29 November 1887
Ship	State	Description
Catherine	United Kingdom	The ship ran aground on the Swadman Rocks. She was on a voyage from London to Kirkcaldy, Fife. She was refloated and completed her voyage in a leaky condition.
Monday	United Kingdom	The Thames barge was run into by the steamship Arno (United Kingdom) in the Thames Estuary. Monday was beached at Hope Point.

== 30 November ==
List of shipwrecks: 30 November 1887
Ship	State	Description
Laleham	United Kingdom	The steamship was damaged by fire at Cardiff, Glamorgan.
Tafna	United Kingdom	The steamship was run into by the steamship Express at South Shields, County Durham and was severely damaged.

== Unknown date ==
List of shipwrecks: Unknown date in November 1887
Ship	State	Description
Activ	Germany	The brig ran aground on the Lillegrund, in the Baltic Sea, and sank. Her crew were rescued.
Adela	United Kingdom	The steamship was driven ashore near Saint-Brieuc, Côtes-du-Nord, France. She was on a voyage from Burntisland, Fife to Saint-Brieuc.
Agnes Louise	United Kingdom	The steamship ran aground in the River Tees. She was on a voyage from Dordrecht, South Holland, Netherlands to Middlesbrough, Yorkshire.
Albany	United States	The ship was driven ashore. She was later refloated and taken in to Cheboygan, Michigan.
Albatross	Netherlands	The barque collided with the steamship Allerwash (United Kingdom) and was severely damaged.
Alberta	United Kingdom	The schooner collided with the dynamite magazine Alpha (United Kingdom) in the River Thames and was beached.
Alerte	Germany	The schooner was wrecked on the Dungeness Spit, in the Strait of Magellan on or before 9 November.
Andrea	Austria-Hungary	The barque foundered at sea. Her crew were rescued by the barque Lennatin (Russia). Andrea was on a voyage from Genoa, Italy to New York, United States.
Angeline	Norway	The brig was abandoned in the North Sea. Her crew were rescued by the barque Mathilde (Sweden). Angeline was on a voyage from Grimsby, Lincolnshire, United Kingdom to Christiania.
Arizona	United States	The steamship was destroyed by fire at Marquette, Michigan.
Baring Brothers	United States	The ship ran aground at San Francisco, California. She was refloated and found to be severely leaky.
Bassano	United Kingdom	The steamship caught fire at Gothenburg, Sweden. She was on a voyage from New York to Gothenburg.
Belle of Devon	United Kingdom	The schooner was lost whilst on a voyage from Sydney, Nova Scotia, Canada to Saint John's, Newfoundland Colony.
Bellerophen	United Kingdom	The fishing smack was run into by a steamship and sank off Flamborough Head, Yorkshire. Her crew were rescued.
Bellona	United Kingdom	The steamship was wrecked off Imbros, Ottoman Empire. Her crew were rescued.
Ben Nevis	United Kingdom	The steamship was driven ashore at Sfântu-Gheorge, Romania.
Betty Sauber, and Cumberland	Germany; United Kingdom	The steamship Cumberland was run into by the steamship Betty Sauber at Hamburg. Both vessels were severely damaged. Betty Sauber was on a voyage from Hamburg to Sunderland, County Durham. Cumberland was on a voyage from Grangemouth, Stirlingshire to Hamburg. She ran aground.
Boreas	United Kingdom	The smack was driven ashore 2 nautical miles (3.7 km) north of Easington, Yorkshire. Her five crew were rescued by rocket apparatus.
Brabo	Belgium	The steamship ran aground off Cape Corrientes, Cuba. She was refloated two days later and taken in to Mobile, Alabama, United States.
Britannia	United Kingdom	The schooner was driven ashore at Fraserburgh, Aberdeenshire. She was refloated and taken in to Sandhaven, Aberdeenshire in a leaky condition.
Bucephalus	United Kingdom	The steamship was driven ashore in the Torres Strait. She was refloated.
Capri	United Kingdom	The steamship was wrecked on the Kentish Knock. Her crew were rescued by the Walton Lifeboat.
Choteau	United States	The steamship was destroyed by fire near Greenville, Mississippi. She was on a voyage from Memphis, Tennessee to New Orleans.
Christina	Norway	The barque ran aground on a sunken wreck at Pensacola, Florida, United States. She was on a voyage from Pensacola to Buenos Aires, Argentina.
Coban	United Kingdom	The ship was driven ashore at "Traverse", Canada. She was on a voyage from Montreal. Quebec to Sydney, Nova Scotia, Canada.
Cobden	United Kingdom	The steamship ran ashore at Thameshaven, Essex.
Condoren	Denmark	The schooner was driven ashore at Snekkersten. She was on a voyage from Ystad, Sweden to Bordeaux, Gironde, France.
County of Pembroke	United Kingdom	The barque ran aground on the Juister Riff, off Juist, Germany and was wrecked. Her crew were rescued by the Juist Lifeboat. She was on a voyage from Hamburg to London. She was later refloated with the assistance of a steamship and was taken in to the Ems.
Dahlia	United Kingdom	The ship was abandoned at sea. Her crew were rescued. She was on a voyage from Brazil to Saint John's, Newfoundland Colony.
Diomeda, and William Symington	United Kingdom	The steamships collided at Constantinople, Ottoman Empire and were both severely damaged.
Director	United Kingdom	The ship struck rocks off Balabac Island, Spanish East Indies and was abandoned. Her crew were rescued. She was on a voyage from Singapore, Straits Settlements to Shanghai, China.
Dragoman	United Kingdom	The steamship ran aground in the Suez Canal. She was refloated on 28 November.
Duchess of Argyle	United Kingdom	The ship was driven ashore and wrecked at Victoria, British Columbia, Canada.
Eliza Ecles	United Kingdom	The smack foundered in the North Sea with the loss of all hands.
Eros	Norway	The barque ran aground at Falsterbo, Sweden.
Garibaldi	Norway	The brig was run into by another vessel. She was on a voyage from Pori, Grand Duchy of Finland to Grimsby. She put in to Helsingør, Denmark in a waterlogged condition.
General Havelock	United Kingdom	The steamship ran aground in the River Thames at Ratcliff, Middlesex. She was the run into by the tug Midge (United Kingdom). General Havelock was refloated and resumed her voyage.
Genesta	United Kingdom	The sailing barge collided with the brig Ebenezer (United Kingdom) 7 nautical miles (13 km) south of Flamborough Head and was severely damaged. Genesta was on a voyage from Sunderland to Faversham, Kent. She was towed in to Scarborough, Yorkshire.
Guyandotte	United States	The ship collided with a schooner and was severely damaged. She was on a voyage from Norfolk, Virginia to New York.
Harbinger	United Kingdom	The steamship collided with the steamship Rowan (United Kingdom) in the River Thames and was beached.
Harrowgate	United Kingdom	The steamship caught fire at New Orleans, Louisiana, United States.
Hawarden	United Kingdom	The steamship arrived at Queenstown, County Cork on fire. She was on a voyage from Savannah, Georgia, United States to Reval, Russia.
Hbar	Sweden	The ship was lost at Sanlúcar de Barrameda, Spain.
Hutton Hall	United Kingdom	The ship caught fire at Calcutta, India. The fire was extinguished.
Ianthe	United Kingdom	The steamship was driven ashore at Smyrna, Ottoman Empire. She was refloated with assistance and taken in to Mersina, Ottoman Empire.
Impi	Russia	The brig was driven ashore at Hittarp, Sweden.
Italia	Flag unknown	The ship struck rocks at Porto, Portugal. She was refloated, towed in to Porto in a waterlogged condition and was beached.
Killarney	United Kingdom	The ship collided with Cruisader and sank off Yloilo, Spanish East Indies. Her crew survived.
Kimberley	United Kingdom	The steamship caught fire at New Orleans. The fire was extinguished.
Lavinia	Germany	The steamship struck a sunken rock at Corral, Chile and became leaky.
Llavarello Siroceri	Italy	The ship was abandoned in the Mediterranean Sea. Her crew survived.
Lombard	United Kingdom	The steamship collided with the quayside at Hull, Yorkshire and sank at the bow. She was on a voyage from Odesa, Russia to Hull.
Lorely	Germany	The barque was driven ashore at "Loosen". She was on a voyage from Hull to Danzig.
Maria	Sweden	The brig was driven ashore at Gothenburg. She was on a voyage from Uddevalla to Hartlepool, County Durham.
Mary Lohden	Flag unknown	The ship ran aground at Juniskär, Sweden.
Monmouthshire	United Kingdom	The ship ran aground at Montrose, Forfarshire. She was on a voyage from Montrose to Sydney, New South Wales. She was refloated and put back to Montrose.
Muxal	United Kingdom	The brig ran aground on the Cheney Rock Spit, in the Thames Estuary.
Nedsjed	United Kingdom	The steamship ran aground in the River Tees and was severely damaged. She was on a voyage from Middlesbrough to Bombay, India. She was refloated on 18 November and put back to Middlesbrough.
Newnham	United Kingdom	The steamship ran aground at Atherfield, Isle of Wight. She was refloated on 21 November.
Onkshaia	Denmark	The brig ran aground on Kalbaden, in the Baltic Sea. She was on a voyage from Kotka, Grand Duchy of Finland to Leith, Lothian, United Kingdom.
Osseo	United States	The ship was abandoned at sea. She was on a voyage from New York to Trinidad.
Pansewitz	Germany	The barque was driven ashore on "Amack", Denmark. She was on a voyage from Danzig to Gloucester, United Kingdom. She was refloated with assistance and taken in to Copenhagen, Denmark.
Paolina B	Italy	The barque was driven ashore at "Cedevia", Spain. Her crew were rescued. She was on a voyage from Plymouth, Devon, United Kingdom to an American port.
Pembury	United Kingdom	The steamship was driven ashore. She was on a voyage from Ängelholm, Sweden to Cork. She was refloated with assistance and taken in to Cuxhaven, Germany.
Plover	United Kingdom	The steamship struck a rock at "Trillingate" and sank. She was a total loss.
Polynia	United Kingdom	The steam whaler was driven ashore in Prince Regent's Inlet. She was refloated three days later.
Prince Eugene	(United Kingdom of Great Britain and Ireland) Guernsey	The ship foundered off Alderney, Channel Islands. She was on a voyage from Guernsey to London.
Queen of the Isles	United Kingdom	The schooner ran aground in the River Liffey. She was on a voyage from Dublin to Irvine, Ayrshire.
Rebecca	Germany	The brig was wrecked at Savanilla, Colombia. Her crew were rescued.
Rebecca Mary	United Kingdom	The schooner ran aground in the River Mersey. She was refloated.
Rivas	Flag unknown	The ship was driven ashore at Maassluis, South Holland. She was refloated.
Southella	Flag unknown	The steamship was driven ashore at "Storjungfron", Sweden.
Stockholm	Germany	The steamship ran aground at Stockholm, Sweden. She was on a voyage from Hamburg to Stockholm.
Stork	United Kingdom	The steamship was driven ashore near Cuxhaven. She was on a voyage from Hamburg to London.
Sunshine	United Kingdom	The ship ran aground on the Montejo Reef, off Sanlúcar de Barrameda. She was later refloated and towed in to Bonanza, Spain.
Svalen	Flag unknown	The brig was driven ashore and wrecked at Mogador, Morocco. Her crew were rescued. She was on a voyage from Sunderland to Mogador.
Sylphiden	Denmark	The schooner collided with the steamship Eastwood (United Kingdom) and sank off Sandhammaren, Sweden. Her crew were rescued. Sylphiden was on a voyage from Fraserburgh to Liepāva, Russia.
To Brodre	Flag unknown	The ship ran aground. She was later refloated and taken in to Garston, Lancashire, United Kingdom.
Tønsberg	Norway	The barque was abandoned in the Atlantic Ocean. Her crew were rescued by Clara B. Parodi (Flag unknown).
Trio	United Kingdom	The steamship ran aground and was holed by her anchor at Beuville, Calvados, France. She was on a voyage from Newcastle upon Tyne, Northumberland to Beuville.
Universe	United Kingdom	The paddle steamer ran aground at Barrow-in-Furness, Lancashire. She was refloated and taken in to Barrow-in-Furnesss in a leaky condition.
Victoria	United Kingdom	The ketch caught fire and was abandoned in the Thames Estuary. She was on a voyage from Ipswich, Suffolk to London.
Vionis	United Kingdom	The steamship was lost with all seven crew. She was on a voyage from Lunenburg, Nova Scotia to Puerto Rico.
Vlaanderen	Belgium	The steamship was wrecked on the French coast. She was on a voyage from Banana, Congo Free State to Antwerp.
Wilhelmine Agatha	United Kingdom	The barquentine was driven ashore north of "Drumore". She was on a voyage from Liverpool, Lancashire to Belfast, County Antrim.
Winchester	United States	The ship arrived at Bermuda on fire. She was on a voyage from New Orleans to Sevastopol, Russia. The fire was extinguished.
