= Sund IF =

Swedish football club

- Full name: Sund Idrottsförening
- Founded: 1921
- Ground: Malands IP; Sundsbruk; Sweden
- Chairman: Bert Hägg
- Head coach: Conny Sjödin
- Coach: Dan Jonsson
- League: Division 4 Medelpad
- 2012: Division 4 Medelpad, 3rd
Home colours	Away colours

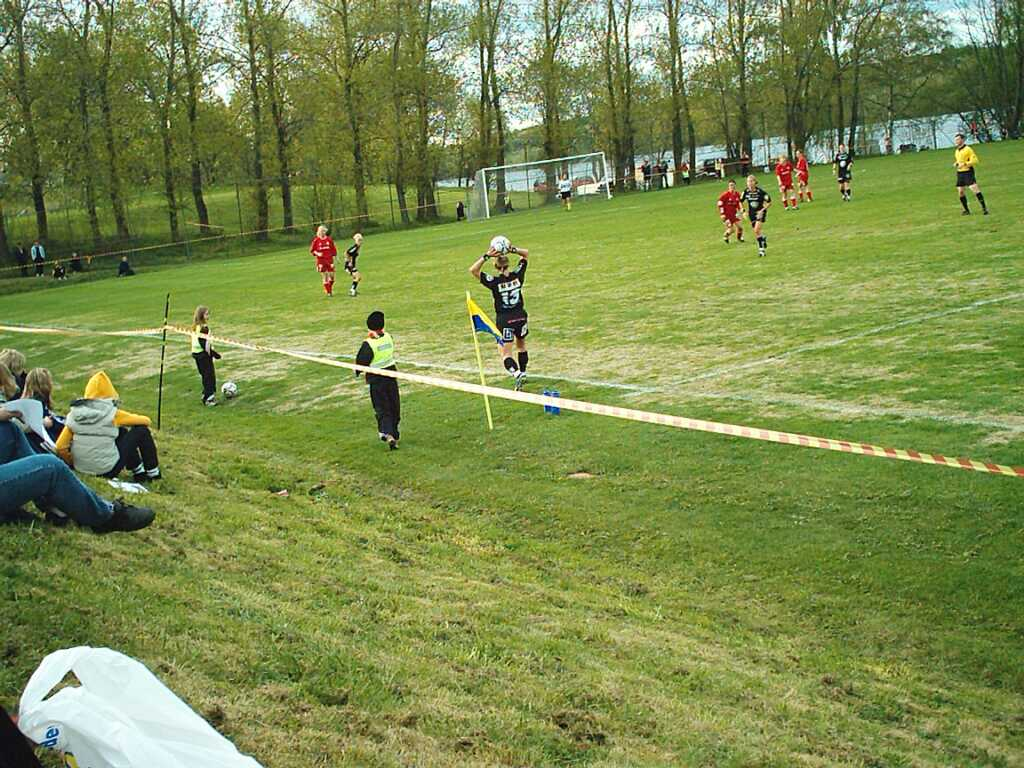
Svenska Cupen ladies match between Sund IF and Umeå IK on 27 May 2004 at Malands IP

Sund IF is a Swedish football club located in Sundsbruk in Sundsvall Municipality, Västernorrland County.

== Background ==
Sund Idrottsförening were formed on 9 September 1921. Eight years later Sund IF and Skönviks IF merged and took the "neutral" name Sköns IF. For many years the club was called anything but Sund IF, but on 23 January 1965, it became Sund IF again and that's the name that still applies today. The club has over the years not only been involved with football and has had sections covering skiing and orienteering.

Since their foundation Sund IF has participated mainly in the middle and lower divisions of the Swedish football league system. The club currently plays in Division 4 Medelpad which is the sixth tier of Swedish football. They play their home matches at the Malands IP in Sundsbruk.

Sund IF are affiliated to Medelpads Fotbollförbund.

== Recent history ==
In recent seasons Sund IF have competed in the following divisions:

2013 – Division IV, Medelpad
2012 – Division IV, Medelpad
2011 – Division III, Södra Norrland
2003–2010 – Division IV, Medelpad
2002 – Division III, Mellersta Norrland
2001 – Division IV, Medelpad
2000 – Division III, Mellersta Norrland
1995–1999 – Division IV, Medelpad
1994 – Division III, Mellersta Norrland
1993 – Division III, Mellersta Norrland

== Attendances ==
In recent seasons Sund IF have had the following average attendances:

Season	Average attendance	Division / Section	Level
2008	Not available	Div 4 Medelpad	Tier 6
2009	62	Div 4 Medelpad	Tier 6
2010	66	Div 4 Medelpad	Tier 6
2011	98	Div 3 Södra Norrland	Tier 5

* Attendances are provided in the Publikliga sections of the Svenska Fotbollförbundet website.

The attendance record was established on 27 May 2004 when 1,903 people watched the Svenska Cupen ladies match at Maland IP between Sund IF and Umeå IK.
