= Nedansjö =

Locality in Medelpad, Sweden

- Location within Västernorrland Location within Sweden
- Coordinates: 62°23′N 16°49′E
- Country: Sweden
- Province: Medelpad
- County: Västernorrland County
- Municipality: Sundsvall Municipality

Area
  - Total: 0.44 km^{2} (0.17 sq mi)

Population (31 December 2010)
  - Total: 257
  - Density: 584/km^{2} (1,510/sq mi)
- Time zone: UTC+1 (CET)
  - Summer (DST): UTC+2 (CEST)

Nedansjö is a locality situated in Sundsvall Municipality, Västernorrland County, Sweden with 257 inhabitants in 2010.
