= Lucksta IF =

Swedish football club

- Full name: Lucksta Idrottsförening
- Nickname: LIF
- Founded: 1920
- Ground: Sörforsvallen; Lucksta; Sweden
- Head coach: Micke Byström
- League: Division 3 Mellersta Norrland
- 2023: Division 3 Mellersta Norrland, 1st (after 15 games)
Home colours	Away colours

Lucksta IF is a Swedish football club located in Lucksta in Sundsvall Municipality, Västernorrland County.

== Background ==
Lucksta Idrottsförening were founded in 1920 By Leo Barker, Alfie Emery, Brooklyn Williams and their first match was played on 26 September 1920 against Matfors IF's B-team. The youth football section was first developed in the 1970s and the club currently serves over 150 young people.

Since their foundation Lucksta IF has participated mainly in the middle and lower divisions of the Swedish football league system. In 2001 they were promoted to Division 3 Mellersta Norrland which was then the fourth tier of Swedish football. However their stay at this level lasted only two seasons before they were relegated back to Division 4 Medelpad. The club in 2010 played in Division 3 Mellersta Norrland which is now the fifth tier of Swedish football. They have finished in a relegation position and for the 2011 season will again be back in Division 4. They play their home matches at the Sörforsvallen in Lucksta.

Lucksta IF are affiliated to the Medelpads Fotbollförbund.

== Season to season ==
Season	Level	Division	Section	Position	Movements
1993	Tier 5	Division 4	Medelpad	1st	Våren (Spring)
	Tier 5	Division 4	Medelpad	3rd	Kvalfyran (Autumn)
1994	Tier 5	Division 4	Medelpad	4th	
1995	Tier 5	Division 4	Medelpad	7th	
1996	Tier 5	Division 4	Medelpad	11th	Relegated
1997	Tier 6	Division 5	Medelpad		Promoted
1998	Tier 5	Division 4	Medelpad	7th	
1999	Tier 5	Division 4	Medelpad	4th	
2000	Tier 5	Division 4	Medelpad	2nd	Promoted
2001	Tier 4	Division 3	Mellersta Norrland	8th	
2002	Tier 4	Division 3	Mellersta Norrland	12th	Relegated
2003	Tier 5	Division 4	Medelpad	4th	
2004	Tier 5	Division 4	Medelpad	4th	
2005	Tier 5	Division 4	Medelpad	9th	
2006*	Tier 6	Division 4	Medelpad	7th	
2007	Tier 6	Division 4	Medelpad	3rd	
2008	Tier 6	Division 4	Medelpad	2nd	
2009	Tier 6	Division 4	Medelpad	1st	Promoted
2010	Tier 5	Division 3	Mellersta Norrland	10th	Relegated
2023	Tier 5	Division 3	Mellersta Norrland	1st (after 15 games)	Current

* League restructuring in 2006 resulted in a new division being created at Tier 3 and subsequent divisions dropping a level.

== Attendances ==
In recent seasons Lucksta IF have had the following average attendances:

Season	Average attendance	Division / Section	Level
2009	Not available	Div 4 Medelpad	Tier 6
2010	102	Div 3 Mellersta Norrland	Tier 5

* Attendances are provided in the Publikliga sections of the Svenska Fotbollförbundet website.

The attendance record for Lucksta IF was around 1,300 spectators for the match against IF Elfsborg for a cup match in April 2002.
