= Fenby =

Fenby is a surname. Notable people with the surname include:

- Andy Fenby (born 1985), Welsh rugby union footballer
- Eric Fenby OBE (1906–1997), English composer and teacher, Frederick Delius's amanuensis from 1928 to 1934
- Jonathan Fenby (born 1942), founding partner and managing director of the China team at Trusted Sources, London
- Joseph B. Fenby (1841–1903), inventor of the Electro-Magnetic Phonograph in 1863
- Thomas Fenby (1875–1956), British Liberal politician and blacksmith

== See also ==
- Ashby cum Fenby, village and civil parish in North East Lincolnshire, England
- Fanbyn
