= Vi, Sweden =

Vi
- Location within Västernorrland Location within Sweden
- Coordinates: 62°26′N 17°25′E
- Country: Sweden
- Province: Medelpad
- County: Västernorrland County
- Municipality: Sundsvall Municipality

Area
  - Total: 3.44 km^{2} (1.33 sq mi)

Population (31 December 2010)
  - Total: 4,997
  - Density: 1,452/km^{2} (3,760/sq mi)
- Time zone: UTC+1 (CET)
  - Summer (DST): UTC+2 (CEST)

Vi is a locality situated on Alnön in Sundsvall Municipality, Västernorrland County, Sweden with 4,997 inhabitants in 2010.
