= Klingsta och Allsta =

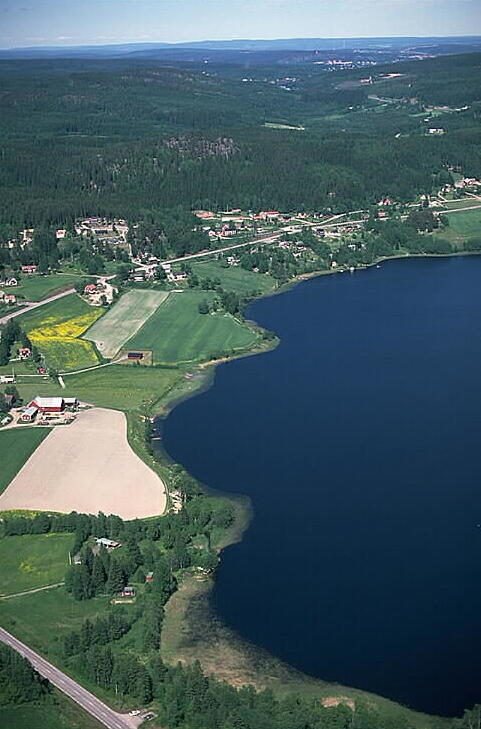
- Klingsta och Allsta from above

- Location within Västernorrland Location within Sweden
- Coordinates: 62°19′N 17°13′E
- Country: Sweden
- Province: Medelpad
- County: Västernorrland County
- Municipality: Sundsvall Municipality

Area
  - Total: 0.68 km^{2} (0.26 sq mi)

Population (31 December 2010)
  - Total: 342
  - Density: 502/km^{2} (1,300/sq mi)
- Time zone: UTC+1 (CET)
  - Summer (DST): UTC+2 (CEST)

Klingsta och Allsta is a locality situated in Sundsvall Municipality, Västernorrland County, Sweden with 342 inhabitants in 2010.
