= Svartvik =

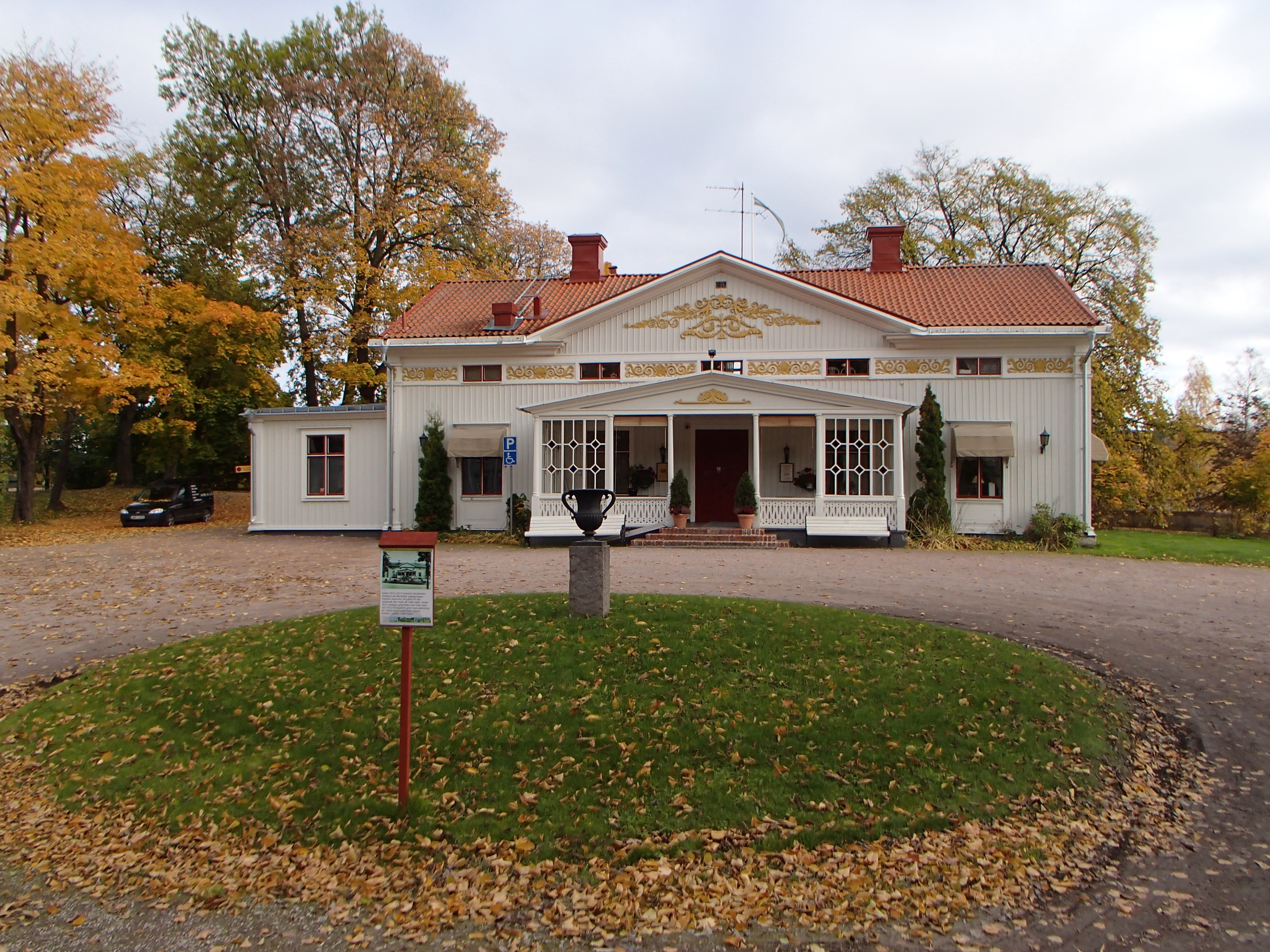

- Location within Västernorrland Location within Sweden
- Coordinates: 62°19′N 17°22′E
- Country: Sweden
- Province: Medelpad
- County: Västernorrland County
- Municipality: Sundsvall Municipality

Area
  - Total: 1.35 km^{2} (0.52 sq mi)

Population (31 December 2010)
  - Total: 949
  - Density: 703/km^{2} (1,820/sq mi)
- Time zone: UTC+1 (CET)
  - Summer (DST): UTC+2 (CEST)

Svartvik is a locality situated in Sundsvall Municipality, Västernorrland County, Sweden with 949 inhabitants in 2010.
