= Economic Transformation Programme =

The Economic Transformation Programme is an initiative by the Malaysian government to turn Malaysia into a high income economy by the year of 2020. It is managed by the Performance Management and Delivery Unit (PEMANDU), an agency under the Prime Minister Department of Malaysia.

== Overview ==
Launched on 21 September 2010, it is a comprehensive economic transformation plan to propel Malaysia's economy into high income economy. The program will lift Malaysia's gross national income (GNI) to US$523 billion by 2020, and raise per capita income from US$6,700 to at least US$15,000, meeting the World Bank's threshold for high income nation. It is projected that Malaysia will be able to achieve the targets set if GNI grows by 6% per annum.

Set to revitalise Malaysia's private sector, the 60% of the blueprint's investment would derived from private sector, 32% from government linked companies and the remaining 8% from the government. Various sectors for development have been identified and are called National Key Economic Areas (NKEA).

== Labs ==
The Performance Management and Delivery Unit (Pemandu) has conducted laboratories to study on how to implement Malaysia's goal of becoming a high-income country by 2020. As of 2010 131 entry point projects (EPPs) and 60 business opportunities have been identified by the laboratories. It is estimated that these initiatives will generate RM500 billion of national income annually and create up to 2.2 million jobs by 2020. 92 percent of the necessary funding is slated to come from the private sector.

The labs took place over a period of two months in the summer of 2010. 425 people from the government and private sector took part. 211 companies have taken part, including Shell, Exxon-Mobil, MYDIN, Sime Darby, Genting Plantations, Petronas, PricewaterhouseCoopers, Celcom, Ericsson, Maybank, Tesco, Sunway Medical Centre, Masterskill University College, The Body Shop, AirAsia, Malaysia Airlines, RapidKL and Digi Telecommunications.

== National Key Economic Areas ==
Since 92% of the total investments will originate from private sector, the sector is much involved in the planning of this transformation blueprint. A workshop had been organised by Performance and Delivery Unit (PEMANDU) to identify the 12 National Key Economic Areas (NKEA). The NKEA is the key driver to the success of this program as such activities have the potential to contribute significantly to the growth of the economy of Malaysia.

There are 131 entry point projects (EPP) identified under the NKEA, which includes a high speed railway connecting Penang to Singapore and MRT in Kuala Lumpur which YTL Corporation first proposed and are currently looking to undertake.

Economic activities that are categorised as NKEA will be prioritised in government planning and funds allocation. Policies will be amended to facilitate fast track implementation of such activities, including liberalising the market and removal of bottlenecks.

Under this policy, private companies are invited to get involved, with PEMANDU pushing for the implementation to speed up the implementation. Among the companies that are involved in the transformation programme are YTL Corporation, Shell Malaysia, AirAsia, Hovid Inc, Select-TV, Exxon-Mobil, Dialog Group, Tenaga Nasional, Cisco.

=== Oil, gas and energy ===
As of 2010, the energy sector has been an important part of Malaysia’s economic growth and constitutes about 20 percent of GDP. The Malaysian government plans to increase diversification of the energy industry, increase exploration for new oil and gas resources, enhance production from known reserves, and encourage the use of alternative energy source such as nuclear, solar, and hydro-electric. The government is working to meet these goals 12 of what it calls "entry point projects" or EPPs. The government wants the energy sectors contribution to gross national income to rise from RM110 billion in 2009 to RM241 billion in 2020. Achieving this goal will create more than 50,000 new jobs with large proportion of these being for skilled professionals such as engineers and geologists. Achieving these goals will require RM218 billion in funding. The government claims only 1 percent of this funding will come from the public sector. An extra RM64 billion will be needed to make up for the expected decline in oil production. Tax rebates for improved energy efficiency are expected to cost RM12 billion.

Another tool introduced was the Risk Service Contract. The employment of optimising techniques and technologies that are cost-efficient to safeguard profitability is crucial in the oil and gas sector, in particular with regard to the risk service contract (RSC) applied to enhance production of marginal fields. According to think tank Arc Media Global, "With some 106 marginal oil fields containing 580 million barrels of oil, Malaysia is Southeast Asia’s second largest oil and gas producing nation." On 26 July 2011, at the Production Optimisation Week Asia in Kuala Lumpur, it was discussed that the RSC is essentially a contract that significantly increases an operator’s risks of exposure. In this case, the awardees or the consortium bears almost all the operating risks and is not paid in the event that the project or system fails.

=== Palm oil ===
As of 2010, Malaysia’s palm oil industry is the fourth largest component of the national economy and accounts for RM53 billion of gross national income. The industry covers the value chain from plantations to processing. The development of this industry is mainly private and remains heavily oriented towards plantations. With limited land available to continue the expansion of plantations, the government desires to increase efficiency in production and focus on providing great value through downstream activities. The Palm Oil NKEA is designed to increase total contributions to national income from the palm oil industry by RM125 billion to reach RM178 billion by 2020. The government hopes that 41,000 new jobs will be created in this sector.

Palm oil related EPPs will focus on upstream productivity and downstream expansion. These EPPs will focus on replanting of ageing oil palms, mechanising plantations, stringently enforcing best practices to enhance yields, implementing strict quality control to enhance oil extraction, and developing biogas facilities at palm mills to capture the methane released during milling. Downstream expansion and sustainability will be achieved by capturing the lucrative market segments that focus more on refined products such as oleo-derivatives, food, health products, and bio-fuels.

The government says these projects will require funding of RM124 billion over the next 10 years with 98 percent of the funding coming from the private sector.

=== Financial services ===
From 2006 to 2009 financial services constituted 10.9 percent of Malaysia's gross domestic product. The government believes that lack of economies of scale, poor liquidity, lack of diversity, low levels of financial knowledge, and competition from other regional financial centres such as Hong Kong and Singapore are significant problems for this sector.

The government aims to increase the financial industry's contribution to gross national income from RM121 billion as of 2010 to RM180 billion in 2020. The Financial Services NKEA calls for creating 275,000 jobs in this sector with 56% of those jobs offering an average compensation of RM4,000 per month. These goals will be achieved by strengthening core financial services, creating new services and institutions oriented towards serving those with high incomes, developing avenues for growth such as expanding the asset management business, and pursuing business overseas, especially attracting foreign capital and becoming a centre for Islamic banking.

Pemandu predicts that RM211 billion will be required to reach these goals by 2020. The public sector is slated to provide 4 percent of this investment. The government is working to facilitate these goals by making Malaysia's business environment more attractive for international capital, attracting and retaining talented professionals, reducing regulation, and lowering taxes.

=== Private healthcare ===
On 11 January 2011, Pemandu announced in Pemandu Official Website that RM3 billion will be invested into Country Heights Holdings Berhad. The Country Heights Group of Companies is developing the Mines Wellness City as an integrated health and wellness resort, which will serve as a one-stop destination for both modern and complementary medicine, with a Private Health Screening Centre and a Traditional Chinese Medicine Centre.

- Wholesale & Retail
- Tourisms
- Information and Communication Technology
- Education
- Business Services
- Electrical & Electronics
- Agriculture
- Greater Kuala Lumpur
