= Johannedal =

- Location within Västernorrland Location within Sweden
- Coordinates: 62°26′N 17°22′E
- Country: Sweden
- Province: Medelpad
- County: Västernorrland County
- Municipality: Sundsvall Municipality

Area
  - Total: 2.01 km^{2} (0.78 sq mi)

Population (31 December 2010)
  - Total: 2,754
  - Density: 1,373/km^{2} (3,560/sq mi)
- Time zone: UTC+1 (CET)
  - Summer (DST): UTC+2 (CEST)
- Climate: Dfc

Johannedal is a locality situated in Sundsvall Municipality, Västernorrland County, Sweden with 2,754 inhabitants in 2010.
