= Tunadal =

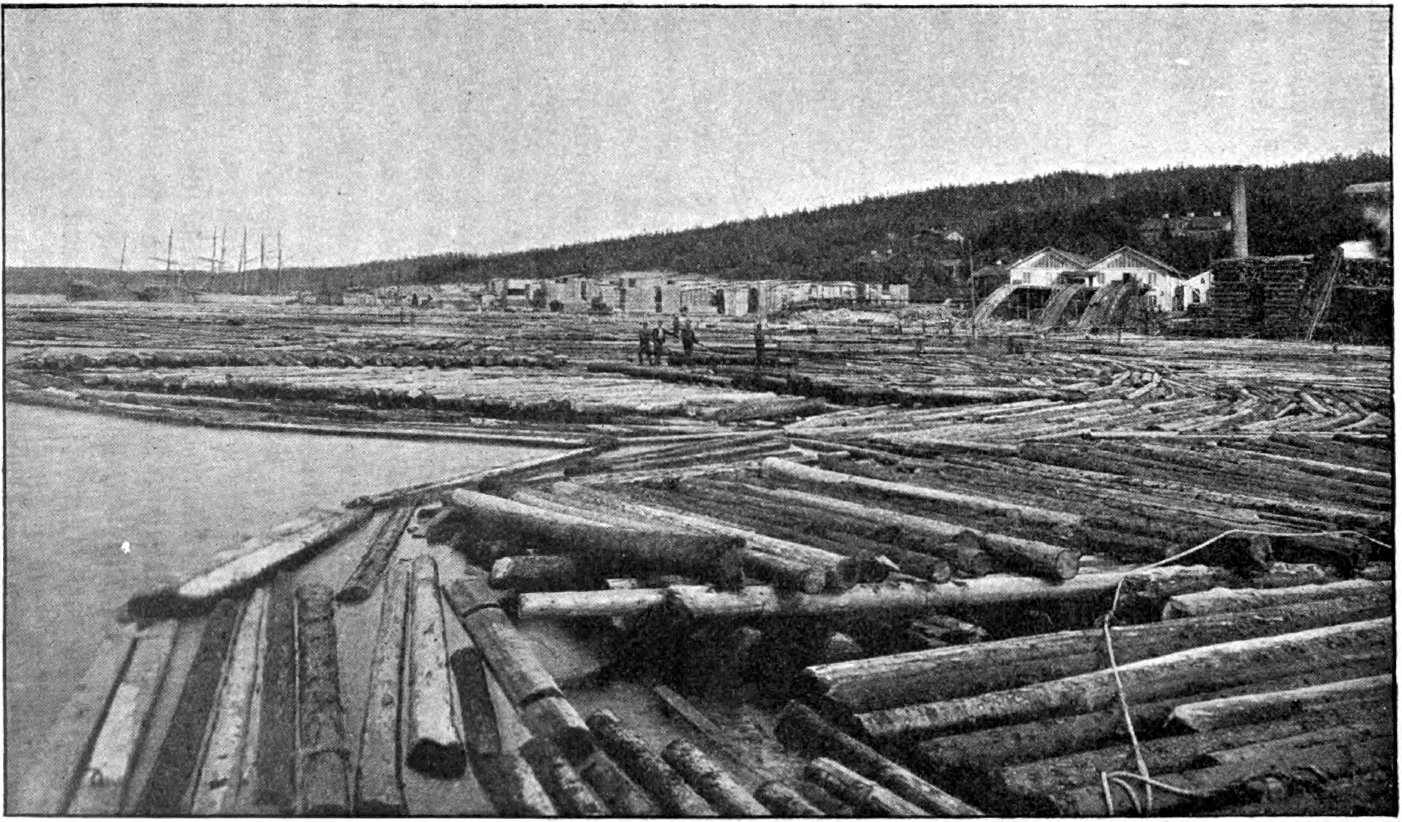
- timber works in 1908

- Location within Västernorrland Location within Sweden
- Coordinates: 62°25′N 17°23′E
- Country: Sweden
- Province: Medelpad
- County: Västernorrland County
- Municipality: Sundsvall Municipality

Area
  - Total: 1.77 km^{2} (0.68 sq mi)

Population (31 December 2010)
  - Total: 360
  - Density: 203/km^{2} (530/sq mi)
- Time zone: UTC+1 (CET)
  - Summer (DST): UTC+2 (CEST)
- Climate: Dfc

Tunadal (Swedish pronunciation: [tɵnaˈdɑːl]) is a locality situated in Sundsvall Municipality, Västernorrland County, Sweden with 360 inhabitants in 2010.

== History ==
Steam powered saw mills were introduced in Sweden in 1849 at Tunadal. Twenty more steam powered saw mills were started in the decade. These sawmills were usually placed near ports and the former water powered saw mills were closed.
