= Skottsund =

- Location within Västernorrland Location within Sweden
- Coordinates: 62°17′N 17°23′E
- Country: Sweden
- Province: Medelpad
- County: Västernorrland County
- Municipality: Sundsvall Municipality

Area
  - Total: 1.08 km^{2} (0.42 sq mi)

Population (31 December 2010)
  - Total: 1,069
  - Density: 987/km^{2} (2,560/sq mi)
- Time zone: UTC+1 (CET)
  - Summer (DST): UTC+2 (CEST)

Skottsund is a locality situated in Sundsvall Municipality, Västernorrland County, Sweden with 1,069 inhabitants in 2010.
