= Sundsbruk =

- Location within Västernorrland Location within Sweden
- Coordinates: 62°27′N 17°21′E
- Country: Sweden
- Province: Medelpad
- County: Västernorrland County
- Municipality: Sundsvall Municipality

Area
  - Total: 4.63 km^{2} (1.79 sq mi)

Population (31 December 2010)
  - Total: 2,137
  - Density: 461/km^{2} (1,190/sq mi)
- Time zone: UTC+1 (CET)
  - Summer (DST): UTC+2 (CEST)

Sundsbruk is a locality situated in Sundsvall Municipality, Västernorrland County, Sweden with 2,137 inhabitants in 2010.

== Sports ==
The following sports clubs are located in Sundsbruk:

- Sund IF
