= Matfors IF =

Swedish football club

- Full name: Matfors Idrottsförening
- Founded: 1901
- Ground: Thulevallen; Matfors; Sweden
- Chairman: Jan-Erik Engström
- Director of Sport: Lennart Törnkvist
- Coach: Lars Laban Andersson
- League: Division 4 Medelpad
- 2013: 7th
Home colours	Away colours

Matfors IF is a Swedish football club located in Matfors.

== Background ==
Matfors Idrottsförening is a Swedish sports club situated in Matfors in Sundsvall Municipality, Västernorrland County. It was founded in 1901 under the name of Thule skidklubb (Thule Skiing club). In 1916 the name was changed to Matfors IF. The club is currently active in football (men's and women's soccer), skiing and tennis.

Matfors IF currently plays in Division 4 Medelpad which is the sixth tier of Swedish football. They play their home matches at the Thulevallen in Matfors.

The club is affiliated to Medelpads Fotbollförbund. Matfors IF played in the 2010 Svenska Cupen but lost 0–2 at home to Friska Viljor FC in the preliminary round.

== Season to season ==
Season	Level	Division	Section	Position	Movements
1993	Tier 3	Division 2	Norrland	3rd	
1994	Tier 3	Division 2	Norrland	6th	
1995	Tier 3	Division 2	Norrland	12th	Relegated
1996	Tier 4	Division 3	Mellersta Norrland	3rd	
1997	Tier 4	Division 3	Mellersta Norrland	7th	
1998	Tier 4	Division 3	Mellersta Norrland	6th	
1999	Tier 4	Division 3	Mellersta Norrland	5th	
2000	Tier 4	Division 3	Mellersta Norrland	2nd	Promotion Playoffs
2001	Tier 4	Division 3	Mellersta Norrland	2nd	Promotion Playoffs
2002	Tier 4	Division 3	Mellersta Norrland	12th	Relegated
2003	Tier 5	Division 4	Medelpad	2nd	Promotion Playoffs
2004	Tier 5	Division 4	Medelpad	1st	Promoted
2005	Tier 4	Division 3	Mellersta Norrland	10th	Relegated
2006*	Tier 6	Division 4	Medelpad	10th	
2007	Tier 6	Division 4	Medelpad	8th	
2008	Tier 6	Division 4	Medelpad	9th	
2009	Tier 6	Division 4	Medelpad	10th	
2010	Tier 6	Division 4	Medelpad	8th	
2011	Tier 6	Division 4	Medelpad	3rd	
2012	Tier 6	Division 4	Medelpad	11th	
2013	Tier 7	Division 5	Medelpad	7th	

* League restructuring in 2006 resulted in a new division being created at Tier 3 and subsequent divisions dropping a level.
