= MYADM =

Protein-coding gene in the species Homo sapiens

Identifiers
- Aliases: MYADM, SB135, myeloid-associated differentiation marker, myeloid associated differentiation marker
- External IDs: OMIM: 609959; MGI: 1355332; GeneCards: MYADM

Gene location (Human)
Chr.	Chromosome 19 (human)
Band	19q13.42	Start	53,864,763 bp
Band	19q13.42	End	53,876,435 bp

Gene location (Mouse)
Chr.	Chromosome 7 (mouse)
Band	7 A1|7 1.92 cM	Start	3,337,605 bp
Band	7 A1|7 1.92 cM	End	3,348,958 bp
RNA expression pattern
Bgee	Human / Mouse (ortholog); Top expressed in: saphenous vein; vena cava; tail of epididymis; synovial joint; synovial membrane; left uterine tube; skin of hip; decidua; myometrium; urethra / Top expressed in: internal carotid artery; ascending aorta; Ileal epithelium; Paneth cell; external carotid artery; semi-lunar valve; aortic valve; carotid body; endothelial cell of lymphatic vessel; tunica media of zone of aorta; More reference expression data
BioGPS	n/a
Gene ontology
Molecular function	molecular function
Cellular component	ruffle; integral component of membrane; membrane raft; plasma membrane; membrane; cell-cell junction; cortical actin cytoskeleton
Biological process	establishment of endothelial barrier; negative regulation of protein phosphorylation; negative regulation of protein kinase C signaling; positive regulation of substrate adhesion-dependent cell spreading; cell-cell junction maintenance; membrane raft organization; negative regulation of heterotypic cell-cell adhesion; regulation of cell-substrate adhesion; negative regulation of actin filament polymerization; negative regulation of gene expression; positive regulation of cell migration; protein localization to plasma membrane
Sources:Amigo / QuickGO
Orthologs
Databases	NCBI: entry; OMA: entry
Species	Human	Mouse
Entrez	91663	50918
Ensembl	ENSG00000179820	ENSMUSG00000068566
UniProt	Q96S97	O35682
RefSeq (mRNA)	NM_138373; NM_001020818; NM_001020819; NM_001020820; NM_001020821 NM_001290188; NM_001290189; NM_001290190; NM_001290191; NM_001290192; NM_001290193; NM_001290194	NM_001093764; NM_001093765; NM_001093766; NM_016969
RefSeq (protein)	NP_001018654; NP_001018655; NP_001018656; NP_001018657; NP_001277117 NP_001277118; NP_001277119; NP_001277120; NP_001277121; NP_001277122; NP_001277123; NP_612382	NP_001087233; NP_001087234; NP_001087235; NP_058665
Location (UCSC)	Chr 19: 53.86 – 53.88 Mb	Chr 7: 3.34 – 3.35 Mb
PubMed search
- Wikidata
View/Edit Human	View/Edit Mouse

Myeloid-associated differentiation marker is a protein that in humans is encoded by the MYADM gene. It is the receptor by which human parechovirus enters cells.
