= Njurunda =

- Village
- Location of Njurunda in Västernorrland County
- Coordinates: 62°16′08″N 17°22′26″E
- Country: Sweden

Area
  - Land: 2,162.3 km^{2} (834.9 sq mi)

Population
  - Total: 13,905
  - Density: 6.4307/km^{2} (16.655/sq mi)
- Time zone: UTC+1
- Area code: 7600

Njurunda (Swedish pronunciation: [ˈnjʉ̂ːˌrɵnːda]) is a small village in Sundsvall Municipality, located in Västernorrland County, Sweden. The village is situated at the mouth of the Ljungan river and located about 17 kilometers south of Sundsvall. It is primarily a sleeper town for Sundsvall, with a residential population of about 5,000 households and about 450 small to medium-sized businesses. The elementary school is Kyrkmons skola, which has about 339 students, most of whom head on to Kvissleby and Nivrenaskolan for their 7th - 9th grades before they finally move on to the secondary schools in Sundsvall.

The town was the seat of the former Nivren rural municipality, which later was swallowed by Sundsvall municipality in the consolidation process during the 1960s. Historically, there have been people living in Njurunda since the 5th century. The population, however, did not grow significantly until the 14th century, but late that century the Black Death halted this growth. Industrialization began around 1830 when several saw mills were established close to the Ljungan, which was used to float logs out to the coast.

The Njurunda area is also home to the ruins of a 12th-century church.

== Notable persons ==
- Fredrik Modin – Hockey player
- Henrik Zetterberg – Hockey player
- Lars Dahlqvist – Skier
- Fredrik Wikingsson – Journalist
- Sebastian Lauritzen – Hockey player
- Mathias Månsson – Hockey player

== See also ==
- Njurunda Court District
