= Fanbyn =

- Location within Västernorrland Location within Sweden
- Coordinates: 62°25′N 16°35′E
- Country: Sweden
- Province: Medelpad
- County: Västernorrland County
- Municipality: Sundsvall Municipality

Area
  - Total: 1.40 km^{2} (0.54 sq mi)

Population (31 December 2010)
  - Total: 526
  - Density: 376/km^{2} (970/sq mi)
- Time zone: UTC+1 (CET)
  - Summer (DST): UTC+2 (CEST)
- Climate: Dfc

Fanbyn is a locality situated in Sundsvall Municipality, Västernorrland County, Sweden with 526 inhabitants in 2010.
