= Lars Dahlqvist =

Swedish Nordic combined skier

Lars Dahlqvist (October 26, 1935, Njurunda – November 10, 1969) was a Swedish Nordic combined skier who competed in the 1960s. He finished eighth in the Nordic combined event at the 1960 Winter Olympics in Squaw Valley.

Dahlqvist was born and died in Njurunda.
