= Select-TV =

Select-TV Solutions Sdn Bhd
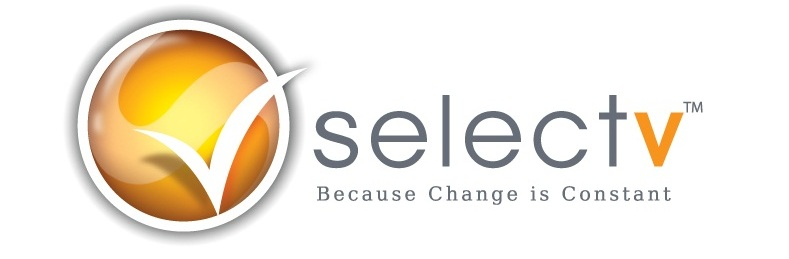
- Industry: Information Technology
- Headquarters: Kuala Lumpur, Malaysia
- Website: www.selectv.com.my

Select-TV is a Malaysian based company specializing in the IPTV (Internet Protocol television) technology for the hospitality and telecommunication sectors. Since its inception, it has delivered several IPTV projects to the Middle East and South East Asian region. Although the current company was incorporated in 2007 after a group restructuring, its development of IPTV for hospitality began since 2000. The company originally used Microsoft Windows platform for its set top boxes during its initial stage of product development. However, due to costs, it later developed the second version on Linux.

Among notable clients of Select-TV's IPTV for hotels are the Armani Hotel in Burj Khalifa in Dubai, Emirates Palace and Yas Marina Circuit in Abu Dhabi, Kempinski Residences and Suites in Doha, Lebua at State Tower Hotel in Bangkok, as well as Star Cruises' cruise ship SuperStar Virgo.

In 2009, Select-TV began the development of EMAGINE, the home-use version of its IPTV system. The system is currently deployed to their clients in several countries including Singapore and Thailand. EMAGINE is a box which incorporates over-the-top concept than a pure IPTV.

== Technology ==
Select-TV's development was based on Intel's x86 platform initially using Via Technologies' chipset and when Intel Atom became available, the company switched to the latter. Future hardware for Select-TV's set-top boxes are being planned with Intel CE4100 for its video decoding capabilities.

== Awards ==
In 2006, the company won the Prime Minister's "Best of the Best" award from MSC Malaysia APICTA (Asia Pacific Information Technology Award), awarded by the then Prime Minister of Malaysia, Abdullah Ahmad Badawi.

== Investors ==
Select-TV has raised venture capital funds from Intel Capital Corporation and Malaysian Venture Capital Berhad in 2010.

In January 2011, the company announced that it was going to invest MYR30 million under the Economic Transformation Programme to set up its IPTV system, initiated by the Malaysian government's Performance Management and Delivery Unit (PEMANDU). The project stipulates that the company set up its CXS in hotels in the South East Asia, and beam Malaysian content into these hotels in order to promote Malaysia-made content to neighboring countries.

== Developments ==
Below are the phases of development that Select-TV has gone through up to today:

Period	Development
End of 2005	Began the development of the company's IPTV solution, CXS, using Linux platform
June 2006	Completion of the first phase of development of CXS. At the same time its commercialization was started
December 2006	Won APICTA “Best of the Best” Prime Minister’s Award for CXS
March 2007	Select-TV restructured to concentrate on IPTV business
December 2007	Secured IPTV contract for deployment to Emirates Palace, one of the most exclusive hotels in the world in Abu Dhabi, United Arab Emirates
June 2008	Began the development for CXS Version 3
June 2008	Obtained first round of funding from angels and Cubic Electronics Sdn Bhd
Jan 2009	Commenced development of IPTV for home, which was later branded as “EMAGINE”
Feb 2009	Completed the development of CXS Version 3
March 2009	Secured contract for IPTV for Burj Khalifa’s Armani Hotel
September 2009	EMAGINE 1st version fully completed
October 2009	Secured investment from Malaysian Venture Capital Management
November 2009	Completed the IPTV for the Yas Marina project, just before the final race for the 2009 F1 in Abu Dhabi
September 2010	Secured another round of funding from Intel Capital Corporation
February 2011	EMAGINE incorporating over-the-top IPTV was completed for both the hospitality sector
November 2011	Secured first Hospital IPTV projects with Bangkok Hospital and the Sime Darby Medical Centre

== Home Market ==
Select-TV launched EMAGINE for the home market in July 2011. Select-TV's EMAGINE over-the-top media centre's idea is to bring a better experience to consumers. Transforming the TV screen into a platform for content delivery and interactive services, EMAGINE allows operators to create new businesses or leverage on existing market base to increase revenue per user (ARPU). Unlike AppleTV, EMAGINE is designed and built to support internet standards such as JAVA and Adobe Flash to ensure users abilities to adapt the solution to their business needs faster than any other common set top boxes in the market. EMAGINE is able to support formats such as MPEG2, MPEG4, H.264, AVI, MKV, etc. in high definition 1080P. For music, it is able to support formats such as MP3, WAV and OGG.

The concept for EMAGINE by Select-TV is that it is VAS enabled to allow Value added services such as eCommerce. Hence, to telcos it is not just a media player but allows interactivity between the service provider and consumers.

Units for its first version comes with HDMI input / output, 3 USB port, 1 slot for SD card reader, 1 GB DDR3 memory. Consumers can opt for built in Hard Disc Drive if they purchase online. On January 31, 2012, the UF Group announced that in partnering with Select-TV, they are deploying 90,000 of the EMAGINE boxes to homes around the world with India being the initial target market.

== See also ==
- IPTV
- Internet Television
- Hotel television systems
- Catch up TV
- Video on demand
- x86
- Set-top boxes
- over-the-top
- Smart TV
