= Sidsjö-Böle IF =

Swedish football club

- Full name: Sidsjö-Böle Idrottsförening
- Founded: 1957
- Ground: Sidsjövallen; Sundsvall; Sweden
- Chairman: Assar Hörnell
- League: Division 4 Medelpad
Home colours

Sidsjö-Böle IF is a Swedish football club located in Sundsvall.

== Background ==
Sidsjö-Böle IF currently plays in Division 4 Medelpad which is the sixth tier of Swedish football. They play their home matches at the Sidsjövallen in Sundsvall.

The club is affiliated to Medelpads Fotbollförbund.

== Season to season ==
Season	Level	Division	Section	Position	Movements
1999	Tier 6	Division 5	Medelpad	3rd	Promoted
2000	Tier 5	Division 4	Medelpad	6th	
2001	Tier 5	Division 4	Medelpad	4th	
2002	Tier 5	Division 4	Medelpad	7th	
2003	Tier 5	Division 4	Medelpad	7th	
2004	Tier 5	Division 4	Medelpad	9th	
2005	Tier 5	Division 4	Medelpad	4th	
2006*	Tier 6	Division 4	Medelpad	4th	
2007	Tier 6	Division 4	Medelpad	2nd	
2008	Tier 6	Division 4	Medelpad	10th	
2009	Tier 6	Division 4	Medelpad	11th	Relegated
2005	Tier 7	Division 5	Medelpad	3rd	Promoted
2011	Tier 6	Division 4	Medelpad	11th	

* League restructuring in 2006 resulted in a new division being created at Tier 3 and subsequent divisions dropping a level.
