= Indal =

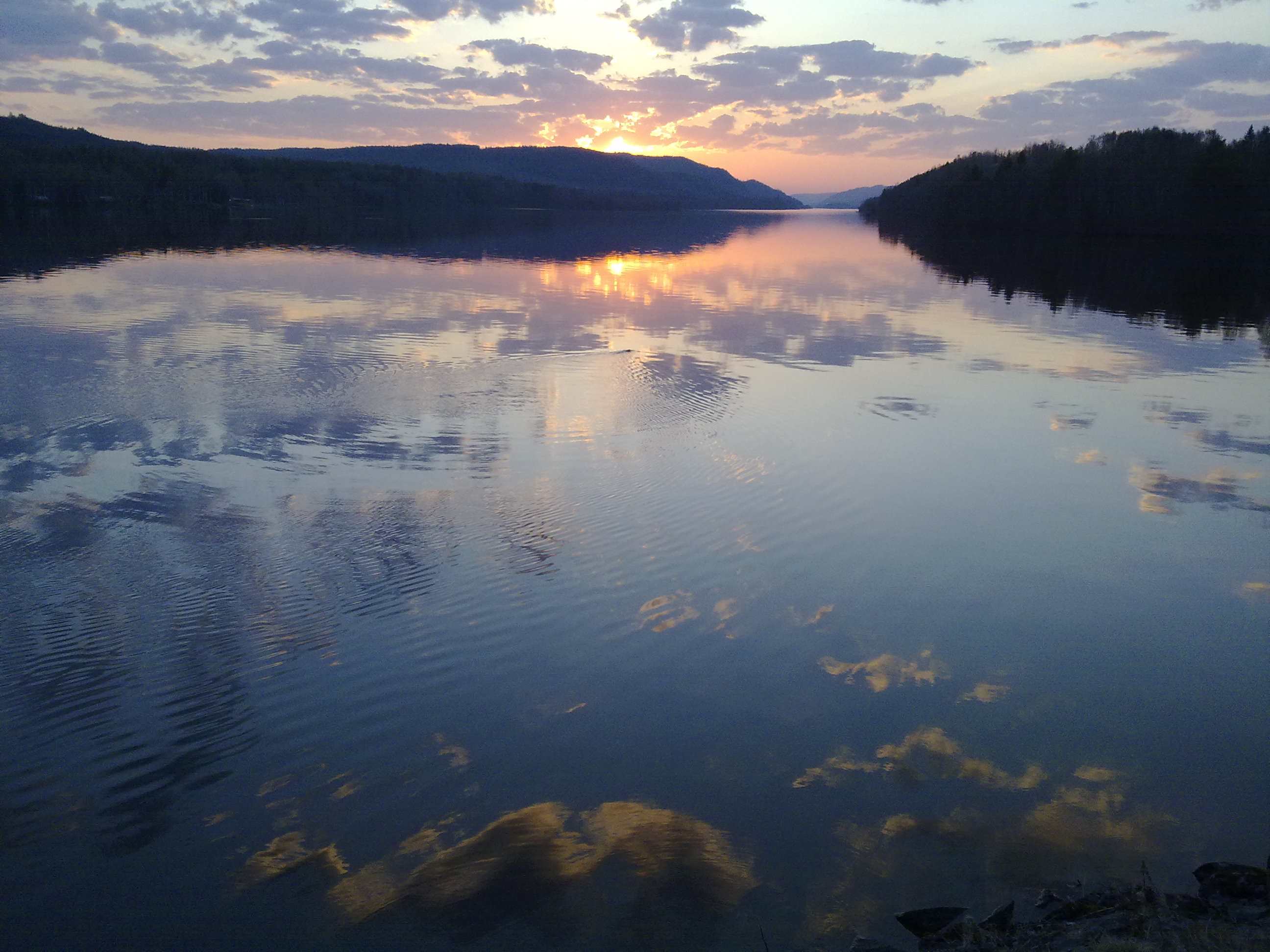
- A beaver in Indalsälven in Indal

- Location within Västernorrland Location within Sweden
- Coordinates: 62°34′N 17°06′E
- Country: Sweden
- Province: Medelpad
- County: Västernorrland County
- Municipality: Sundsvall Municipality

Area
  - Total: 0.93 km^{2} (0.36 sq mi)

Population (2015)
  - Total: 949
  - Density: 711/km^{2} (1,840/sq mi)
- Time zone: UTC+1 (CET)
  - Summer (DST): UTC+2 (CEST)
- Climate: Dfc

Indal is a locality situated in Sundsvall Municipality, Västernorrland County, Sweden with 949 inhabitants in 2015. It is located close to the river Indalsälven.
