= Lucksta =

- Location within Västernorrland Location within Sweden
- Coordinates: 62°18′N 17°03′E
- Country: Sweden
- Province: Medelpad
- County: Västernorrland County
- Municipality: Sundsvall Municipality

Area
  - Total: 0.36 km^{2} (0.14 sq mi)

Population (31 December 2010)
  - Total: 346
  - Density: 971/km^{2} (2,510/sq mi)
- Time zone: UTC+1 (CET)
  - Summer (DST): UTC+2 (CEST)

Lucksta is a locality situated in Sundsvall Municipality, Västernorrland County, Sweden with 346 inhabitants in 2010.

== Sports ==
The following sports clubs are located in Lucksta:

- Lucksta IF
