= Kvissleby =

- Location within Västernorrland Location within Sweden
- Coordinates: 62°18′N 17°23′E
- Country: Sweden
- Province: Medelpad
- County: Västernorrland County
- Municipality: Sundsvall Municipality

Area
  - Total: 1.89 km^{2} (0.73 sq mi)

Population (31 December 2010)
  - Total: 2,614
  - Density: 1,381/km^{2} (3,580/sq mi)
- Time zone: UTC+1 (CET)
  - Summer (DST): UTC+2 (CEST)

Kvissleby is a locality situated in Sundsvall Municipality, Västernorrland County, Sweden with 2,614 inhabitants in 2010.

== Sports ==
The following sports clubs are located in Kvissleby:

- Svartviks IF
