= Njurundabommen =

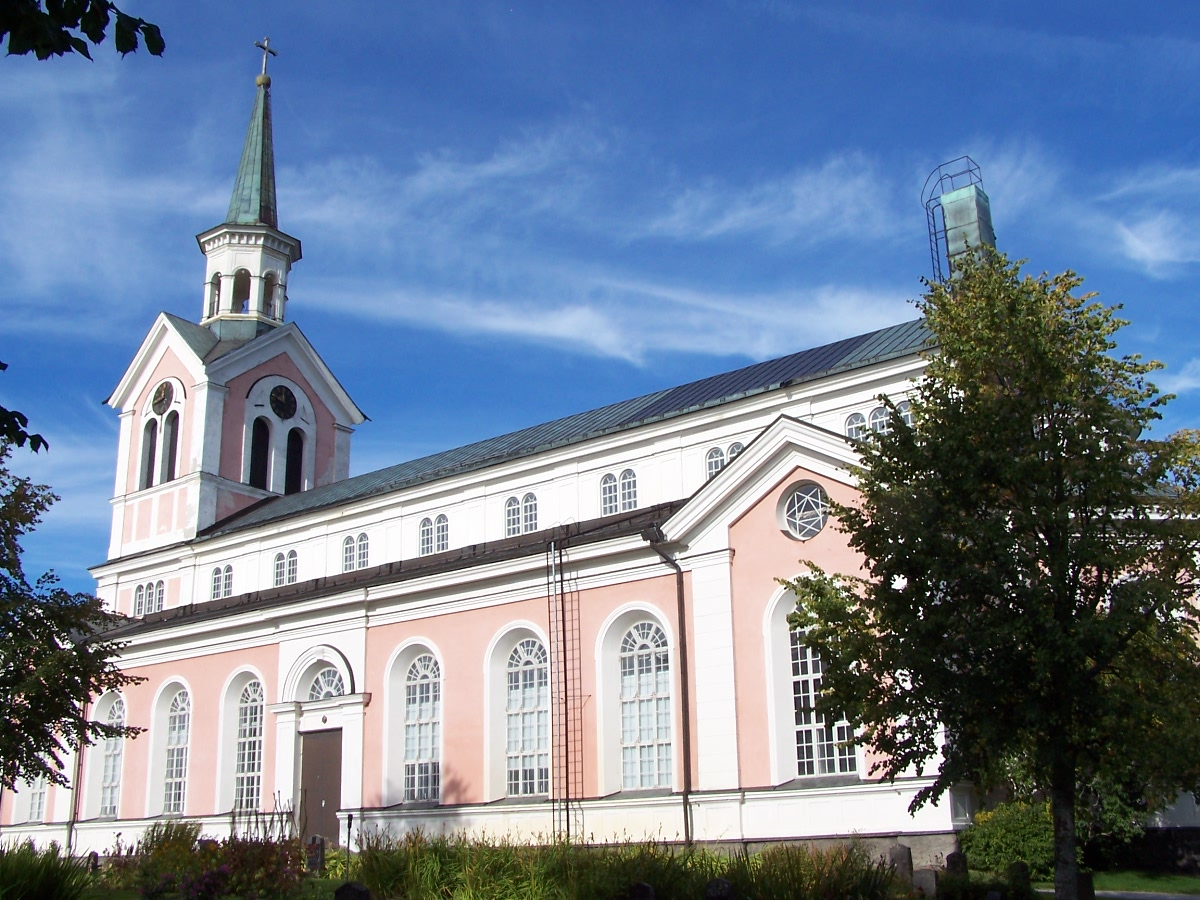
- Njurunda Church in September 2005

- Location within Västernorrland Location within Sweden
- Coordinates: 62°16′N 17°23′E
- Country: Sweden
- Province: Medelpad
- County: Västernorrland County
- Municipality: Sundsvall Municipality

Area
  - Total: 2.16 km^{2} (0.83 sq mi)

Population (2023)
  - Total: 2,752
  - Density: 1,270/km^{2} (3,300/sq mi)
- Time zone: UTC+1 (CET)
  - Summer (DST): UTC+2 (CEST)

Njurundabommen is a locality situated in Sundsvall Municipality, Västernorrland County, Sweden with 2,752 inhabitants in 2023.
