= Brämön =

Island in Västernorrland County, Sweden

Coordinates: 62°13′0″N 17°42′0″E

Brämön (Swedish pronunciation: [ˈbrêːmœn]) is an island in Sundsvall Municipality, Västernorrland County, Sweden.

Brämön is about 5 km long and 3 km wide, with an area of about 11 km^{2}. It is situated in the Bothnian Sea, separated from the mainland by the approximately 2 km wide Brämösundet. A small island named Kalven just lies just off Brämön in the south.

Brämön had already been known for fishing in the 15th century. The last fisherman left the island in 1949.

There are two inhabited places in Brämön, namely Sanna and Norrhamn. The two places are connected by a footpath. A nature reserve was established in 2004, which includes the island except Sanna and Norrhamn.

Brämön was spelled as Bremön. The old spelling is still used by many.

== Climate ==
Brämön, being an island close to the mainland near Sundsvall has got a maritime climate, with significantly milder winters as well as cooler summers when compared to mainland Sweden and Finland at the same latitude. Its Köppen classification is either Dfb or Cfb depending on whether a −3 °C or 0 °C isotherm is used.

Climate data for Brämön 2002-2018
Month	Jan	Feb	Mar	Apr	May	Jun	Jul	Aug	Sep	Oct	Nov	Dec	Year
Record high °C (°F)	9.3 (48.7)	10.0 (50.0)	15.4 (59.7)	21.8 (71.2)	26.8 (80.2)	26.7 (80.1)	33.1 (91.6)	27.9 (82.2)	23.4 (74.1)	18.1 (64.6)	14.2 (57.6)	10.2 (50.4)	33.1 (91.6)
Mean daily maximum °C (°F)	−0.1 (31.8)	−0.1 (31.8)	2.8 (37.0)	6.6 (43.9)	11.7 (53.1)	15.7 (60.3)	19.4 (66.9)	18.6 (65.5)	14.6 (58.3)	8.4 (47.1)	4.2 (39.6)	1.7 (35.1)	8.6 (47.5)
Mean daily minimum °C (°F)	−4.5 (23.9)	−4.6 (23.7)	−2.3 (27.9)	1.0 (33.8)	5.1 (41.2)	9.9 (49.8)	14.1 (57.4)	13.6 (56.5)	9.6 (49.3)	4.3 (39.7)	0.5 (32.9)	−2.7 (27.1)	3.7 (38.6)
Record low °C (°F)	−22.8 (−9.0)	−25.7 (−14.3)	−18.6 (−1.5)	−9.1 (15.6)	−1.7 (28.9)	3.7 (38.7)	8.7 (47.7)	5.8 (42.4)	0.6 (33.1)	−7.1 (19.2)	−12.7 (9.1)	−18.9 (−2.0)	−25.7 (−14.3)
Average precipitation mm (inches)	32 (1.3)	20 (0.8)	18 (0.7)	25 (1.0)	38 (1.5)	47 (1.9)	54 (2.1)	70 (2.8)	47 (1.9)	51 (2.0)	45 (1.8)	44 (1.7)	489 (19.3)
Source: SMHI Open Data
