= Vattjom =

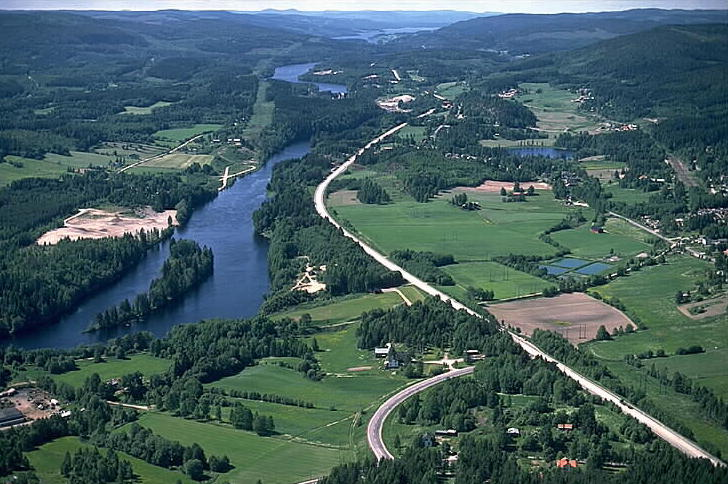
- Vattjom Rude

- Location within Västernorrland Location within Sweden
- Coordinates: 62°22′N 17°00′E
- Country: Sweden
- Province: Medelpad
- County: Västernorrland County
- Municipality: Sundsvall Municipality

Area
  - Total: 0.92 km^{2} (0.36 sq mi)

Population (31 December 2010)
  - Total: 477
  - Density: 519/km^{2} (1,340/sq mi)
- Time zone: UTC+1 (CET)
  - Summer (DST): UTC+2 (CEST)

Vattjom (Swedish pronunciation: [ˈvâtːjɔm]) is a locality situated in Sundsvall Municipality, Västernorrland County, Sweden with 477 inhabitants in 2010.
