= Svartviks IF =

Swedish football club

- Full name: Svartviks Idrottsförening
- Founded: 1894
- Ground: Stadium; Kvissleby; Sweden
- Chairman: Leif Viklund
- League: Division 4 Medelpad
Home colours	Away colours

Svartviks IF is a Swedish football club located in Kvissleby.

== Background ==
Svartviks IF currently plays in Division 4 Medelpad which is the sixth tier of Swedish football. They play their home matches at the Stadium in Kvissleby.

The club is affiliated to Medelpads Fotbollförbund.

== Season to season ==
In their most successful period Svartviks IF competed in the following divisions:

Season	Level	Division	Section	Position	Movements
1963	Tier 4	Division 4	Härjedalen-Medelpad	2nd	Promoted
1964	Tier 3	Division 3	Södra Norrland Nedre	8th	
1965	Tier 3	Division 3	Södra Norrland Nedre	6th	
1966	Tier 3	Division 3	Södra Norrland Nedre	5th	
1967	Tier 3	Division 3	Södra Norrland Nedre	6th	
1968	Tier 3	Division 3	Södra Norrland Nedre	11th	Relegated
1969	Tier 4	Division 4	Medelpad-Härjedalen	5th	

In recent seasons Svartviks IF have competed in the following divisions:

Season	Level	Division	Section	Position	Movements
1999	Tier 5	Division 4	Medelpad	7th	
2000	Tier 5	Division 4	Medelpad	12th	
2001	Tier 5	Division 4	Medelpad	6th	
2002	Tier 5	Division 4	Medelpad	4th	
2003	Tier 5	Division 4	Medelpad	6th	
2004	Tier 5	Division 4	Medelpad	10th	
2005	Tier 5	Division 4	Medelpad	1st	Promoted
2006*	Tier 5	Division 3	Mellersta Norrland	8th	
2007	Tier 5	Division 3	Mellersta Norrland	2nd	Promotion Playoffs
2008	Tier 8	Division 6	Medelpad A	1st	Promoted
2009	Tier 7	Division 5	Medelpad	1st	Promoted
2010	Tier 6	Division 4	Medelpad	5th	
2011	Tier 6	Division 4	Medelpad	10th	

* League restructuring in 2006 resulted in a new division being created at Tier 3 and subsequent divisions dropping a level.
