= Stockvik =

- Location within Västernorrland Location within Sweden
- Coordinates: 62°20′N 17°22′E
- Country: Sweden
- Province: Medelpad
- County: Västernorrland County
- Municipality: Sundsvall Municipality

Area
  - Total: 2.28 km^{2} (0.88 sq mi)

Population (31 December 2010)
  - Total: 2,359
  - Density: 1,034/km^{2} (2,680/sq mi)
- Time zone: UTC+1 (CET)
  - Summer (DST): UTC+2 (CEST)

Stockvik is a locality situated in Sundsvall Municipality, Västernorrland County, Sweden with 2,359 inhabitants in 2010.
