= Njurunda Church =

Coordinates: 62.2571°N 17.3746°E

- Njurunda kyrka
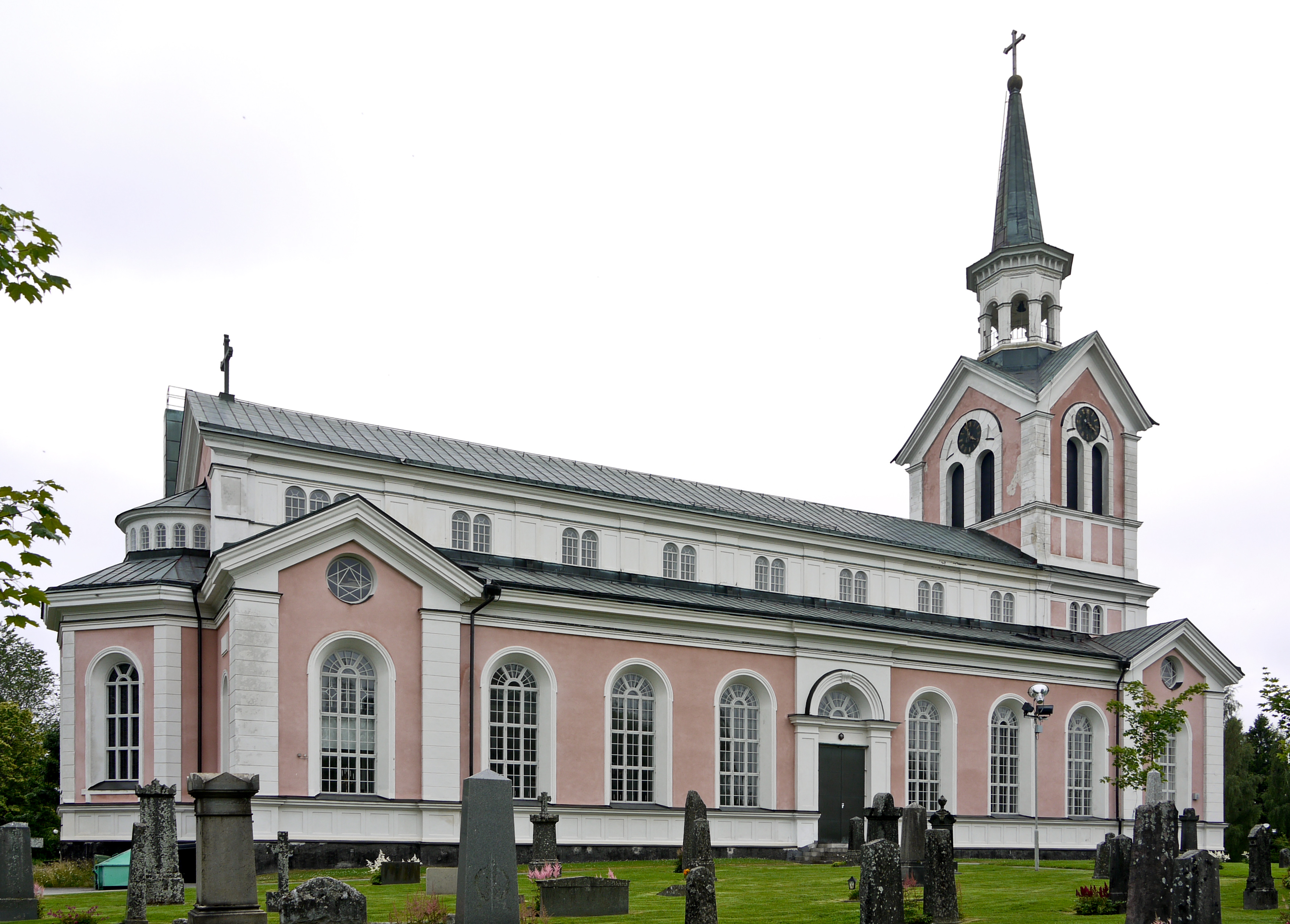
- Njurunda Church in June 2006
- Njurunda Church
- Location: Njurundabommen
- Country: Sweden
- Denomination: Church of Sweden

History
- Consecrated: 13 April 1865

Administration
- Diocese: Härnösand
- Parish: Njurunda

The Njurunda Church (Swedish: Njurunda kyrka) is a church building in Njurundabommen, Sweden. Belonging to the Njurunda Parish of the Church of Sweden, it was opened on 13 April 1865 by bishop Anders Fredrik Beckman .
