= Medelpads Fotbollförbund =

Association football district association in Sweden

- Abbreviation: Medelpads FF
- Formation: 1 July 1933
- Purpose: District Football Association
- Headquarters: Nordichallen
- Location(s): Box 890 85124 Sundsvall Västernorrland County Sweden
- Chairman: Magdalena Wallgren
- Website: http://medelpad.svenskfotboll.se/

The Medelpads Fotbollförbund (Medelpad Football Association) is one of the 24 district organisations of the Swedish Football Association. It administers lower tier football in the historical province of Medelpad in Norrland.

It was established on 1 July 1933, when Västernorrland County Football Association was disbanded, and split into the Medelpad Football Association and the Ångermanland Football Association.

== Background ==
Medelpads Fotbollförbund, commonly referred to as Medelpads FF, is the governing body for football historical province of Medelpad, now within Västernorrland County. The Association currently has 46 member clubs. Based in Sundsvall, the Association's Chairman is Magdalena Wallgren.

== Affiliated members ==
The following clubs are affiliated to the Medelpads FF:

- Alby FF
- Alnö BK
- Alnö IF
- Bybergets IK
- Erikslunds SK
- Essviks AIF
- Fränsta IK
- GIF Sundsvall
- Granlo BK
- Hassels IF
- Heffnersklubbans BK
- Heffners-Ortvikens IF
- Holms SK
- IFK Sundsvall
- IFK Timrå
- Indals IF
- Kungsnäs FC
- Kovlands IF
- Kubikenborgs IF
- Ljunga IF
- Ljustorps IF
- Lucksta IF
- Matfors IF
- Medskogsbrons BK
- Naggens IK
- Nedansjö IK
- Njurunda IK
- Njurunda SK
- Selånger FK
- Selånger FKU
- Sidsjö-Böle IF
- Söders BK
- Söråkers FF
- Stockviks FF
- Stöde IF
- Sund IF
- Sundsvall Norra FF
- Sundsvalls DFF
- Sundsvalls FF
- Sundsvalls FK
- Svartviks IF
- Team Heffners FF
- Torpshammars IF
- Västra United FC
- Viskans IF
- Ånge IF
- Östavalls IF

== League competitions ==
Medelpads FF run the following League Competitions:

=== Men's football ===
Division 4 - one section
Division 5 - one section
Division 6 - one section

=== Women's football ===
Division 3 - one section
Division 4 - one section
