= Ljungan =

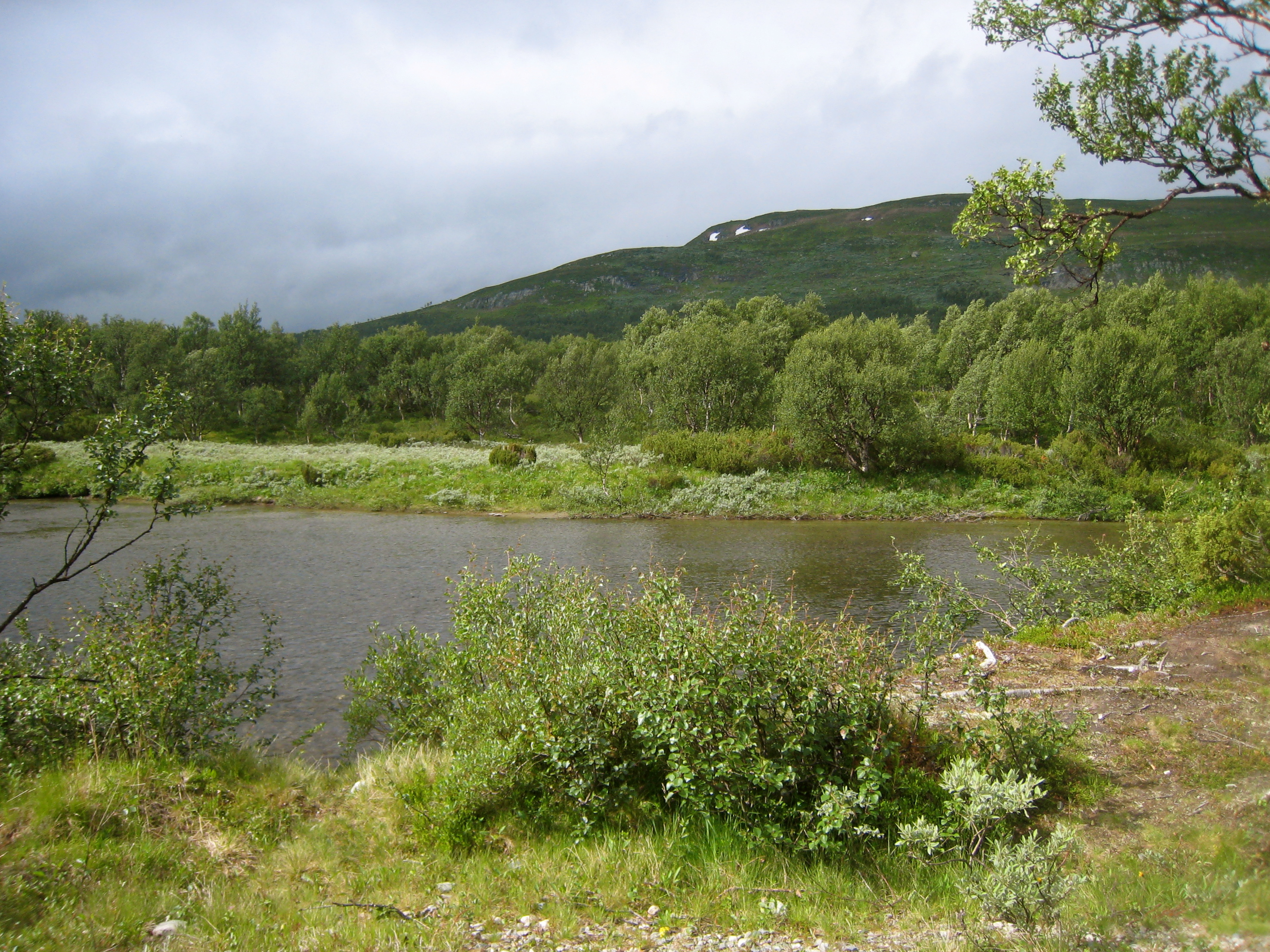

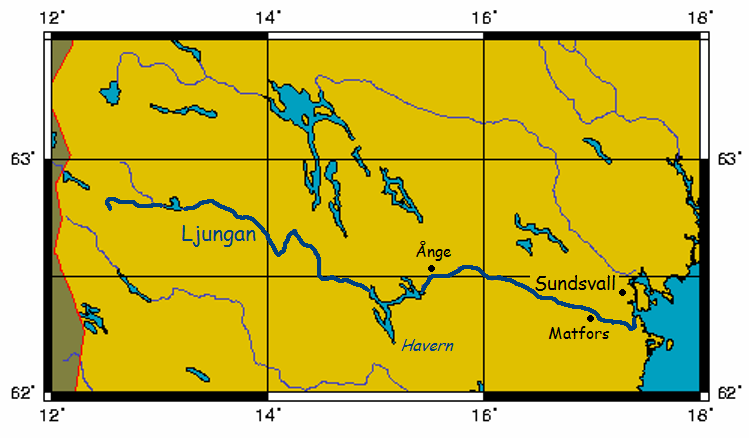

Location
- Country: Sweden

Physical characteristics
- Mouth: Bothnian Sea
  - coordinates: 62°19′N 17°23′E
  - elevation: 0 m (0 ft)
- Length: 350 km (220 mi)
- Basin size: 12,851.1 km^{2} (4,961.8 sq mi)
- Discharge
  - average: 140 m^{3}/s (4,900 cu ft/s)
  - maximum: 850 m^{3}/s (30,000 cu ft/s)

Ljungan (Jamtlandic: Jångna or Aoa, from Old Norse *Oghn "the dreadful") is a 322 kilometer long river in Sweden. It originates near Trondheim and the Norwegian border. The river runs through the Swedish counties of Jämtland and Västernorrland. Several hydropower plants are located along the river.

A pathogenic virus of the viral family which includes polio and hepatitis A was isolated from a bank vole near the Ljungan river in the mid-1990s, and named Ljungan virus.

Some towns near or by the river are:

- Matfors
- Njurunda
- Ånge
