= Parechovirus =

Virus classification
- (unranked): Virus
- Realm: Riboviria
- Kingdom: Orthornavirae
- Phylum: Pisuviricota
- Class: Pisoniviricetes
- Order: Picornavirales
- Family: Picornaviridae
- Subfamily: Paavivirinae
- Genus: Parechovirus

Genus of viruses

Parechovirus is a genus of viruses in the family Picornaviridae. Humans, ferrets, and various rodents serve as natural hosts. The genus contains six species. Human parechoviruses may cause gastrointestinal or respiratory illness in infants, and they have been implicated in cases of myocarditis and encephalitis.

== Taxonomy ==
Eighteen types of human parechovirus have been identified: human parechovirus 1 (HPeV1, formerly echovirus 22), human parechovirus 2 (formerly echovirus 23), and HPeV3 to HPeV18. A total of 15 genotypes are currently recognised.

=== Species ===
The genus contains the following species, listed by scientific name and followed by the common name of the species:

- Parechovirus ahumpari, Human parechovirus
- Parechovirus beljungani, Ljungan virus
- Parechovirus cebokele, Sebokele virus
- Parechovirus deferreti, Ferret parechovirus
- Parechovirus efalco, Falcon parechovirus
- Parechovirus feterobo, Gecko parechovirus

== Structure ==
Parechoviruses are non-enveloped, with icosahedral, spherical, and round geometries, and T=pseudo3 symmetry. The diameter is around 30 nm. Genomes are linear and non-segmented, around 7.3kb in length.

Genus	Structure	Symmetry	Capsid	Genomic arrangement	Genomic segmentation
Parechovirus	Icosahedral	Pseudo T=3	Non-enveloped	Linear	Monopartite

== Life cycle ==
Viral replication is cytoplasmic. Entry into the host cell is achieved by attachment of the virus to host receptors, which mediates endocytosis. Replication follows the positive stranded RNA virus replication model. Positive stranded RNA virus transcription is the method of transcription. The virus exits the host cell by lysis, and viroporins.

Genus	Host details	Tissue tropism	Entry details	Release details	Replication site	Assembly site	Transmission
Parechovirus	Humans	Respiratory tract; gastrointestinal tract	Cell receptor endocytosis	Lysis	Cytoplasm	Cytoplasm	Unknown

== Clinical information ==
Human parechoviruses cause mild, gastrointestinal or respiratory illness, but have been implicated in cases of myocarditis and encephalitis. Human parechoviruses are commonly spread and more than 95% of human cases are infected early in life, within two to five years of age. Ljungan virus has been proposed as a zoonotic virus, associated with diabetes and intrauterine fetal death in humans. However, the data regarding these features are currently limited and need to be confirmed. Parechovirus is a Biosafety Level 2 organism.

== History ==
The first parechoviruses (E22 and E23) were isolated in 1956, and recognized as a new genus in 1996. Ljungan virus was first isolated from bank voles (Myodes glareolus, formerly Clethrionomys glareolus) in the mid-1990s. Human parechovirus type 3 (HPeV3) was found in at least 20 U.S. young infants in 2014. Those numbers include a set of identical triplets from central Wisconsin, who contracted the virus and were diagnosed nearly two months later after a flurry of tests, as this was the first known case in those health systems. The 2014 outbreak is a higher number than expected, and is thought to be linked to maternal-fetal transmission.
