= Solhöjden =

Solhöjden Solhöjden
- Location within Sweden
- Coordinates: 57°53′53.64″N 14°5′15.43″E
- Country: Sweden
- County: Jönköping
- Municipalities of Sweden: Habo

Population (2010)
  - Total: 140
- Time zone: UTC+1 (CET)
  - Summer (DST): UTC+2 (CEST)

Solhöjden is a, as of SCB defined, minor locality situated in Habo Municipality in Jönköping County, Sweden. It had 140 inhabitants in 2010. (updated 8 October 2012)
