= Sundsvall Municipality =

Sundsvall Municipality Sundsvalls kommun
- Municipality
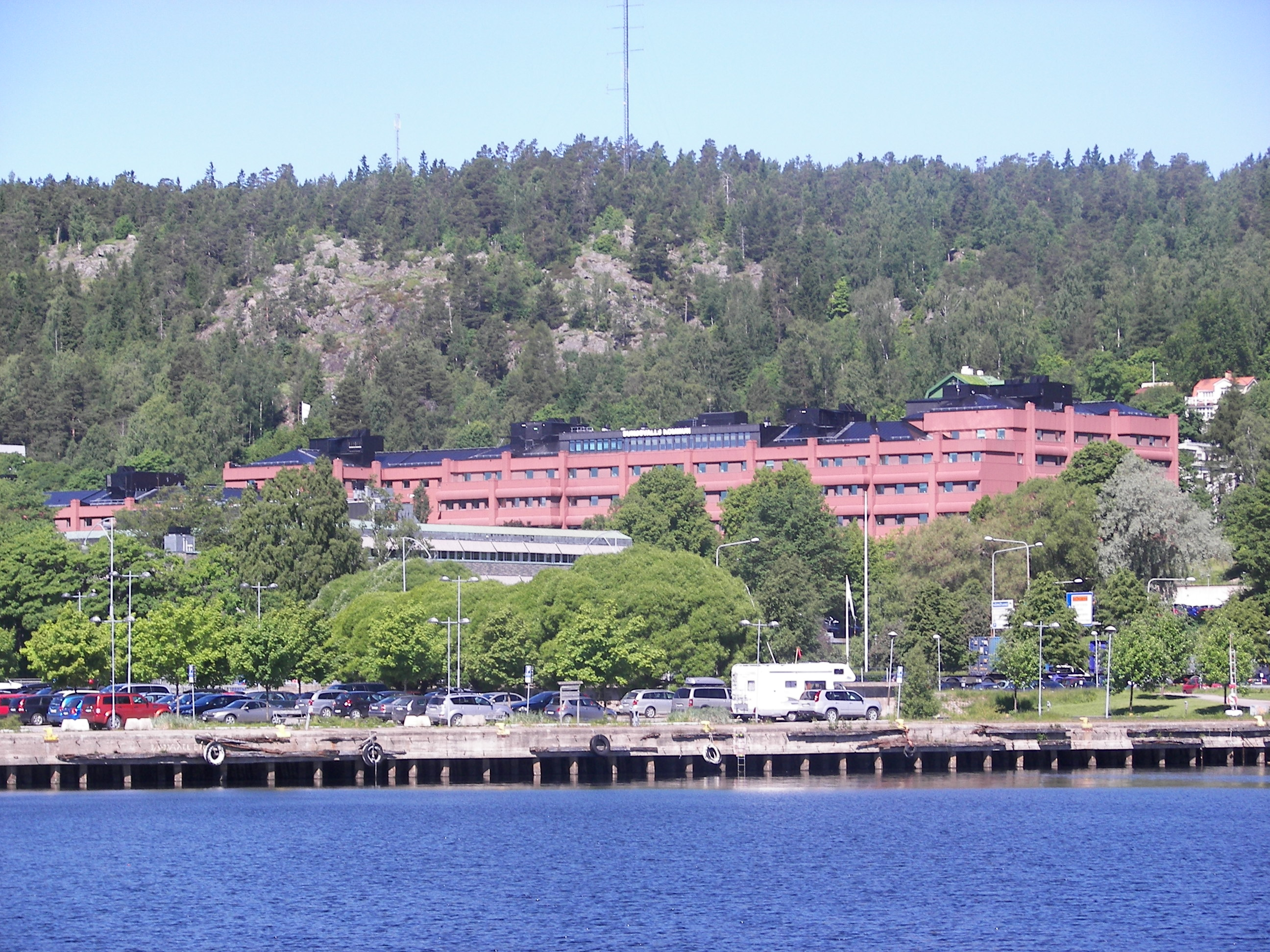
- Sundsvall town hall

- Flag Coat of arms

- Coordinates: 62°24′N 17°19′E
- Country: Sweden
- County: Västernorrland County
- Seat: Sundsvall

Area
  - Total: 4,444.54 km^{2} (1,716.05 sq mi)
  - Land: 3,189.61 km^{2} (1,231.52 sq mi)
  - Water: 1,254.93 km^{2} (484.53 sq mi)
- Area as of 1 January 2014.

Population (30 June 2025)
  - Total: 99,235
  - Density: 31.112/km^{2} (80.580/sq mi)
- Time zone: UTC+1 (CET)
  - Summer (DST): UTC+2 (CEST)
- ISO 3166 code: SE
- Province: Medelpad
- Municipal code: 2281
- Density is calculated using land area only.

Sundsvall Municipality (Swedish: Sundsvalls kommun) is a municipality in Västernorrland County, northern Sweden, where the city Sundsvall is the seat.

As most municipalities of Sweden, Sundsvalls kommun is a result of a series of amalgamations, carried out in 1952 and in the period 1965–1974. The number of original entities (existing in 1863) is thirteen.

== Localities ==
Localities with more than 200 inhabitants include:

- Vi on Alnön, 4737 (2000)
- Matfors, 3239 (2006)
- Johannedal, 2596 (2000)
- Kvissleby, 2535 (2000)
- Stockvik, 2153 (2000)
- Sundsbruk, 2080 (2000)
- Njurundabommen, 1959 (2006)
- Skottsund, 1011 (2000)
- Svartvik, 999 (2000)
- Dingersjö, 946 (2000)
- Ankarsvik, 830 (2000)
- Essvik, 810 (2000)
- Indal, 687 (2000)
- Fanbyn, 603 (2000)
- Stöde, 543 (2006)
- Vattjom, 499 (2006)
- Kovland, 449 (2000)
- Lucksta, 360 (2000)
- Tunadal, 360 (2000)
- Klingsta och Allsta, 313 (2000)
- Juniskär, 306 (2000)
- Nedansjö, 289 (2000)
- Liden, 280 (2000)
- Gustavsberg, 225 (2000)
- Hovid, 215 (2000)

== Demographics ==
This is a demographic table based on Sundsvall Municipality's electoral districts in the 2022 Swedish general election sourced from SVT's election platform, in turn taken from SCB official statistics.

In total there were 76,665 Swedish citizens of voting age resident in the municipality. 53.6% voted for the left coalition and 45.3% for the right coalition. Indicators are in percentage points except population totals and income.

Location	Residents	Citizen adults	Left vote	Right vote	Employed	Swedish parents	Foreign heritage	Income SEK	Degree
Location			%	%					
Allsta	1,365	987	48.6	50.6	90	94	6	30,902	49
Alnö N	1,656	1,213	50.2	49.1	90	96	4	32,733	49
Alnö S	2,004	1,432	52.2	47.3	88	94	6	32,367	48
Alnö Ö	1,475	1,216	51.2	47.9	89	95	5	30,861	48
Alnö-Vi N	1,824	1,382	55.6	43.6	86	93	7	30,159	50
Alnö-Vi S	1,854	1,323	58.4	40.3	78	83	17	26,207	42
Attmar	1,782	1,417	47.0	51.6	85	95	5	26,661	33
Bergsåker V	1,974	1,472	49.0	50.6	89	94	6	30,365	44
Bergsåker Ö	2,085	1,471	58.5	40.8	82	83	17	26,997	46
Birsta	1,838	1,326	52.5	47.1	81	79	21	25,688	30
Bosvedjan	2,045	1,575	56.4	43.1	88	88	12	31,519	58
Bosvedjan C	1,874	1,515	60.0	38.7	83	84	16	24,688	35
Bredsand	1,874	1,195	57.3	41.7	63	54	46	19,063	22
Bydalen	2,038	1,515	51.8	47.4	90	91	9	35,575	70
Essvik	1,910	1,418	48.9	50.0	87	93	7	30,445	46
Finsta	1,787	1,357	51.6	47.5	67	74	26	20,530	21
Granlo N	1,356	1,092	59.0	40.1	90	92	8	30,656	56
Granlo S	1,544	1,492	57.3	41.6	86	92	8	24,468	43
Granloholm M	1,625	1,257	61.9	36.5	76	80	20	24,143	36
Granloholm V	1,613	1,161	59.5	40.0	83	85	15	28,396	51
Granloholm Ö	1,837	1,411	65.1	33.7	82	85	15	28,122	53
Haga N	1,758	1,385	61.4	36.8	77	75	25	24,517	41
Haga S	1,759	1,560	52.4	47.2	90	90	10	31,098	59
Heffners	1,894	1,184	63.6	33.7	64	45	55	18,233	30
Indal	1,740	1,361	41.8	57.6	86	95	5	26,173	27
Inre hamnen	1,707	1,437	51.1	47.7	81	86	14	27,352	42
Korsta	1,799	1,371	48.2	50.7	82	79	21	26,893	38
Kubikenborg	1,649	1,269	53.1	45.8	83	82	18	26,286	33
Kvissleby	1,740	1,452	54.5	44.3	68	84	16	18,973	26
Liden-Holm	1,121	945	45.1	54.3	78	90	10	21,769	25
Ljustadalen	1,824	1,249	52.0	46.6	75	73	27	23,700	29
Matfors	1,782	1,400	56.8	42.2	84	96	4	25,230	36
Nacksta V	1,901	1,388	66.8	31.2	64	58	42	18,056	30
Nacksta Ö	2,084	1,155	68.4	28.0	56	36	64	15,519	34
Njurunda S	1,929	1,465	42.7	56.0	88	94	6	28,066	33
Njurundabommen	1,563	1,200	48.0	51.3	87	94	6	27,782	32
Nolby	1,907	1,385	51.7	47.6	87	93	7	27,577	39
Norrliden	1,680	1,548	52.1	46.5	86	90	10	29,058	56
Norrmalm	1,676	1,434	51.8	47.3	80	86	14	28,640	54
Sallyhill	1,813	1,313	60.3	38.4	82	82	18	28,529	54
Sidsjö-Böle	2,017	1,472	52.4	46.6	87	92	8	33,840	64
Skottsund	1,710	1,432	50.3	49.3	87	94	6	29,490	40
Skönsberg	1,592	1,310	58.6	40.4	79	80	20	24,361	35
Skönsmon	1,702	1,407	57.2	41.5	84	88	12	25,815	43
Stenstaden	1,655	1,517	47.7	50.8	78	80	20	26,859	43
Stöde N	1,809	1,417	48.6	50.5	82	93	7	23,435	25
Stöde S	1,135	928	50.4	48.3	85	94	6	25,322	30
Svartvik	1,582	1,113	50.9	48.0	88	87	13	30,019	47
Sättna	1,715	1,249	47.5	51.4	88	95	5	27,435	37
Södermalm N	1,674	1,508	49.3	50.0	83	86	14	27,883	46
Södermalm V	1,891	1,428	55.9	43.1	85	91	9	31,921	60
Södermalm Ö	1,837	1,467	54.5	45.0	86	92	8	29,661	49
Tuna V	1,669	1,260	55.2	43.6	87	96	4	28,936	39
Vattjom-Ängom	1,413	1,135	49.9	49.3	87	95	5	28,483	36
Västermalm N	1,663	1,494	51.2	47.5	70	80	20	24,086	56
Västermalm S	1,733	1,404	54.2	44.4	77	82	18	25,821	47
Östermalm	1,786	1,396	55.9	43.4	86	92	8	30,529	51
Source: SVT

== Islands ==
- Alnön
- Brämön

== International relations ==
=== Twin towns — Sister cities ===
- Oberá, Argentina
- Pori, Finland
- Porsgrunn, Norway
- Sønderborg, Denmark
- Volkhov, Russia
- Konin, Poland
