= Medelpad =

Historical province of Sweden

Coordinates: 62.600°N 16.250°E

- Historical province
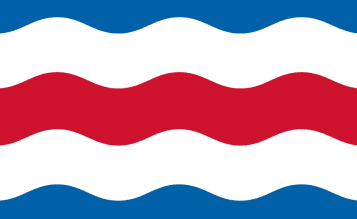
- Flag Coat of arms

- Country: Sweden
- Land: Norrland
- Counties: Västernorrland County

Area
  - Total: 7,058 km^{2} (2,725 sq mi)

Population (31 December 2023)
  - Total: 125,862
  - Density: 17.83/km^{2} (46.19/sq mi)

Ethnicity
  - Language: Swedish (North Swedish)

Culture
  - Flower: Spruce
  - Animal: Mountain hare
  - Bird: Red crossbill
  - Fish: Perch
- Time zone: UTC+1 (CET)
  - Summer (DST): UTC+2 (CEST)

Medelpad (Swedish pronunciation: [ˈmêːdɛlˌpɑːd] or [ˈměːdɛlpɑːd]) is a historical province or landskap in the north of Sweden. It borders Hälsingland, Härjedalen, Jämtland, Ångermanland and the Gulf of Bothnia.

The province is a part of Norrland and as such considered to be Northern Sweden, although the province geographically is located in the middle of Sweden. It is a common misconception that the name Medelpad ("middle land" or "middle ground") reflects this, but the name actually refers to the fact that most of the province lies between its two rivers Ljungan and Indalsälven.

== Administration ==
The traditional provinces of Sweden serve no administrative or political purposes, but are historical and cultural entities. In the case of Medelpad the province roughly comprises the southern part of the administrative county, län, Västernorrland County.

Three municipalities have their seats in Medelpad:

- Sundsvall
- Timrå
- Ånge

== Heraldry ==
The arms of Medelpad symbolises the land between the two rivers Ljungan and Indalsälven. As with other Swedish provinces, the arms can be represented showing a ducal coronet. Blazon: "Four times parted per fess wavy, Azure, Argent, Gules, Argent and Azure."

== Geography ==
The province is situated at an average altitude of 200–300 meters above sea level. The highest mountains are no more than 500 meters high—the tallest is Myckelmyrberget with 577 meters. Of the total area, circa 500 km^{2} is water. The largest lake is Holmsjön, located at 200 meters elevation, followed by Leringen, at a similar elevation.

There are also two major rivers that surround the province: Ljungan and Indalsälven.

== History ==
The only town with the historical city status was Sundsvall, which was granted the privilege in 1624. Sundsvall is still the largest city of the province, with about 50,000 inhabitants. In total, the population of Medelpad is circa 120,000.

=== Districts ===
- Indal Court District
- Ljustorp Court District
- Njurunda Court District
- Selånger Court District
- Skön Court District
- Torp Court District
- Tuna Court District

== Culture ==
The mountain hare is the provincial animal, but the Skvader, a fictional animal, was popular in the 1987 unofficial referendum to select the provincial animal.

== Sports ==
Football in the province is administered by Medelpads Fotbollförbund and currently has 40 clubs. The most successful club in Medelpad is GIF Sundsvall. GIF Sundsvall is currently playing in the second tier of Swedish football, Superettan. Both GIF Sundsvall and IFK Sundsvall has played in the highest tier of Swedish football, Allsvenskan.

Ice hockey is also popular, with Timrå IK playing in the Swedish Hockey League.
