= Stenstaden =

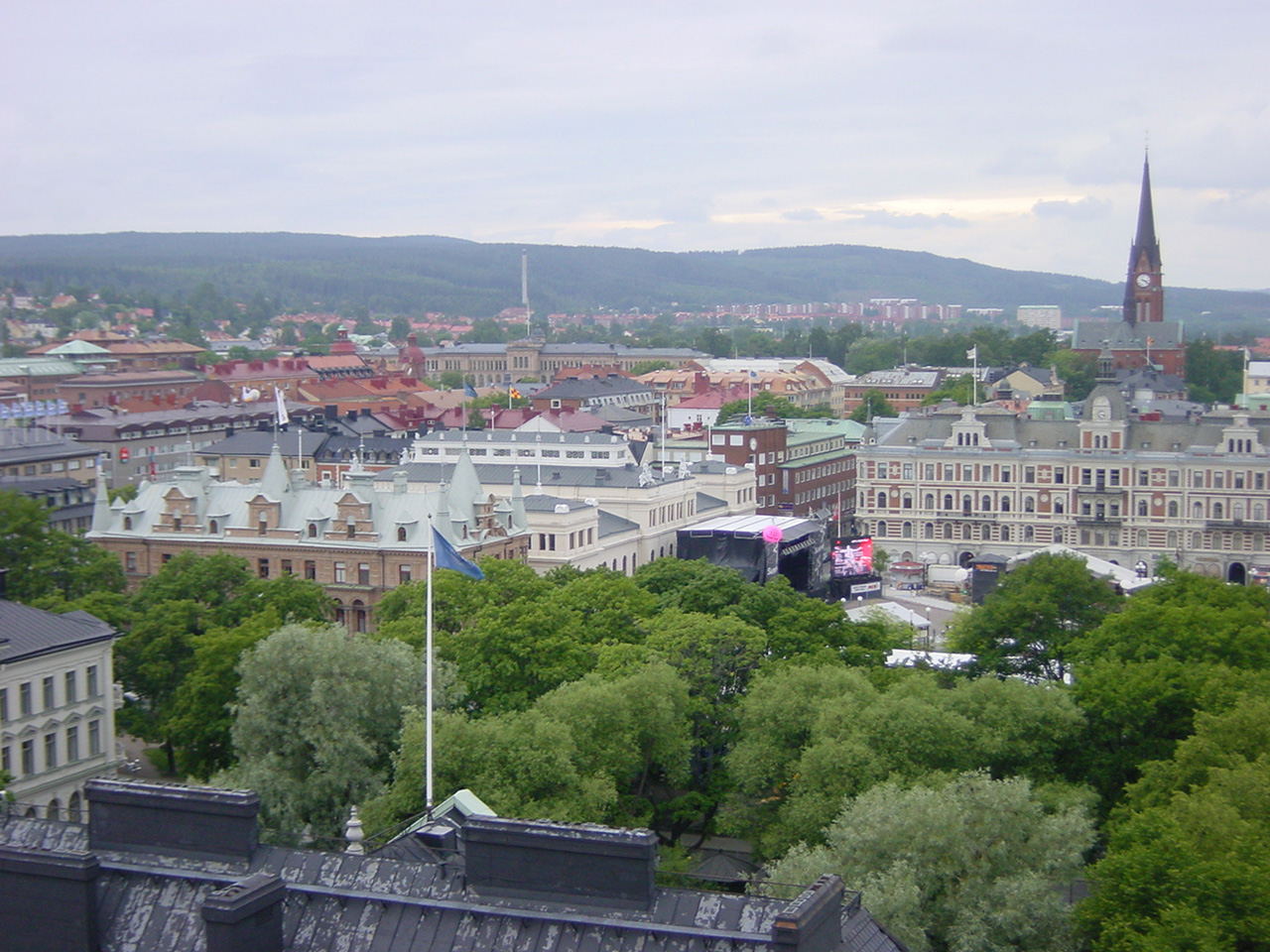

- Location in Sundsvall, Medelpad, Västernorrland County, Sweden
- Coordinates: 62°23′24″N 17°18′29″E

Stenstaden (or Stenstan), the Stone City, is the name of the historical centre of Sundsvall in Sweden. It consists of stone buildings, several of those in Art Nouveau style, which were built after the 1888 Sundsvall Fire. Stenstaden is structured in an orthogonal grid system of rectangular city blocks in the east-south-eastern part of Sundsvall.

In 2017, the Swedish NGO Architectural Uprising declared Sundsvall the most beautiful city in Sweden.

== Photo gallery ==
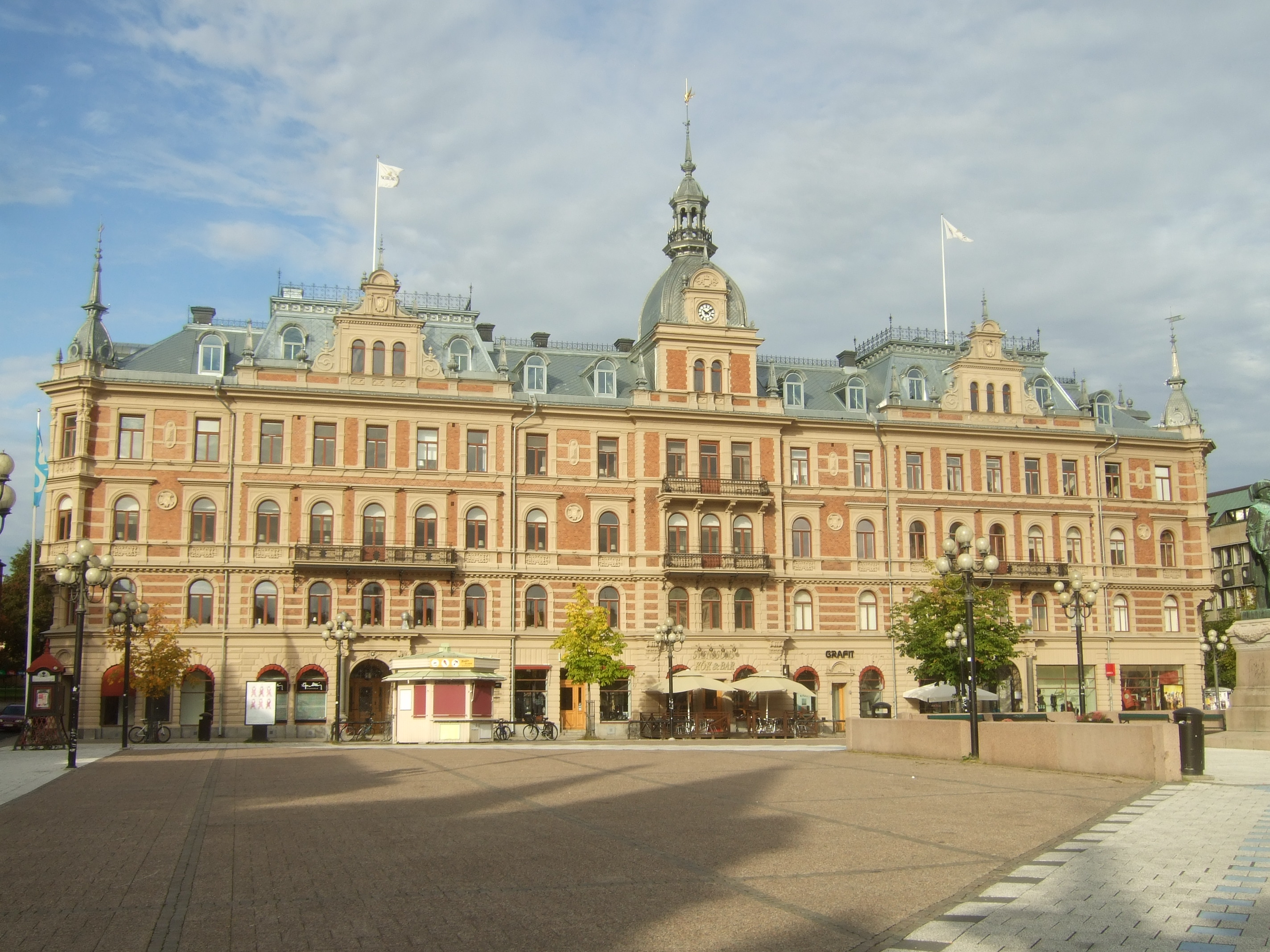
Hirschska huset

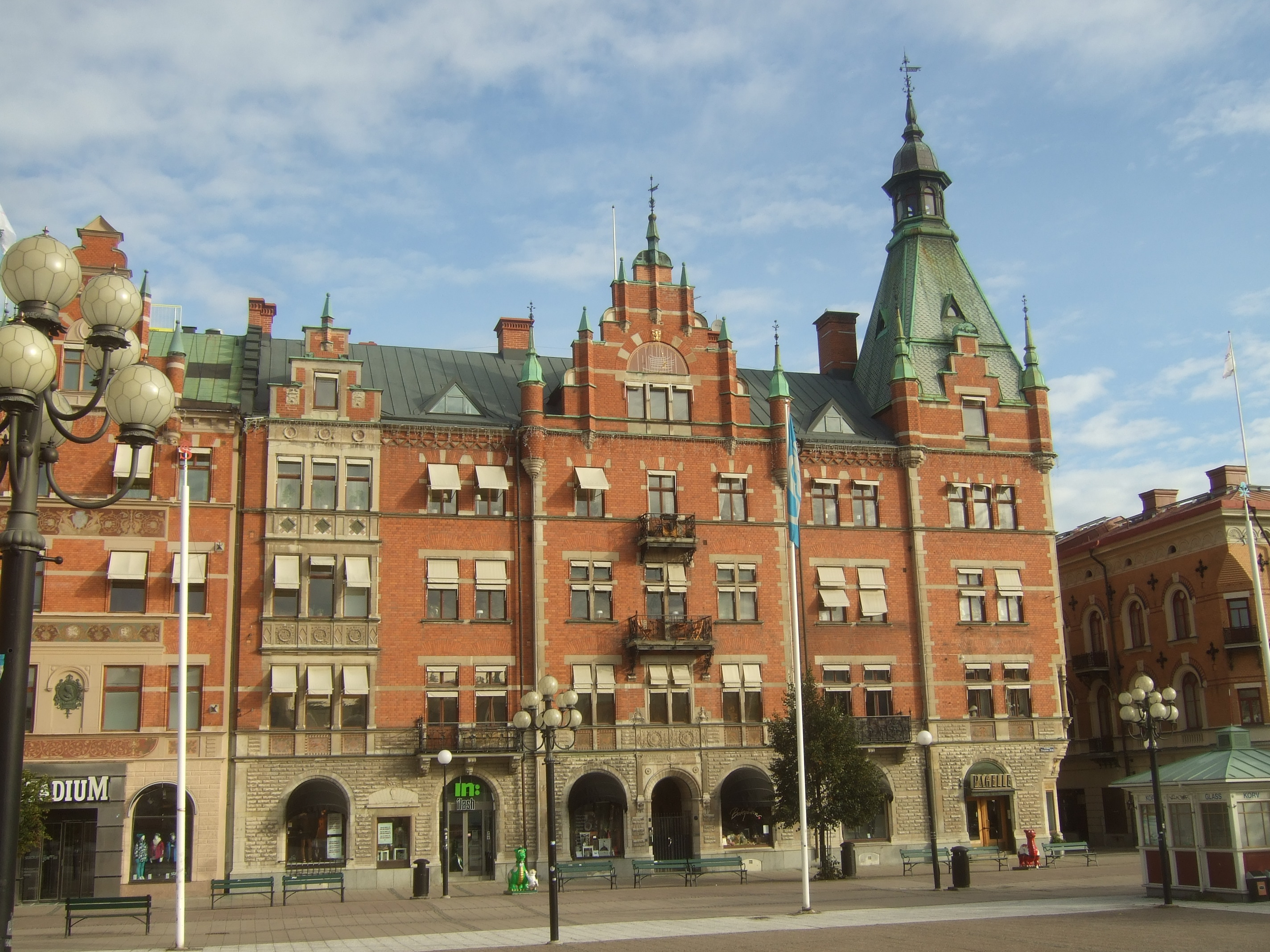
Grahnska huset

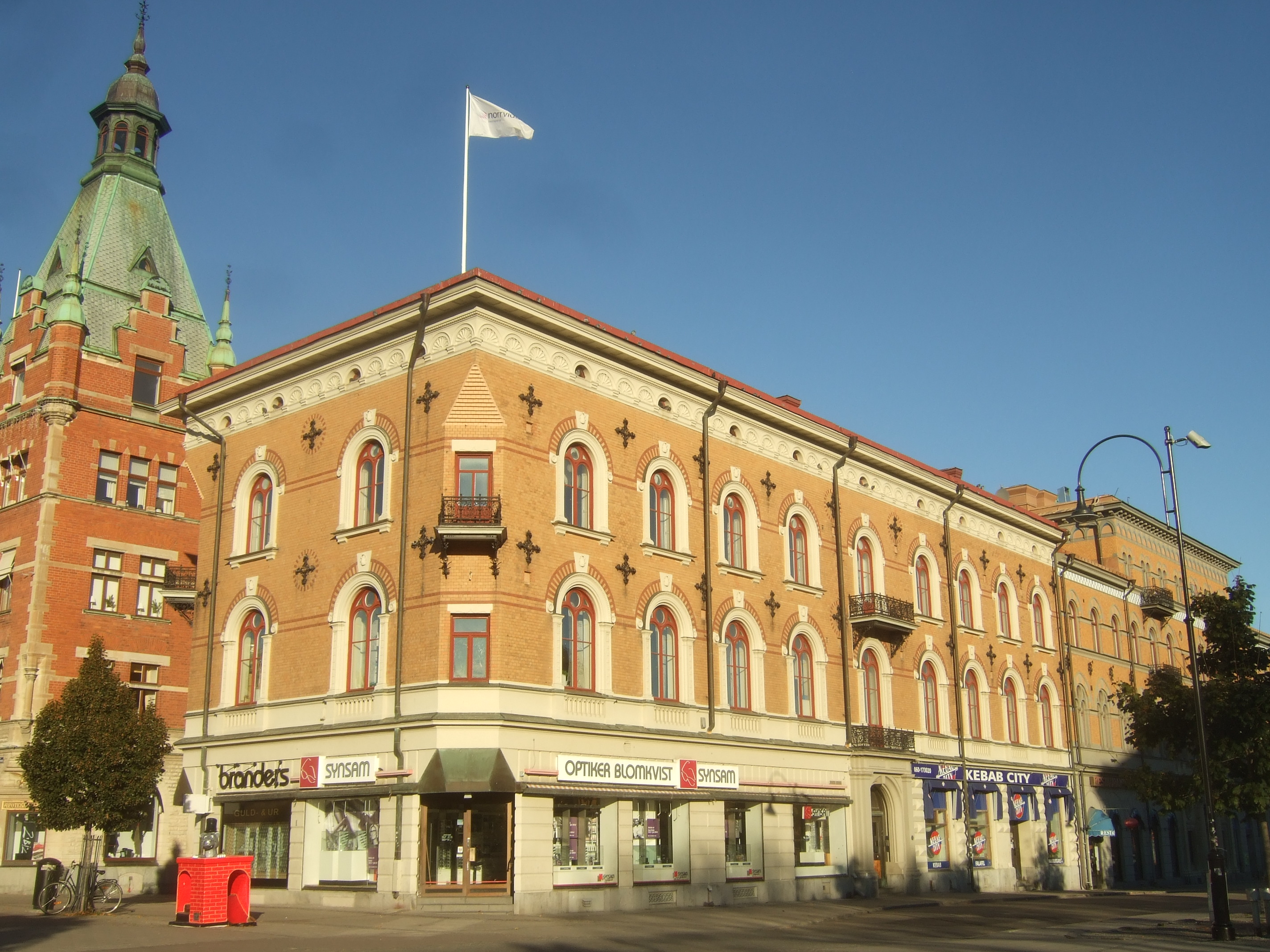
Rahmska huset

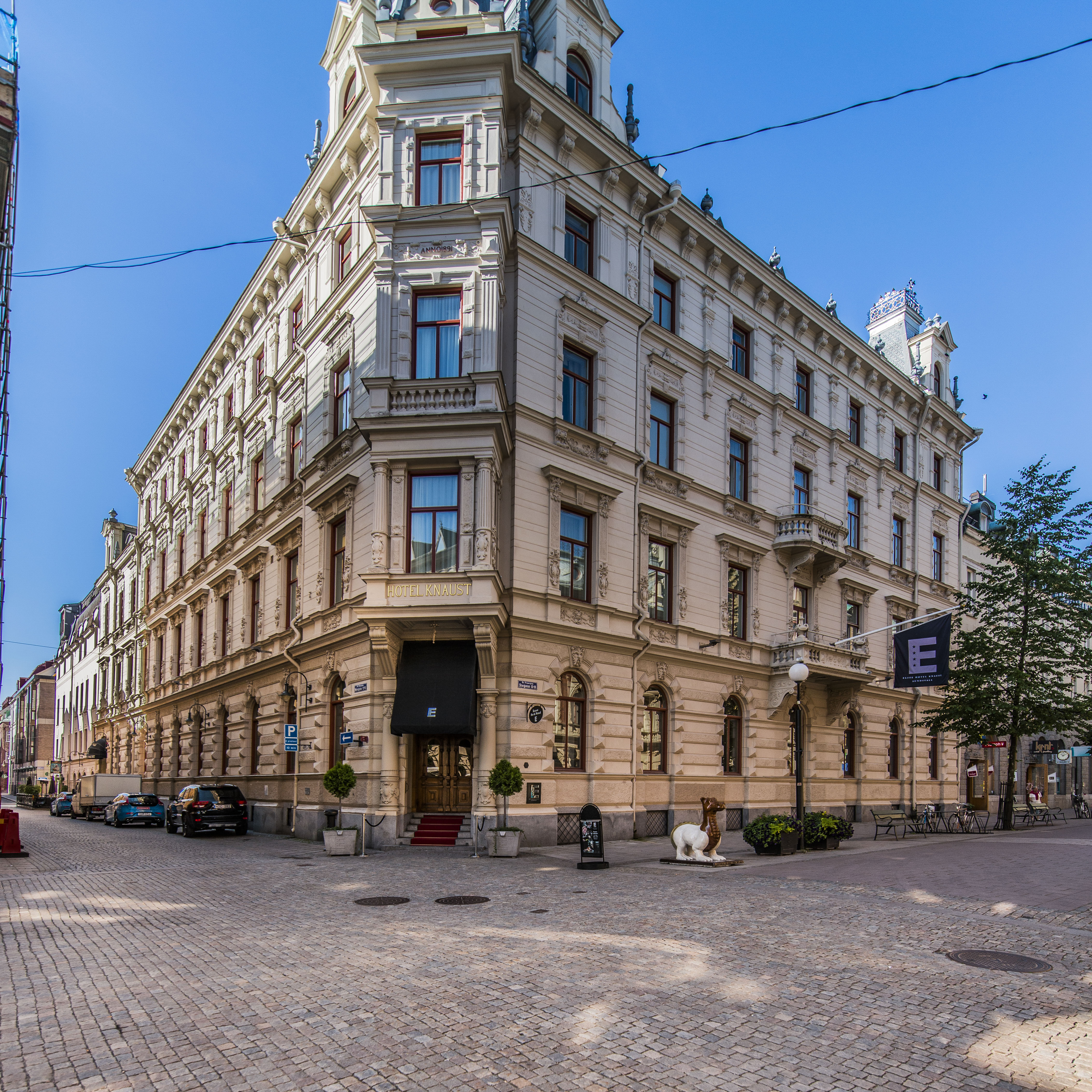
Hotel Knaust

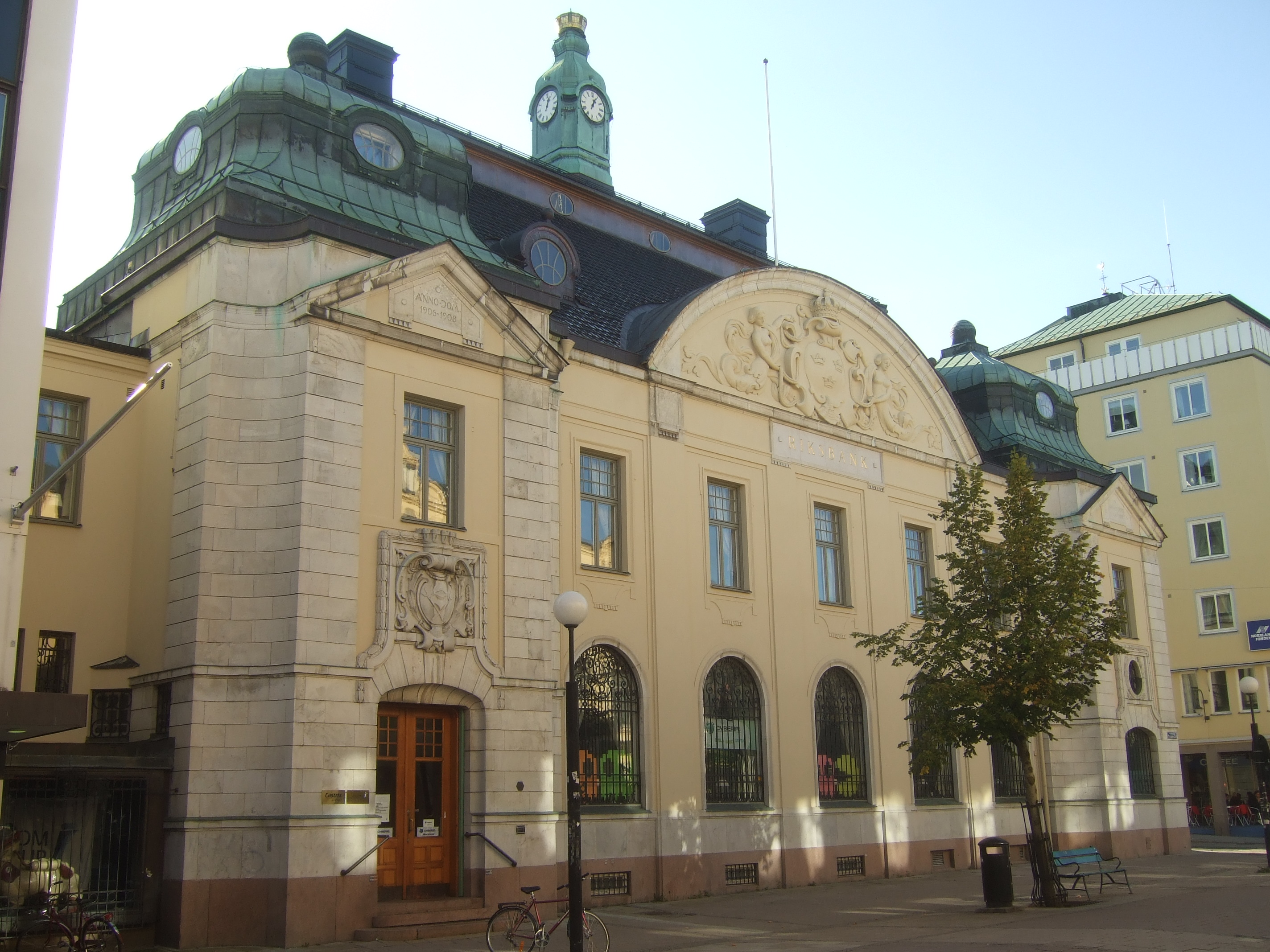
Gamla Riksbankshuset

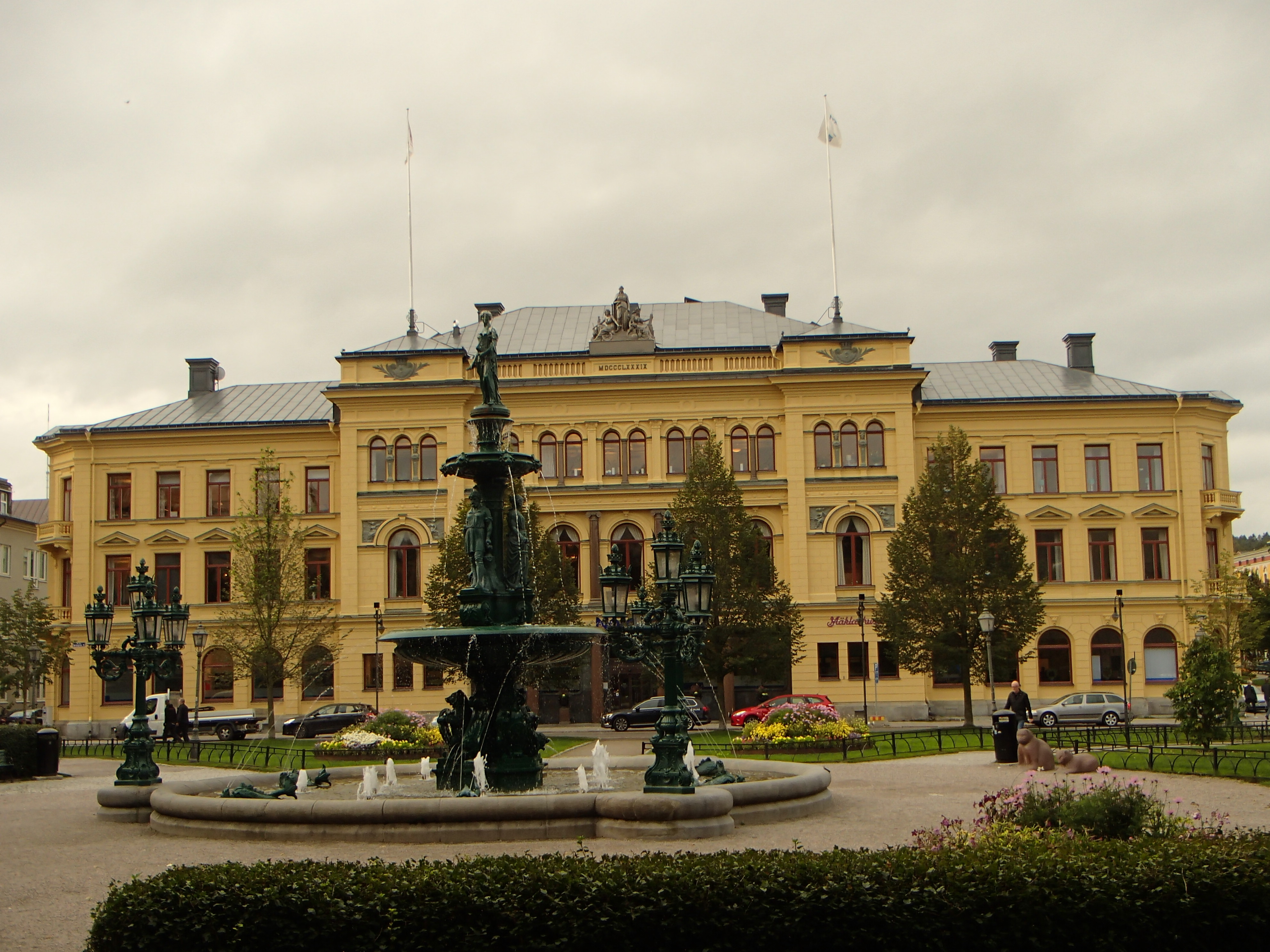
Sundsvallsbankens hus by Vängåvan

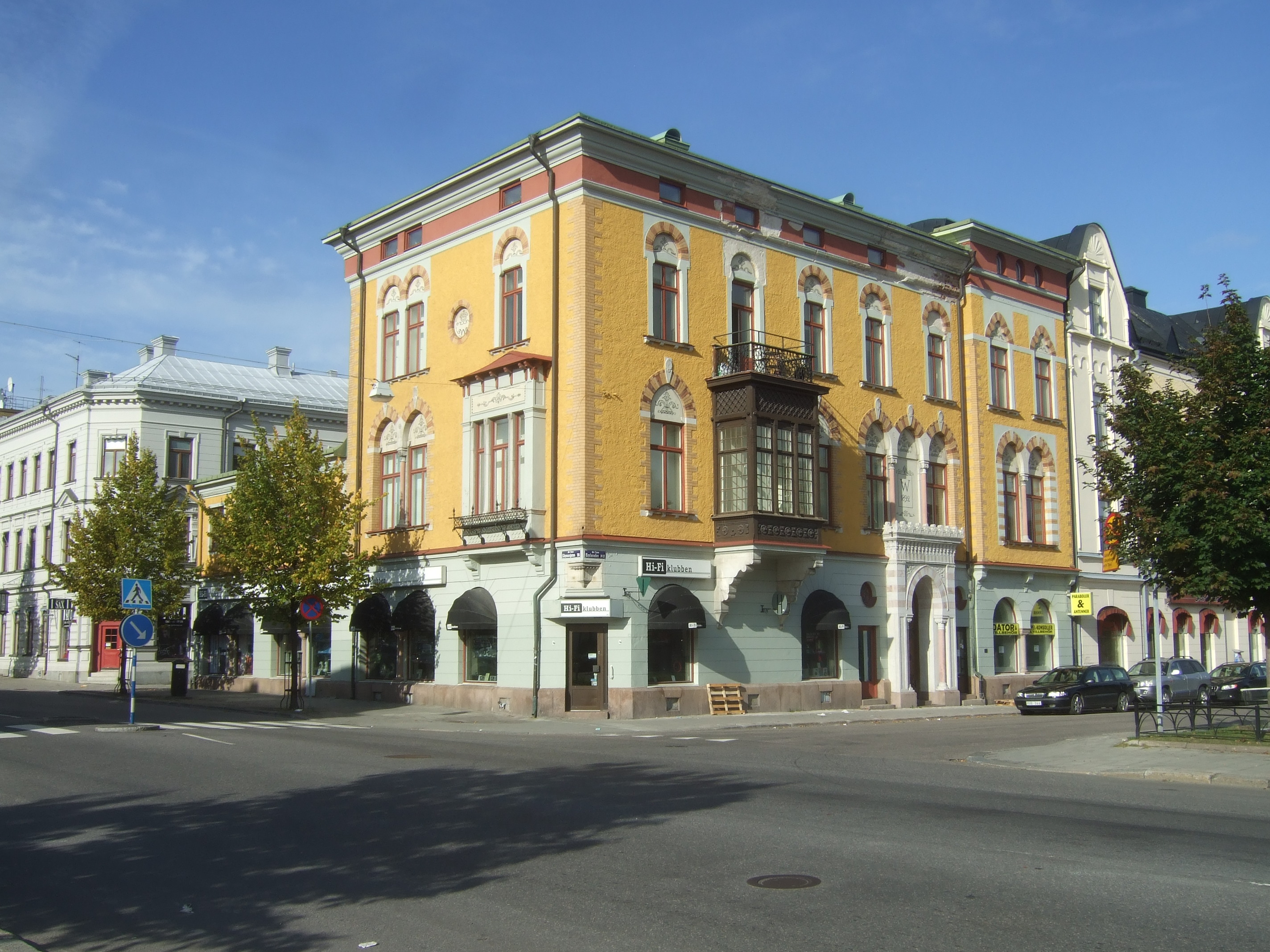
Wikströmska huset

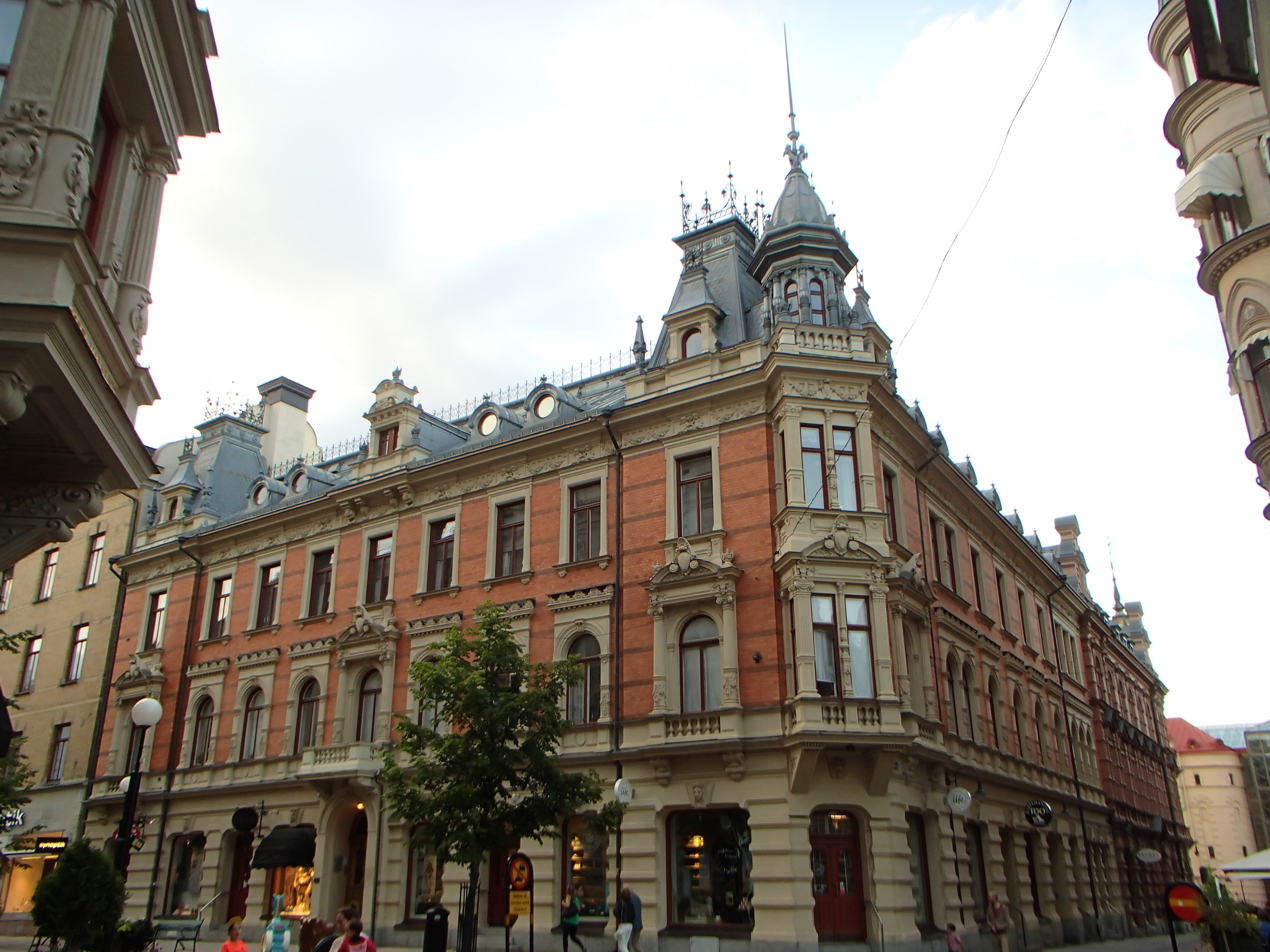
Blombergska huset

== Literature ==
- Boström, SvenÅke (2024). Sundsvall - utsikternas stad. ISBN 9789198884517.
