= Ursula Wirth =

Swedish automobile rally racer (1934–2019)

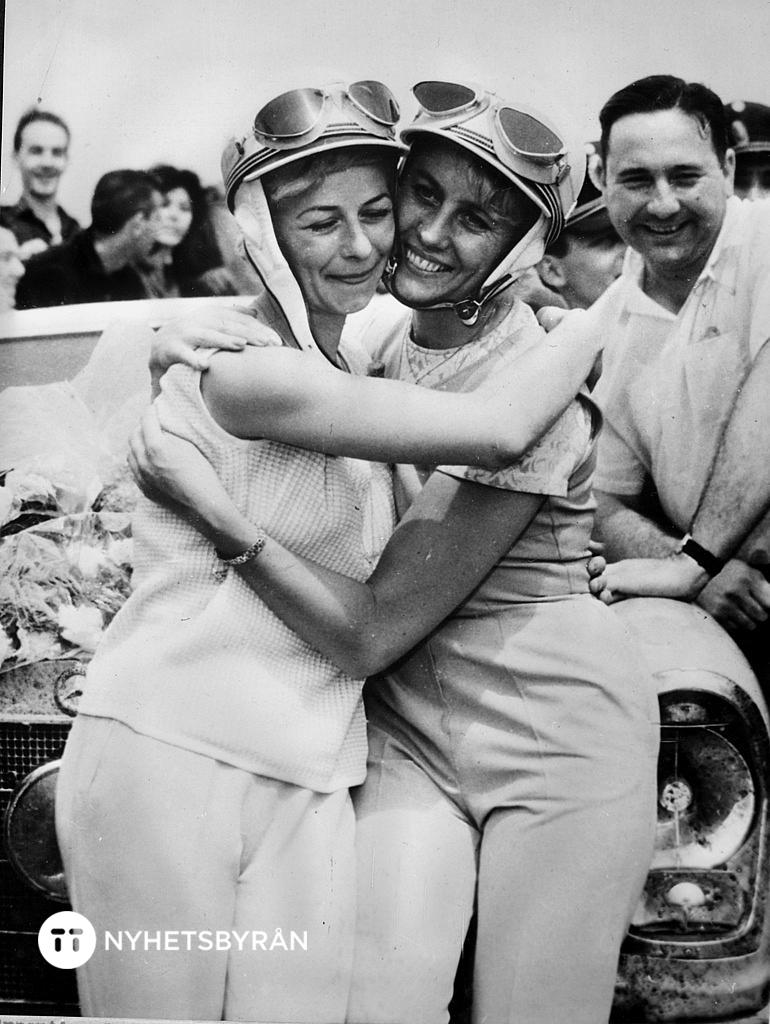
- Ursula Wirth (left) and Ewy Rosqvist-von Korff (right), in 1962.
- Born: April 25, 1934; Sundsvall
- Died: April 10, 2019 (aged 84); Stockholm
- Occupation: Automobile racer
- Known for: Won the Gran Premio Argentina with Ewy Rosqvist-von Korff in 1962

Ursula Wirth (April 25, 1934 – April 10, 2019) was a Swedish automobile rally racer. She and Ewy Rosqvist-von Korff won the Gran Premio Argentina in 1962, when they were also the first two-woman team to enter the race.

== Early life ==
Wirth was born in Sundsvall, the daughter of Kurt Artur August Max Wirth and Ruth Ingrid Tora Sjöbohm.

== Career ==
Wirth was a rural veterinary assistant as a young woman, driving from farm to farm to treat animals. Finding that she enjoyed driving, she became interested in rally racing. She placed well in a rally at Västergötland in 1960, and soon teamed up with another woman rally driver and veterinary assistant, Ewy Rosqvist-von Korff. Together, they won several international road rally competitions in the early 1960s, including the Gran Premio Argentina in 1962.

At the 1962 Argentina rally, Wirth and Rosqvist were not only the winning team, but the first two women to enter the six-stage, 2871-mile race; they won all six stages and set a speed record with their win. The two Swedish women were provided with bodyguards during their time in Argentina, for fear that they would be attacked by racing fans. Reports of their win were accompanied by headlines like "Pretty Dolls Whip Men in Grand Prix", and "Swedish Blondes Break Tradition in Grand Prix."

Wirth and Rosqvist won the Coupe des Dames at the 1963 Monte Carlo rally. Wirth worked with English driver Pat Moss in 1964, and left racing in 1965, but taught driving for almost thirty years in Stockholm. In 1969, she appeared in the film Monte Carlo or Bust!.

== Personal life ==
Wirth married television presenter Magnus Banck in 1965, and left rally racing. She was widowed when Banck died in 1981. She remarried in 1987, to Ingmar Fernström; he died in 2014. Ursula Wirth Fernström died in 2019, just before her 85th birthday, in Stockholm.
