= IBK Sundsvall =

Swedish floorball club

- Full name: Innebandyklubben Sundsvall
- Short name: IBKS
- Founded: 1986
- Dissolved: 2006

IBK Sundsvall was a floorball club in Sundsvall, Sweden, established in 1986. The men's team played in the Swedish top division during the 1990s. In 2006, the club merged with IBK Nordic becoming Sundsvall City.

In 1991 the club also played soccer in the men's Division 6.
