= Bengt Lindström =

Swedish artist (1925–2008)

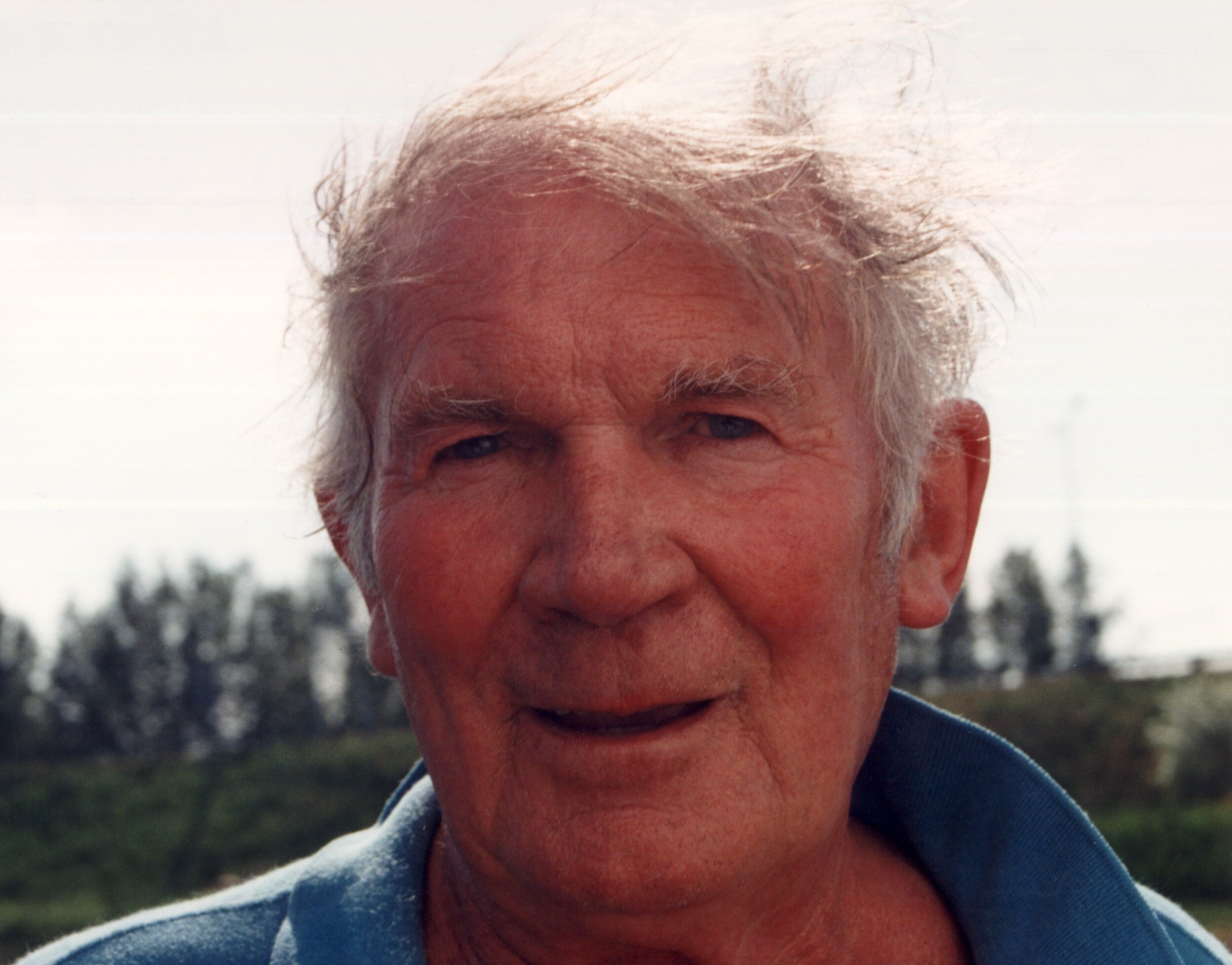
Lindström in June 1999

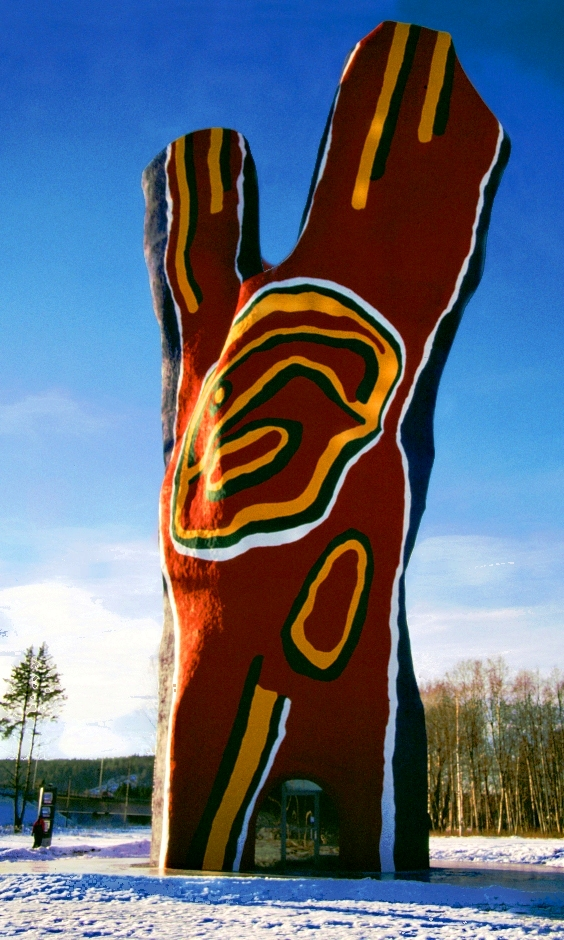
The Y sculpture, painted concrete, Sundsvall–Timrå Airport, Sweden, 1995

Bengt Karl Erik Lindström (September 3, 1925, Berg Municipality — January 29, 2008, Sundsvall) was a Swedish artist. Lindström was one of Sweden's best known contemporary artists with a characteristic style of distinct colors, often including contorted faces. He had two children, Mariana and Alexandre. In 2003, Lindström became disabled due to a stroke and he became unable to paint. The year 2004 saw the release of a film about Bengt's life: "Lindström - Le Diable de la Couleur et de la Forme" (Lindström – A Hell of a Feeling for Colour and Form). On 29 January 2008, Lindström died at his home in Sundsvall, Sweden.

== Education ==
Lindström was born in 1925 at Storsjö kapell, Härjedalen, Sweden. He was only three days old when Sámi King Kroik, his godfather, administered the "Baptism of the Earth", where the child is placed between two roots of a tree to grant him protection from the Gods. Bengt grew up in the vast landscape of Sápmi (sometimes referred to as Lapland), with mountain ranges, glistening lakes and endless forests. He went to school in Härnösand, where he started writing short science-fiction stories, became an athlete and started to draw and paint. The Sámi people, as well as local lumberjacks, would tell Bengt about the tales and legends of the Great White North. All this created the basis for the major influence of Sámi culture and traditions in Bengt's work.

In 1944, he moved to Stockholm to study under the Swedish painter Isaac Grünewald. He also participated in drawing lessons given by Aksel Jörgensen at the Copenhagen Fine Arts School in Denmark. In 1946, Bengt travelled to the United States to study at the Art Institute of Chicago and was inspired there by the work of De Kooning. In 1947, he moved to Paris, where he studied under the French painters André Lhote and Fernand Léger. Bengt was granted a scholarship by the Swedish magazine Aftontidningen, which helped him move into a workshop in Arcueil, France. In 1953, he returned to Paris, to a workshop in Rueil-Malmaison, where he continued the development of his unique style of painting. Soon after, he started collaborating with the Rive Gauche Gallery in Paris and Tooth & Sons Gallery in London. He developed his most known figurative art with masks, gods and monsters in France at Savigny-sur-Orge. As from 1968, he started dividing his time between his workshop in France and his atelier in Sundsvall, Sweden.

== Style and works ==
Lindström was influenced by and often based his work on the ethnic traditions of the Nordic world and Sámi culture. He was also influenced by the paintings of the COBRA group, active in the period Bengt studied in Copenhagen. COBRA was represented in Copenhagen by Asger Jorn and includes the famous artist Karel Appel, artists who were about 10 years older than Lindström. Unlike the COBRA group, Lindström used his paint by the bucket, with heavy applications of mostly primary and secondary saturated colours, using his fingers as well as big brushes.

"[...] I work with extremely pure and intense colours. When I juxtapose them, it often gives the impression of 'having no soul', isn't that so? something too decorative. Thus red against green, against blue may create harmonies which must not become too beautiful or too pleasant. No, something more must be added to the work, it must have a soul, yes, a soul you can feel, in order to be moved."

His work became internationally well respected because of its powerful presentation of human themes, depicted in vivid colours. Lindström is probably best known for his large works, such as oil and acrylic works, mural paintings and colourful sculptures, but he used a great variety of media, including glass, dry point, tapestries, graffiti art, lithography and engraving. His most famous sculpture is probably the massive Y-sculpture at Midlanda Airport north of Sundsvall, Sweden.

=== Paintings ===
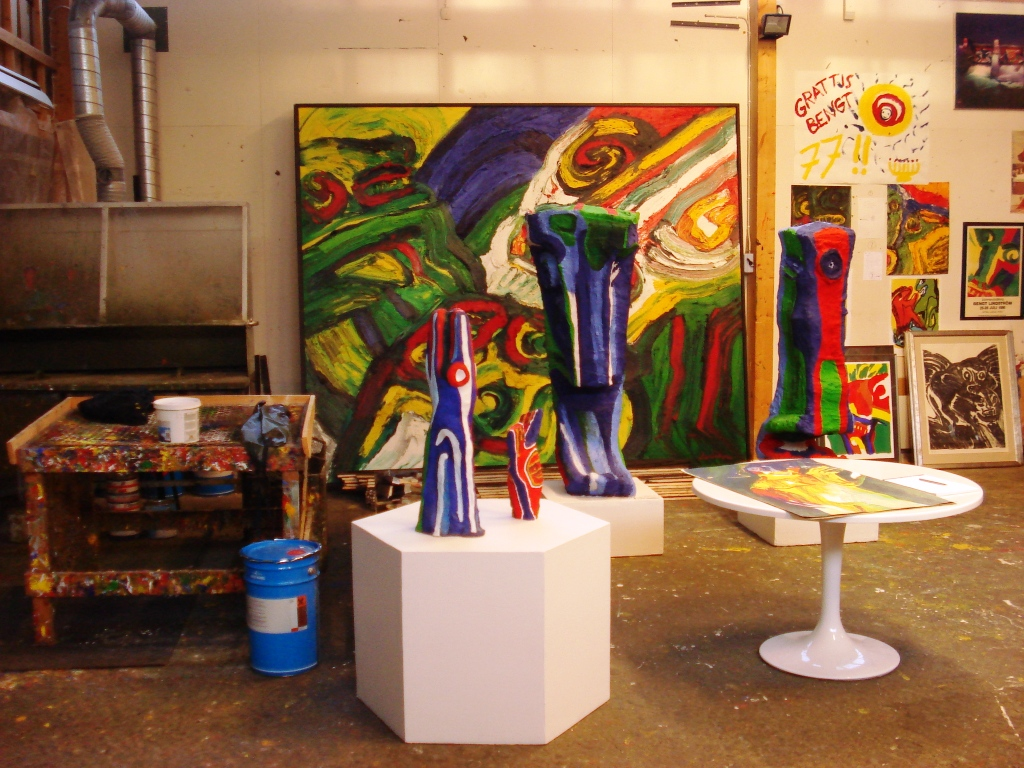
Bengt Lindstrom Swedish Atelier impression

Lindström exhibited seven monumental 3 x 2.5 meter art works at the Art and History Museum in Stockholm, "The Great Aesir Gods", depicting the gods from Scandinavian mythology: Thor, Odin, Freyja, Baldr, Ymir, Loki and Unknown God, as well as acrylic paintings about the Valkyries. He also has a series of 2 x 2 meter art works called "The Great Prophets" and a series of large blue acrylic paintings called "Women".

"I think I paint from curiosity, to find mystery and light which amaze me and which may also surprise others."

=== Lithography and engraving ===
Lithography and engraving became vital parts of his portfolio. In the sixties, Lindström completed a series of 10 lithographs about Scandinavian mythology. He published a boxed set album, called "Eddan, Eddan, Eddan", illustrating Scandinavian mythology.

While working in an atelier in the Alicante region, he completed "Novelda", an album of lithographs featuring poems by Spanish poet Paco Pastor. One of his works, "Winter" made the cover of the first 1996 issue of Telerama, a French weekly magazine.

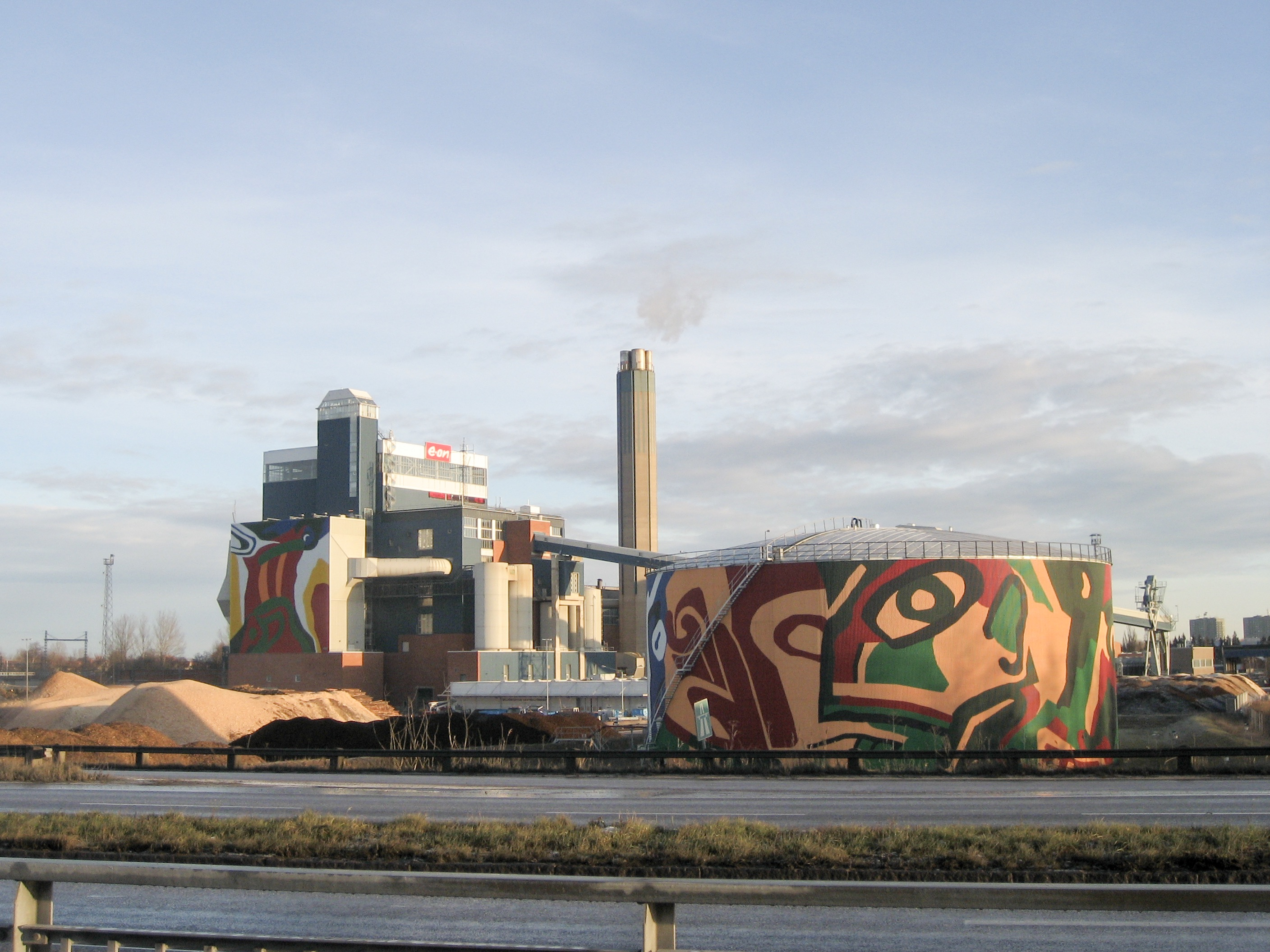
Mural painting by Bengt Lindström at the Åbyverket in Örebro, Sweden.

=== Murals and graffiti ===
Lindström completed several larger works: a mural painting at the Grand Hotel in Härnösand, Sweden, as well as two big frescoes for the Nacksta-Sundsvall covered market in Sweden.

In association with Sydkraft and the municipality of Örebro, he painted a fresco on a 17 meters high tank with a surface area of 3,000 m^{2} located at the crossroads of major Swedish motorways.

His creations also include a mural of 5 x 5 meter for the Västeras Science Institute in Sweden and a 30 meter high fresco for the town of Örebro.

Bengt completed a 4 x 10 meter mural in the lobby of the University of Eskilstuna, Sweden, two monumental frescoes on the Akkats dam and a mural on the power station facing Jokkmokk in Swedish Sápmi.

=== Sculptures ===
Bengt completed "Thor's Hammer", a monumental, colorful sculpture in Odenskog. The car painted for Volvo in 1980 has become an integral part of the hammer in the giant god Thor's hand.

He also made two editions of bronze sculptures called "The Wild Children". Towards the end of his career, he completed a couple of 2 meter high painted polyester sculptures, "Him and Her".

In Ånge, Lindström created a 6.5 meter high "Tången" sculpture, made of painted concrete, which was inaugurated in the presence of the King and Queen of Sweden.

In the 1990s, the "Y", a monumental sculpture near Midlanda airport in Sweden, got inaugurated. The 6 meter high sculpture "The Wolf", made for PEAB, was inaugurated in Botkyrka.

=== Other art media and performance arts ===
"Men of the North" became the first of several major tapestries by his hand, "Presence", a 3.5 x 2.7 meter tapestry for the municipality of Timrå, Sweden is another. He created "Kåtan Mimi", an 8 x 9 meter Sámi tent, for the town of Arjeplog in Swedish Sápmi.

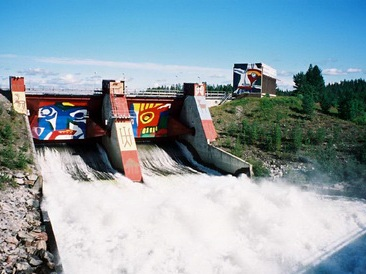
Bengt Lindström mural on Akkat's dam, Sweden

At the end of the seventies, he started with glass sculpturing, making thirty dishes and goblets for renowned Swedish glassmaker Kosta Boda. In Murano, he designed the "Large Glasses" series of large crystal vases and sculptures. Bengt began working on ceramics in Albisolla, Italy and he completed a new series of crystal sculptures with Adriano Bérengo also in Italy.

On the occasion of a retrospective exhibition at Sundsvall museum, Bengt painted a monumental 700 square meter canvas: "The Giant on the Mountain", which remained on the mountain slope facing the town all summer long.

Close to his birthplace, Bengt painted gigantic tarpaulins over forty metres high, covering the slopes of the neighbouring Våladalen Mountain, as a protest against the construction of a dam. This action caused a sensation and provoked fierce reactions.

Lindström also painted several Volvo model cars and all sides of a lorry for Scania, Sweden's main truck manufacturer.

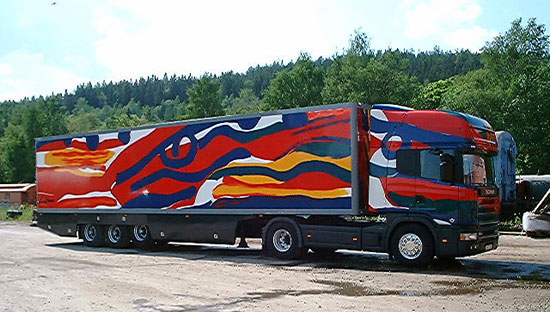
Bengt Lindström graffiti art, the truck, Scania, Sweden

Bengt designed two limited edition watches for Swatch, one called "Temps Zero" in 1995 and "Skritek" in the year 2000.

=== Expositions ===
Throughout his life exhibitions were held in Europe and the United States, earning him a solid reputation among the public and his peers. Bengt Lindström's work is exhibited in museums all over the world.

1952 : Foire Réalités Nouvelles, Paris, France. 1954 Foire Salon d'Octobre, Paris, France. 1959 New Europe, United States, Switzerland 1961 Salon de Mai, Paris, France. Musée des Beaux-Arts de Ghent, Belgium. 1966 Museum of Modern Art, Gothenburg, Sweden. 1967 Carnegie Institute, Pittsburgh, United States. 1973 Musée Galliera, Paris, France. 1983 Historiska Museet, Stockholm, Sweden. 1984 Musée Château Comtal, Carcassonne, France. 1986 Museum of Salamanca, Spain. 1990 Centre Culturel de Brest, France. 1992 Musée de Vesoul, Vesoul, France. 1993 Museum de Cognac, Cognac, France. Vasarely Museum, Gordes, France. Pinacothèque de Ravenne, Ravenne, Italy. 1995/2005/2006 Museum of Sundsvall, Sweden. 1996/2007 Museum of Härnosänd, Sweden. Museum of Jokkmok, Sweden. Museum of Örebro Castle, Sweden. 1997 Musée de la Ville, Angers, France. Centre of contemporary art of Midlanda, Sweden 1998 Musée de l'Ardenne, Charleville-Mézières, France. 1999 Centre culturel suédois, Paris, France. 2001 Hamburg International Fair, Germany. 2008 Grönsöö Castle, Enköping, Sweden.

The inauguration of the Midlanda Contemporary Arts Center in Sweden took place in 1996. This Center maintained the collection of the Bengt and Michèle Lindström Foundation, featuring the entire engravings collection (approximately 800 works) as well as a selection of paintings and sculptures. The collection was later donated and transferred to the Länsmuseet i Västernorrland in Härnösand, Sweden, where a special room was prepared to host "The Great Aesir Gods".
