= Ewy Rosqvist-von Korff =

Swedish rally driver (1929–2024)

Ewy Rosqvist
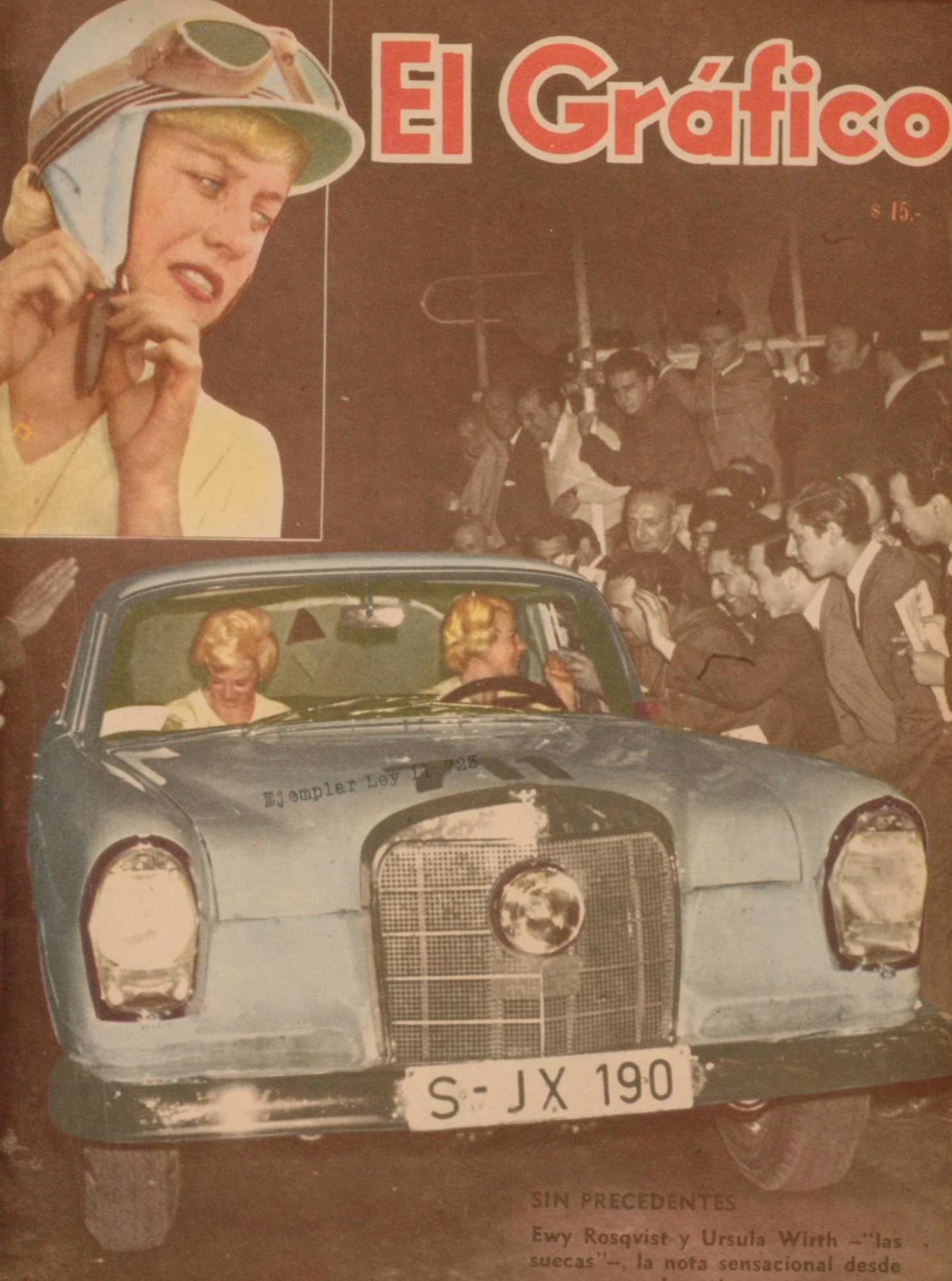
- Ewy Rosqvist and Ursula Wirth on the cover of the Argentine sports magazine El Gráfico, 31 October 1962.
- Nationality: Swedish
- Born: Ewy Jönsson; 3 August 1929 Ystad, Sweden
- Died: 4 July 2024 (aged 94) Stockholm, Sweden
- Years active: 195?–1967
- Teams: Mercedes-Benz factory team during her rally career
- Wins: Won and set a new average speed record in the Gran Premio Argentina 1962 (as the first female driver)

Ewy Rosqvist (née Jönsson, later Baroness Ewy von Korff, also written Ewy von Korff-Rosqvist; 3 August 1929 – 4 July 2024) was one of the most successful ever Swedish rally drivers. She won several European championships, as well as the ladies' classification in Rally to the Midnight Sun (four times, now called Rally Sweden). Her most notable accomplishment was the overall win in the Argentine Turismo Standard Grand Prix) in 1962, with Ursula Wirth (1934–2019) as her co-driver.

== Biography ==
=== Early years ===
Ewy Jönsson was born on 3 August 1929, in Stora Herrestads socken outside Ystad, as the only daughter in a farming family of five children. After attending an agricultural school, she became a veterinary assistant.

In her work as a veterinary assistant, Jönsson had to drive a car, regularly visiting 7-8 farms each day. It was then her interest in (fast) driving was born, and after a while, she started recording lap times between the different farms.

Both Ewy (now with the surname Rosqvist after her marriage to Yngve Rosqvist) and her husband became members of Royal Automobile Club, in the beginning with her husband Yngve Rosqvist doing most of the driving, with his wife as a co-driver. After the Automobile Club expressed their interest in her, Ewy Rosqvist started competing as a driver as well.

=== Rallying career ===
Ewy Rosqvist was quick to become a competitive racer, and after a while, she was one of Europe's best female drivers. In 1960, she signed as a factory driver for Volvo. Two years later, Mercedes-Benz bought out her contract, starting her international career in earnest. During her most intense years of competition, she could have as much as 280 travel days away from home.

She won the European Championship in 1959, 1960 and 1961, the latter shared with Pat Moss. She won the ladies' classification in Midnattssolsrallyt ("Rally to the Midnight Sun", now called Rally Sweden) from 1959 to 1962.

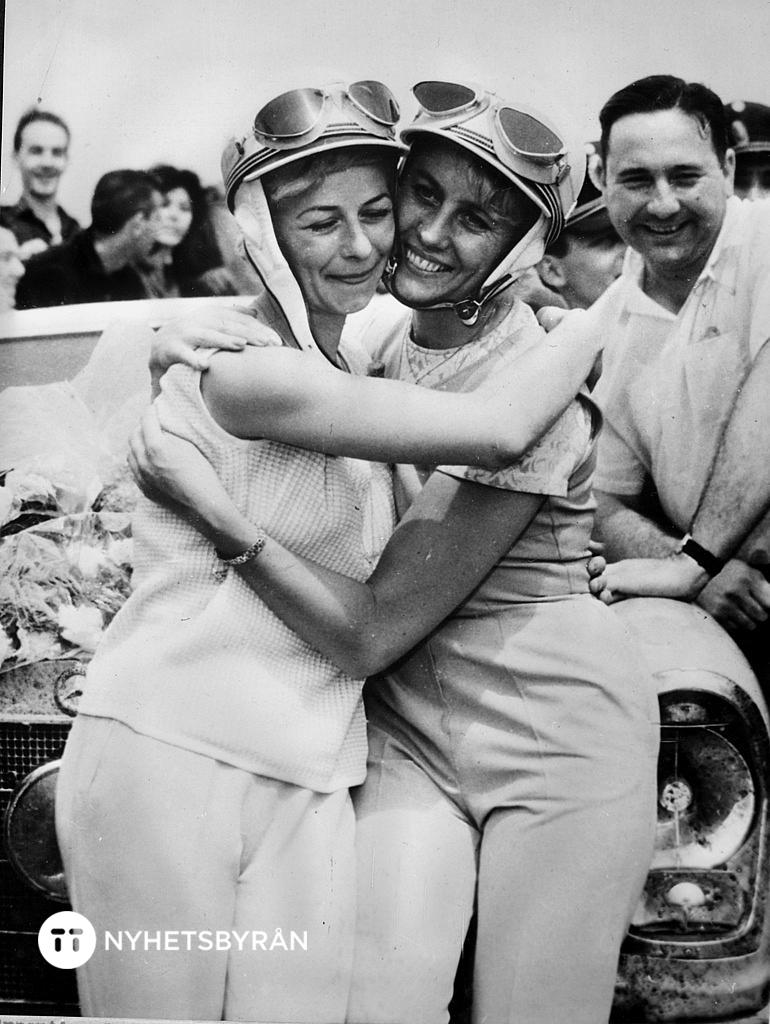
Ursula Wirth (left) and Ewy Rosqvist (right) after winning the Argentine Turismo Standard Grand Prix in 1962

In 1962, Ewy Rosqvist successfully participated in the Argentine Turismo Standard Grand Prix (as the first female), she drove a large (2 ton) Mercedes-Benz 220 SE with Ursula Wirth co-driving. The duo won all six stages and also set a new speed record for the race. In 1961 the average speed of the winner was 121 km/h, Rosqvist's average in 1962 was almost 127 km/h.

In the following years, Rosqvist placed second and third (in 1963 and 1964 respectively) in the Argentine GP, as well as victories in the 2.5-litre class in both the Monte Carlo Rally and on the Nürburgring. She also participated successfully in the Acropolis and Spa-Sofia-Liège rallies.

=== Later years ===
Rosqvist stopped participating in large races after Mercedes-Benz disbanded their factory rally team in 1965. By then, new manufacturers with lighter cars had made the relatively heavy Mercedes much less competitive. Ewy Rosqvist got an offer to drive for Audi, but instead chose to end her career in top-tier rallying. In June 1964, she married Alexander von Korff, head of the Mercedes-Benz motorsport division.

Ewy Rosqvist stopped competing in 1967, after a career completely without accidents, crashes or broken cars. Her trophies and race car are displayed at the Mercedes-Benz Museum in Stuttgart. She worked for many years at the museum as a guide and was a test driver for new Mercedes models.

Rosqvist remained for several years in Stuttgart after Alexander von Korff died in 1977, but eventually moved back to Sweden. There she met Karl Gustav Svedberg, head of the company Philipson Bil AB, an importer and dealer of Mercedes-Benz automobiles. They lived together until his death in 2009.

Rosqvist died on 4 July 2024, at the age of 94.

== Awards ==
Årets idrottskvinna (female athlete of the year) 1961, awarded by the Stockholms-Tidningen newspaper.
