= Sundsvall =

- Sundsvall och Timrå
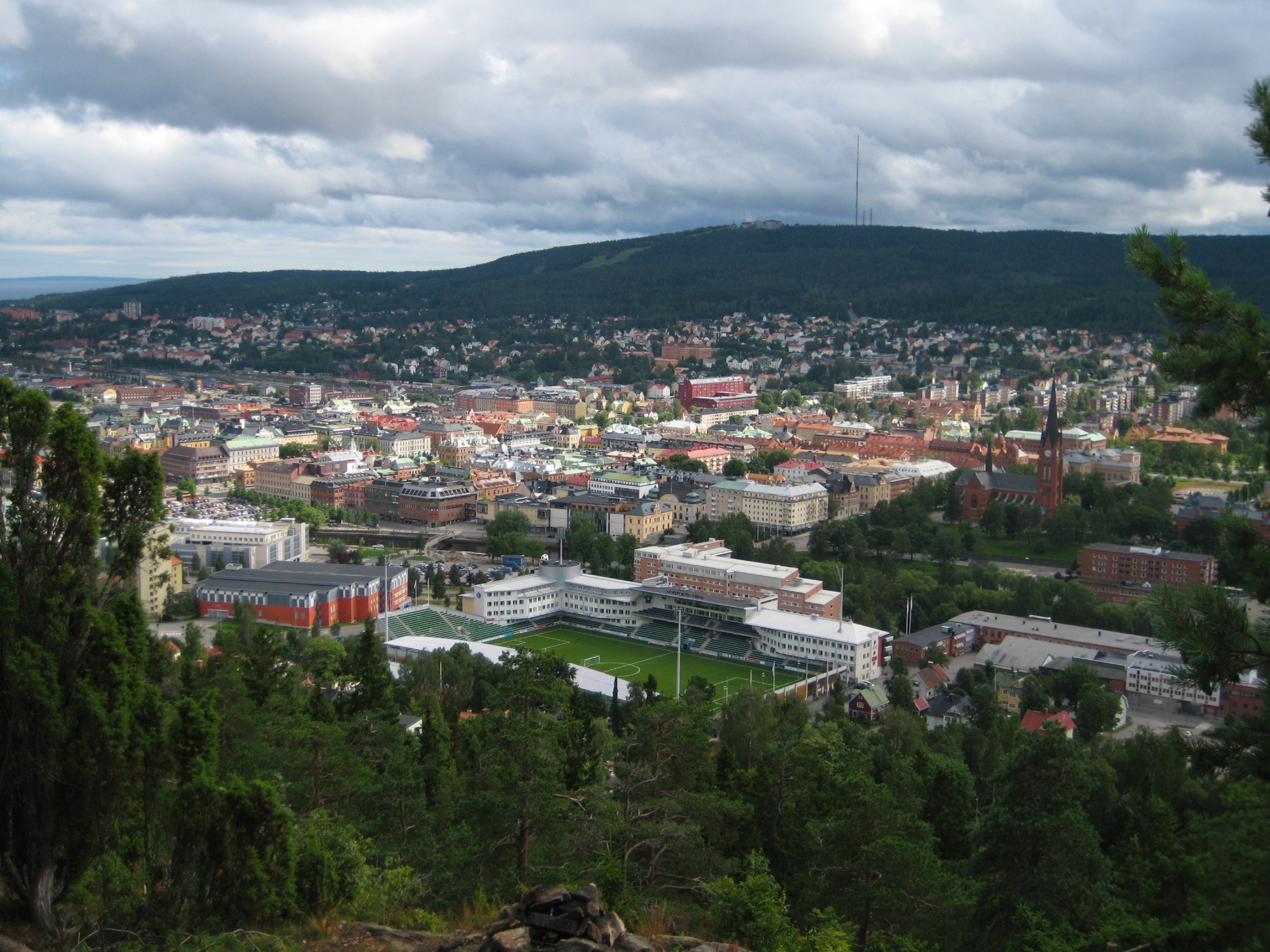
- Panorama view of downtown Sundsvall, 2010

- Location within Västernorrland Location within Sweden
- Coordinates: 62°24′N 17°19′E
- Country: Sweden
- Province: Medelpad
- County: Västernorrland County
- Municipality: Sundsvall Municipality

Area
  - City: 53.28 km^{2} (20.57 sq mi)

Population (2023)
  - City: 70,918
  - Density: 1,331/km^{2} (3,450/sq mi)
  - Urban: 99,825
- Time zone: UTC+1 (CET)
  - Summer (DST): UTC+2 (CEST)

Sundsvall (Swedish: [ˈsɵ̂nː(d)sval]), or Sundsvall och Timrå (Note: The city officially changed its name to "Sundsvall och Timrå" following a merging of the two cities formerly known as Sundsvall and Timrå.) is a city and the seat of Sundsvall Municipality in Västernorrland County, Sweden. As of 2023, the city has a population of 70,918; nearly 100,000 live in the municipal area. It is Sweden's 17th largest city by population. The city is widely known for its stone buildings in the city centre, known as "Stenstaden".

== History ==
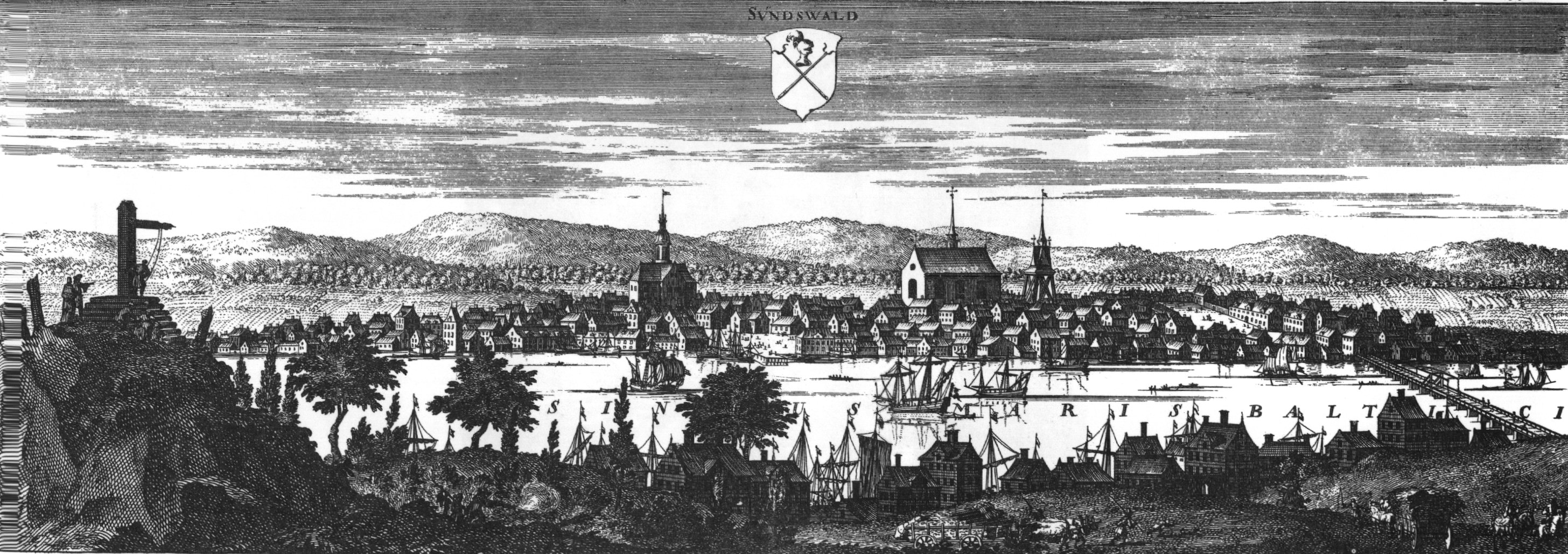
Sundsvall c. 1700, in Suecia antiqua et hodierna

The town was chartered in 1621, and a first urban plan for Sundsvall was probably created by Olof Bure in 1642, less likely in 1623. It has a port by the Gulf of Bothnia, and is located 395 km north of Stockholm. The city has burned down and been rebuilt four times. The first time, in 1721, it was set on fire by the Russian army during the Russian Pillage of 1719-1721.

According to one historian, Swedish industrialism started in Sundsvall when the Tunadal sawmill bought a steam-engine driven saw in 1849. In the early 20th century Sundsvall was an even greater centre of forestry industry in Sweden than it is today. The first large Swedish strike was the "Sundsvall strike" in 1879. The industrial heritage makes social democrat and socialist sympathies more prevalent in the Sundsvall region than in Sweden as a whole.

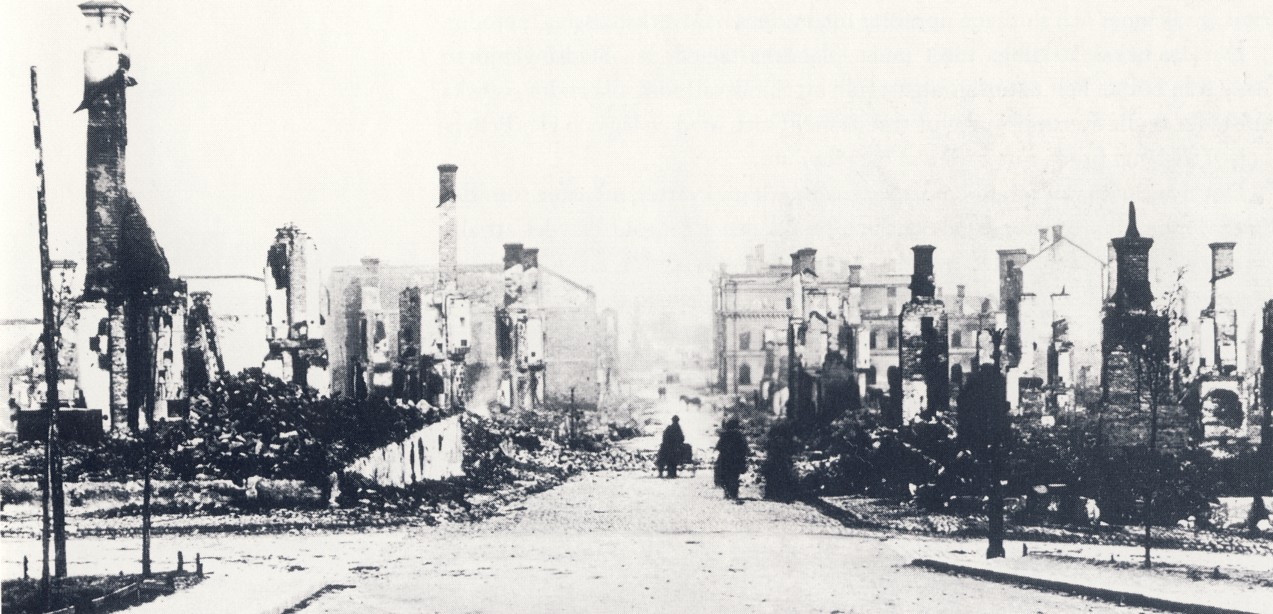
The city was burnt on 25 June 1888.

In 1888 on 25 June, strong wind and dry conditions contributed to two city fires in Sweden on the same day. On this day both Umeå and Sundsvall caught fire. The Sundsvall fire was the largest in Sweden's history. It is presumed that the fire was caused by a spark from a steamship. After the fire, and unlike Umeå, the decision was to rebuild using stone. Sundsvall's centre was later nicknamed Stenstaden (the stone city). One advantage of the new construction was that within three years the town was arguing that it should be allowed reduced insurance as new rules had been brought in that applied to wooden towns. One disadvantage was that after the fire only the better off could afford to live in the centre.

Today Sundsvall is not only dominated by the pulp and paper industry and the aluminium production, but there are also banks, insurance companies, telecommunications administration and a number of large public data-processing centres such as the national social insurance board. One of the two campuses of Mid Sweden University (Mittuniversitetet) is located in the city (The other campus is in Östersund).

== Climate ==
Sundsvall has a climate which is on the border between subarctic (Dfc) and cold humid continental (Dfb), leaning towards the latter in recent years. Temperatures are made significantly milder and regulated by the influence from the Gulf Stream. The weather station is located 20 kilometres (12 mi) to the north and somewhat further inland near Timrå, which has lower minimum temperatures than Sundsvall's urban centre.

Climate data for Sundsvall Airport (2002–2021); extremes since 1943; sunshine 1961–1990
| Month | Jan | Feb | Mar | Apr | May | Jun | Jul | Aug | Sep | Oct | Nov | Dec | Year |
|---|---|---|---|---|---|---|---|---|---|---|---|---|---|
| Record high °C (°F) | 11.0 (51.8) | 13.8 (56.8) | 15.2 (59.4) | 21.9 (71.4) | 27.4 (81.3) | 35.0 (95.0) | 33.0 (91.4) | 31.3 (88.3) | 27.2 (81.0) | 21.5 (70.7) | 14.0 (57.2) | 10.5 (50.9) | 35.0 (95.0) |
| Mean maximum °C (°F) | 5.3 (41.5) | 6.8 (44.2) | 11.5 (52.7) | 16.8 (62.2) | 22.2 (72.0) | 25.7 (78.3) | 27.8 (82.0) | 26.0 (78.8) | 21.1 (70.0) | 14.5 (58.1) | 8.8 (47.8) | 6.7 (44.1) | 28.8 (83.8) |
| Mean daily maximum °C (°F) | −2.5 (27.5) | −1.2 (29.8) | 3.3 (37.9) | 8.6 (47.5) | 14.0 (57.2) | 18.8 (65.8) | 21.7 (71.1) | 20.0 (68.0) | 15.3 (59.5) | 8.3 (46.9) | 2.6 (36.7) | −0.6 (30.9) | 9.0 (48.2) |
| Daily mean °C (°F) | −6.5 (20.3) | −5.6 (21.9) | −1.4 (29.5) | 3.5 (38.3) | 8.6 (47.5) | 13.5 (56.3) | 16.7 (62.1) | 15.6 (60.1) | 10.8 (51.4) | 4.6 (40.3) | −0.4 (31.3) | −4.1 (24.6) | 4.6 (40.3) |
| Mean daily minimum °C (°F) | −10.4 (13.3) | −10.0 (14.0) | −6.1 (21.0) | −1.7 (28.9) | 3.2 (37.8) | 8.2 (46.8) | 11.7 (53.1) | 10.6 (51.1) | 6.2 (43.2) | 0.8 (33.4) | −3.4 (25.9) | −7.6 (18.3) | 0.1 (32.2) |
| Mean minimum °C (°F) | −22.5 (−8.5) | −21.5 (−6.7) | −17.4 (0.7) | −7.4 (18.7) | −3.0 (26.6) | 2.3 (36.1) | 6.1 (43.0) | 4.5 (40.1) | −0.1 (31.8) | −6.4 (20.5) | −11.5 (11.3) | −16.8 (1.8) | −24.9 (−12.8) |
| Record low °C (°F) | −35.5 (−31.9) | −34.8 (−30.6) | −34.2 (−29.6) | −20.0 (−4.0) | −8.2 (17.2) | −2.0 (28.4) | 1.9 (35.4) | −0.6 (30.9) | −7.7 (18.1) | −15.2 (4.6) | −22.1 (−7.8) | −36.6 (−33.9) | −36.6 (−33.9) |
| Average precipitation mm (inches) | 56.1 (2.21) | 31.7 (1.25) | 30.5 (1.20) | 27.6 (1.09) | 43.3 (1.70) | 46.9 (1.85) | 58.8 (2.31) | 72.5 (2.85) | 59.6 (2.35) | 63.6 (2.50) | 51.0 (2.01) | 59.1 (2.33) | 600.7 (23.65) |
| Average extreme snow depth cm (inches) | 38 (15) | 45 (18) | 43 (17) | 23 (9.1) | 0 (0) | 0 (0) | 0 (0) | 0 (0) | 0 (0) | 0 (0) | 9 (3.5) | 22 (8.7) | 52 (20) |
| Mean monthly sunshine hours | 43 | 81 | 135 | 185 | 259 | 287 | 267 | 215 | 142 | 98 | 57 | 34 | 1,803 |
Source 1: SMHI Open Data for Sundsvall-Timrå flygplats, temperature
Source 2: SMHI Open Data for Stordala-Midlanda D, precipitation

== Culture ==
=== Music ===
There is a professional orchestra named Nordiska Kammarorkestern (Nordic Chamber Ochestra), formed in 1990, which primarily plays modern pieces. Sundsvall is known for its tradition of choirs, and most notably those founded by Kjell Lönnå.

Other musicians from Sundsvall are Helen Sjöholm, Anna Stadling, Yohio, Gina Dirawi and the bands The Confusions, Garmarna, Supersci and Oh My!.

There is a small guitar festival and a larger heavy metal festival every autumn called Nordfest. Sundsvall is also home to the unique festival Musikschlaget, which is a song contest for groups around Sweden with disabilities. Sundsvall hosted the final heat and second chance round 'finalkval' of Melodifestivalen 2026.

=== Art ===
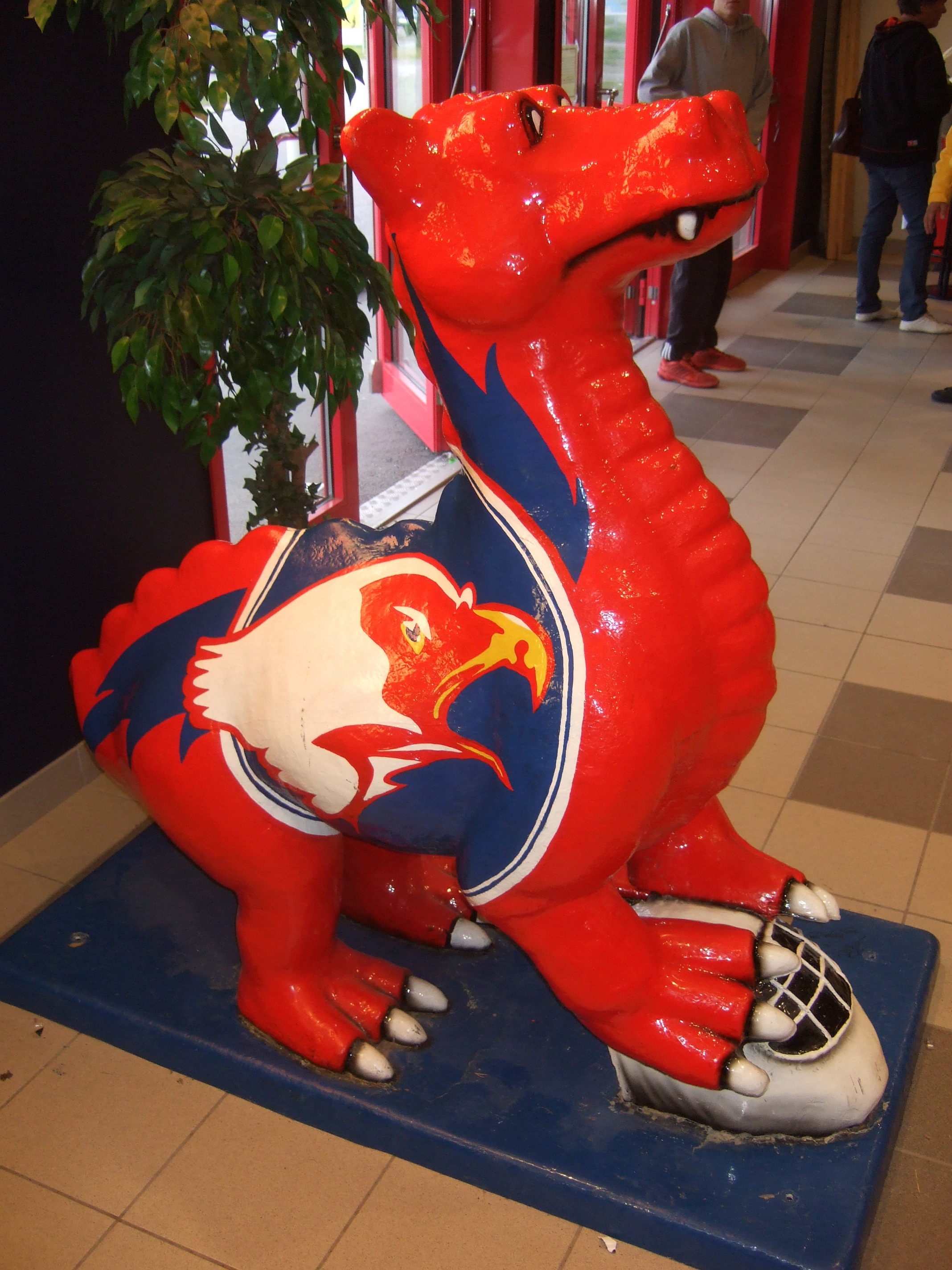
A dragon sponsored by Timrå IK

The painter Bengt Lindström (1925-2008) had his studio in Essvik, south of the city.

Sundsvall's unofficial symbol is the dragon, and since 2003, lots of gentle-looking dragons can be seen in the city streets. Another fantasy animal associated with Sundsvall is the Skvader.

=== Literature ===
Famous writers from Sundsvall include Alfhild Agrell, Frida Stéenhoff and Lars Ahlin.

Since 2012, Sundsvall hosts the yearly Swedish Crime Fiction Festival (Svenska Deckarfestivalen).

=== Museums ===
The city museum is located in Kulturmagasinet, a complex of four former storage buildings that also houses the city library and venues.

=== Media ===
Sundsvalls Tidning, published since 1841, is now the only newspaper in Sundsvall.

=== Architecture ===
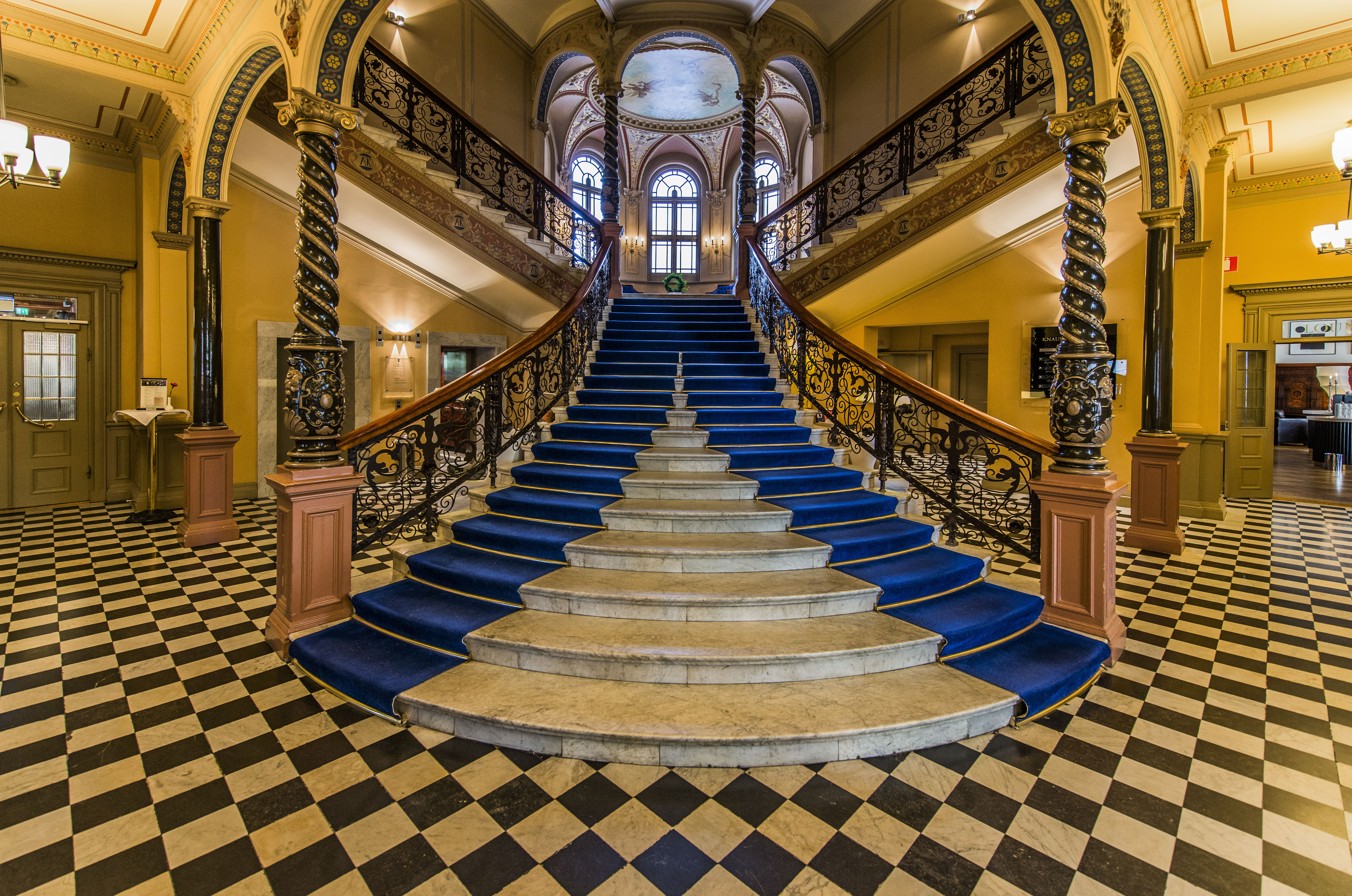
The stairs of Hotel Knaust is a famous symbol of Stenstan

Sundsvall is renowned for the architecture of its old town, commonly referred to as Stenstan. The lavish buildings were erected after the devastating fire in 1888.

In 2017, the Swedish NGO Architectural Uprising declared Sundsvall the most beautiful city in Sweden.

== Transport ==
The city is served by Sundsvall-Timrå Airport, historically and colloquially known as Midlanda. The airport provides direct flights to Stockholm which are operated by Scandinavian Airlines.

The city is also served by buses with local and city routes, the company operating the buses is Din tur

The E4 highway used to pass through the city, causing poor air quality. Since December 2014, it crosses the Bay of Sundsvall on the Sundsvall Bridge, bypassing the city.

== Sport ==
NP3 Arena is the home arena for the football club GIF Sundsvall. Other major sport venues are Södra berget (skiing, tracks, biking and other open-air sports/activities), Gärdehov (ice and indoors) and Baldershov (many indoors and summer sports).

=== Current sport clubs ===
- Alnö IF, association football
- GIF Sundsvall, association football
- IF Sundsvall Hockey, ice hockey
- IFK Sundsvall, association football
- Sundsvalls AIK (sv), wrestling
- Sundsvalls DFF, association football
- Kovlands IF, multi-sport alliance club
  - Kovlands Ishockeyförening, ice hockey
- Selånger SK, multi-sport alliance club
  - Selånger FK, association football
  - Selånger SK Bandy, bandy
- Sidsjö-Böle IF, association football
- Sund IF, association football
- Sundsvall Flames, American football
- Njurunda MK, Motocross, Enduro and Trial

=== Former sport clubs ===
- IBK Sundsvall, floorball (1986–2006)
- Sundsvall Dragons, basketball

== Notable people ==
- Otto Wallin, boxer
- Garmarna, folk band
- The Same, punk band
- Sigrid Hjertén (1885–1948), painter
- Harry Ahlin (1900–1969), actor
- Per Arne Collinder (1890–1975), astronomer (born in Sundsvall)
- Gina Dirawi (1990–), television presenter, host of Melodifestivalen 2012 and 2013
- Elin Ek (1976–), TV and radio personality (as Grynet), singer
- Fredrik Ericsson (1975–2010), extreme skier
- Jessica Falk (1973–), singer-songwriter and musician
- Anders Abraham Grafström (1790–1870), poet
- Anders Graneheim (1962–), bodybuilder
- Stan Hasselgård (1922–1948), musician
- Bengt Lindström (1925–2008), artist
- Kjell Lönnå (1936–2022), musician
- Fredrik Modin (1974–), ice hockey player
- Max Magnus Norman (1973–), artist
- Erik Ringmar (1960–), political scientist and author
- Mattias Saari (1994–), ice hockey player
- Helen Sjöholm (1970–), singer, actress and musical theater performer
- Hanna Glas (1993–), football player
- Carl Strandlund (1899–1974), Swedish-American inventor and entrepreneur
- Henrik Zetterberg (1980–), ice hockey player
- Yohio (1995–), singer and guitarist
- Kevin Walker (1989–), football player and winner of Idol 2013
- Charlotte Kalla (1987–), cross-country skier
- Carl-Herman Tillhagen (1906–2002), folklorist
- Emil Forsberg (1991–), football player
- Elias Pettersson (1998–), ice hockey player and 2019 Calder Trophy winner
- MyAnna Buring (1979–), actress (born in Sundsvall)
- Ursula Wirth (1934–2019), rally driver

== Gallery ==
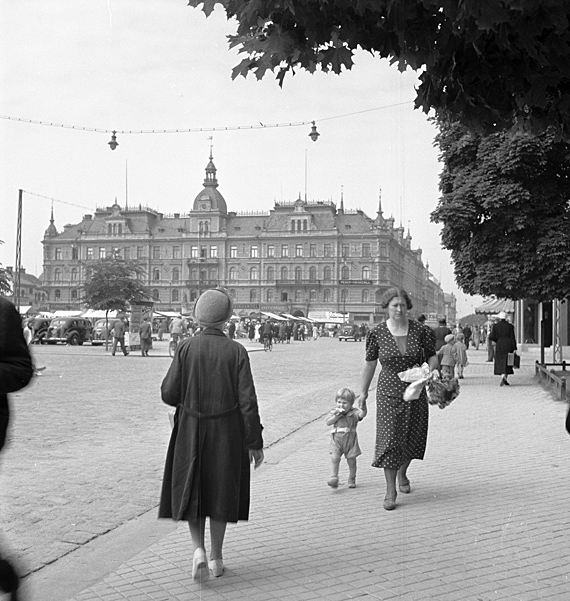
Sundsvall in the late 1930s

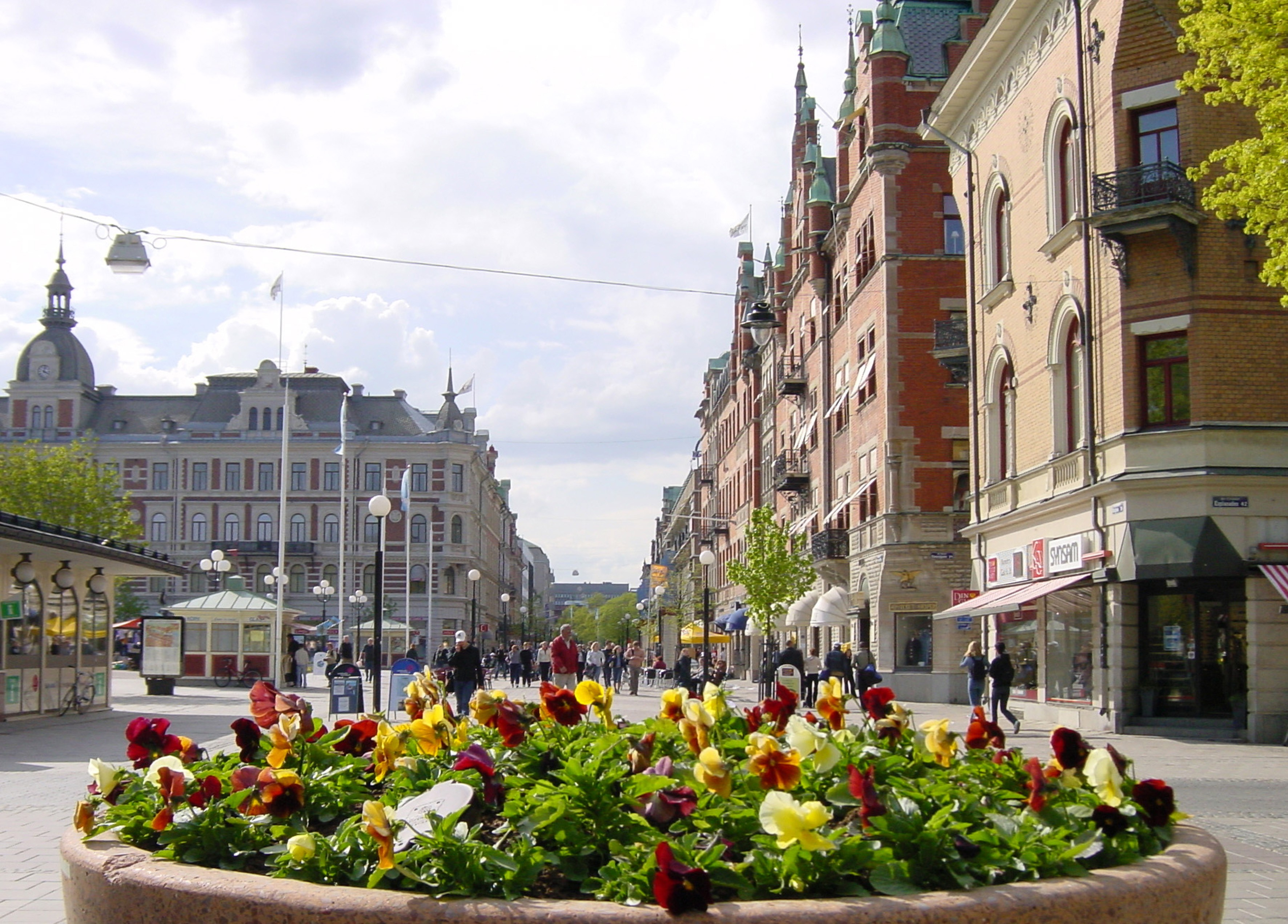
Storgatan, the main street in Sundsvall in the heart of Stenstaden ("The stone city")

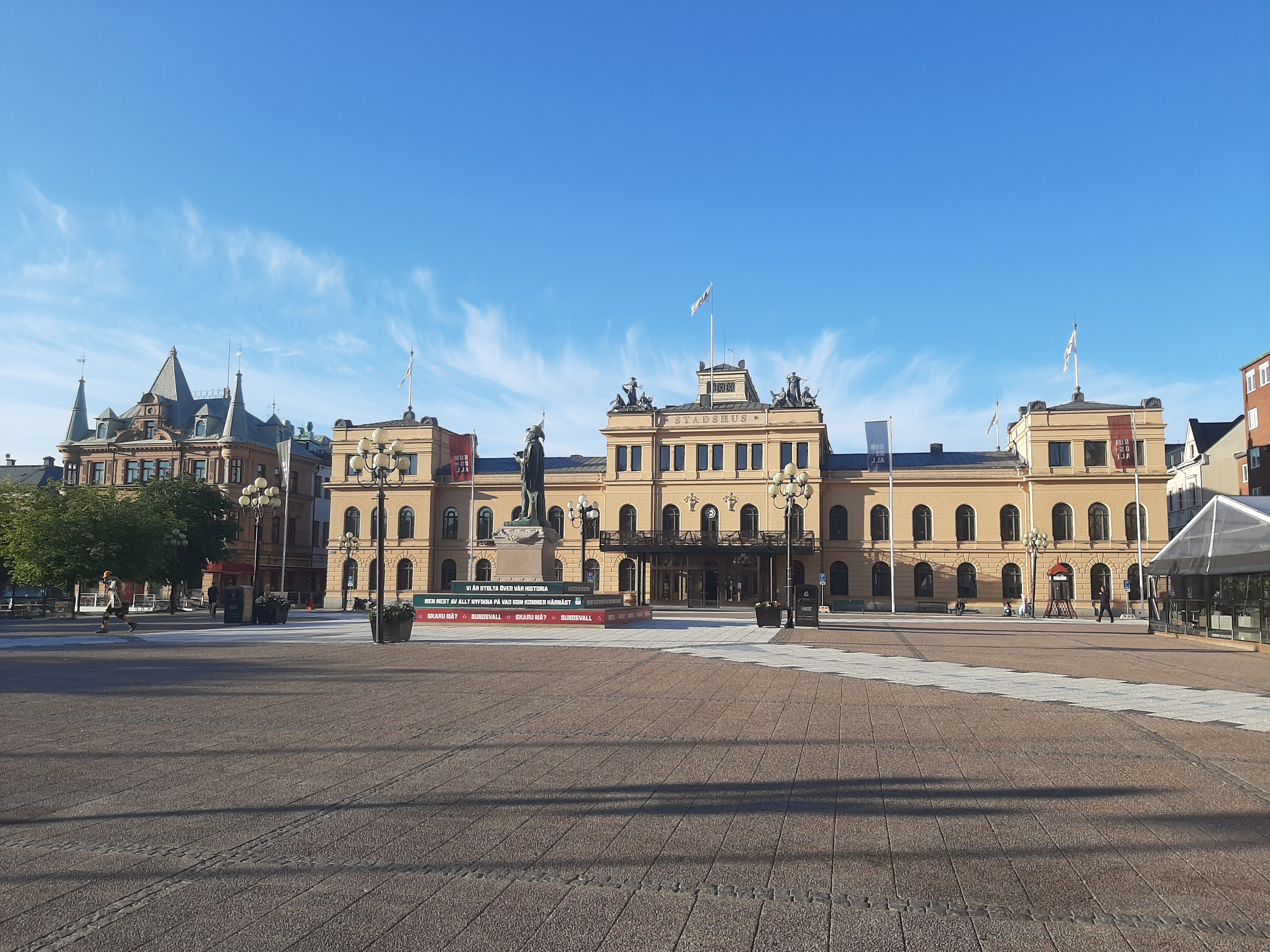
Sundsvall City Hall

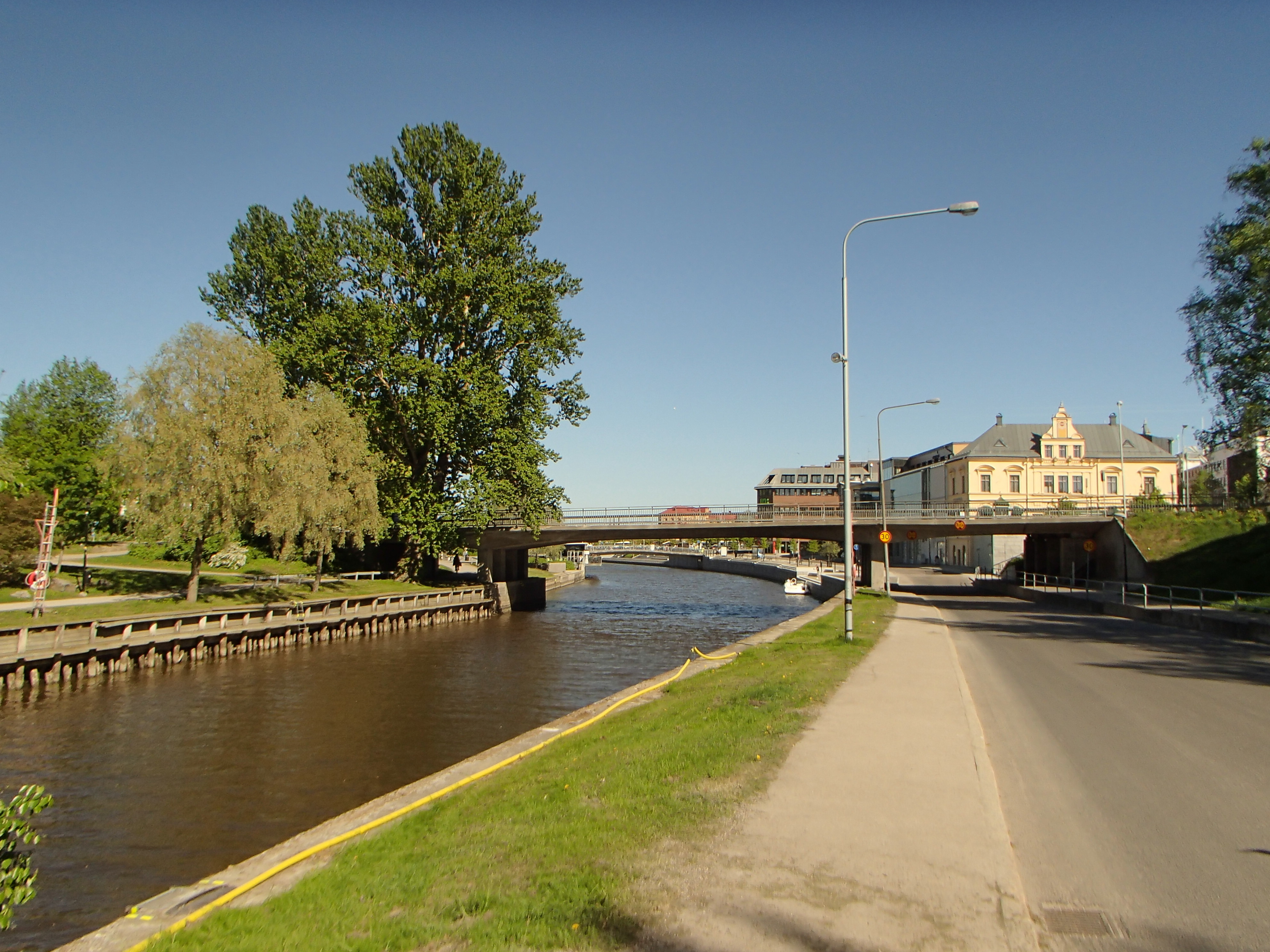
Storbron, a bridge across Selångersån river in central Sundsvall

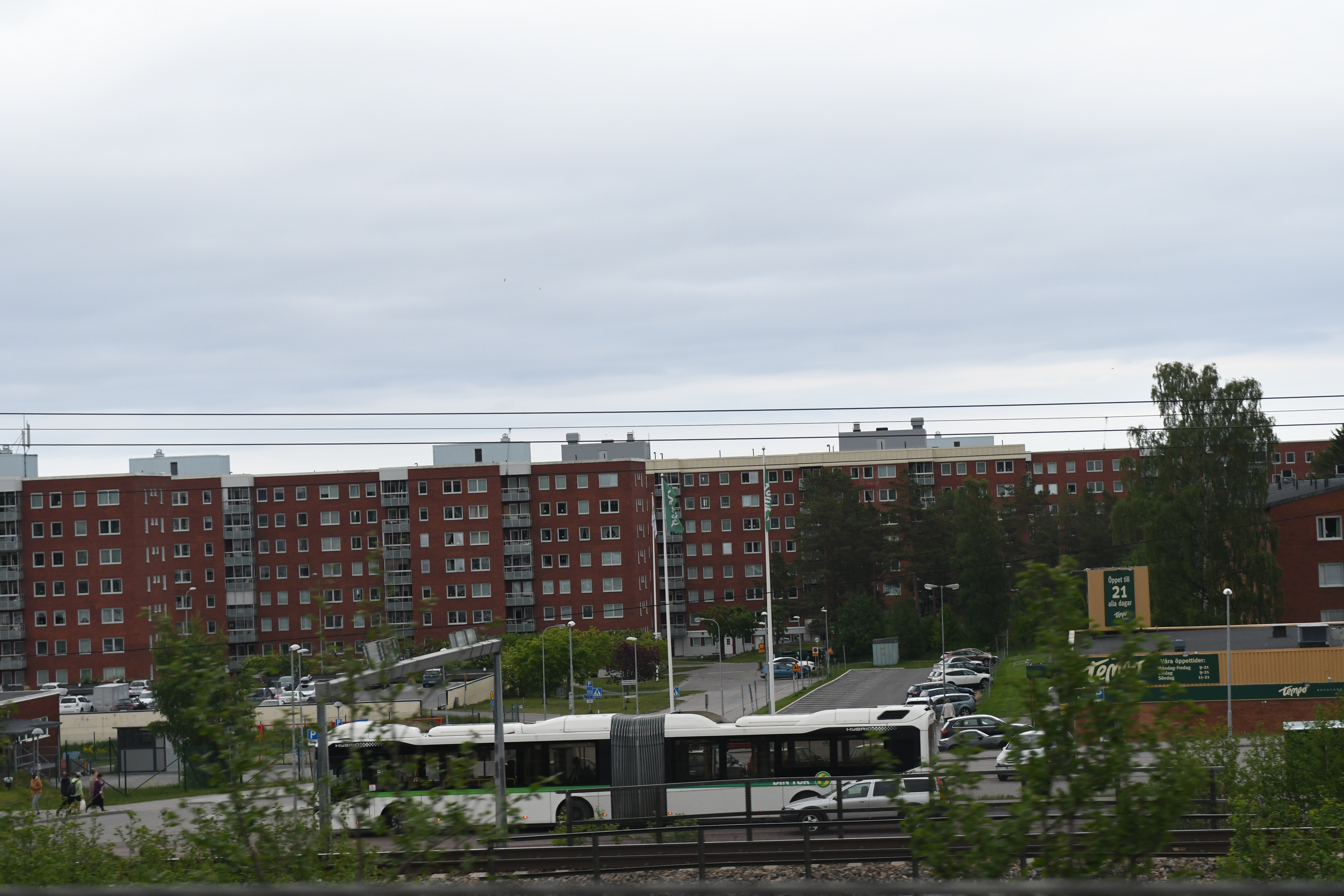
Bredsand, Stockvik in Sundsvall

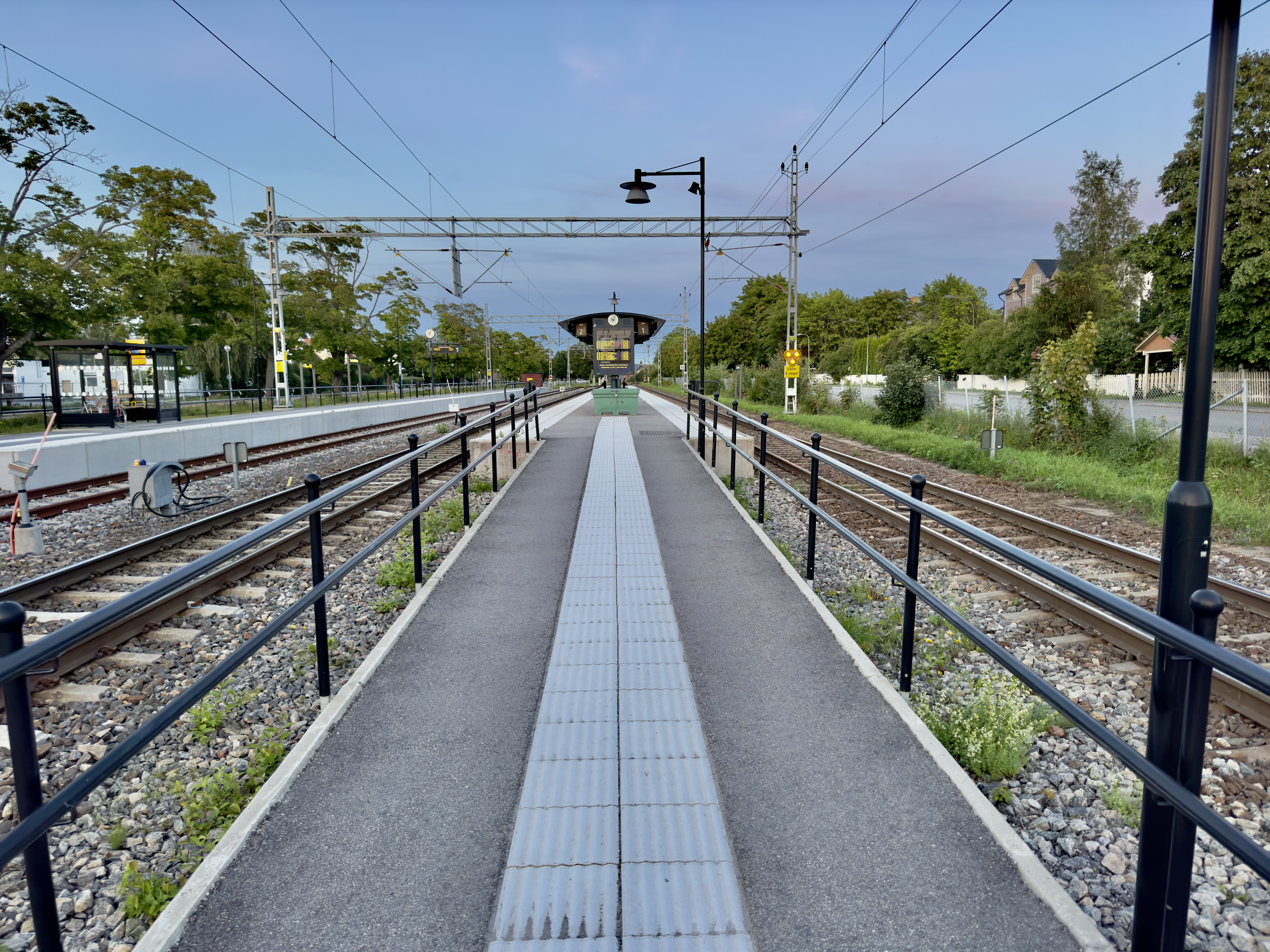
Sundsvall västra station, train station

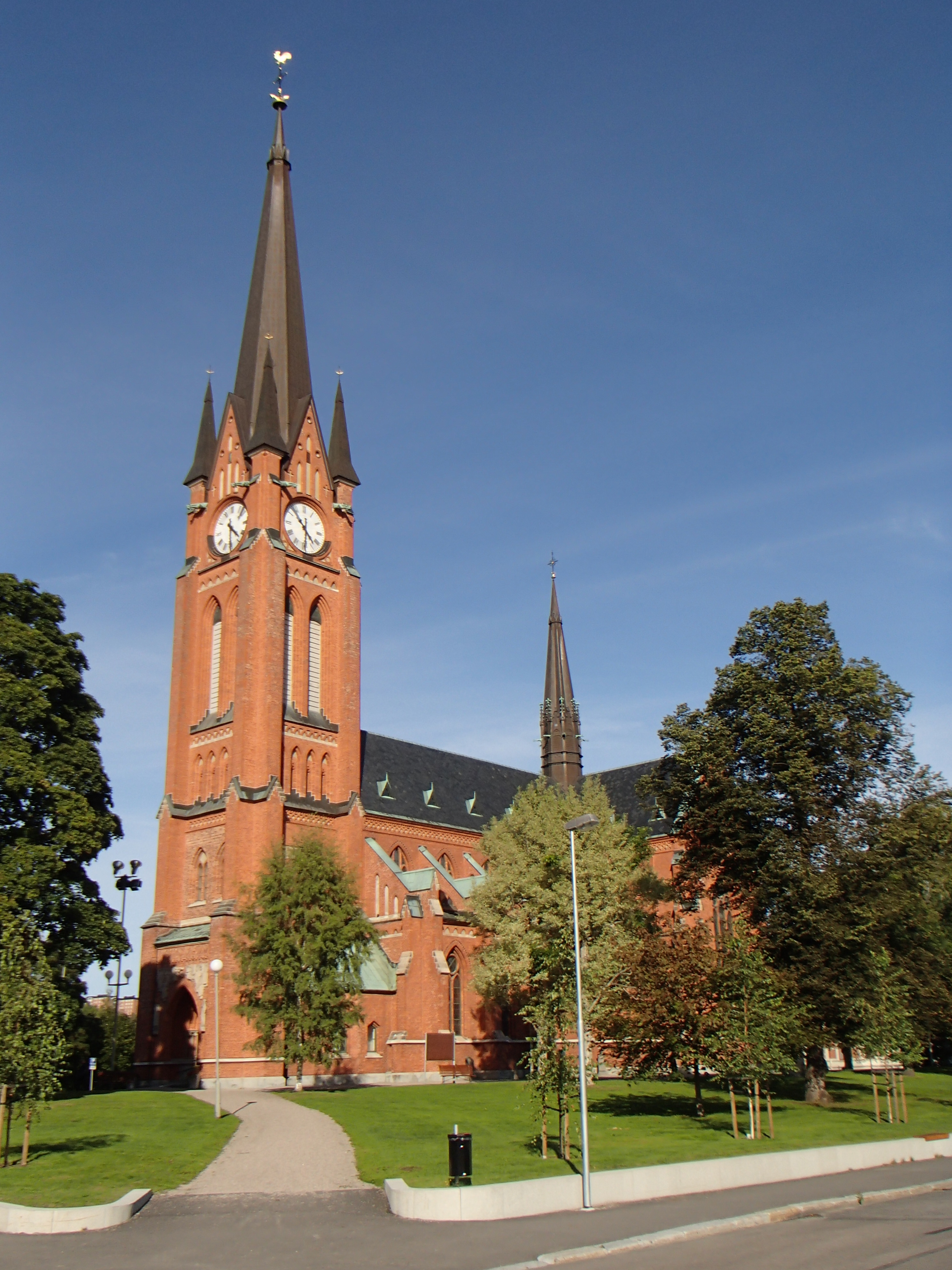
The church building of "Gustav Adolfs kyrka" at Rådhusgatan 36 in Sundsvall

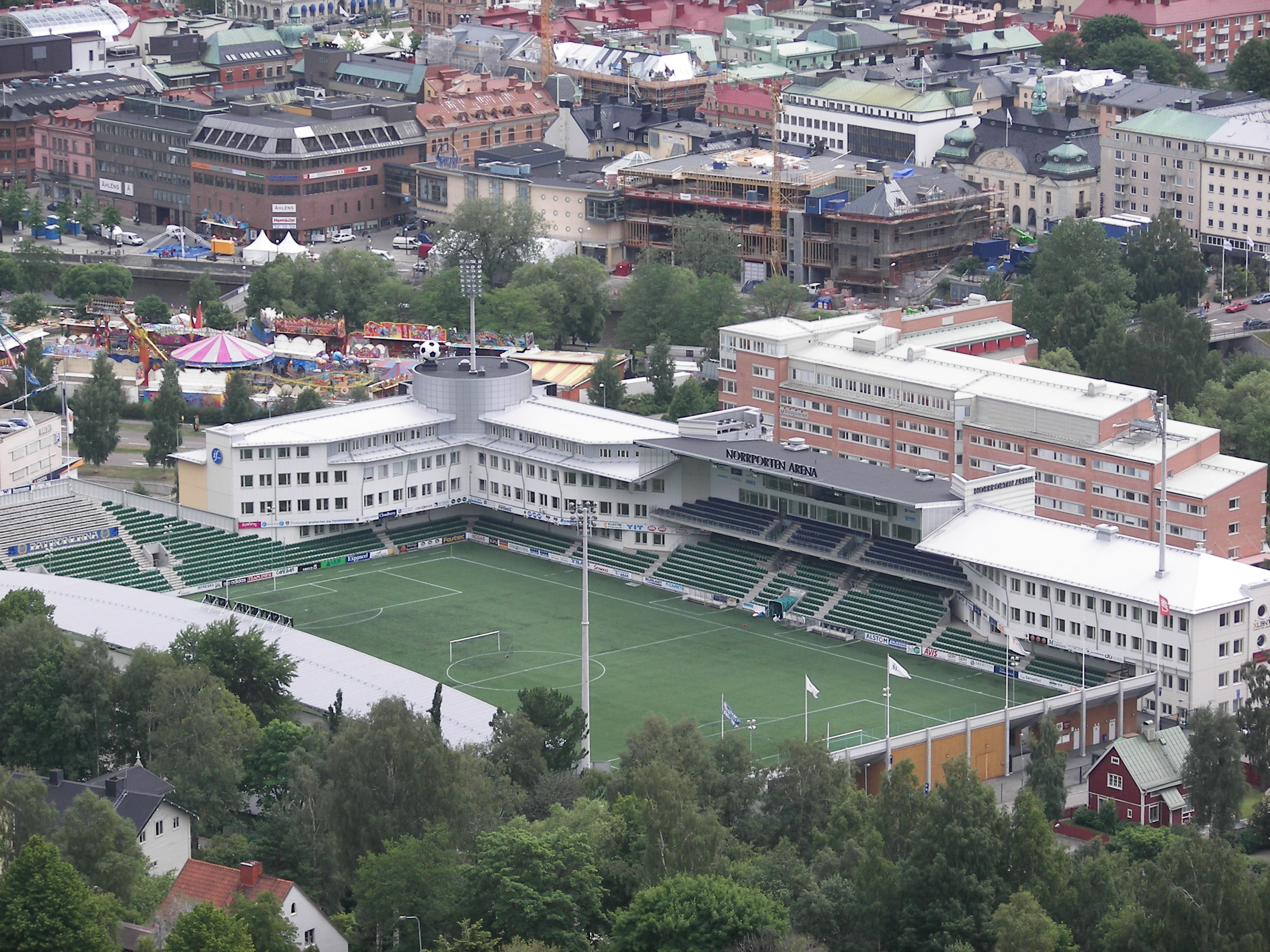
Idrottsparken, Sundsvall

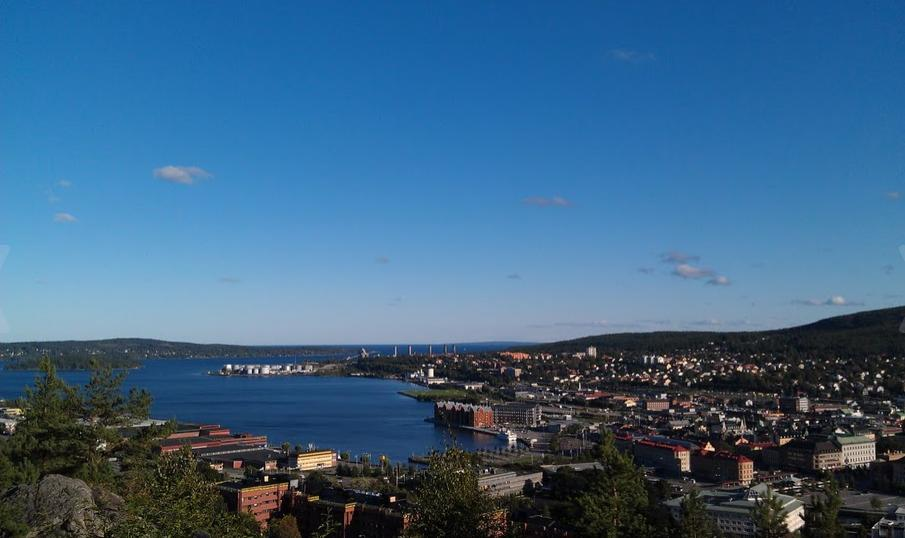
View from Norra berget, Sundsvall

== See also ==
- HSwMS Sundsvall
