= HSwMS Sundsvall =

Several ships of the Swedish Navy have been named HSwMS Sundsvall, named after the city of Sundsvall:

- Sundsvall (1675) was a ship launched in 1675
- HSwMS Sundsvall (J12) was a Visby-class destroyer launched in 1942 and decommissioned in 1982
- HSwMS Sundsvall (K24) is a Göteborg-class corvette launched in 1991 and commissioned in 1993
