= 1888 Sundsvall fire =

25 June 1888 fire in Sundsvall, Sweden

Coordinates: 62.3932°N 17.2900°E

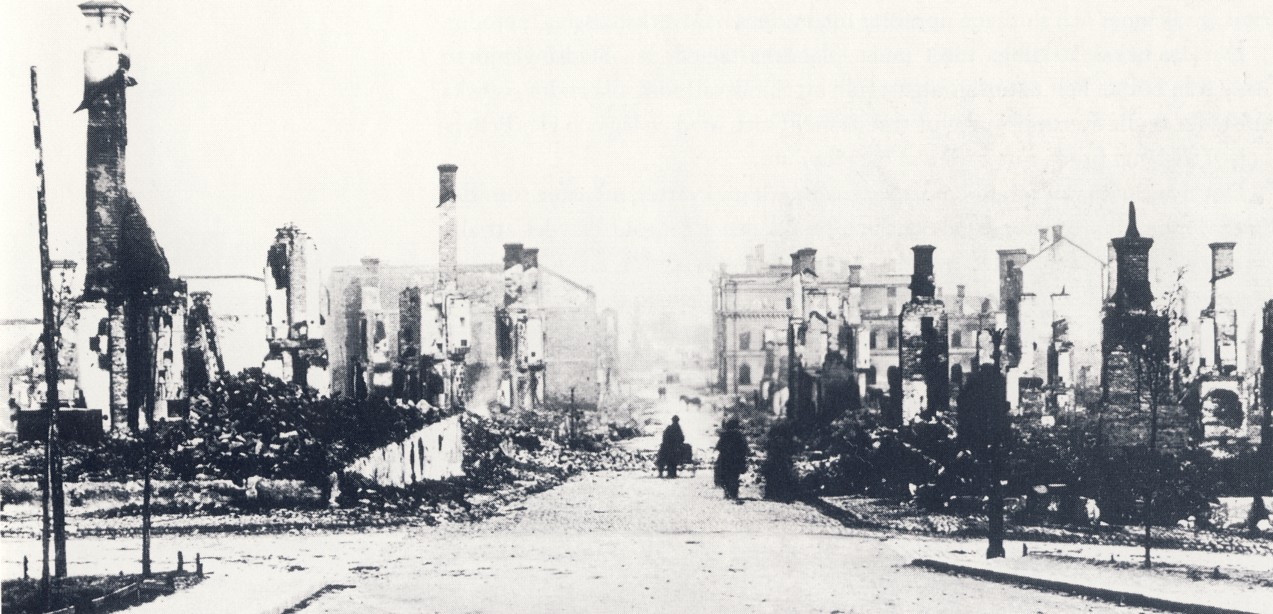
- Sundsvall following the 1888 fire.
- Native name: Branden i Sundsvall 1888
- Date: 25 June 1888
- Location: Sundsvall, Sweden
- Type: Fire
- Cause: Sparks from steam boat
- Deaths: 4
- Property damage: SEK 30,000,000 (SEK 2 billion ≈ USD 241.42 million in 2015)

The 1888 Sundsvall fire (Swedish: Sundsvallsbranden 1888) was a fire in Sundsvall, Sweden on 25 June 1888. The fire occurred during a storm, allowing the fire to spread fast among the wooden houses in town. The same day, a fire also occurred in Umeå.

== History ==
The spark from the steam boat Selånger traveling on Selångersån landed in the brewhouse of the widow Märta Charlotta Styf on Stora Nygatan. The fire was quick - and devastating. At 12:25 all of the city's bells rang to warn people that a fire had broken out. But the fire was overpowering. Strong winds to the northwest and the dry hot air made did that the wooden houses one by one soon was devoured by the flames. 9,000 people became homeless in just 9 hours. In addition to thousands of people left homeless the property damage was estimated to SEK 30 million, corresponding to almost SEK 2 billion (US$241.42 million) in 2015. In the wake of the fire the city was looted on what was left. When evening came on 25 June the city of Sundsvall was a smoking ruin.

A major investigation into the cause of the fire was started, which included hearing of the captain of Selånger. He stated that he saw smoke rising up through the bridge cabin chimney when passing the Styfska yard, a claim which, however, contested by all the witnesses. There was no other reasonable explanation than that the fire was started by sparks from one of the steamboats Selånger, or possibly Högom. Four people died in the fire: the workers Mikael Olof Norvall and Charlotta Eufrosina Askling, the maritime pilot C.E. Carlsson and a man so severely burned that he could not be identified.

The coppersmith journeyman Arvid Göhle from Hudiksvall without regard to himself saved several lives, including the wife of tailor Otzén and her newborn child that was born during the morning of that day. Without considering to first save his own belongings he went into the house and carried out the bed with the wife, the newborn baby and a little girl on the farm. With the bed set on a cart, he pulled the whole equipage through the burning city via Norrmalm and on to Heffners, away from the flames. When he returned to his own home everything he had owned was burnt.

== See also ==
- Umeå city fire
