= Surtee =

Surtee may refer to:

== People ==
- Fay Surtee Marles (born 1926), Australian civil servant
- Ismail K. Surtee, a Malawi politician, Speaker of the National Assembly of Malawi; see List of speakers of the National Assembly of Malawi
- Yusuf Surtee, a South African supplier of Madiba shirts to Nelson Mandela
- Surtee, a demonym used to refer to person from Surat district, Gujurat, India

== Other uses ==
- Surtee (horse), a racehorse, winner of the 1992 Ken Russell Memorial Classic, 1992 San Domenico Stakes, 1992 Champagne Classic (BRC), 1993 Victoria Handicap
- "Surtee" (episode), a 1969 season 2 number 22 episode 50 of the TV show The High Chaparral; see List of The High Chaparral episodes

== See also ==
- Surtees (disambiguation)
- Surte
- Surt (disambiguation)
