= Ragnar von Holten =

Swedish art historian, painter, printmaker, book illustrator and museum curator

Ragnar von Holten

Ragnar von Holten (12 March 1934 – 26 September 2009) was a Swedish art historian, painter, printmaker, book illustrator and museum curator.

== Life ==
Von Holten was born 12 March 1934 in Gleiwitz, Silesia and came to Sweden in 1937 with his family who left Nazi Germany. After graduating, he studied art history. During a trip to Paris in 1953 he had contacts who gave him the mandate on the artist Gustave Moreau. He traveled for many years between Stockholm and Paris, and he became a link between French and Swedish surrealists. He became a member of the Surrealist circle around André Breton. While he spent time in Stockholm with artists such as Eric Grate, Endre Nemes, Gösta Kriland, Öyvind Fahlström and Thea Ekström.

In 1965 he defended his thesis on Gustave Moreau, and in 1969 he published his most famous book, Surrealism in Swedish Art, regarded as a standard work. The same year, he became Associate Professor in Art History in Stockholm. He was in a sequence Senior Curator at the National Exhibition (1968–82), Nationalmuseum (1982–97) and the Moderna Museet (1998–2000). Between 1985–88 he was director of the Swedish Institute in Paris. As an artist, he made his debut in 1960 in Gothenburg and Lund. Surrealism was his theme, both in his art practice as in his art, scientific works. In 2008 he had a major retrospective exhibition at Malmö Art Museum.

Von Holten died on 26 September 2009 in Stockholm.

After his death, von Holten's art collection was donated to the Art Academy, and proceeds from sales became the nucleus for the Ragnar von Holten Memorial Fund, which would award scholarships to promising artists.
