= Surte BK =

- City: Surte, Sweden
- League: Division 1
- Division: Västra
- Founded: 1995; 30 years ago
- Home arena: Ale Arena

Surte BK is a bandy club in Bohus, Surte, Ale Municipality, Sweden. The club colours are yellow and blue. The club was founded in 1995 based on an earlier club which had gone bankrupt.

The club played in Allsvenskan, the second-level bandy league in Sweden, until 2011, when it choose to withdraw. It got promoted to Allsvenskan again in 2013, to play there during the 2014–2015 season.

== See also ==
- Category:Surte BK players
