= Kilanda Church =

Church in Ale Municipality, Älvsborg County, Sweden

Coordinates: 57°56′17″N 12°13′10″E

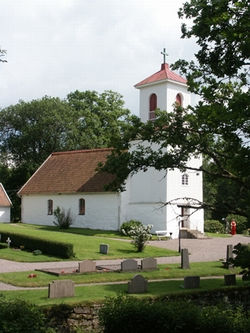
Kilanda Church

Kilanda Church (Swedish: Kilanda kyrka) is a church in Ale Municipality, about 9 kilometres (5.6 mi) east of the urban area of Älvängen, in Västergötland, Sweden. Since January 1, 2008 it has belonged to the Starrkärr-Kilanda parish in the Diocese of Gothenburg.

The small stone church dates from the 13th century. It was rebuilt in 1703 with stone, replacing the older wood. The baptismal font is from the 13th century and the pulpit from 1721. The ceiling paintings were added by Ditloff Ross in 1738–39. It was renovated in 1947–48 by the architect Sigfrid Ericson, who also designed the altarpiece in 1954. The renovation in 1947–48 gave the church an 18th-century character.
