= Alafors =

- Town
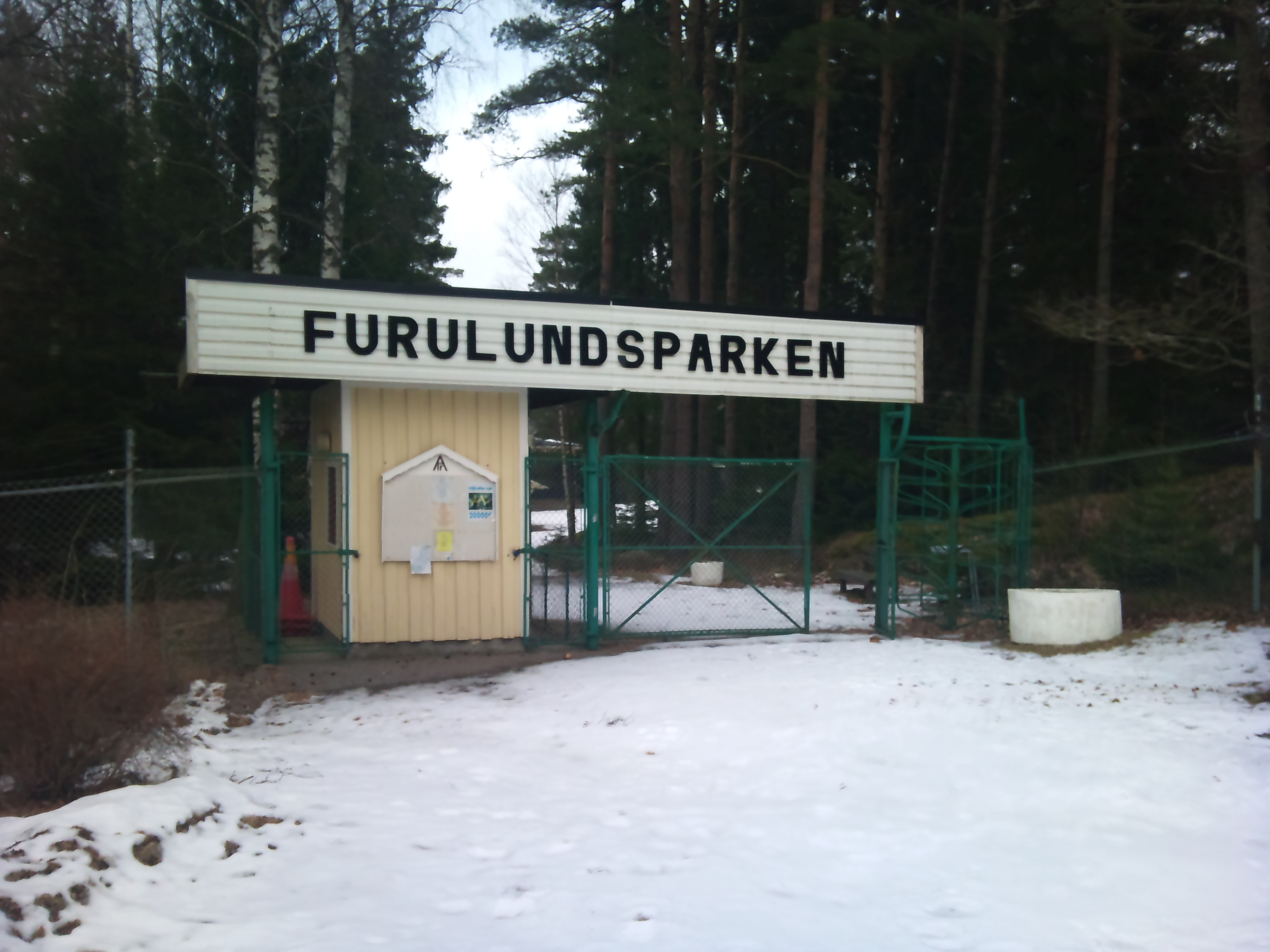
- Furulundsparken

- Location in Sweden Alafors (Sweden)
- Coordinates: 57°55′30″N 12°5′13″E
- Country: Sweden
- Province: Västergötland
- County: Västra Götaland County
- Municipality: Ale Municipality

Population (2010)
  - Total: 1,520
- Time zone: UTC+1 (CET)
  - Summer (DST): UTC+2 (CEST)

Alafors is a town and the seat of the municipality of Ale Municipality, Västra Götaland County, Sweden. Today it is considered part of Nödinge-Nol, a northeastern neighborhood. It is located off the E45, about 30 km north of Gothenburg and approximately 1 km from the east bank of the Göta River.

In 1970 the town grew alongside the railroad town Nol and 1990 with Nödinge, the three of which today form a single urban area, Nödinge-Nol. Nödinge-Nol contains the Ale municipal building, whose facade has enamel artwork by Endre Nemes. There is a high school, park, Ahlafors IF football club which play at Furulundsparken, and a ski slope. A former spinning mill was located here which ceased operations in 1966. Swedish death metal group Eructation was formed in Alafors in 1988.

== Notable people ==
- Erik Arvidsson - chess player
