= Surtees =

Surtees may refer to:

== People ==
- Surti Muslims
- Surtees (surname), an English surname

== Places ==
- Surtees Bridge, a road bridge across the River Tees in Stockton-on-Tees

== Others ==
- Surtees Racing Organisation, a British racing team and constructor
- Surtees Society, County Durham antiquarian society

== See also ==
- Surtee
- Surte
- Surt (disambiguation)
