= Starrkärr Church =

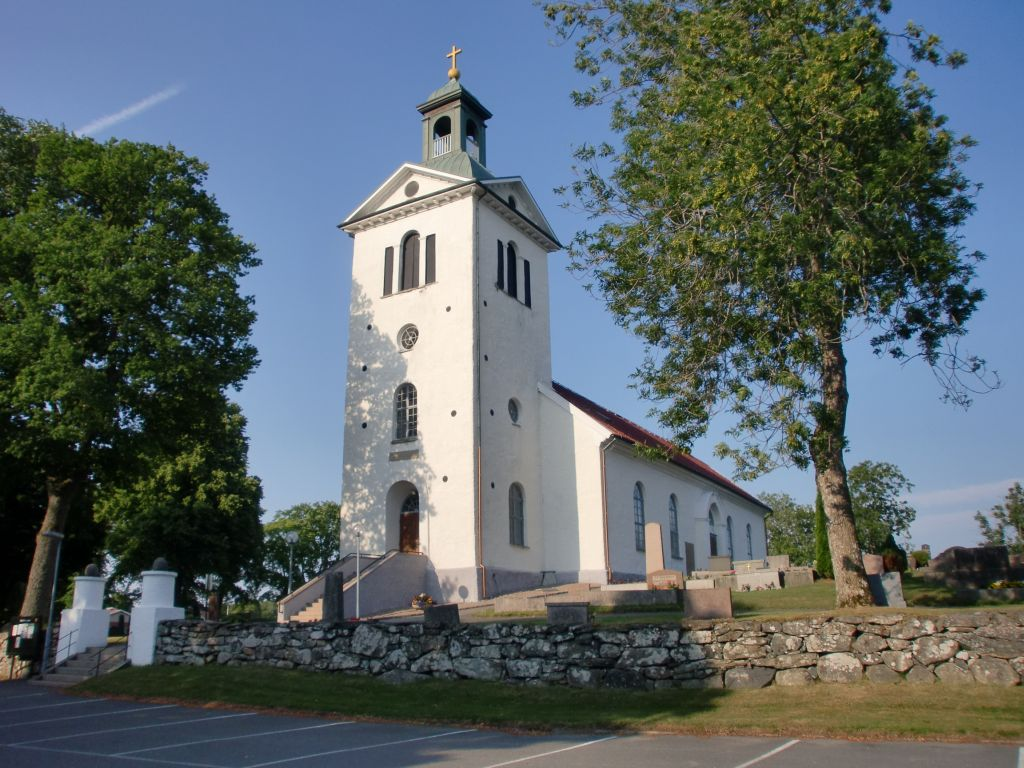
- Starrkärr Church

- Location of Starrkärr Church in Västra Götaland County
- 57°56′2.38″N 12°8′59.11″E
- Location: Starrkärr socken, Västra Götaland County
- Country: Sweden
- Denomination: Church of Sweden
- Website: Starrkärr Church

History
- Consecrated: 1842

Starrkärr Church (Swedish: Starrkärrs kyrka)is a church in Starrkärrs socken, Sweden, situated 4 km (2.5 mi) southeast of Älvängen and 8 km (5.0 mi) northeast of the locality Nödinge-Nol. It is part of the Starrkärr-Kilanda parish in the Diocese of Gothenburg. In the churchyard is also a smaller chapel, mostly used for funerals.

== History ==
Three churches, each succeeding the other, have been situated in the same location.

=== 13th century – 1721 ===
The Medieval church was probably built during the 13th century. The stone building consisted of a long nave and a small domed choir. The church had a roof made of wood shingles and a separate bell tower. Among the few furnishings in the church was a soapstone baptismal font from the 13th century. The ceiling had paintings depicting the Virgin Mary and the Child Jesus. According to 17th-century vicar Kollinius, there were also paintings of "Munks and nuns kissing each other, which is offensive in a church". At the beginning of the 1700s, the church started becoming too small for the growing congregation. It was also in poor condition, but the economical situation during the time of the Great Northern War was such that a new church could not be built.

=== 1721 – 1842 ===
The construction of the new church started in 1721. Cheap solutions during the building soon resulted in faults in the structure being revealed. As early as 1728, much of the interior in the new church was infested with dry rot. A decision to build a new church was made in 1765, since the old one was about to collapse. During an inspection in 1828, the members of the parish were advised to build yet another new church tower. This, being the present-day tower, was finished in 1832.

After a series of renovations, the parish decided to make a more comprehensive renovation of the whole church, but were advised against this by a building inspector. He recommended that a new church should be built, only the tower was to be kept.

=== 1842 – ===
The present-day church is built in a Neoclassical style. The latest renovation and conversion was done in 2000. The church interior was repainted, the floors were sanded and oiled, the choir was extended and an interior stair to the gallery was added. A play room and facilities for the church staff were also added.

== Furnishings and architecture ==
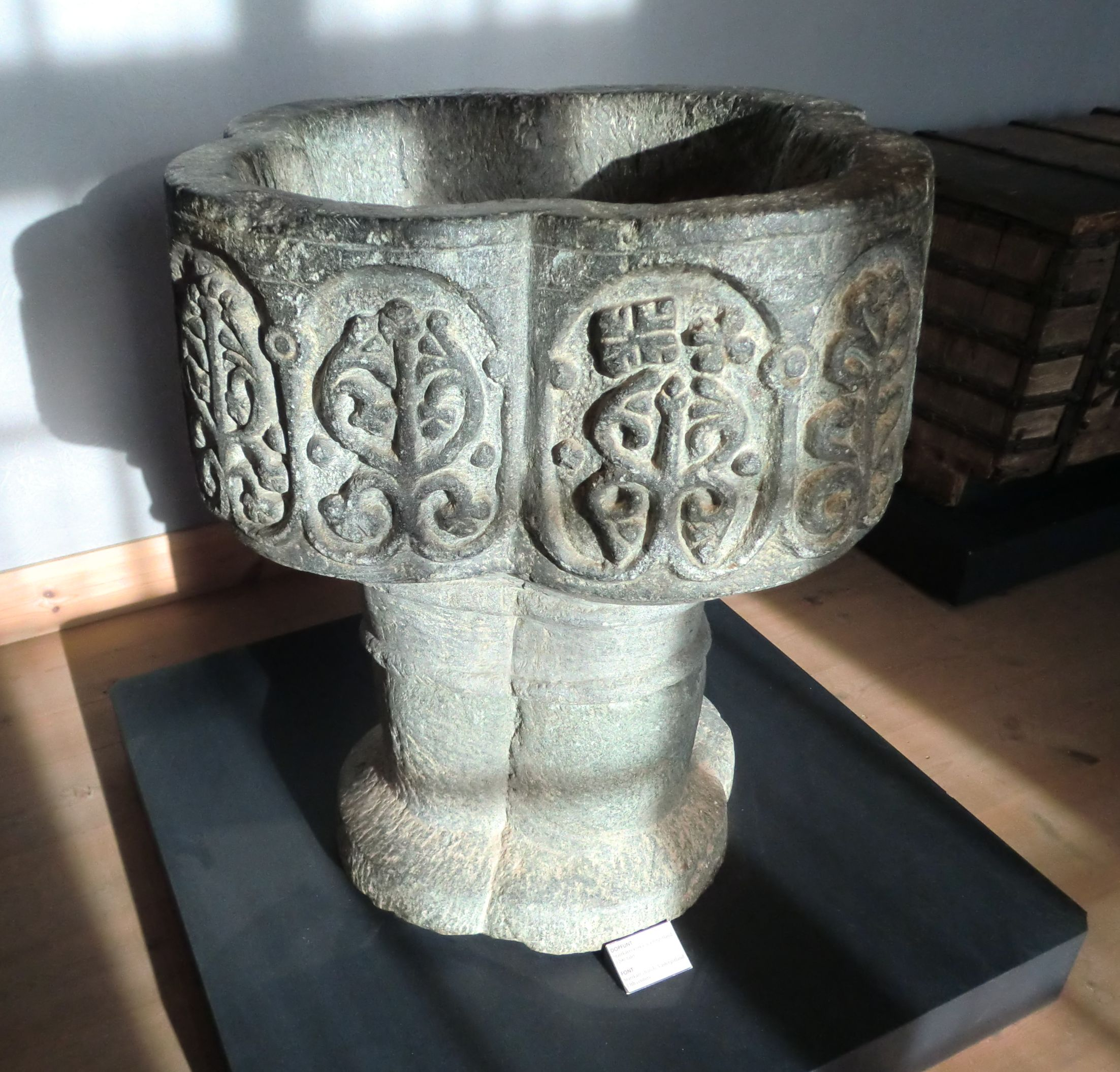
The original 13th-century baptismal font

The pulpit in Renaissance style was made in 1682 and was remodeled in 1738. The angel hanging above the pulpit was donated to the church in 1703.

The baptismal font made in 1960, by artist E. Sands was replaced in 2000, with a wooden copy of the original 13th-century font. The medieval font was donated to the Swedish History Museum in Stockholm in 1868. The font is classified by the museum as having set the tone for the Starrkärrsskolan (the Starrkärr style). A similar baptismal can be found in Vallda Church in northern Halland. Elements of the motifs on the font can also be found on the font in Stråvall Church in Varberg.

The organ has 14 stops and is made by the Magnusson Brothers in Gothenburg. An additional choir organ made by Västbo Orgelbyggeri, was added in 1969.
