= Nol Church =

Church in Nödinge-Nol, Västergötland, Sweden

Coordinates: 57°54′57″N 12°3′50″E

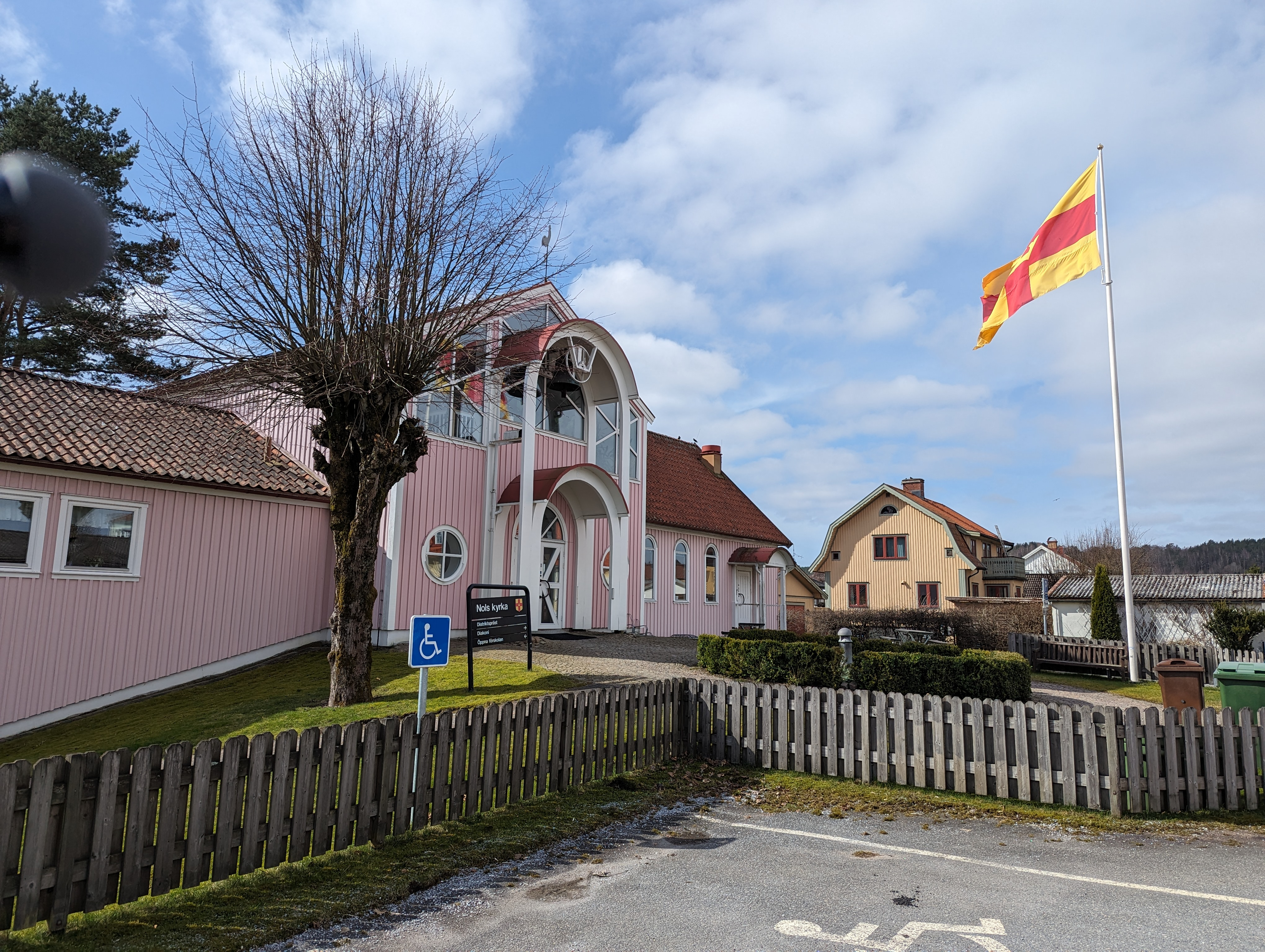
Nol Church in April 2024

Nol Church (Swedish: Nols kyrka) is a church in Nödinge-Nol, Västergötland, Sweden. It belongs to the parish of Starrkärr-Kilanda in the Diocese of Gothenburg. The church was built in 1987 by the architect Kjell Malmqvist, replacing an old mission building. The church bell was cast at the Bergholtz bell foundry in Sigtuna. The stained-glass windows in the chancel are by Roland Andersson, and the textiles in the church were woven by Christina Westman in Gothenburg. The organ was purchased in 1989 from King's Gymnasium in Stockholm, but was sold in 1999 to the Diocese of Skara and was replaced with an Ahlborn digital organ.
