= Skepplanda =

- Location within Västra Götaland Location within Sweden
- Coordinates: 57°59′N 12°12′E
- Country: Sweden
- Province: Västergötland
- County: Västra Götaland County
- Municipality: Ale Municipality

Area
  - Total: 1.04 km^{2} (0.40 sq mi)

Population (31 December 2010)
  - Total: 1,803
  - Density: 1,737/km^{2} (4,500/sq mi)
- Time zone: UTC+1 (CET)
  - Summer (DST): UTC+2 (CEST)

Skepplanda is a locality situated in Ale Municipality, Västra Götaland County, Sweden with 1,803 inhabitants in 2010.

Despite the size of the village, it has a swimming facility, a tennis court and a sports centre. Skepplanda has two different schools: Garnvindeskolan (pre-school and grades 1 to 3), Alboskolan (for grades 4 to 6), as well as a daycare centre. The town square, "Albotorget", is the core of Skepplanda. There, one can find a grocery shop, a hairdresser, a pizza place, a library and a café, as well as a clinic. Across from it, there is a parish.

Skepplanda Church, founded in the 17th century, is situated on a hilltop overlooking the main part of the village. The area around Skepplanda mainly consists of forests, meadows, some minor farmland and plains. The town itself is in a valley of sorts, which is open to the southwest. The international road E45, which is one of the longest roads in Europe, passes through some kilometres away. When students in Skepplanda finish the middle school at Alboskolan, most of them continue their studies in a town nearby called Älvängen. Älvängen is just ten minutes away by bus, and there are many more stores and boutiques there than in Skepplanda.

== History ==
During the 1960-70s the village was extended into a residential area, being mainly farmland before that. In the years 1962–1975, it grew from being a rural church village into a small town. A short industry epoch followed in the 1970s, with the placement of floor tile industry. Nowadays, the business has been largely relocated to nearby towns.

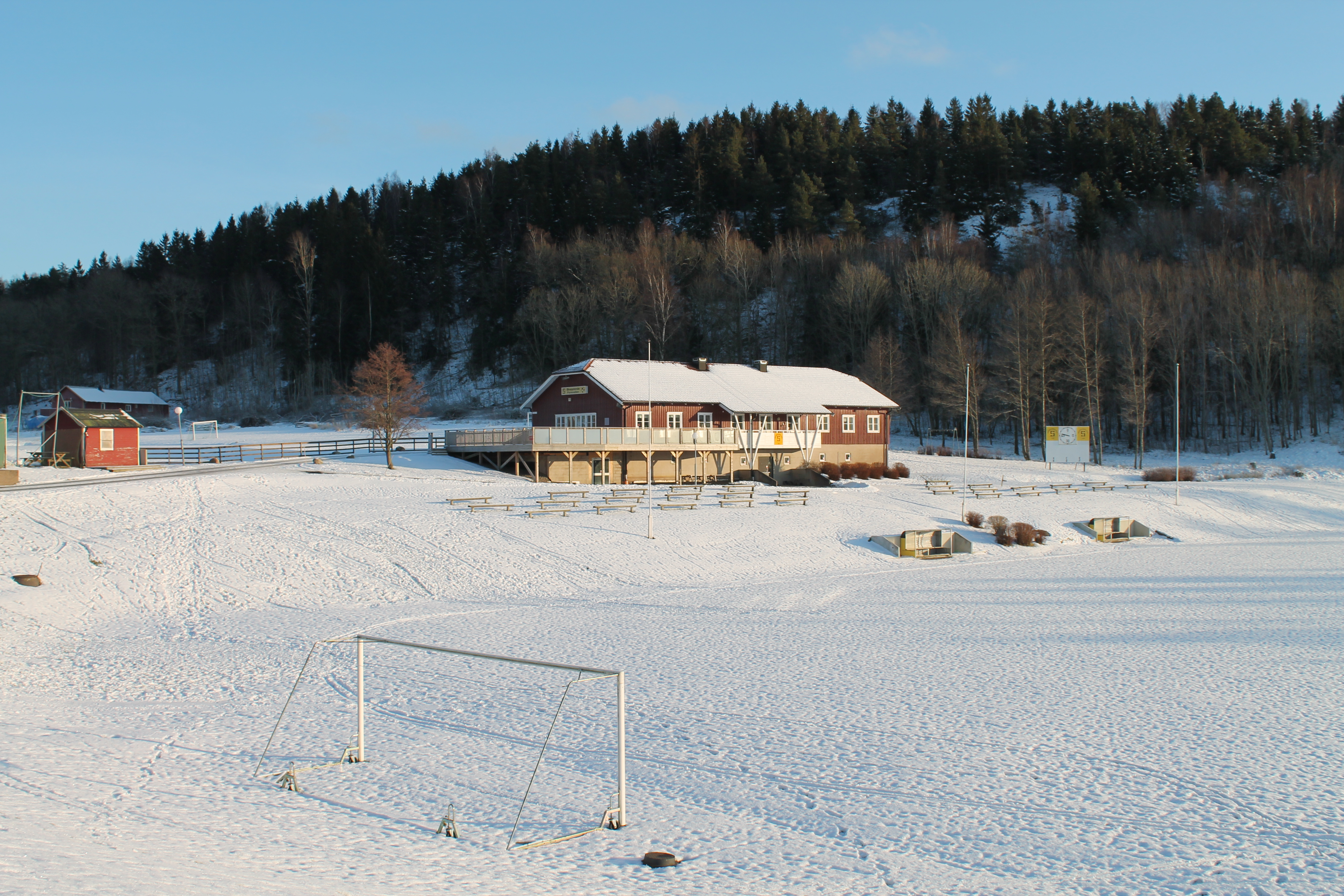
Forsvallen, Skepplanda's football stadium

== Vikings in Skepplanda ==
Skepplanda is in an area where many Viking remnants have been found. On a hill, called Stugåsberget, in the woods of Skepplanda, a rock carving of a ship can be found. This is the largest rock carving of the county and depicts a ship and a sun wheel. The sun wheel is also common in Bohuslän and is a symbol for sun worship. Except for the stone carving, traces from what is believed to be a Viking ship has been found.

”Krokodilen” Stone carving on Stugåsberget

== Sports clubs ==
SBTK – Skepplanda bordtennisklubb – Handball, soccer, hockey
