= Ahlafors Bryggerier =

Swedish microbrewery

Coordinates: 57.9251°N 12.1000°E

Ahlafors Bryggerier AB
- Location: Ale, Sweden
- Opened: 1996

Active beers
Name	Type
Ahlafors Ljusa	Pilsener
Ahlafors Sommar Spetz	Pale lager
Ahlafors Mörka	Dark lager
Ahle Ale Jubileums Bitter	Bitter
Ahle Imperial gale	Imperial stout
Ahle Slåtteröl	Premium lager
Kungälvs Lager	Premium lager

Seasonal beers
Name	Type
Ahle julöl	Christmas beer
Ahle påsköl	Easter beer
Kungälvs julöl	Christmas beer

Other beers
Name	Type
Ahlafors Päroncider	Pear Cider
Ahlafors Flädercider	Elder Cider

Ahlafors Bryggerier is a Swedish microbrewery located in Ale, Västra Götaland county. The beers can be found in a few restaurants and be bought through the order segment at Systembolaget (Västra Götaland County only). The alcohol by volume (ABV) range from 4.5% to 6.0%.

== Products ==
The brewery produces two kinds of cider: Ahlafors Päroncider (pear cider) and Ahlafors Flädercider (elder cider).

== Recognition ==
The winning beers of the Swedish homebrewing championships between 2002 and 2005 were awarded to make one full-scale brewing at Ahlafors facilities:

- 2002: Simple stout (a dry stout)
- 2003: Macka (a Scottish ale)
- 2004: Kåtisbock (an eisbock)
- 2005: Russki imponerande stout (an imperial stout)

Ahlafors Bryggerier offers guided tours and tastings at the brewery.
