= Surt =

Surt may also refer to:

== Places ==
- Sirte, a city in Libya; also called Surt
  - Sirte District, Libya
- Surt (volcano), on Jupiter's moon Io
- Surt (planet), an exoplanet

== Other uses ==
- Surtr, a figure in Norse myth, also called Surt

== See also ==
- Surte
- Surtee
- Surtees (disambiguation)
