= Älvängen Church =

Church building in Älvängen, Västergötland, Sweden

Coordinates: 57°57′29″N 12°7′12″E

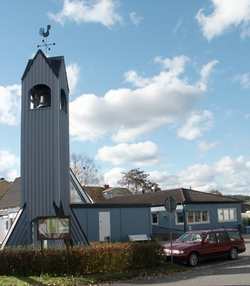
Älvängen Church

Älvängen Church (Swedish: Älvängens kyrka) is a church in Älvängen, Västergötland, Sweden. It belongs to Skepplanda-Hålanda parish in the Diocese of Gothenburg. Älvängens Church is a modern church, built in 1970 by architect T. Hansson and manufactured by Öresjö sektionshus. In 1982 it was extended under Kjell Malmqvist, during which a bell tower was added at the side of the church. The clock in the bell tower was cast at the Bergholtz bell foundry in Sigtuna. The following year the church was reopened. The altarpiece of wood was painted by Harry W. Smith. The textiles in the church were made by Christina Westman in Gothenburg. The original organ, a Grönvalls, was inaugurated in 1977, but it was sold in 1999 and replaced with a digital organ of the brand Ahlbom.
