= Imaginisterna =

Group of Swedish painters

Imaginisterna (Swedish for the Imaginists) was a group of Swedish painters formed 1945 and dissolved 1955. Seeking an alternative approach to surrealism they turned away from the detailed style of Salvador Dalí and looked for inspiration from artist such as Max Ernst, Paul Klee and abstract expressionism.

== Notable members ==
- Max Walter Svanberg
- Carl-Otto Hultén
- Anders Österlin
- Gösta Kriland
