= Ale Hundred =

Hundred of Västergötland in Sweden

Ale Hundred Ale härad
- Hundred of Sweden
- Coat of arms

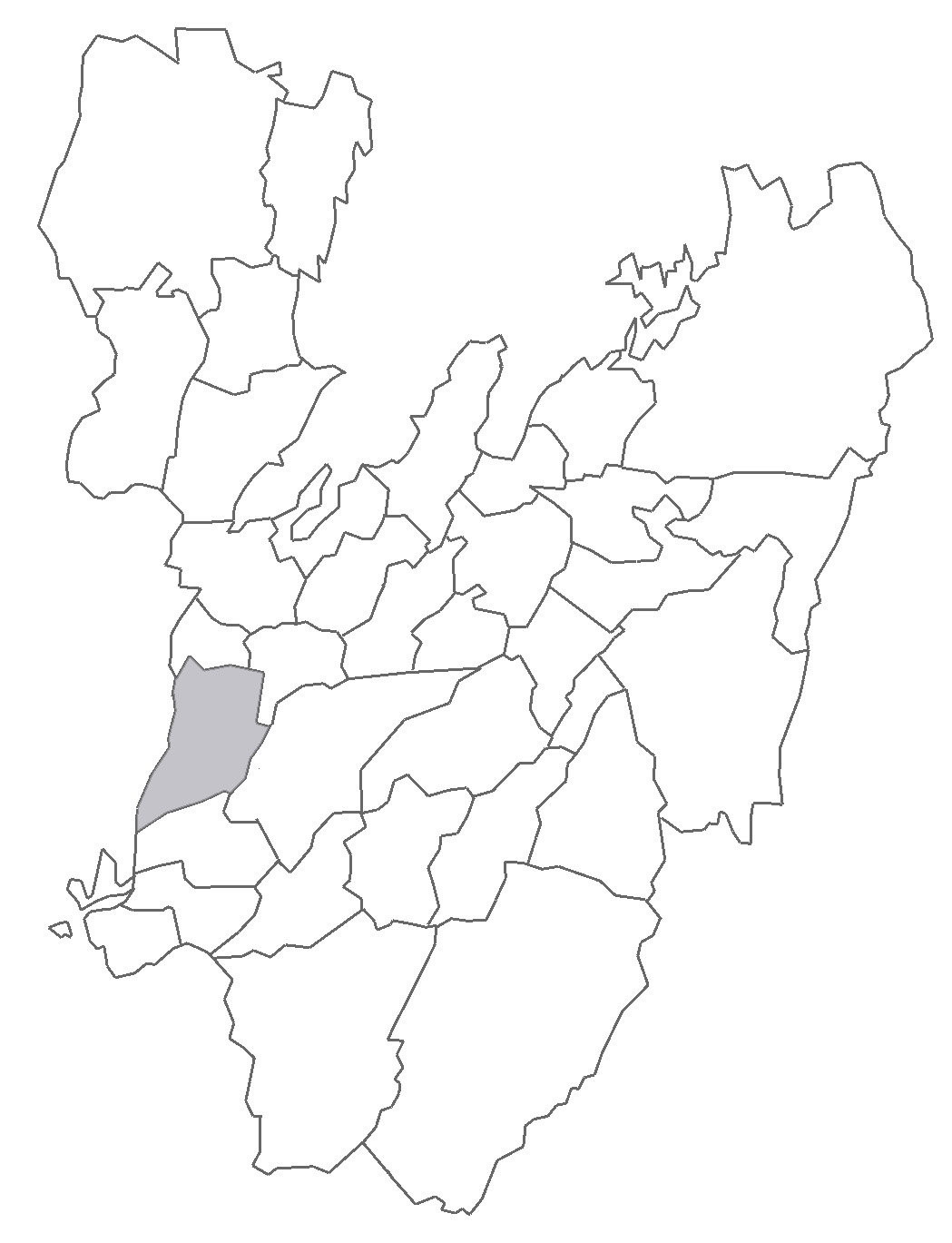
- Location within Västergötland

Ale Hundred, or Ale härad, was a hundred of Västergötland in Sweden. It covered the area between Göta älv and Lake Anten.

== See also ==
- Ale Municipality
