= The High Chaparral =

American television series (1967–1971)

- Genre: Western
- Created by: David Dortort
- Starring: Leif Erickson; Cameron Mitchell; Henry Darrow; Linda Cristal; Mark Slade; Don Collier; Frank Silvera; Rudy Ramos
- Theme music composer: David Rose
- Composer: Harry Sukman
- Country of origin: United States
- Original language: English
- No. of seasons: 4
- No. of episodes: 98 (list of episodes)

Production
- Production company: Xanadu Productions in association with NBC

Original release
- Network: NBC
- Release: September 10, 1967 – March 12, 1971

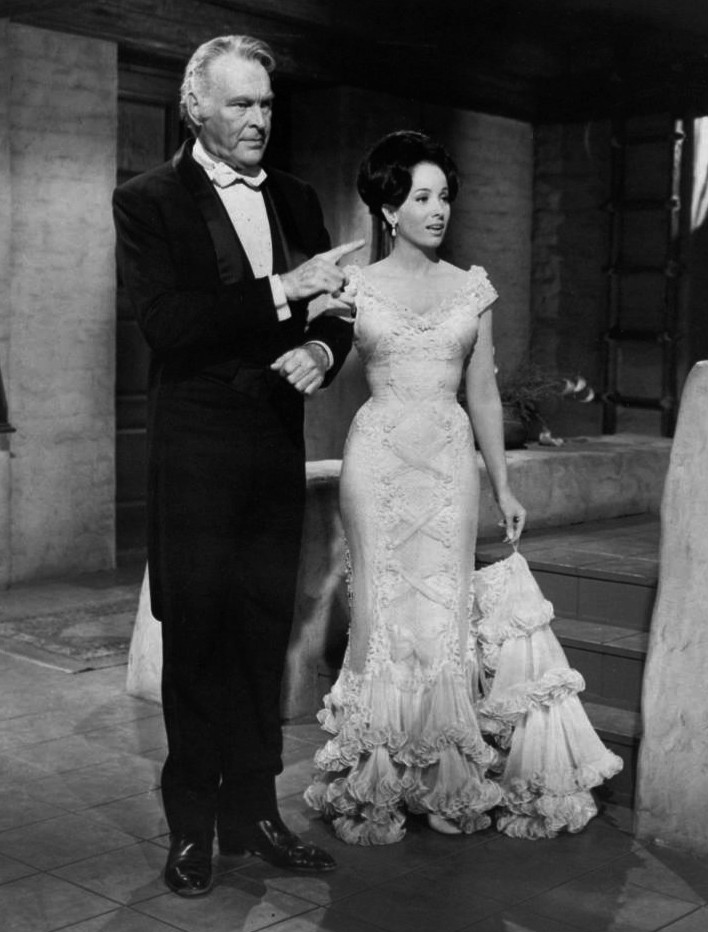
Leif Erickson and Linda Cristal (John and Victoria Cannon)

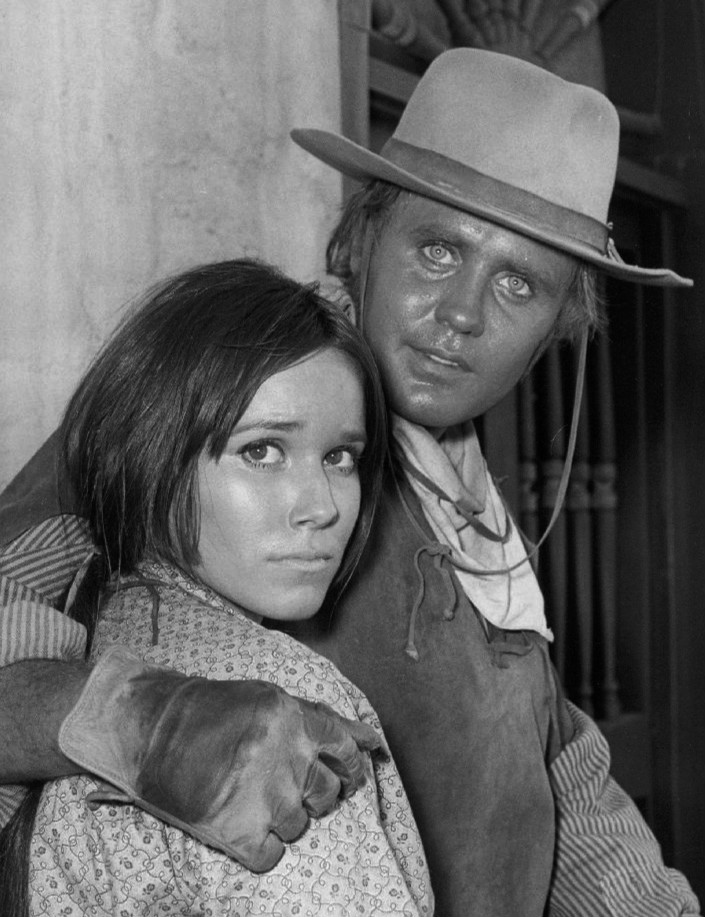
Guest star Barbara Hershey and Mark Slade (Blue Boy)

The High Chaparral is an American Western action-adventure drama television series that aired on NBC from 1967 to 1971, starring Leif Erickson and Cameron Mitchell. The series was made by Xanadu Productions in association with NBC Productions, and was created by David Dortort, who had previously created Bonanza for the network. The theme song was written and conducted by Bonanza scorer David Rose, who also scored the two-hour pilot.

== Episodes ==
Season	Episodes	Originally released	
Season	Episodes	First released	Last released
1	28	September 10, 1967	March 31, 1968
2	26	September 20, 1968	April 4, 1969
3	26	September 19, 1969	May 5, 1970
4	18	September 18, 1970	March 12, 1971

== Cast and characters ==
The show is set in the 1870s, and revolves around "Big John" Cannon (Erickson), a rancher living in the dry desert of the southern Arizona Territory, near the Mexican border, in Apache Indian country. John runs a ranch, called "The High Chaparral" (named by his first wife Anna-Lee, for a local plant/brush), with his brother Buck (Mitchell) and his own son Billy Blue (usually referred to as "Blue" or "Blue Boy") (Mark Slade). Blue Boy's mother, Anna-Lee Cannon (Joan Caulfield), is killed in the first episode by an attacking Apache Indian arrow. John then marries a beautiful Mexican woman named Victoria (Linda Cristal), 30 years his junior, the daughter of powerful neighboring Mexican rancher Don Sebastián Montoya (Frank Silvera), in what is initially a marriage of convenience. She soon comes to appreciate his strength and character, falls in love with him and becomes very supportive. John's marriage to Victoria also brings her brother Manolito (Henry Darrow) to live with the American "gringo" family on the extensive ranch. Bart Kellogg (Gene Rutherford) was a recurring mountain man who showed his charm in the town.

Among the many frequent guest stars were Rico Alaniz, Richard Bradford, Scott Brady, Rory Calhoun. Anthony Caruso, Chief Dan George, Dennis Cross, Jim Davis, John Dehner, Bruce Dern, Charles Durning, Paul Fix, Steve Forrest, Ron Foster, Ted Gehring, Frank Gorshin, Ron Hagerthy, Ron Hayes, Myron Healey, Barbara Hershey, Don Keefer, Dan Kemp, Robert Loggia, Jack Lord, Tyler McVey, Ricardo Montalbán, Joanna Moore, Robert Pine, Nehemiah Persoff, Denver Pyle, Stuart Randall, Gilbert Roland, Ned Romero, Kurt Russell, Frank Silvera, Barry Sullivan, William Sylvester, William Tannen, Dub Taylor, Paul Winfield, and Morgan Woodward.

== Series format ==
The two-hour opening episode establishes the background to the action, bringing "Big John" Cannon and his family and brother Buck to the frontier high desert scrubland in the southern Arizona Territory near the border with Mexico, where they buy a run-down hacienda and establish a cattle ranch on it. The Apaches, under the leadership of Cochise, are hostile; John's wife Anna-Lee is killed in an early attack, and to survive, the Cannons are compelled to enter into an alliance with a rich and powerful neighboring rancher, Don Sebastian Montoya, who owns a huge estate on the Mexican side of the border adjoining the "High Chaparral".

Part of the price for the alliance is the sealing of the pact by the marriage of John Cannon to Montoya's beautiful, dark-haired, sophisticated daughter, Victoria, 30 years younger. Montoya's reckless son, Manolito, whose relationship with his father is strained, accompanies his sister to get away from Don Sebastian. John's son, Blue, is vehemently opposed to the strange "mixed marriage", coming so soon after Anna-Lee's death.

Reinforced by Montoya's men, the Cannons are able to fight off the Indian attacks, and with the services of Manolito as interpreter, manage to negotiate a truce, albeit a fragile one, with the Apache leader. The main reason for its fragility is that the U.S. Cavalry refuses to recognize Cannon's right to negotiate a private peace with the Apaches, and continued Army interference constantly threatens the unofficial treaty. Problems also frequently occur between the Cannons and the arrogant, resentful Don Sebastian, usually concerning the terms of their alliance.

Big John's brother, Buck, notionally the ranch's head cowhand, was a hard-bitten former soldier, who fought in the American Civil War, 10 years previously, on the side of the Confederacy. From time to time, Buck's past comes back to haunt him, usually in the person of other Confederate soldiers drifting through the territory, forever unable to return to their homes in the defeated South. Occasionally, friction occurred because foreman Buck's brother Big John had also fought in the war, but on the other side, as a captain in the Union Army.

The series gradually evolved to make Manolito and Buck the most prominent characters, as they were the ones who tended to get into trouble; both were somewhat irresponsible, particularly under the influence of drink. For what was generally regarded as a serious Western television series, their scenes provided "comic relief" for the show. The other characters were gradually marginalized. Cattle ranching almost never featured in the storylines, which, whenever Mexican bandit or Indian troubles were not imminent, were much more likely to revolve around personal issues of drama with Manolito or Buck and some form of hell-raising – gambling, fighting, women, or whiskey (or a combination of them).

There were two significant cast changes in the final season. Mark Slade (Blue Boy) was replaced by Rudy Ramos as Wind, a passing, mysterious half-Pawnee cowhand who often acted as go-between for the ranchers and the Indians. Frank Silvera (Don Sebastian Montoya) died during production, and his place was taken by Gilbert Roland as Don Sebastian's brother, Don Domingo, inheritor of Rancho Montoya. The fourth season also had new opening titles and a new arrangement of the popular theme music.

=== Name of the ranch ===
The name was explained by the following dialogue in episode one:

Anna-Lee Cannon: Isn't it beautiful, John? It should have a name.
Big John Cannon: You name it.
Anna-Lee: What is that bush called — that green one?
Big John: Chaparral.
Anna-Lee: That's it — Chaparral. I christen thee "The High Chaparral" — the greatest cattle ranch in the whole territory ... the whole world!

In the true sense of the word, "chaparral" is not a single species of shrub, but a bionomic community of desert flora located near a coast, especially that in coastal southern California. The name comes from the Spanish word for scrub oak, chaparro, which is seldom found further east in Arizona as native flora. Some colloquial use of the term in Arizona describes the low-growing sage, mesquite, and palo verde, which are native to the area, especially in the higher desert, but the high Sonoran Desert in southern Arizona plant community is more properly called a "xeric" shrublands biome.

== Production ==
The High Chaparral was producer Dortort's new brainchild, and he left the day-to-day running of his earlier success Bonanza (1959–1973) in the spring of 1967 so he could focus all of his energies on The High Chaparral.

All the exterior filming was done at the Old Tucson Studios near Tucson, Arizona (site of frequent movie-making for several decades), and in the nearby Saguaro National Park, although in a few later episodes some filming was done in California, and (in season three) in the Coronado National Forest south of Tucson. The interiors were generally filmed at the NBC television studios in Burbank.

== Syndication ==
The series has appeared on The CBN Family Channel, Hallmark Channel, INSP, Heroes & Icons, and as of October 2025, on WEST.

== Home media ==
On May 20, 2010, the first worldwide release of season one on DVD occurred in Germany (Kinowelt, now Studiocanal), with the original soundtrack in English and an optional soundtrack dubbed into German. Season two was released on December 9, 2010. Season three was released June 9, 2011. The final season was released on February 16, 2012. On disc one, episode one starts with some scenes shown on German TV that were not in the original, thus dubbed German instead of English for a few minutes.

Art-S Home Entertainment (www.art-s.nl) in the Netherlands released the first box with season one (28 episodes) on May 2, 2012. Season two released on January 28, 2013. Season three released on September 3, 2013, and the final season released January 26, 2014.

The High Chaparral is also released in Sweden with each season in two boxes. In Australia, they have also released The High Chaparral in four boxes.

The first and second seasons has been released by Shout! Factory in the United States. The third season was released in April 2019.

Season	Episodes	Region 1	Region 2 Germany	Region 2 Netherlands	Region 2 Sweden	Region 4 Chile	Region 4 Australia
Season 1	28	August 28, 2018	May 20, 2010	May 2, 2012	October 30, 2012	November, 2012	March 13, 2013
Season 2	26	December 11, 2018	December 9, 2010	January 28, 2013	March 19, 2013	December, 2012	May 8, 2013
Season 3	26	April 23, 2019	June 9, 2011	September 3, 2013	July 31, 2013	January, 2013	August 7, 2013
Season 4	18	December 10, 2019	February 16, 2012	January 26, 2014	October 8, 2013	February, 2013	January 15, 2014

== See also ==
- High Chaparral Theme Park (Sweden)
