= Pontus Dahlberg =

Swedish footballer (born 1999)

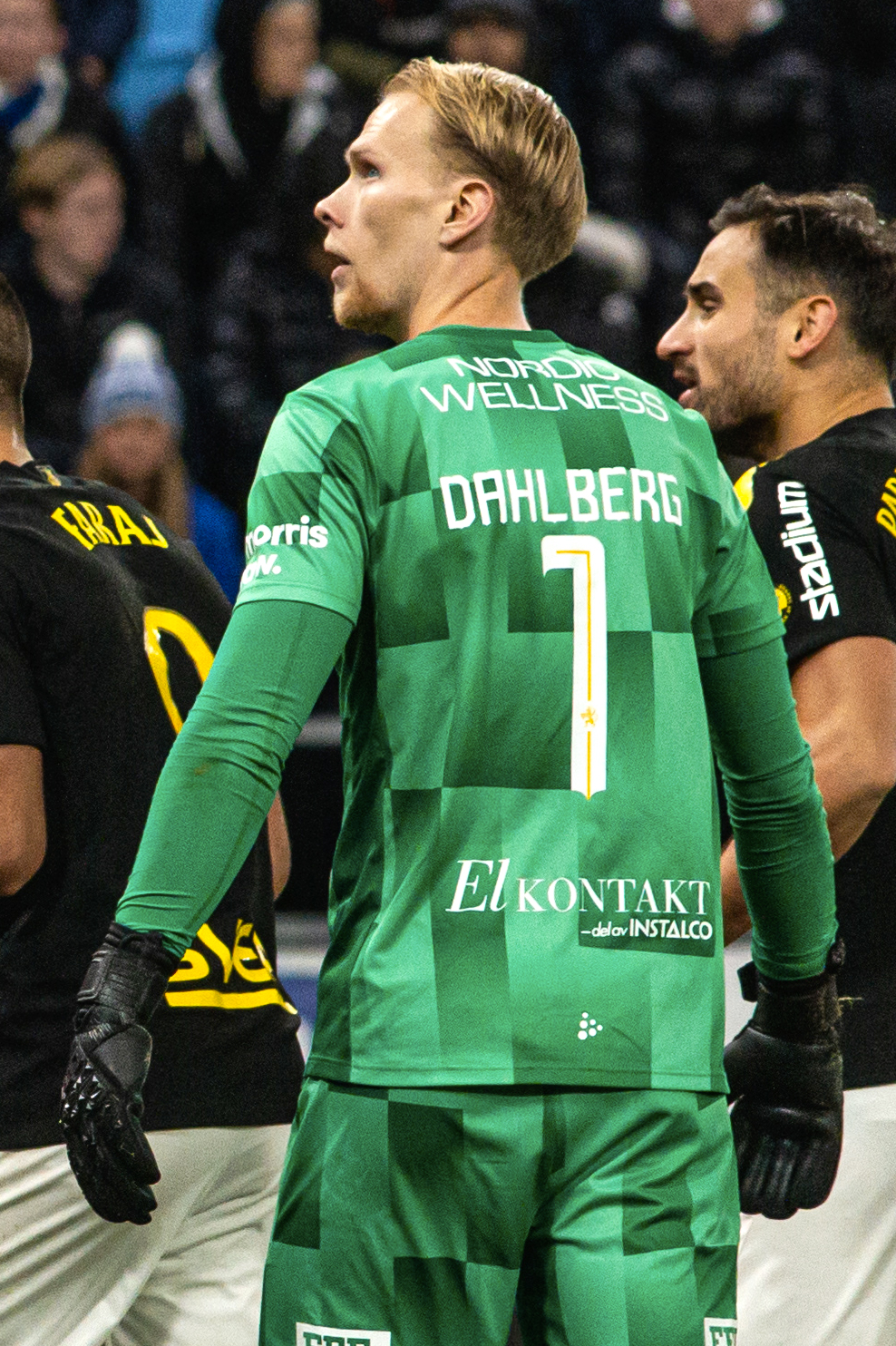

Personal information
- Full name: Pontus Jacob Ragne Dahlberg
- Date of birth: 21 January 1999 (age 27)
- Place of birth: Älvängen, Sweden
- Height: 1.94 m (6 ft 4 in)
- Position: Goalkeeper

Team information
- Current team: Lillestrøm
- Number: 12

Youth career
- 2006–2012: Älvängens IK
- 2015–2016: IFK Göteborg

Senior career*
Years	Team	Apps	(Gls)
2013–2014	Älvängens IK	33	(0)
2016–2017	IFK Göteborg	29	(0)
2018–2022	Watford	0	(0)
2018	→ IFK Göteborg (loan)	10	(0)
2020	→ Emmen (loan)	0	(0)
2020–2021	→ BK Häcken (loan)	22	(0)
2021–2022	→ Doncaster Rovers (loan)	18	(0)
2022	→ Gillingham (loan)	6	(0)
2022–2025	IFK Göteborg	36	(0)
2026–	Lillestrøm	14	(0)

International career
2014–2016	Sweden U17	19	(0)
2016	Sweden U19	3	(0)
2017–2020	Sweden U21	19	(0)
2018–2020	Sweden	2	(0)
- * Club domestic league appearances and goals as of 23 July 2026

Pontus Jacob Ragne Dahlberg (born 21 January 1999) is a Swedish footballer who plays as a goalkeeper for Eliteserien club Lillestrøm.

== Club career ==
On 31 January 2018, Dahlberg signed for Watford on a five-and-a-half-year deal for an undisclosed fee. He was loaned back to IFK Göteborg until the end of the 2017–18 season.

On 6 August 2021, Dahlberg joined League One side Doncaster Rovers on a season-long loan deal. On 14 January 2022, Dahlberg was recalled from his loan spell at Doncaster Rovers after making 18 appearances for the club. Later that day, he joined fellow League One club Gillingham on loan for the rest of the season.

== International ==
He made his debut for Sweden men's national football team on 7 January 2018 in a friendly 1–1 draw with Estonia.

== Career statistics ==
=== Club ===
As of 30 April 2022

Club	Season	League			National Cup		League Cup		Continental		Other		Total	
Club	Season	Division	Apps	Goals	Apps	Goals	Apps	Goals	Apps	Goals	Apps	Goals	Apps	Goals
Älvängens IK	2013	Division 6D Göteborg	21	0	—		—		—		—		21	0
Älvängens IK	2014	Division 6D Göteborg	12	0	—		—		—		—		12	0
Älvängens IK	Total		33	0	0	0	0	0	0	0	0	0	33	0
IFK Göteborg	2017	Allsvenskan	29	0	3	0	—		1	0	—		33	0
IFK Göteborg	2018	Allsvenskan	10	0	4	0	—		0	0	—		14	0
IFK Göteborg	Total		39	0	7	0	0	0	1	0	0	0	47	0
BK Häcken (loan)	2020	Allsvenskan	14	0	0	0	—		0	0	—		14	0
BK Häcken (loan)	2021	Allsvenskan	8	0	4	0	—		0	0	—		12	0
BK Häcken (loan)	Total		22	0	4	0	0	0	0	0	0	0	26	0
Doncaster Rovers (loan)	2021–22	League One	18	0	1	0	1	0	—		0	0	20	0
Gillingham (loan)	2021–22	League One	6	0	0	0	0	0	—		0	0	6	0
Career total			118	0	12	0	1	0	1	0	0	0	132	0

=== International ===
Appearances and goals by national team and year
National team	Year	Apps	Goals
Sweden	2018	1	0
Sweden	2019	0	0
Sweden	2020	1	0
Total		2	0

== Honours ==
Individual

- Allsvenskan Newcomer of the year: 2017
