= Surte Church =

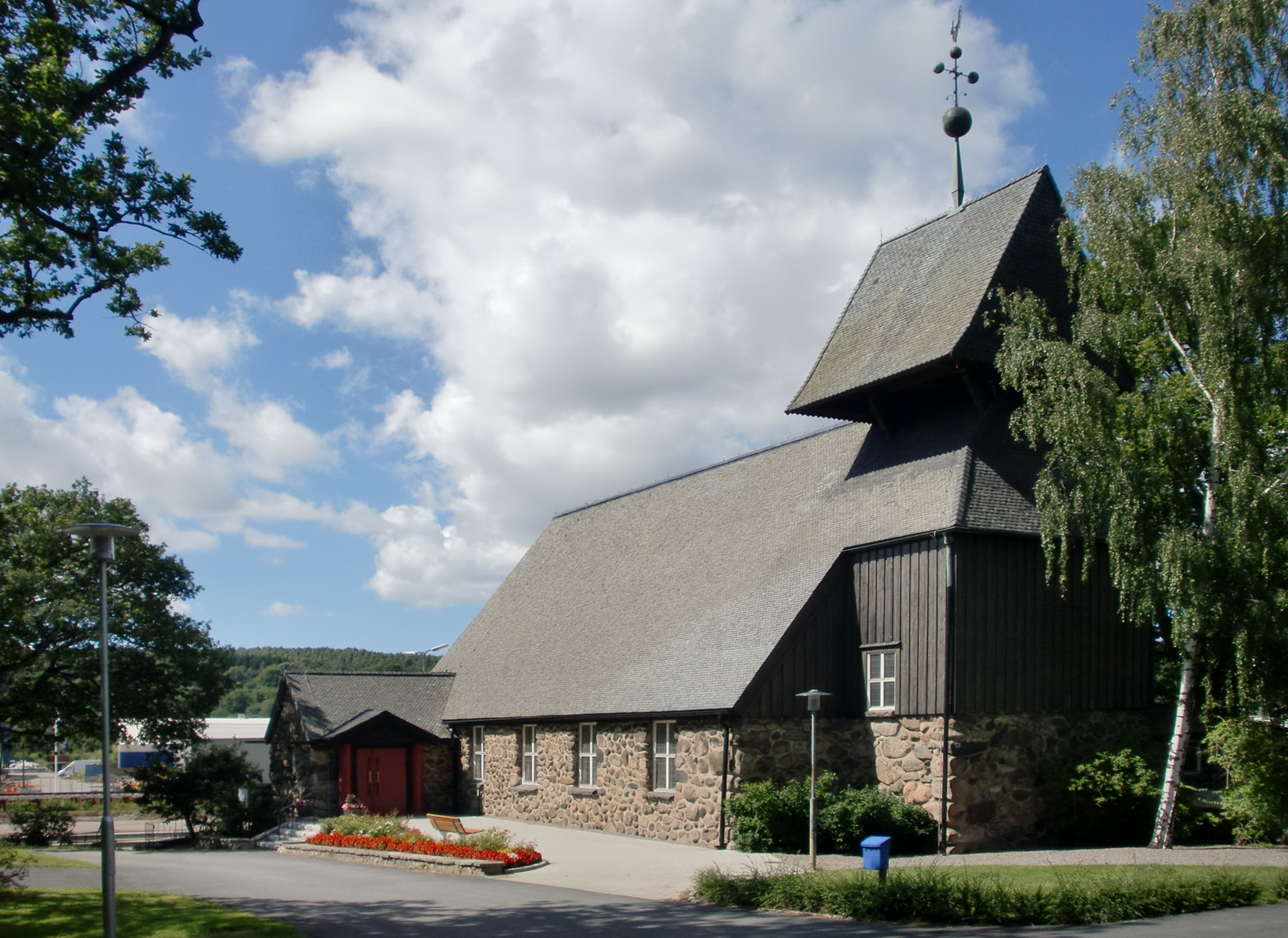
- Surte Church in July 2010

- Location of Surte Church in Västra Götaland County
- 57°49′57.14″N 12°0′50.67″E
- Location: Surte, Västra Götaland County
- Country: Sweden
- Denomination: Church of Sweden
- Website: Nödinge parish

History
- Consecrated: 1912

Surte Church (Swedish: Surte kyrka) is a church in Surte about 10 km (6.2 mi) north of Gothenburg, Sweden. It is part of Nödinge parish in the Diocese of Gothenburg.

== History and architecture ==
Suggestions for the church were made during the late part of the 1890s when the expansion of the Surte glass works drew more and more people to the town. The nearest church was the Nödinge Church, 7.5 km (4.7 mi) from Surte and suggestions were made to build a new church near Jordfallet, a part of the town. The glass works helped with planning the new church and donated a lot for it in 1911.

The church's special feature is the façade and base set with round, naturally polished, stones, which makes the church look older than it is. The stones have been collected from the fields of the Skårdals farmers. The stones were moved to the building site in a total of 740 horse cart loads. The roof is made of slate.

The church was designed by architect Sigfrid Ericson and the project was financed by a voluntary collection that raised SEK 25,000. On the first Sunday of advent in 1912, the church was consecrated and declared open to the congregation. The church is one of the county's most noted examples of the national romanticism architecture of the early 20th century and it is a listed building.
