= Endre Nemes =

Hungarian-Slovako-Czecho-Swedish Surrealist artist

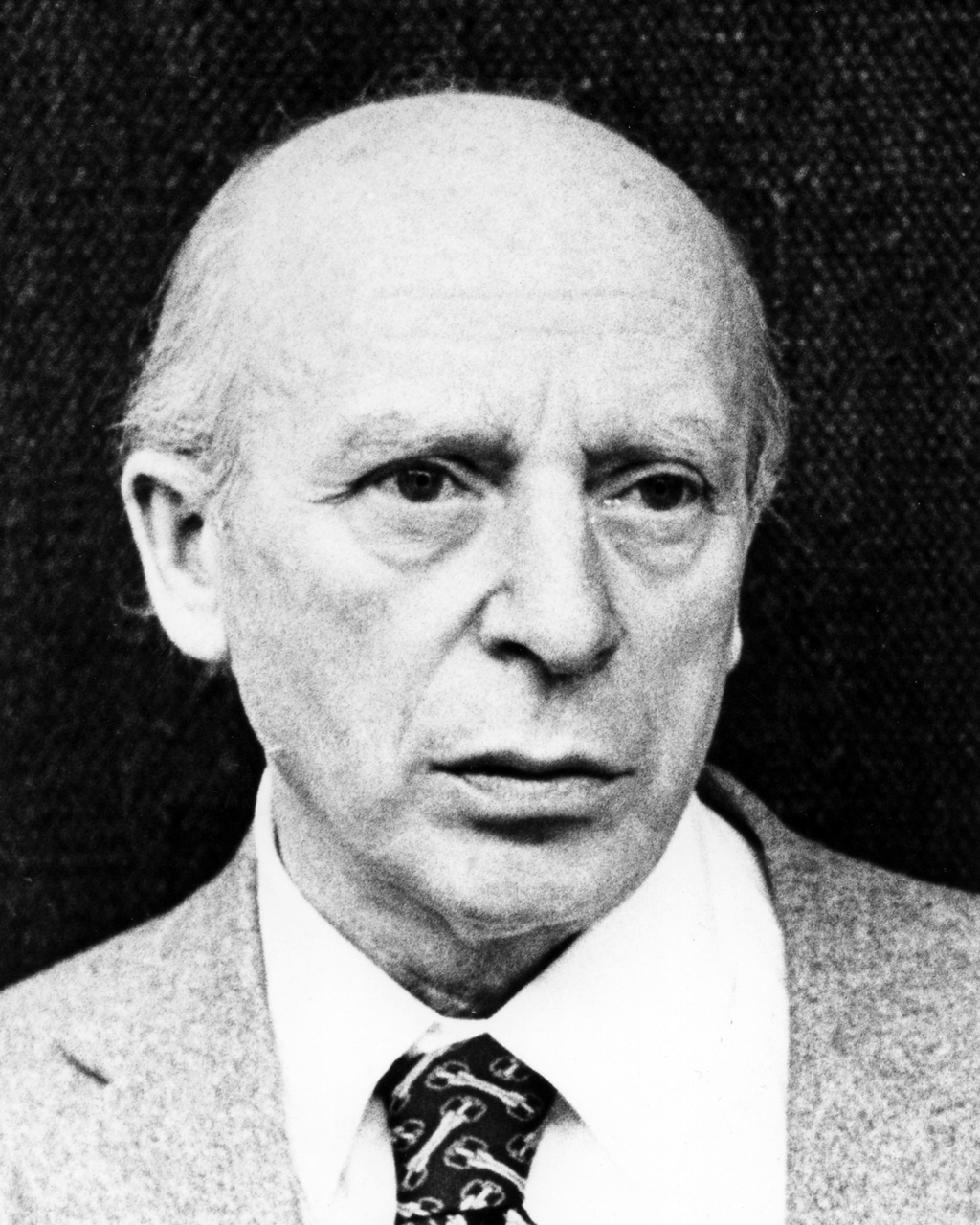
Endre Nemes (photo B L Nemes)

Endre Nemes (November 10, 1909 – September 22, 1985; born with the family name Nágel) was a Hungarian-Slovako-Czecho-Swedish Surrealist artist who had a background in Lyrical Abstraction. While his early exhibitions included tailors' dummies and écorchés, he was notable in Sweden for his use of enamels in public art.

== Biography ==
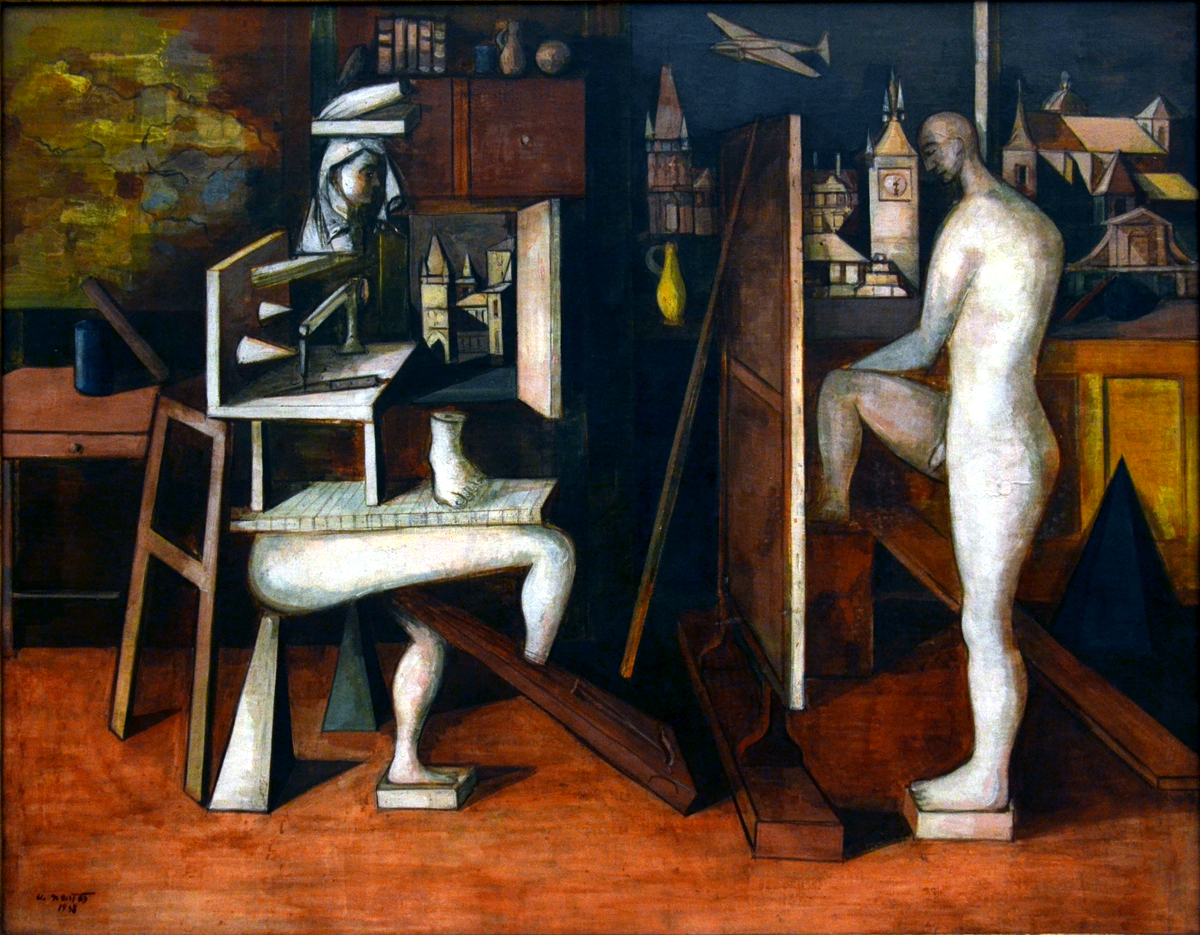
Endre Nemes, Painter in studio, 1938, NG Prague

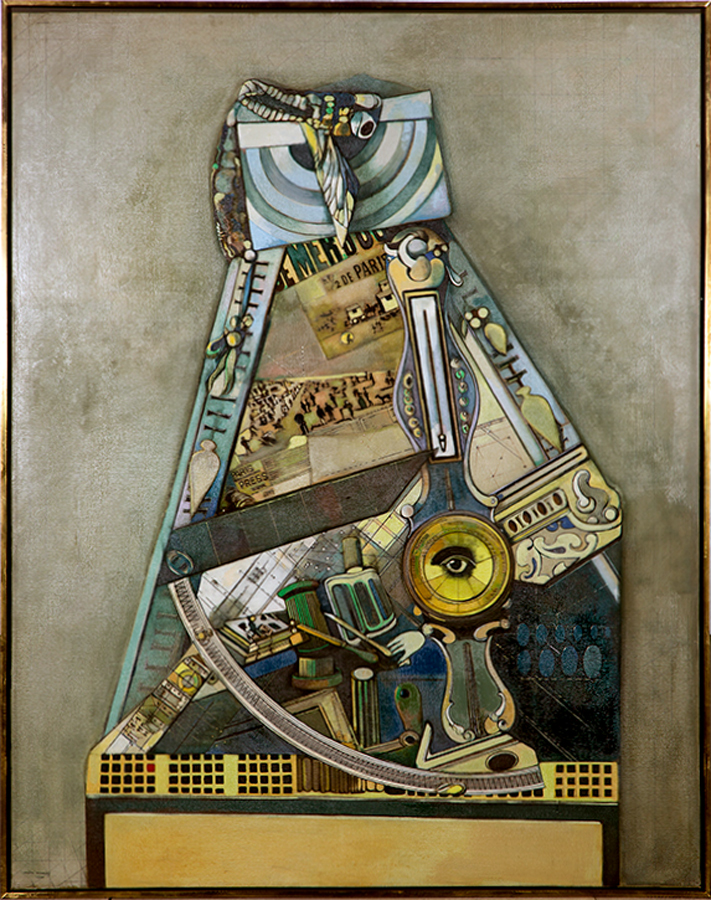
Endre Nemes, Postcard from Deauville, 1970-1977

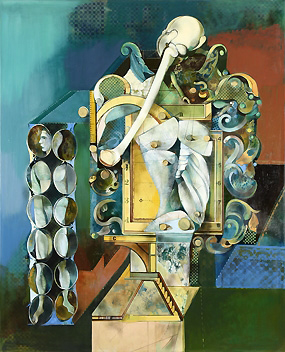
Endre Nemes, Encounter with the Baroque, 1968-1979

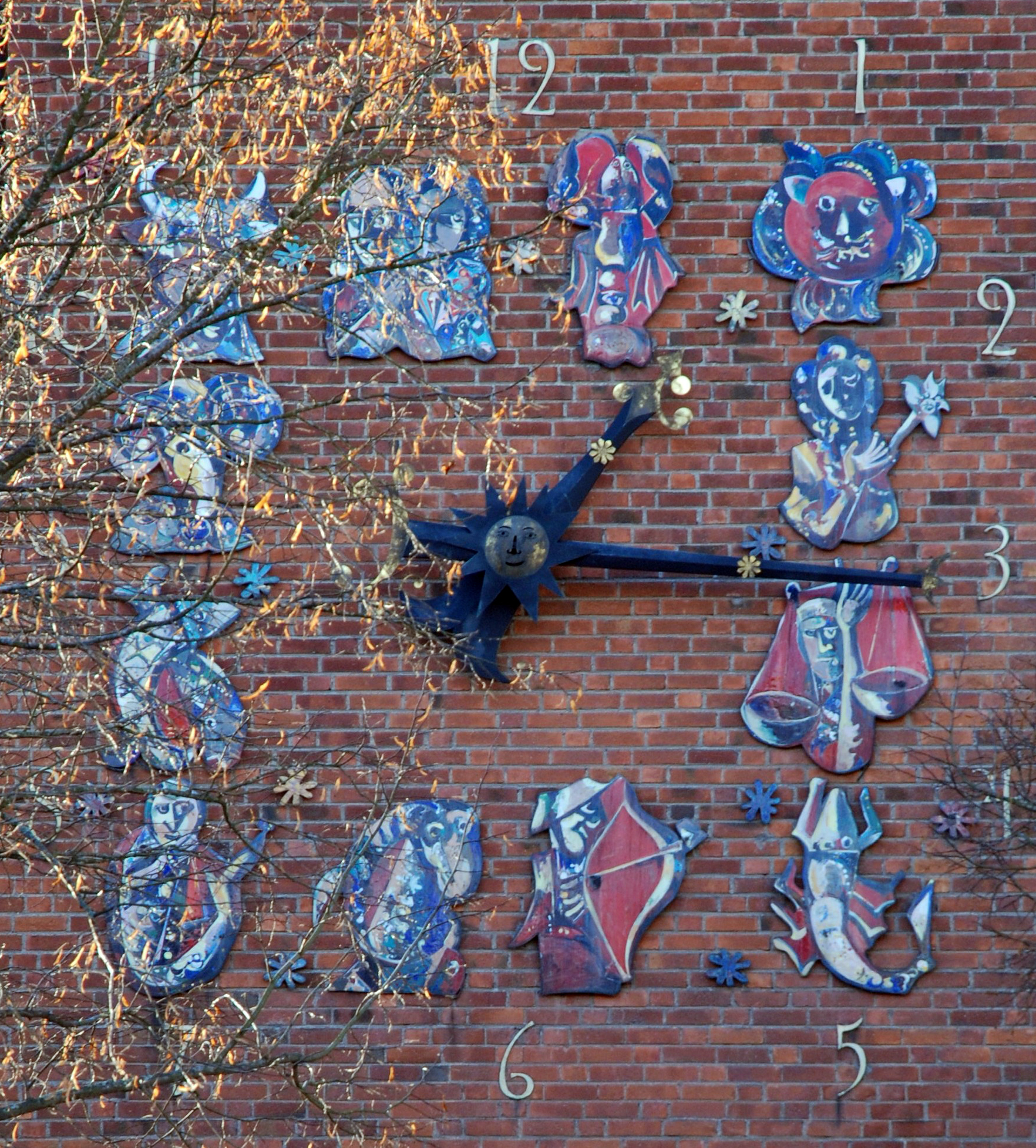
Endre Nemes: Zodiak Clock (1950), enamel, Västertorp

Born Endre Nágel in Pécsvárad, Hungary, in 1909, he changed his name to Nemes in 1928. His family soon moved to the small town of Igló (then part of Austro-Hungarian monarchy, later Czechoslovakia, now Slovakia). He later lived in Vienna (1927) where he studied philosophy before returning to Slovakia, working as a journalist and publishing poetry. In 1930, he moved to Prague where he became a cartoonist. Whilst in Prague, he studied at the Prague Art Academy, where he met Peter Weiss and Bernard Reder and collaborated with Jakub Bauernfreund. Nemes held his first exhibition with Jakub Bauernfreund at the Dr. Feigl Gallery. As a Jew, he escaped from Czechoslovakia before World War II, was in Helsinki in 1938, traveled through Finland and Norway, and ended up in Sweden where he held his first solo exhibition in 1941 in Stockholm. Just prior to Weiss's March 1941 exhibition at Masshallen, Brunkebergsplate, Nemes had shown his work at the same venue.

He became a Swedish citizen in 1948. From 1947 to 1955, he was director and innovator for Valand School of Fine Arts in Gothenburg. He also worked on sets and costumes for the opera house and the municipal theatre. His fanciful paintings often included harlequins and clocks. Nemes became known for several large public art works and was a pioneer in Sweden in the use of enamels in public art, designing the façade of the municipal administration building in Alafors and the Zodiak Clock in the center of Västertorp. Along with Max Walter Svanberg, C.O. Hultén, Adja Yunkers, and Carl O. Svensson, Nemes was a founder of the Minotaur group. In the end of the 1950s, he showed in Zurich and Freiburg, and there was a subsequent retrospective in Lund, Prague, and Salzburg.

In 1965, he was awarded a Swedish State stipend and held a notable exhibition at the Drian Galleries in London. His work can be found in the Museum of Modern Art in Stockholm, Philadelphia Museum of Art and Brooklyn Museum in the US, the Slovak National Gallery in Bratislava, and the Ferenc Martyn Museum in Pécs. In 1980, Nemes was awarded the Prince Eugen Medal and in 1984 received an honorary doctorate from the University of Gothenburg. The same year the three large tapestries he designed for Första Sparbanken in Stockholm were completed at Jindřichův Hradec in Czechoslovakia under the direction of Josef Müller. Two more, for Volvo's headquarters in Gothenburg, followed in 1985. Härryda Municipality in particular has a large collection of works by Nemes. About twenty of his drawings were reported stolen in December 2008 from Ystad Art Museum. However, a month later, the drawings were found in the museum basement. Nemes was a friend of the Estonian poet and publicist Ilmar Laaban.

Nemes died on September 22, 1985, in Stockholm.

== Bibliography ==
- J. Kotalik: Endre Nemes, Opus Int., ix (1968)
- R. v. Holten: Un Kafka de la peinture: Endre Nemes, L’Oeil, 8–9 (1973), pp. 217–18
- Endre Nemes (exhibition catalogue by L. Németh, P. Weiss and E. Nemes, Budapest, N.G., 1982)
- T. Millroth: Endre Nemes, Stockholm, 1985
- F. Romvary and others: Endre Nemes Muzeum, catalogue, Pécs, 1985
- Ivan Jančár: Endre Nemes Visual Poems, catalogue, Galéria Nedbalka, n.o. 2013 ISBN 978-80-971269-2-6
