= Alvhem =

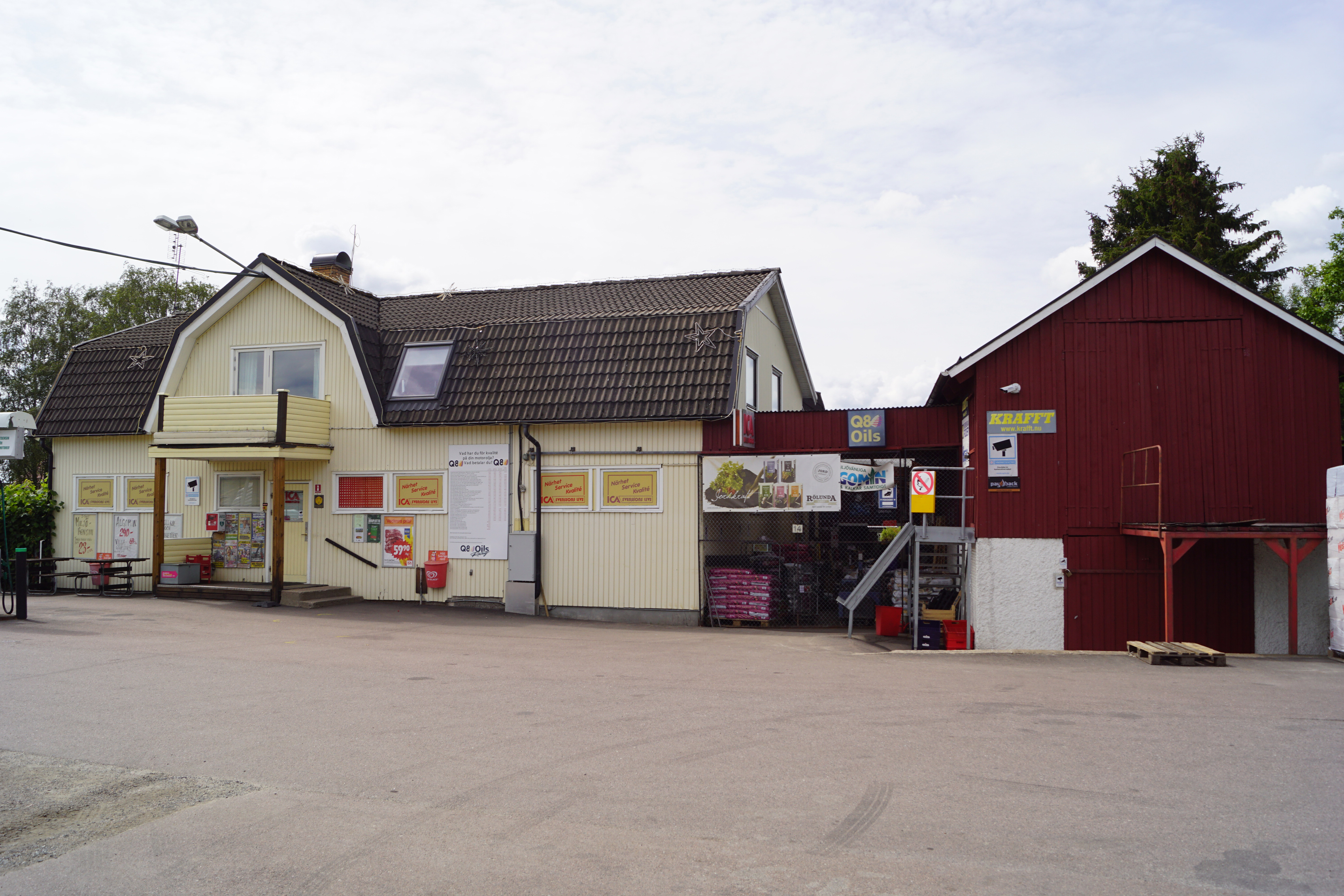
- General Store in Alvhem

- Location within Västra Götaland Location within Sweden
- Coordinates: 58°00′N 12°09′E
- Country: Sweden
- Province: Västergötland
- County: Västra Götaland County
- Municipality: Ale Municipality

Area
  - Total: 0.21 km^{2} (0.081 sq mi)

Population (31 December 2010)
  - Total: 202
  - Density: 983/km^{2} (2,550/sq mi)
- Time zone: UTC+1 (CET)
  - Summer (DST): UTC+2 (CEST)

Alvhem is a locality situated in Ale Municipality, Västra Götaland County, Sweden. It had 202 inhabitants in 2010.
