= Gösta Kriland =

Swedish surrealist artist and book illustrator

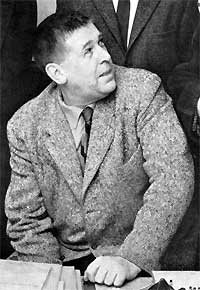
Gösta Kriland about 1960

Gösta Axel Kriland (June 13, 1917 in Valbo, Gästrikland – December 11, 1989 in Stockholm) was a Swedish surrealist book illustrator and painter.

== Life ==
Kriland emerged in the 1940s with paintings that were heavily influenced by surrealist ideas after formative stays in Paris and London during the interwar period. During the 1940s, he joined the Skåne-based painting group imaginisterna. Later, he was active primarily as an illustrator of, among other things, around 50 books.

Kriland is represented at the National Museum and the Modern Museum in Stockholm.
