= Max Walter Svanberg =

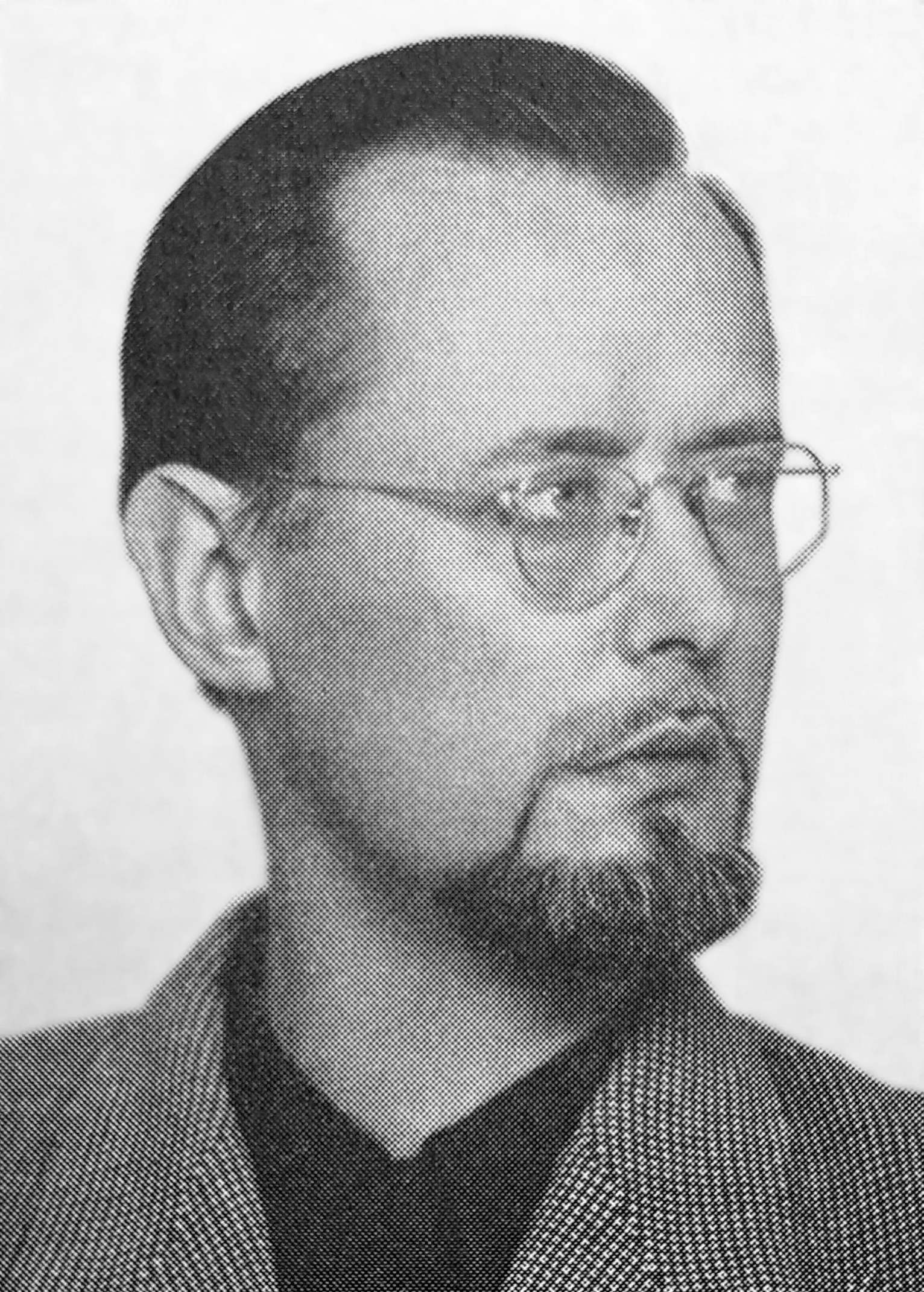
Max Walter Svanberg.

Max Walter Svanberg (February 21, 1912 – May 28, 1994) was a Swedish surrealist painter, illustrator, and designer. His most prevalent motifs were of women's bodies merged with elements of flora and fauna.

Born in Malmö, Sweden, Svanberg founded the Swedish artist group Imaginisterna in 1948, but left them soon after. In 1950, he published an album of lithographs. In 1953, he was invited to join a surrealist group in Paris led by André Breton. Svanberg exhibited at the Galerie de l’Etoile Scellee in 1955. In 1958, he illustrated an edition of Arthur Rimbaud’s Illuminations.

He was awarded the Prince Eugen Medal for painting in 1965.

Svanberg died in Limhamn, Sweden.
