= List of The High Chaparral episodes =

This is a list of episodes for The High Chaparral, a Western television series which aired on NBC from 1967 to 1971. This series consists of 98 one-hour episodes over four seasons.

== Series overview ==
Season	Episodes	Originally released	
Season	Episodes	First released	Last released
1	28	September 10, 1967	March 31, 1968
2	26	September 20, 1968	April 4, 1969
3	26	September 19, 1969	May 5, 1970
4	18	September 18, 1970	March 12, 1971

== Episodes ==
=== Season 1 (1967–1968) ===
No. overall	No. in season	Title	Directed by	Written by	Original release date
1	1	"Destination Tucson"	William F. Claxton	Story by : David Dortort & Denne Bart Petitclerc; Teleplay by : Denne Bart Petitclerc	September 10, 1967
2	2	"The Arrangement"	William F. Claxton	Story by : David Dortort & Denne Bart Petitclerc; Teleplay by : Denne Bart Petitclerc	September 10, 1967
The series premiere originally aired as a two-hour TV movie, and was set in the Arizona Territory of America in the 1870s. In part one, Big John Cannon buys Rancho Rivera in Apache country outside the town of Tucson. With his family, he builds a cattle ranch, which is renamed 'The High Chaparral' by his wife Annalee. But he underestimates the danger from the Apaches, and Annalee is killed in an Indian attack. In part two, Big John forms an alliance with his Mexican neighbour, Don Sebastian Montoya, to combine their resources against the Apaches. This arrangement is sealed by the marriage of Big John to Montoya's daughter, Victoria.
3	3	"The Ghost of Chaparral"	Leon Benson	Gabrielle Upton	September 17, 1967
The marriage of convenience gets off to a shaky start when Big John is haunted by memories of his dead wife, which prevent him becoming close to Victoria. Blue-boy is also haunted by memories of his dead mother, and swears that Victoria will never take her place.
4	4	"Best Man for the Job"	William F. Claxton	Richard Carr	September 24, 1967
When the Army arrive at the ranch with Apache prisoners, John fears his treaty with Cochise will be broken unless they are released; and Blue becomes the best man to keep the peace.
5	5	"A Quiet Day in Tucson"	William F. Claxton	Ken Pettus	October 1, 1967
Buck, Manolito and Blue, disarmed by a Scottish woman neighbour, arrive in Tucson to buy supplies -- and chaos rapidly ensues, as they take to fighting, gambling, and womanizing.
6	6	"Young Blood"	William F. Claxton	Denne Bart Petticlerc	October 8, 1967
When Buck breaks his leg, John entrusts Blue and Manolito - despite their youth and inexperience - to negotiate the purchase of a bull and cows from Don Sebastian Montoya.
7	7	"Shadows on the Land"	William F. Claxton	Ken Pettus	October 15, 1967
A range war comes to the Chaparral when the local ranchers are terrorised by a ruthless cattleman named Tanner, who is forcing them to sell him their stock for next to nothing. Big John finds himself at a disadvantage even though he controls the water, as Tanner has allies among the Apache who he is arming with the latest Spencer repeating rifles. Still haunted by memories of Annalee, John does not appreciate Victoria's interference on behalf of the Mexican ranchers.
8	8	"The Filibusteros"	Allen Reiser	Pat Fiedler	October 22, 1967
Buck accompanies Victoria and Manolito to Don Sebestian's ranchero, but finds it under new ownership, having been seized by a force of ex-Confederate soldiers (filibusteros) led by Buck's former commanding officer, Jake Lanier, who, having lost the Civil War, is intent on carving out a new country on the Mexican side of the border, while the Government there is in chaos following the war of the French intervention.
9	9	"The Doctor from Dodge"	Richard Benedict	Richard Sale	October 29, 1967
The Cannons meet a travelling Dentist, Doc Holliday, who is as skilled with a firearm as with a tooth extractor. Blue's value to John interests Holliday and two outlaws, Kid Curry and Jacques Dubois. The three form a pact, and kidnap Blue to hold for $10,000 ransom.
10	10	"Sudden Country"	Richard Sale	Ken Pettus (as Steven Thornley)	November 5, 1967
Buck, Manolito and Blue help a naive bank clerk and his wife, who have bought a neighboring ranch, come to terms with the harsh realities of the Apache, cheating cattle sellers, and disease; and end his unrealistic dream of becoming a rancher.
11	11	"A Hanging Offense"	Leon Benson	Mel Goldberg	November 12, 1967
Blue accidentally kills a cavalry Lieutenant, the son of a General, who was attacking an Apache girl belonging to Cochise. The General is determined to see Blue hang, and orders a military court martial. Buck and Manolito bargain with Cochise for the Indian girl to testify on Blue's behalf.
12	12	"The Price of Revenge"	Leonard Horn	Frank Chase	November 19, 1967
Mrs Layton, the widow of the previous owner of the High Chaparral, blames the Montoyas for her situation. With the help of gunslinger Tracy Conlin, who is an old friend of Buck's, she determines to drive out the Cannons and reclaim the ranch - whatever the cost.
13	13	"The Widow from Red Rock"	Robert Sparr & William F. Claxton	Michael Fessier	November 26, 1967
Melanie Cawthorne, a widow of the owner of the adjacent Red Rock ranch, manipulates the love-struck Buck into a conflict with John over water rights and over her dealings with Romero, a comanchero who was betrayed by her late husband.
14	14	"Mark of the Turtle"	William F. Claxton	Richard & Esther Shapiro	December 10, 1967
Deputy Marshal Virgil Shanks enlists the High Chaparral's ranch hands as a posse to ride into Montoya's land to capture bandit leader El Lobo and his band, a mission which could break the treaty between the Cannons and Montoyas. Manolito finds El Lobo on his father's land, and attempts to move the bandits out before the posse moves in.
15	15	"The Terrorist"	Ralph Senensky	William F. Leicester	December 17, 1967
During the French intervention in Mexico, Manolito frees his old friend Santos from jail, where he has been imprisoned by the French as a terrorist. Taking Santos to the High Chaparral to meet the future Mexican President, Juarez, Manolito learns that Santos plans to kill Juarez and claim the presidency of Mexico for himself.
16	16	"The Firing Wall"	William Witney	Story by : Thomas Thompson & Richard Sale; Teleplay by : Thomas Thompson	December 31, 1967
A Mexican bandit changes sides in order to head the Rurales, and plans a revolution, luring Chaparral ranch hands, including Blue and Manolito, into Mexico. To prove his power, they are arrested on false charges, to be executed by firing squad - a fate which will also include Don Sebastian when he arrives to bargain for his son's release.
17	17	"The Assassins"	Justus Addiss	Ward Hawkins	January 7, 1968
The Apache medicine man, Nock-Ay-Del, arrives at the High Chaparral to negotiate a peace treaty on behalf of Cochise. He is followed by sub-chief Soldado and two warriors, who are intent on killing Nock-Ay-Del and blaming it on the Cannons, thereby starting a new Indian war.
18	18	"Survival"	William Witney	Frances Cockrell	January 14, 1968
In the desert, scouting a trail to take his cattle to market, Blue wounds a lone Apache who escapes, but he and John are captured by a group of Apache led by Soldado. Remembering their previous encounter, Soldado spares their lives but leaves them to fend for themselves, without horses, water, guns, or hats. After they track down the wounded Apache, an unlikely alliance forms as they seek mutual survival, until the Apache escapes. Then Soldado recaptures John and Blue.
19	19	"Gold Is Where You Leave It"	Paul Stanley	Richard Sale	January 21, 1968
Buck misreads Victoria's intentions when they are thrown together in a life-threatening situation, trapped with Sam by hostile miners at a worked-out goldmine, and then at the High Chaparral, when, with the ranch hands away, they are attacked by Indians.
20	20	"The Kinsman"	Seymour Robbie	Richard Carr	January 28, 1968
The brother of John's first wife, Annalee, arrives at the High Chaparral wounded, and makes an impression on Blue to Buck's displeasure. Not realizing he is a fugitive and a killer, wanted dead or alive for murder and on the run from a pair of bounty hunters, Victoria nurses him back to health. But his true nature is revealed when she is alone with him and unprotected.
21	21	"Champion of the Western World"	William F. Claxton	Michael Fessier	February 4, 1968
During 4th of July celebrations in Tucson, a $300 saddle Blue wants leads to chaos as the Chaparral ranch hands compete in various competitions to raise the money, culminating in a prize fight between Blue and the Champion of the Western World. Victoria, caught up in the excitement, ends up with a black eye but saves the day.
22	22	"Ride the Savage Land"	Richard Benedict	Tim Kelly	February 11, 1968
Buck and Manolito rescue one of two young white girls held as Apache slaves. John asks a passing Army detachment for aid, but the Officer refuses. Buck and Manolito prepare to buy the girl's freedom, but find the detachment massacred and are themselves captured. The Apache chief and the medicine man, who remember Victoria helping Nock-Ay-Del, offer to let them go free if Manolito can survive a test of courage.
23	23	"Bad Day for a Thirst"	William F. Claxton	Tim Kelly	February 18, 1968
Buck takes a pair of young Apache drifters under his wing, engaging them as new ranch hands. But when a local rancher is murdered by Apache raiders, the pair are suspected of the killing when they are taken away by the war party. John, Buck and the ranch hands pursue them to an isolated Army fort in the desert.
24	24	"Tiger by the Tail"	Seymour Robbie	Mel Goldberg	February 25, 1968
Blue and Joe bring a wounded El Tigre ('the Tiger'), a notorious bandit on both sides of the border, to the High Chaparral. John has to convince his men to hold the outlaw for trial in Tucson. El Tigre's brother, Rafael, attacks the ranch, and Victoria, sickened by the bloodshed, frees El Tigre when he promises to leave peacefully, but he shows his true colours by taking John captive.
25	25	"The Peacemaker"	Richard Benedict	John Starr Niendorff	March 3, 1968
Blue walks out after a quarrel with his father, and comes across a peace envoy, with his adopted Apache daughter, Moonfire, on a mission to Cochise from the President. As the price of peace, Cochise demands a strip of land that cuts off the High Chaparral from Tucson, knowing John could never agree to it. Blue falls in love with Moonfire, and they return to the High Chaparral with Cochise's demand.
26	26	"The Hair Hunter"	Robert Gist	Ken Pettus	March 10, 1968
Apache raids close Judah Austin's mine, so he offers Stoner $100 bounty for Indian scalps despite John Cannon's objections. Stoner's son, Chad, is wounded in an attack on the Apaches, and turns against his father whilst recovering at the High Chaparral. Sub-Chief Soldado traps John, Blue, Stoner and Chad in the open, and demands Stoner be handed over.
27	27	"A Joyful Noise"	Richard Benedict	William Blinn	March 24, 1968
Manolito meets the beautiful Maria, accompanied by a priest and two nuns, who are intent on building a convent to replace the Mexican convent plundered by Maria's demented fiancé, Ramon. Manolito falls in love with Maria, and a confrontation ensues with Ramon. Maria must choose between the two men, or take holy orders with the Church.
28	28	"Threshold of Courage"	William F. Claxton	William F. Leicester	March 31, 1968
Victoria is kidnapped by bandits led by Captain Finlay Carr, a former Confederate officer, and his reluctant brother Stacey, who are seeking revenge on Big John. Carr is embittered by the final days of the civil war, when Union Army Captain John Cannon left him without a hand at the Battle of Five Forks, Petersburg.

=== Season 2 (1968–1969) ===
No. overall	No. in season	Title	Directed by	Written by	Original release date
29	1	"The Stallion"	William Witney	Ken Pettus	September 20, 1968
Blue and the Apache Chief's son, Chatto, both try to catch a wild black stallion. Blue captures the horse but Chatto steals it and a feud begins. The two boys meet and fight, while the High Chaparral wranglers and Apache braves watch, as the two fathers arrive in an attempt to resolve the situation and prevent the peace treaty breaking down.
30	2	"Ten Little Indians"	William F. Claxton	Warren Douglas	September 27, 1968
Buck and Blue find two young Apache orphans in the desert, including the grandson of Geronimo. The two children become four, and soon there are ten little Indians at the High Chaparral. Geronimo and his braves come for them, but the children mistake them for hostile Pimas and hide in the desert. The Apaches threaten revenge if the children are not returned. Meanwhile the Pimas lurk nearby, hunting for them.
31	3	"Follow Your Heart"	William F. Claxton	Gene McCarr	October 4, 1968
A letter from Sam Butler's home town tells of his daughter's death at the hands of the son of his and Joe's adopted father. Sam (Don Collier), shunning his friends, walks out of the ranch alone to seek his estranged wife and take revenge. John, Buck, Manolito - and most of the ranchhands - secretly follow, to help in the inevitable confrontation.
32	4	"Tornado Frances"	Joseph Pevney	Charles Lang	October 11, 1968
Buck is tricked into buying a saloon wrecked by a so-called "tornado", not knowing the damage is actually due to a temperance group led by the spirited Frances O'Toole, who became enraged on finding her fiancé, Warren, drunk there. Chaos follows Buck's attempt to reopen the saloon when he employs Warren as the new barkeeper.
33	5	"The Covey"	William F. Claxton	Alex Sharp	October 18, 1968
Escorting a mule train from Tucson, carrying supplies for the High Chaparral, Uncle Buck, together with Manolito, Blue and the ranch hands, find themselves trapped in a box canyon by El Lobo's bandits, who have information that they are low on ammunition.
34	6	"The Promised Land"	Joseph Pevney	Ken Pettus	October 25, 1968
Don Sebastian goes back on his promise to sell a small village on his land to his tenants, after Vaquero has obtained the purchase money from a dying friend: money that may have been stolen by a bandit.
35	7	"Ebenezer"	Harry Harris	James L. Henderson	November 1, 1968
In an attempt to break the lawlessness in Tucson, John persuades crusading editor Ebenezer Binns to set up a weekly newspaper. In the face of opposition from an outlaw named Hank Pogue and his gunmen, John provides Binns with protection.
36	8	"North to Tucson"	Harry Harris	D.C. Fontana	November 8, 1968
The stage to Tucson is ambushed in the desert by Comancheros. Victoria and James Forrest, left for dead, are the only survivors. As they trek through the desert, Victoria learns that Forrest is intent on killing her husband. But as John and Manolito search for Victoria, she and Forrest are captured by the Comancheros for ransom.
37	9	"The Deceivers"	William Witney	John Starr Niendorff	November 15, 1968
Chio, an Apache half-breed, who has been plundering High Chaparral supply wagons, is captured and brought to the ranch. Meanwhile, Manolito discovers Tina Granger near a burned out stagecoach in an apparently unrelated incident, and brings her back to the Chaparral, not realizing she is Chio's daughter.
38	10	"The Buffalo Soldiers"	Joseph Pevney	Walter Black	November 22, 1968
The citizens of Tucson petition the Territorial Governor for martial law, to break the grip of corrupt town boss Hilliard, but to their dismay are sent a Negro regiment. The Buffalo Soldiers realize the Cannons will be their only support when they go up against Hilliard's hired gunslingers.
39	11	"For What We Are About to Receive"	William F. Claxton	Michael Fessier	November 29, 1968
Chaos erupts when Victoria wants a Turkey for Thanksgiving. Manolito wins one that is then stolen; and whilst John is trying to buy one from his squatter neighbour, Fergus McLeish, Apaches steal it. Victoria ends up with more guests for dinner than she expects.
40	12	"A Way of Justice"	Joseph Pevney	Story by : Warren Garfield & Alan L. Honaker & B.W. Sandefur; Teleplay by : B.W. Sandefur	December 13, 1968
Headed for Tucson, to reclaim the loot from a robbery, escaped convicts Mitch, Cable and Kolos kill a girl and bushwack Big John, stealing his clothes and leaving him in prison garb. While Buck, Manolito and Blue search for him, John is mistaken for the killer and captured by the girl's family, who want revenge and plan a lynching.
41	13	"Our Lady of Guadalupe"	Harry Harris	B.W. Sandefur	December 20, 1968
A local priest (Ricardo Montalbán) raises funds to support an impoverished Mexican town by providing a counterfeit religious relic, a statue of a Saint known as Our Lady of Guadelupe, to attract pilgrims to the town. It also attracts thieves, who believe it is priceless.
42	14	"Sea of Enemies"	Robert L. Friend	Story by : Christopher Helms; Teleplay by : Walter Black	January 3, 1969
A mentally ill black deserter from the U.S. Cavalry, on the run for murdering his commanding officer, is befriended by Blue. He takes Blue hostage to lead him out of the desert. They are pursued by John, Buck and four cavalrymen into forbidden Apache country.
43	15	"Shadow of the Wind"	Joseph Pevney	Warren Douglas	January 10, 1969
A fiesta celebrating a peace treaty with the Apaches is interrupted by the arrival of a gang of outlaws posing as lawmen, who are really scalp hunters, murdering Indians for the bounty paid for their scalps, and whose activities threaten to provoke a new Indian War.
44	16	"No Irish Need Apply"	Harry Harris	William F. Leicester	January 17, 1969
Against Big John's wishes, Manolito helps an Irish miner named McLaren (John Vernon) who is leading a strike against dangerous working conditions in the local mines, but when one miner is killed McLaren secretly plots to use sabotage to destroy the mine.
45	17	"The Last Hundred Miles"	Joseph Pevney	Al C. Ward	January 24, 1969
A freight-shipping agent, Lucien Charot, fakes Indian attacks as a pretext for increasing the prices of the goods he brings into Tucson, and has ambitious plans to reinstate a French empire in Mexico. John supports a rival freight line in the face of intimidation from Charot.
46	18	"The Glory Soldiers"	Harry Harris	Warren Douglas	January 31, 1969
A troupe of religious revivalists from the Salvation Army, passing through the Territory en route to Tombstone, Arizona, enlist the help of Buck and Manolito as guides. Trouble follows the group in the shape of the bandit El Lobo, the Apaches, and a squad of Mexican Rurales looking to arrest Manolito.
47	19	"Feather of an Eagle"	Harry Harris	Unknown	February 7, 1969
Blue is taken hostage by the Apaches, when he frees a white girl from their captivity against Buck's advice. The girl is considered by the Apache leader Santos to be his wife. Buck, to avoid bloodshed, agrees to exchange her for Blue.
48	20	"Once on a Day in Spring"	Joseph Pevney	Don Carpenter	February 14, 1969
Don Sebastian is upset by the unexpected arrival at his hacienda of Victoria, who has walked out on John, whilst he is romancing a beautiful European Countess who he met at an Ambassadors Ball in Mexico City. Don Sebastian is further upset when Manolito, sent as a peacemaker by John, arrives and begins to romance the Countess.
49	21	"Stinky Flanagan"	William F. Claxton	Unknown	February 21, 1969
An Irish trooper, Flanagan (Frank Gorshin), deserts from the US Cavalry to save the life of a camel he is caring for, which the Army is trialing for desert survival missions. Flanagan sells the beast to Buck, convincing him the camel can herd cattle.
50	22	"Surtee"	William F. Claxton	Story by : Tim Kelly; Teleplay by : William F. Leicester	February 28, 1969
A crooked ex-Army officer named Surtee (John Dehner) is appointed as the new Indian Agent for the Reservation closest to the High Chaparral ranch, and sets about arming the Indians and using them to rustle cattle from the local ranchers, threatening the peace treaty.
51	23	"A Fella Named Kilroy"	William F. Claxton	Alex Sharp	March 7, 1969
A bank robber named Kilroy, who is an old friend of Buck, is taken on as a new ranch hand at the High Chaparral, and soon becomes the most popular hand; but he is still being hunted by a trio of dangerous outlaws who he double-crossed after a recent robbery.
52	24	"No Bugles, No Drums"	William F. Claxton	John D.F. Black	March 14, 1969
The love of Buck's life turns up with her young daughter (Pamelyn Ferdin) at the High Chaparral to enlist his help in her search for her missing husband (William Sylvester). Buck is waylaid in his search, but is rescued by her husband, who is reluctant to return to her.
53	25	"The Lion Sleeps"	William F. Claxton	Tim Kelly	March 28, 1969
Don Sebastian, who semi-humorously styles himself 'the Lion of Sonora', is wounded by an assassin. From his death bed, he plays on the sympathy of the Cannons to wrest control of the High Chaparral from Big John, and to arrange a marriage for Manolito to a rich heiress and neighbour, in order to control her estates also. But no one is aware that he has faked all his supposed injuries.
54	26	"For the Love of Carlos"	William F. Claxton	James L. Henderson	April 4, 1969
A Mexican outlaw with a price on his head (Michael Ansara) comes to Tucson looking for his son, Carlos, a young boy who has been unofficially adopted by Victoria, and kidnaps both Victoria and the boy.

=== Season 3 (1969–1970) ===
No. overall	No. in season	Title	Directed by	Written by	Original release date
55	1	"Time of Your Life"	Leon Benson	William F. Leicester	September 19, 1969
After making a cattle delivery to a town with no lawman, Blue-boy is provoked into a feud with a professional gunfighter, who is seeking to establish a reputation better even than that of Billy the Kid, and who has selected Blue as his next victim.
56	2	"A Time to Laugh, a Time to Cry"	Leon Benson	Jon Bennett Reed	September 26, 1969
Manolito becomes involved with an aristocratic young woman whom he knew in childhood, Mercedes Vega de Grenada, who is visiting Rancho Montoya. When she refuses to go through with an arranged marriage to another man, Manolito begins courting her, but is shot by a band of Comancheros who kidnap her for ransom.
57	3	"The Brothers Cannon"	Leon Benson	Raphael Hayes	October 3, 1969
Buck has a disagreement with Big John, and walks out of the High Chaparral, followed by Blue, bringing a full-scale family feud to the fore. Victoria tries to act as peacemaker, but matters get out of hand when Blue becomes lost in the desert.
58	4	"A Piece of Land"	Leon Benson	Jack B. Sowards	October 10, 1969
Buck decides he needs some land of his own. When he accidentally makes a silver strike on the neighbouring Patterson ranch, he goes into partnership with Manolito to buy the ranch -- if they can raise the downpayment of a thousand dollars.
59	5	"Bad Day for a Bad Man"	Robert Friend	Story by : Michael Fessier; Teleplay by : Milton S. Gelman	October 17, 1969
A band of Mexican bandits (led by Malachi Throne), steal a fortune of John's money from Manolito, which John has raised by mortgaging the ranch, that is needed to finance a cattle purchase. While John is away on a false trail pursuing the bandits, they seize the High Chaparral and take Victoria hostage.
60	6	"To Stand for Something More"	James B. Clark	Milton S. Gelman	October 24, 1969
Disaster strikes when Blue is left in charge. In his efforts to assert his new authority, he inadvertently leaves the ranch unmanned, and wide open to attack.
61	7	"Trail to Nevermore"	Virgil W. Vogel	Walter Black	October 31, 1969
John, Victoria and Manolito are attacked in the desert by bandits, whilst en route to Tucson, and John is injured. Now on foot, without food or water, and carrying the injured John, they take shelter from the bandits in a seemingly abandoned ghost town called Nevermore.
62	8	"Apache Trust"	Herschel Daugherty	Story by : Jon Bennett Reed & Robert Warren; Teleplay by : Irve Tunick	November 7, 1969
Blue-boy falls into the hands of the Apaches when a consignment of rifles being transported by the Army is hijacked by bandits disguised as Indians. John tries to negotiate with the Apache leader, Moralles (Chief Dan George), who fears the Army will never believe that his people were not behind the attack. John fears a new Indian war will break out when the Army retaliates.
63	9	"Lady Fair"	Gerry Day	Don Richardson	November 14, 1969
Buck becomes romantically involved with a very pretty woman who is trying to run a freight-line business in Tucson. Nicknamed 'Charley', she's as big a hell-raiser as Buck himself. If she can ship freight faster than her competitors, she can win a contract to supply a nearby town, and Buck enlists the High Chaparral's ranch hands to help her win it.
64	10	"The Lost Ones"	Phil Rawlins	Story by : Thomas Thompson; Teleplay by : David Duncan	November 21, 1969
When Victoria's nursing saves the life of a young Apache warrior named Nemo, the Apache leader (Christopher Dark) believes she has magic powers and forces her to tend his other son, who is far more badly injured and who has no prospects of survival; but Victoria and Manolito are to be murdered by the Apaches if the boy dies. Manolito conceives a means of sending for help, using a most unusual messenger.
65	11	"The Legacy"	Don Richardson	Milton S. Gelman	November 28, 1969
A conman named Gar Burnett (John Dehner) and his attractive daughter target the High Chaparral. After winning an introduction to Big John through the young and gullible Blue-boy, who is smitten with the girl, they swindle John out of $25,000. But when the conman is found dead, Buck is the only possible suspect.
66	12	"Alliance"	Phil Rawlins	Don Balluck	December 12, 1969
The lives of everyone on the High Chaparral are endangered when the Army sends a bounty hunter, Johnny Ringo (Robert Viharo), into the Indian reservation, to kill an Apache wanted for robbery and murder.
67	13	"The Little Thieves"	Phil Rawlins	D.C. Fontana	December 26, 1969
Buck and Manolito capture two young women horse-thieves (Jo Ann Harris and Heather Menzies), one of whom is the daughter of a notorious outlaw (William Sylvester). But when the women are taken in by the family instead of being handed over to the law to hang, they repay the kindness by plotting a jail-break in Tucson.
68	14	"The Long Shadow"	Phil Rawlins	Walter Black	January 2, 1970
A shadow of fear falls over the ranch when a mysterious, unknown foe begins a terror campaign of arson and murder, in revenge for some supposed injustice long ago, culminating in an attack on Big John while the ranch hands and the family are away.
69	15	"The Journal of Death"	Leon Benson	Frank & Ramona Case	January 9, 1970
Victoria is near death, but the only available surgeon, Doc Kendall (John Colicos), who is on the run from the law, has lost his nerve and refuses to perform the only operation that might save her.
70	16	"Friends and Partners"	Leon Benson	Jack B. Sowards	January 16, 1970
Buck and Manolito spend some time away from the Chaparral working the ranch they own together, thinking it will be a rest cure, but spend most of the time arguing and the rest fighting comancheros who are trying to rustle their livestock.
71	17	"Jelks"	Don Richardson	Walter Black	January 23, 1970
With Sam gone, the ranch needs a new foreman. Joe (Bob Hoy) is the popular choice with everyone, until he signs on a new hand named Jelks (Mitchell Ryan), an outlaw on the run from the law in Mexico, who is planning to rob Big John's safe.
72	18	"The Guns of Johnny Rondo"	Phil Rawlins	Gerry Day	February 6, 1970
Sixteen tried and sixteen died, at the hands of Johnny Rondo; Sixteen holes and sixteen souls, from the guns of Johnny Rondo. A new ranch hand (Steve Forrest) is a retired gunslinger, who has sworn off violence and hung up his guns, but who is being hunted by a restless lynch mob - relations of his late victims.
73	19	"Mi Casa, Su Casa"	Don Richardson	Tim Kelly	February 20, 1970
Big John misunderstands the meaning of an old Mexican custom, "my house is your house", and invites Don Sebastian Montoya (Frank Silvera) to make himself at home whilst visiting his children, Victoria and Manolito, at the High Chaparral. Don Sebastian takes the invitation literally --- and provokes an Apache attack.
74	20	"The Lieutenant"	William Wiard	Irve Tunick	February 27, 1970
The son of an old friend (Robert Pine), newly appointed as a Lieutenant in the US Cavalry, arrives at the Chaparral to arrest a neighbouring rancher, Henry Simmons (Donald Moffat), who it is alleged deserted from the Army during the Civil War ten years earlier. But the inexperienced Lieutenant provokes a shootout, in which the Cannons must line up with their neighbour and friend against the Army.
75	21	"The Reluctant Deputy"	Leon Benson	Walter Black	March 6, 1970
A practical joke played on Blue-boy by Buck and Manolito results in his becoming a temporary deputy during the Sheriff's absence, but following a robbery at the Wells Fargo office he takes his revenge by arresting them!
76	22	"New Hostess in Town"	Virgil W. Vogel	Walter Black	March 20, 1970
Travelling to Rancho Montoya, Victoria is captured by outlaws and forced to work for them as a hostess, in the saloon of a broken-down border town. Buck, searching for her, is forced to pose as her husband, in order to protect her from the most dangerous member of the gang (Jim Davis) until they can attempt an escape.
77	23	"Too Many Chiefs"	Virgil W. Vogel	Don Balluck	March 27, 1970
Big John and Victoria finally get to take a honeymoon, and spend three weeks in San Francisco. While they are away, they leave too many chiefs in charge at the High Chaparral, and chaos results. John is secretly pleased to discover that he really is indispensable. Noah Beery guest stars.
78	24	"Auld Lang Syne"	Herschel Daugherty	Walter Black	April 10, 1970
An old friend of Buck's from the Army of the Confederacy (Gregory Walcott) arrives in Tucson, now wearing the uniform of the Yankee Army, and offers Buck a job escorting a gold shipment to Yuma. But Buck is unaware that a robbery is planned, and that he is to be framed for it by his old friend.
79	25	"Generation"	James B. Clark	Story by : Don Balluck; Teleplay by : Don Balluck & Irve Tunick	April 17, 1970
After allowing the Apaches to raid the High Chaperral, by going off day-dreaming while he was supposed to be on guard, Blue-boy is finally reconciled to the fact that he will never make a proper ranch-hand, and accepts an offer to go back East.
80	26	"No Trouble at All"	Phil Rawlins	Jack B. Sowards	May 5, 1970
Victoria says that helping deliver a baby at a neighboring ranch will be no trouble at all; but en route she is kidnapped by Apaches, and while Buck and Manolito are attempting a rescue she falls into the hands of a band of outlaws planning a bank robbery - who decide that for it to succeed they will have to kill her. This episode is Mark Slade's final appearance in the show.

=== Season 4 (1970–1971) ===
No. overall	No. in season	Title	Directed by	Written by	Original release date
81	1	"An Anger Greater Than Mine"	William Wiard	Don Balluck	September 18, 1970
The High Chaparral and Rancho Montoya are both threatened when Victoria's childhood sweetheart, Diego de la Paula, seeks revenge after his hacienda is seized and sold to Don Sebastian Montoya by the new Mexican government, whom de la Paula fought against in the recent civil war. Posthumous appearance by Frank Silvera.
82	2	"Spokes"	William Wiard	Ron Bishop	September 25, 1970
Whilst passing through the town of Spokes, Buck becomes involved in a feud with a local cattle rancher named Pierce (William Conrad), whose son has been killed by a friend of Buck's in a gunfight.
83	3	"Only the Bad Come to Sonora"	Don Richardson	Don Balluck & Gerry Day	October 2, 1970
Manolito escorts his father's prize stallion, for which Big John has paid a large breeding fee, from Rancho Montoya to the High Chaparral, but on the way the horse is stolen. Don Sebastian persuades the elegant Manolito to disguise himself as a filthy peasant, in order to mix with the kind of people who can provide the only clue to the horse's whereabouts. Final appearance by Frank Silvera.
84	4	"Wind"	Phil Rawlins	Clyde Ware	October 9, 1970
A half-Indian boy named 'Wind' (Rudy Ramos), from a friendly Pawnee tribe, is taken on as a new ranch hand at High Chaparral. But many of the local ranchers and cowboys openly resent having a potentially hostile Indian living in their midst, perceiving the boy as being as wild and dangerous as the Apaches.
85	5	"A Matter of Survival"	William Wiard	Frank Chase & Ramona Chase	October 16, 1970
Fifty miles from the ranch, Victoria, Sam and Pedro are attacked by Apaches. Also in the party are a baby and its grandfather. With the Apaches on their heels, they flee into the wilderness; but their horses are worn out, and they have no food for the baby.
86	6	"It Takes a Smart Man"	Leon Benson	Jack B. Sowards	October 23, 1970
A gunfighter named Tulsa Red (Richard Bradford), a natural-born killer and an old enemy of the Cannons, extorts $5,000 from John by threatening to kill Buck. But when Buck hears of it, he sets out to retrieve the money despite the threat, knowing that he is walking into a gunfight in which he stands no chance of survival.
87	7	"A Good Sound Profit"	Corey Allen	George Atkins	October 30, 1970
When John decides to make a substantial profit by selling supplies to Maximillian revolutionaries in Mexico, who no one else in Arizona will deal with, he comes up against hostility from all his neighbours - and even from Buck, Manolito and Victoria. No one agrees with him that it is simply a matter of business, not politics.
88	8	"Too Late the Epitaph"	James Neilson	George Atkins	November 6, 1970
While away handling a cattle sale for Big John, Manolito comes across the loot from a stagecoach robbery. However, in a town where no one knows him, no one will believe he was not one of the robbers, until an old friend arranges his release from jail. Manolito doesn't suspect that his so-called friend intends to frame him for murder.
89	9	"The Forge of Hate"	Don Richardson	Frank Chase	November 13, 1970
As the old Apache chief lies dying, two of the younger braves clash: one wants to kill all white men, while the other, who is to be the new Chief, rides to the Chaparral and offers peace. John has to decide whether he can trust the offer.
90	10	"Fiesta"	John Florea	Michael Fisher	November 20, 1970
On his way to a Fiesta in Mexico, Buck witnesses the unpleasant sport of boy-fighting in a Mexican cantina. Rescuing the losing boy, Buck finds himself in danger from the boy's former owner (Nehemiah Persoff), whose livelihood depends on the fights, who wants the child back.
91	11	"A Matter of Vengeance"	Phil Rawlins	Don Balluck & James Schmerer	November 27, 1970
Dan Casement (Barry Sullivan), formerly a cattleman, is on a trail of vengeance, hunting three men who burned his ranch and murdered his grandson. Now the trail has led him to Tucson, and the High Chaparral.
92	12	"Pale Warrior"	Joseph Pevney	Don Balluck and Peter Dixon & Laird Koenig	December 11, 1970
A young white man, captured in childhood by the Apaches, seeks sanctuary at the High Chaparral. Wind (Rudy Ramos) and the ranch hands don't trust him - even though he claims to hate the Apaches, no one is sure whether he is telling the truth.
93	13	"The Badge"	Arthur H. Nadel	Unknown	December 18, 1970
In a flashback episode set in the immediate aftermath of the Civil War, Buck attempts to prevent some of his former Confederate associates (led by Morgan Woodward) from robbing a bank, in a town where Big John is the Marshal. Because of the war John has not seen Buck for several years, but must now arrest him for a crime he didn't commit.
94	14	"The New Lion of Sonora: Part 1"	Leon Benson	Don Balluck & James Schmerer	February 19, 1971
Following Don Sebastian's death, there is uncertainty as to whether his son, Manolito, will become the new owner of Rancho Montoya, known locally as the "Lion of Sonora", or whether it is to be inherited by Victoria and Manolito's uncle, Don Sebastian's feckless and unreliable brother, Don Domingo (Gilbert Roland). Guest starring Roger C. Carmel and Malachi Throne.
95	15	"The New Lion of Sonora: Part 2"	Leon Benson	Don Balluck & James Schmerer	February 19, 1971
Don Sebastian's brother arrives at Rancho Montoya, but demonstrates little enthusiasm for running the ranch, viewing it instead as a valuable asset to be sold for a quick profit. Big John is suddenly faced with the loss of his alliance with the Montoyas, which is vital to the security of High Chaparral.
96	16	"Sangre"	Phil Rawlins	Jack B. Sowards	February 26, 1971
Buck comes across a wounded Apache in the desert and brings him back as a captive to the ranch, where he learns from a Cavalry detachment that his prisoner is Sangre (Pat Renella), the Apache Chief. The High Chaparral comes under siege from the Apaches, who seek to free their leader by burning it to the ground.
97	17	"The Hostage"	Leon Benson	Gerry Day	March 5, 1971
Victoria is taken hostage during an attempted bank robbery in Tucson, when the Army deposit a money shipment there. In the struggle the only man (Kermit Murdock) with the combination to the safe is knifed; he lies in a coma, but if he dies the fate of the hostages is uncertain.
98	18	"A Man to Match the Land"	Don McDougall	Clyde Ware	March 12, 1971
John and the Apache leader, Red Eagle, exchange their respective brothers as hostages, while John is rounding up horses in Indian country. Arriving at the Chaparral, Red Eagle's brother, White Horse (Albert Salmi) turns out to be a white renegade, who has rejected white civilisation and embraced the Apache way of life; but when his Apache wife falls sick, he must decide whether to summon a white doctor to save her.
