= Nödinge-Nol =

- Location within Västra Götaland Location within Sweden
- Coordinates: 57°54′N 12°04′E
- Country: Sweden
- Province: Västergötland
- County: Västra Götaland County
- Municipality: Ale Municipality

Area
  - Total: 5.99 km^{2} (2.31 sq mi)

Population (31 December 2010)
  - Total: 9,822
  - Density: 1,641/km^{2} (4,250/sq mi)
- Time zone: UTC+1 (CET)
  - Summer (DST): UTC+2 (CEST)

Nödinge-Nol is a locality and the seat of Ale Municipality in Västra Götaland County, Sweden. It had 9,822 inhabitants in 2010.

== Overview ==
The town of Nödinge-Nol is composed of three villages: Alafors, Nol and Nödinge, which have grown together into one locality. It is situated approximately 20 kilometres (12 miles) northeast of Gothenburg next to the euro highway E45, east of the river Göta Älv. Nödinge community was originally called Kyrkby, and has been the site of a church since medieval times. The current church was built in 1727 and is known for its high-quality murals.

Nödinge-Nol as a common village has been defined by the Central Bureau of Statistics. The Land Survey Place Name Unit still lists Nödinge, Nol and Alafors as separate localities.

The downtown area is dominated by apartment complexes and is surrounded by extensive countryside intermixed with villas. It includes Ale Torg shopping center, a junior high school, middle school, emergency room, library, sports arena, a nine-hole golf course and a small harbour. The main public transport is Gothenburg commuter rail, which has two stations in the town, Nödinge and Nol, and is around 15 minutes journey from Gothenburg.

The surrounding countryside includes very steep hills around the river Göta Älv. To the south-east is the 2,567 hectares (6,340 acres) Vättlefjäll nature reserve.
