= Älvängen =

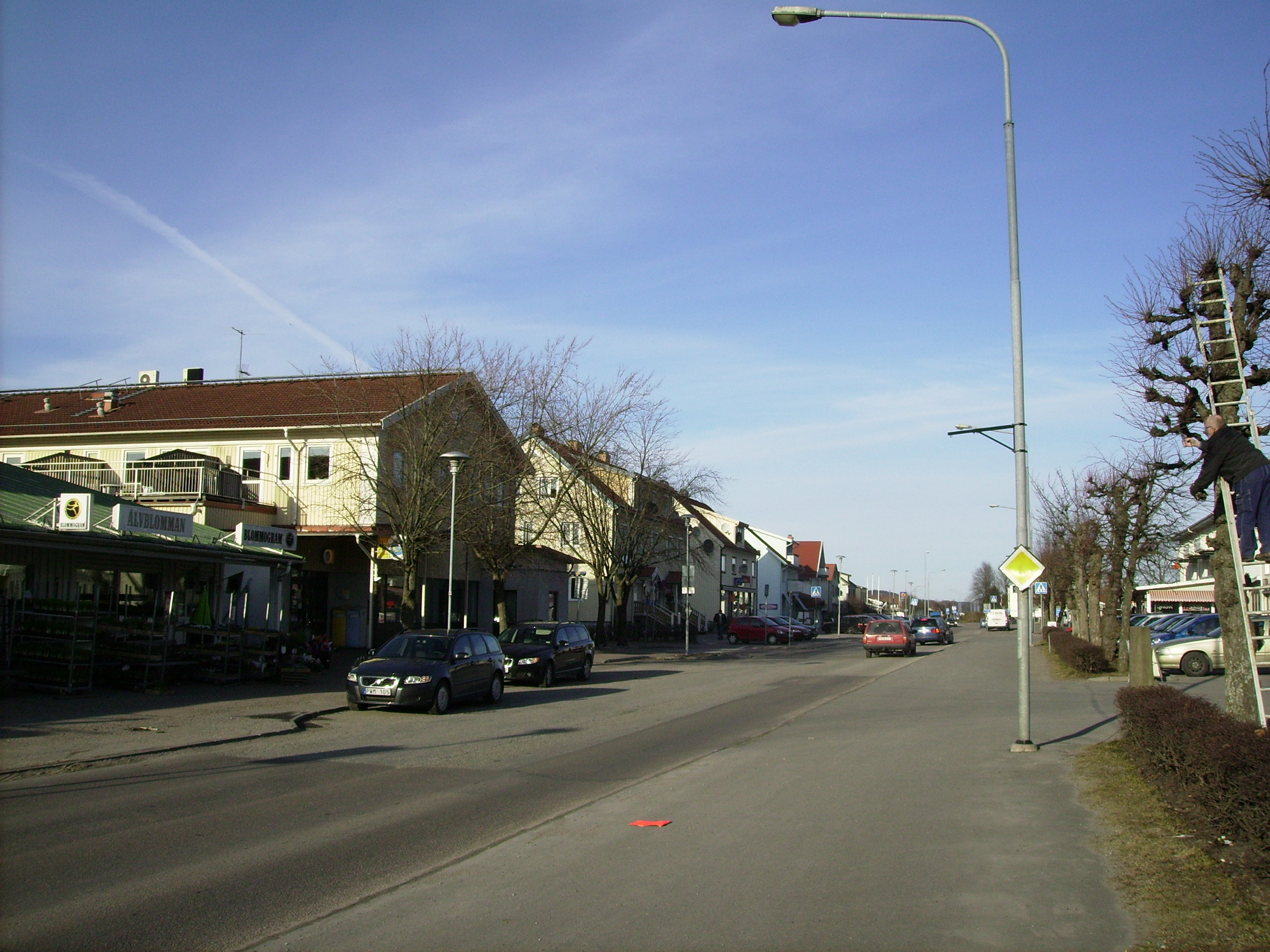

- Location within Västra Götaland Location within Sweden
- Coordinates: 57°57′N 12°07′E
- Country: Sweden
- Province: Västergötland
- County: Västra Götaland County
- Municipality: Ale Municipality

Area
  - Total: 2.96 km^{2} (1.14 sq mi)

Population (31 December 2010)
  - Total: 4,196
  - Density: 1,417/km^{2} (3,670/sq mi)
- Time zone: UTC+1 (CET)
  - Summer (DST): UTC+2 (CEST)

Älvängen (earlier Elfängen) is a locality situated in Ale Municipality, Västra Götaland County, Sweden. It had 4,196 inhabitants in 2010. It is located some 30 km (19 mi) north of Gothenburg. Among the churches of Älvängen are the Älvängen Church and the Starrkärr Church 4 km (2.5 mi).

Älvängen was the hometown of the painter and writer Ivar Arosenius. The football player Pontus Dahlberg was born and raised in Älvängen.

The P A Carlmarks rope factory was located to Älvängen. As of 2015, there is a museum in the old factory locals that shows the rope productions in the early beginning of the 20th century. The museum also produced the rope for the East Indiaman Götheborg.

== Notable people ==
- Martin "Rekkles" Larsson, professional League of Legends player for Los Ratones
- Pontus Dahlberg, football player for IFK Göteborg.
