= Ale Municipality =

Ale Municipality Ale kommun
- Municipality
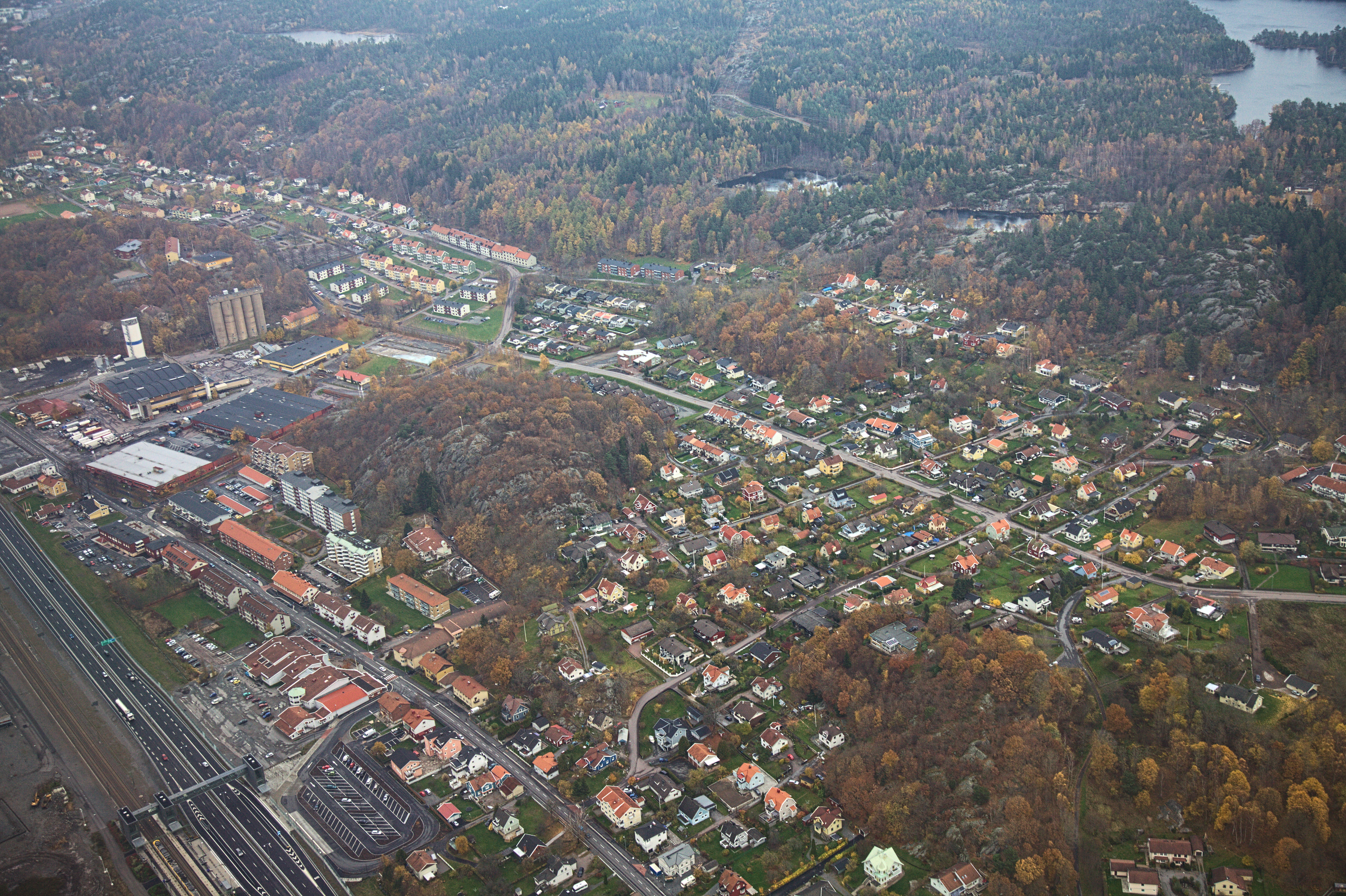

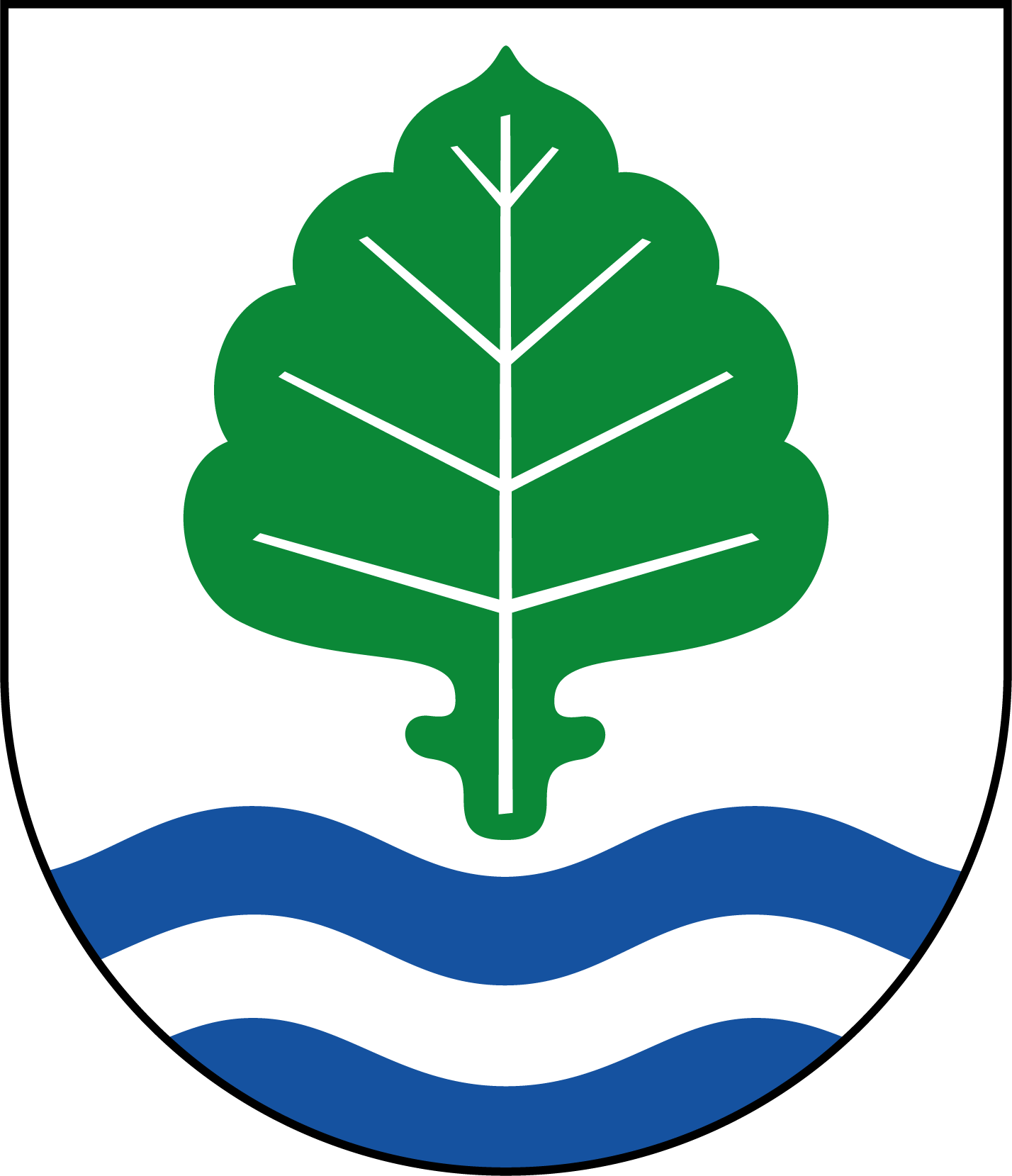
- Coat of arms

- Coordinates: 57°55′30″N 12°05′13″E
- Country: Sweden
- County: Västra Götaland County
- Seat: Nödinge-Nol

Area
  - Total: 332.1359 km^{2} (128.2384 sq mi)
  - Land: 317.0959 km^{2} (122.4314 sq mi)
  - Water: 15.04 km^{2} (5.81 sq mi)
- Area as of 1 January 2014.

Population (30 June 2025)
  - Total: 32,606
  - Density: 102.83/km^{2} (266.32/sq mi)
- Time zone: UTC+1 (CET)
  - Summer (DST): UTC+2 (CEST)
- ISO 3166 code: SE
- Province: Västergötland
- Municipal code: 1440
- Website: www.ale.se

Ale Municipality (Swedish: Ale kommun) is a municipality in Västra Götaland County in western Sweden. Its seat is located in the town of Nödinge-Nol, more precisely in Alafors at 57°55′33″N 12°5′1″E

Ale Municipality was created in 1974, when the former municipalities of Nödinge, Skepplanda and Starrkärr were amalgamated. The new entity got its name from the old Ale Hundred, which had approximately the same territory.

It built one of the first indoor bandy arenas in Sweden (and subsequently in the world), which was the first in Götaland, located in Bohuslän.

== Localities ==
Inhabitants figures from 2020.

- Nödinge-Nol 11,500 (seat)
- Surte 6,400
- Älvängen 6,100
- Skepplanda 1,900
- Alvhem 400

== Demographics ==
This is a demographic table based on Ale Municipality's electoral districts in the 2022 Swedish general election sourced from SVT's election platform, in turn taken from SCB official statistics.

In total there were 32,109 residents, including 23,187 Swedish citizens of voting age. 45.4% voted for the left coalition and 52.9% for the right coalition. Indicators are in percentage points except population totals and income.

Location	Residents	Citizen adults	Left vote	Right vote	Employed	Swedish parents	Foreign heritage	Income SEK	Degree
Location			%	%					
Alafors	2,162	1,634	50.7	48.5	87	85	15	28,313	37
Bohus N	1,479	1,089	47.3	51.0	82	64	36	27,160	39
Bohus S	1,864	1,351	49.8	48.4	84	65	35	28,331	43
Nol N	1,886	1,352	44.8	54.0	80	71	29	26,506	33
Nol S	1,767	1,276	48.4	50.3	86	79	21	28,586	38
Nödinge C	2,261	1,500	54.9	39.6	71	47	53	21,667	31
Nödinge S	2,126	1,472	46.2	52.4	85	77	23	29,873	52
Nödinge Ö	1,675	1,218	45.3	52.8	87	77	23	30,996	48
Skepplanda N	1,379	1,115	37.7	60.4	85	91	9	27,677	29
Skepplanda V	1,809	1,320	38.2	60.0	86	82	18	29,171	38
Skepplanda Ö	2,078	1,522	40.9	58.0	85	83	17	26,953	30
Starrkärr	1,875	1,422	36.3	62.6	86	90	10	27,970	30
Surte N	1,607	1,203	48.6	48.8	81	63	37	26,594	39
Surte S	1,663	1,198	48.8	49.6	79	56	44	27,490	42
Älvängen C	1,327	1,058	44.1	54.4	83	84	16	26,096	46
Älvängen N	1,357	1,008	45.9	53.2	82	81	19	26,789	36
Älvängen S	1,767	1,232	44.9	53.9	90	84	16	30,984	46
Älvängen Ö	2,027	1,217	46.2	52.8	91	76	24	32,655	56
Source: SVT

== Religion ==
- Kilanda Church

== Sister cities ==
Ale has two sister cities:

- Bertinoro, Italy
- Kaufungen, Germany
