= Surte =

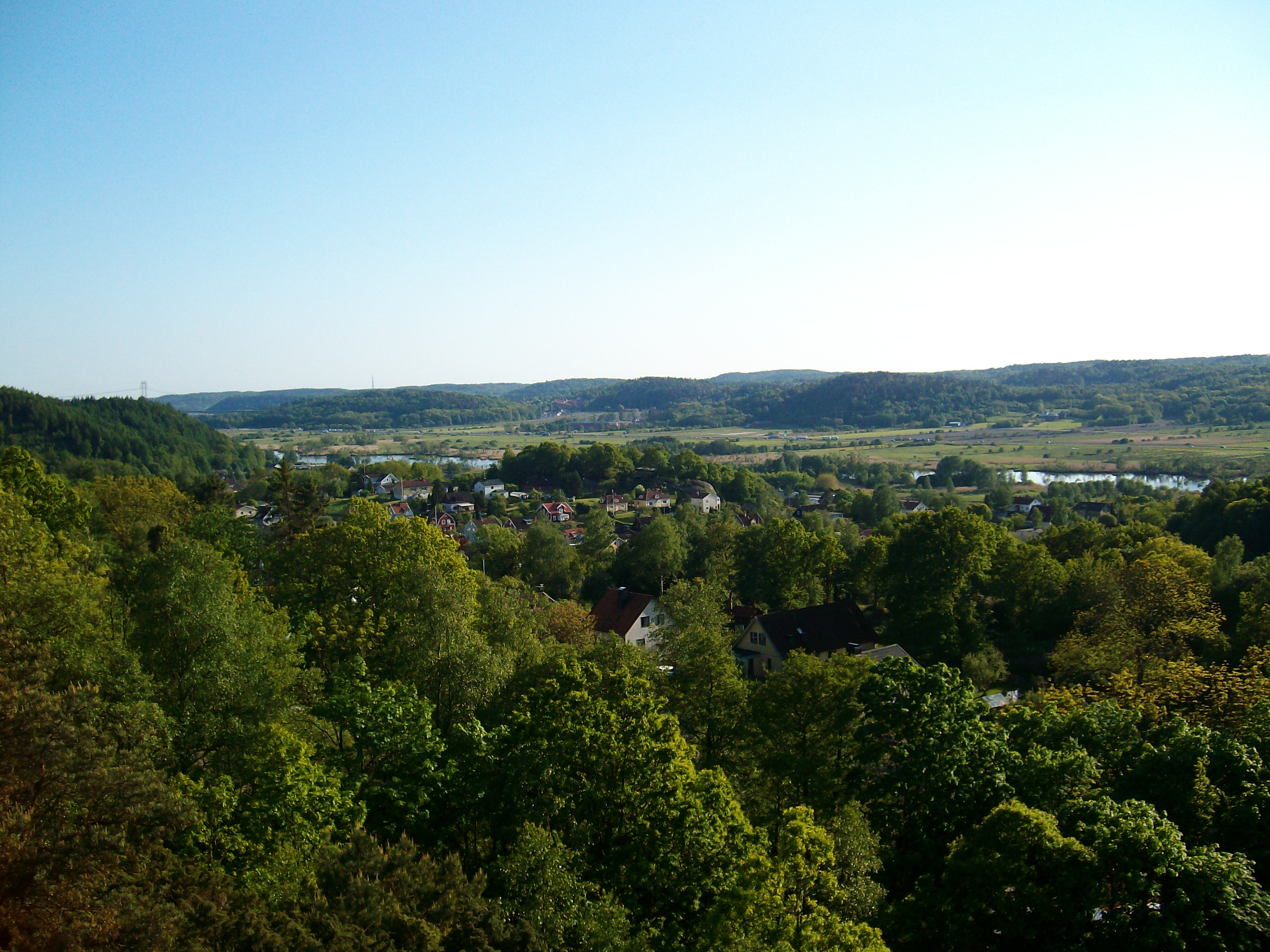
- Surte in September 2008

- Location within Västra Götaland Location within Sweden
- Coordinates: 57°49′N 12°01′E
- Country: Sweden
- Province: Västergötland and Bohuslän
- County: Västra Götaland County
- Municipality: Ale Municipality

Area
  - Total: 3.61 km^{2} (1.39 sq mi)

Population (31 December 2010)^{(including Bohus)}
  - Total: 5,798
  - Density: 1,604/km^{2} (4,150/sq mi)
- Time zone: UTC+1 (CET)
  - Summer (DST): UTC+2 (CEST)

Surte (Swedish pronunciation: [ˈsɵ̂ʈːɛ]) is a locality situated in Ale Municipality, Västra Götaland County, Sweden. It had 5,798 inhabitants in 2010. Surte Church is located in the town.

It is located some 15 kilometers north of Gothenburg city centre. Surte became well known for its glass works that started production in 1862 and became one of the major mechanized glass works in Sweden. It was bought by PLM in 1960 and shut down in 1978.

In Surte, there was a large landslide in 1950, which killed one person and destroyed 30 houses. More houses had to be removed, causing 450 people to lose their homes. It also blocked the river which had frequent ship traffic.

Surte was the hometown of Alexander Samuelson. Although he was not the designer, he was the man named on the 1915 design patent for the legendary contour Coca-Cola bottle.

The international Grand Master of chess Gideon Ståhlberg, one of the world's strongest players in the 1940s, was born and is buried in Surte.

Surte is home to the bandy club Surte BK. They built one of the first indoor bandy arenas in Sweden (and subsequently in the world), which was the first in Götaland.

The village Bohus, located 2½ km (1½ mile) north of Surte centre, has grown together with Surte and, in official statistics, is handled as one village.
