= 2006–07 in Swedish bandy =

The 2006–07 season in Swedish bandy, starting August 2006 and ending July 2007:

== Honours ==
=== Official titles ===
Title	Team	Reason
Swedish Champions 2006–07	Edsbyns IF	Winners of Elitserien play-off
Swedish Cup Champions 2006	Sandvikens AIK	Winners of Svenska Cupen

=== Competitions ===
Level	Competition	Team
1st level	Allsvenskan Norra 2006	Edsbyns IF
1st level	Allsvenskan Södra 2006	Hammarby IF
1st level	Elitserien 2007	Västerås SK
1st level	Superallsvenskan 2007	Broberg/Söderhamn Bandy
1st level	Elitserien play-off 2007	Edsbyns IF
2nd level	Division 1 Norra 2006	Kalix Bandy
2nd level	Division 1 Mellersta 2006	Västanfors IF
2nd level	Division 1 Södra 2006	Gripen Trollhättan BK
2nd level	Division 1 Norra Playoff 2007	Tillberga IK
2nd level	Division 1 Södra Playoff 2007	Gripen Trollhättan BK
Cup	Svenska Cupen 2006	Sandvikens AIK

== Promotions, relegations and qualifications ==
=== Promotions ===
Promoted from	Promoted to	Team	Reason
Division 1 Södra Playoff 2007	Allsvenskan Södra 2007–08	Gripen Trollhättan BK	Winners

=== Relegations ===
Relegated from	Relegated to	Team	Reason
Superallsvenskan 2007	Division 1 2007–08	Örebro SK	2nd in Södra promotion/relegation group
Superallsvenskan 2007	Division 1 2007–08	BS BolticGöta	7th team
Superallsvenskan 2007	Division 1 2007–08	Ljusdals BK	8th team

== Domestic results ==
=== 2006 Allsvenskan Norra ===
Allsvenskan Norra, Allsvenskan Södra

Played between 8 November 2006 – 29 December 2006.

Pos	Team	Pld	W	D	L	GF	GA	GD	Pts
1	Edsbyns IF	14	13	0	1	134	48	+86	26
2	Sandvikens AIK	14	12	1	1	144	40	+104	25
3	Bollnäs GIF	14	9	1	4	62	60	+2	19
4	Falu BS	14	6	1	7	53	75	−22	13
5	Broberg/Söderhamn Bandy	14	4	1	9	68	71	−3	9
6	IK Sirius	14	3	1	10	42	77	−35	7
7	Ljusdals BK	14	3	1	10	52	102	−50	7
8	Tillberga IK	14	3	0	11	55	107	−52	6

=== 2006 Allsvenskan Södra ===
Played between 10 November 2006 – 29 December 2006.

Pos	Team	Pld	W	D	L	GF	GA	GD	Pts
1	Hammarby IF	14	12	1	1	94	41	+53	25
2	Västerås SK	14	9	3	2	64	38	+26	21
3	Vetlanda BK	14	9	1	4	75	52	+23	19
4	Villa Lidköping BK	14	4	5	5	46	52	−6	13
5	IFK Motala	14	5	2	7	57	63	−6	12
6	IFK Vänersborg	14	4	3	7	47	58	−11	11
7	Örebro SK	14	2	2	10	52	87	−35	6
8	BS BolticGöta	14	2	1	11	44	88	−44	5

=== 2007 Elitserien ===
Played between 3 January 2007 – 18 February 2007.

Pos	Team	Pld	W	D	L	GF	GA	GD	Pts
1	Västerås SK	11	7	3	1	47	33	+14	17
2	Edsbyns IF	11	8	0	3	64	45	+19	16
3	Sandvikens AIK	11	7	1	3	63	38	+25	15
4	Hammarby IF	11	5	1	5	59	46	+13	11
5	Bollnäs GIF	11	5	0	6	42	52	−10	10
6	Vetlanda BK	11	4	1	6	49	49	0	9
7	Villa Lidköping BK	11	4	0	7	36	64	−28	8
8	Falu BS	11	0	2	9	39	72	−33	2

=== 2007 Superallsvenskan ===
Played between 3 January 2007 – 18 February 2007.

Pos	Team	Pld	W	D	L	GF	GA	GD	BP	Pts
1	Broberg/Söderhamn Bandy	11	6	2	3	64	46	+18	3	17
2	IFK Vänersborg	11	6	2	3	45	36	+9	2	16
3	IFK Motala	11	5	2	4	58	52	+6	3	15
4	IK Sirius	11	6	1	4	50	48	+2	2	15
5	Örebro SK	11	4	3	4	56	53	+3	3	14
6	Tillberga IK	11	5	1	5	58	58	0	0	11
7	BS Boltic/Göta	11	5	0	6	65	66	−1	0	10
8	Ljusdals BK	11	1	1	9	30	67	−37	1	4

=== 2007 Allsvenskan Norra qualification play-off ===
Pos	Team	Pld	W	D	L	GF	GA	GD	Pts
1	Tillberga IK	6	5	1	0	35	23	+12	11
2	Kalix Bandy	6	4	1	1	41	25	+16	9
3	Selånger SK	6	1	0	5	25	38	−13	2
4	Västanfors IF	6	1	0	5	27	42	−15	2

=== 2007 Allsvenskan Södra qualification play-off ===
Pos	Team	Pld	W	D	L	GF	GA	GD	Pts
1	Gripen Trollhättan BK	6	5	0	1	37	21	+16	10
2	Örebro SK	6	3	0	3	41	32	+9	6
3	Finspångs AIK	6	3	0	3	23	34	−11	6
4	IFK Kungälv	6	1	0	5	26	40	−14	2

=== 2007 Elitserien play-off ===
First round

21 February 2007

Broberg/Söderhamn Bandy	11–4	Villa Lidköping BK

Hällåsen, Söderhamn
23 February 2007

Villa Lidköping BK	3–6	Broberg/Söderhamn Bandy

Lidköpings Isstadion, Lidköping

21 February 2007

IFK Motala	4–3	Falu BS

Isstadion, Motala
23 February 2007

Falu BS	7–4	IFK Motala

Lugnets Isstadion, Falun

21 February 2007

IK Sirius	3–2	Bollnäs GIF

Studenternas IP, Uppsala
23 February 2007

Bollnäs GIF	7–0	IK Sirius

Sävstaås IP, Bollnäs

21 February 2007

IFK Vänersborg	1–4	Vetlanda BK

Vänersborgs Isstadion, Vänersborg
23 February 2007

Vetlanda BK	3–4	IFK Vänersborg

Tjustkulle, Vetlanda

Quarter-finals

25 February 2007

Västerås SK	5–0	Falu BS

Rocklunda IP, Västerås
27 February 2007

Falu BS	5–6	Västerås SK

Lugnets Isstadion, Falun

25 February 2007

Hammarby IF	7–2	Vetlanda BK

Zinkensdamms IP, Stockholm
27 February 2007

Vetlanda BK	3–4	Hammarby IF

Tjustkulle, Vetlanda

26 February 2007

Edsbyns IF	5–1	Broberg/Söderhamn Bandy

Edsbyn Arena, Edsbyn
28 February 2007

Broberg/Söderhamn Bandy	2–3	Edsbyns IF

Hällåsen, Söderhamn

26 February 2007

Sandvikens AIK	8–2	Bollnäs GIF

Jernvallen, Sandviken
28 February 2007

Bollnäs GIF	2–6	Sandvikens AIK

Sävstaås IP, Bollnäs

Semi-finals

4 March 2007

Västerås SK	4–6	Hammarby IF

Rocklunda IP, Västerås
6 March 2007

Hammarby IF	4–3	Västerås SK

Zinkensdamms IP, Stockholm
8 March 2007

Västerås SK	3–2	Hammarby IF

Rocklunda IP, Västerås
11 March 2007

Hammarby IF	8–2	Västerås SK

Zinkensdamms IP, Stockholm

5 March 2006

Edsbyns IF	6–4	Sandvikens AIK

Edsbyn Arena, Edsbyn
7 March 2006

Sandvikens AIK	3–2	Edsbyns IF

Jernvallen, Sandviken
9 March 2006

Edsbyns IF	8–2	Sandvikens AIK

Edsdbyn Arena, Edsbyn
11 March 2006

Sandvikens AIK	5–1	Edsbyns IF

Jernvallen, Sandviken
13 March 2007

Edsbyns IF	6–2	Sandvikens AIK

Edsdbyn Arena, Edsbyn

Final

18 March 2007

Hammarby IF	3–4	Edsbyns IF
M. Bergwall 28' (pen); Spjuth 43'; Ericsson 63'		Edling 69' (pen); Olsson 73'; Hedqvist 86'; Pär Törnberg 97'

Studenternas IP, Uppsala

== National team results ==
=== Russian Government Cup 2006 ===
In the Russian Government Cup 2006, played in Irkutsk and Shelekhov, Sweden won the silver medals. The Russian club team Baykal-Energiya Irkutsk replaced Finland, as the Finns chose not to come to the tournament.

- 8 December 2006: Sweden – Baykal-Energiya 7–2
- 9 December 2006: Sweden – Norway 13–2
- 10 December 2006: Russia – Sweden 2–1

=== Bandy World Championship for men 2007 ===
In the Bandy World Championship 2007, Sweden played in Group A. Sweden played the following matches and won the silver medals.

Preliminary round

- 28 January: Kazakhstan – Sweden 1–8
- 29 January: Sweden – Belarus 21–5
- 30 January: Sweden – Finland 4–5
- 31 January: Sweden – Russia 3–3
- 2 February: Sweden – Norway 20–7

Semifinal

- 3 February: Finland – Sweden 2–3 (golden goal)

Final

- 4 February: Russia – Sweden 3–1

=== Bandy World Championship for women 2007 ===
In the Bandy World Championship for women 2007, Sweden played the following matches and won the gold medals, becoming world champions for the third time.

Preliminary round

- 12 February: Sweden – Russia 3–3 (Russia won penalty shoot out)
- 13 February: Sweden – Hungary 6–0
- 13 February: Sweden – Norway 10–0
- 14 February: Sweden – United States 0–0 (Sweden won penalty shoot out)
- 15 February: Sweden – Canada 9–0
- 15 February: Sweden – Finland 7–1

Semifinal

- 16 February: Sweden – Norway 7–0

Final

- 17 February: Russia – Sweden 2–3
