= Pirjo Ahonen =

Finnish ice hockey and bandy player

- Born: 5 November 1970 (age 55) Jyväskylä, Finland
- Height: 173 cm (5 ft 8 in)
- Weight: 61 kg (134 lb; 9 st 8 lb)
- Position: Defence
- Shot: Left
- Played for: Ice hockey; JYP Jyväskylä; Ilves Tampere; KalPa Kuopio; Bandy; Kampparit Mikkeli; Veiterä Lappeenranta; Botnia-69 Helsinki; JPS Jyväskylä
- National team: Finland
- Playing career: 1995–2018
Medal record
Representing Finland
Women's ice hockey
World Championship
Bronze medal – third place	1999 Finland
Women's bandy
World Championship
Bronze medal – third place	2004 Finland
Bronze medal – third place	2008 Sweden
Bronze medal – third place	2012 Russia

Pirjo Hannele Ahonen (née Nieminen, previously Blomqvist; born 5 November 1970) is a Finnish retired ice hockey defenceman and bandy player and a former member of the Finnish women's national ice hockey team and national bandy team.

In ice hockey, she won a bronze medal with the Finnish national team at the 1999 IIHF Women's World Championship and competed in the women's ice hockey tournament at the 2002 Winter Olympics. Her ice hockey club career was played in the Naisten SM-sarja with KalPa Naiset, Tampereen Ilves Naiset, and JYP Jyväskylä Naiset, which was also known as the Jyväskylän Hockey Cats (JyHC) during her tenure.

Ahonen holds the record for most games played with the Finnish women's national bandy team, appearing in 63 international matches with the team. Having represented Finland at a number of Women's Bandy World Championships, she won bronze medals at the tournaments in 2004, 2008, and 2012. Her bandy club career was played with Jyväskylän Seudun Palloseura (JPS), Botnia-69 Helsinki, Veiterä Lappeenranta, and Mikkelin Kampparit. Ahonen was named Finnish Women's Bandy Player of the Year by the Finnish Bandy Association three times, in 2005, 2007, and 2012.
