= Women's Bandy World Championship =

Premier international competition for women in the sport of bandy

- Current season, competition or edition: 2026 Women's Bandy World Championship
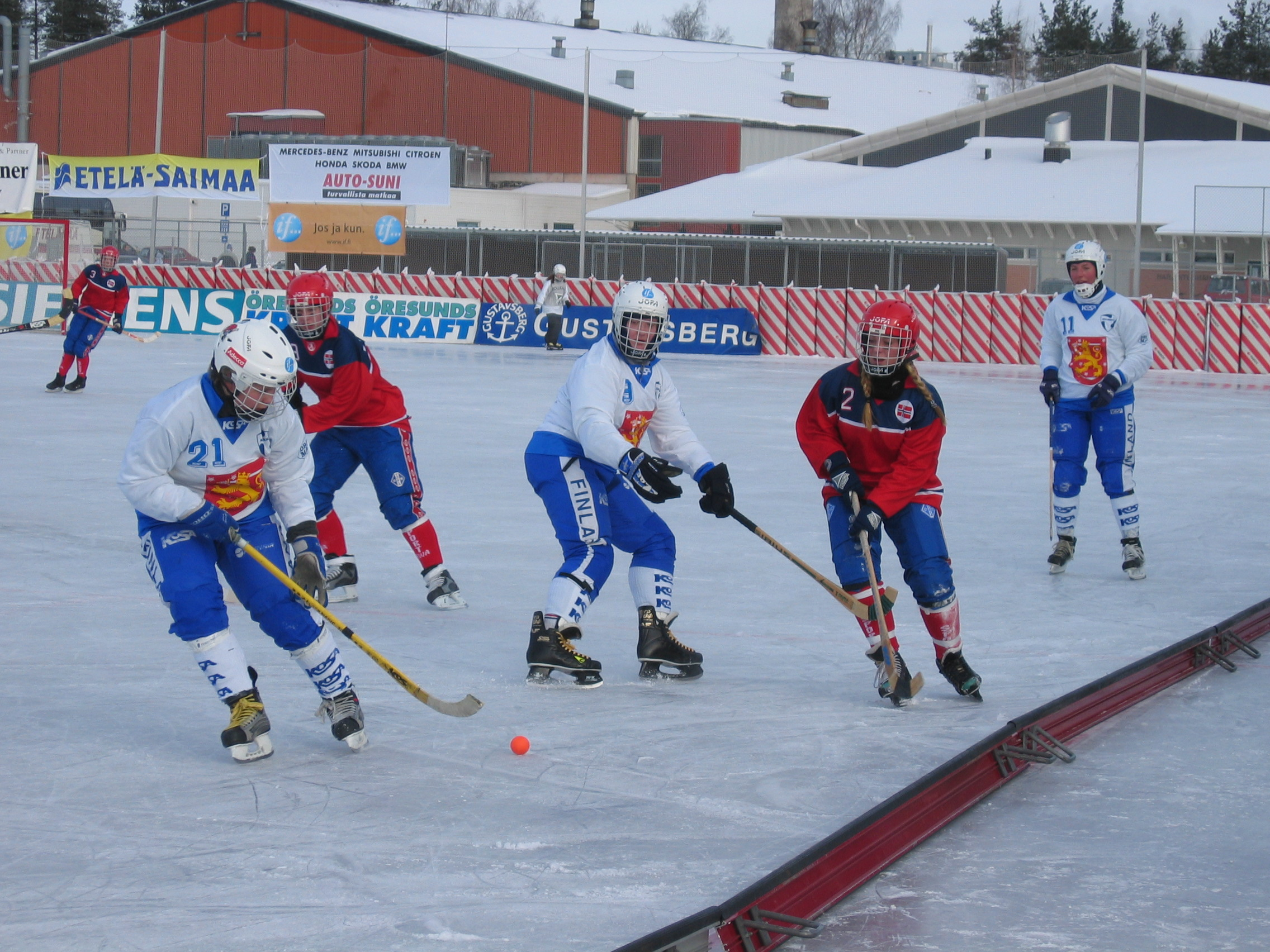
- Finland and Norway competing at the 2004 Women's World Championships in Lappeenranta
- Sport: Bandy
- First season: 2004; 22 years ago
- No. of teams: 8
- Countries: Worldwide
- Most recent champions: Sweden (12th title)
- Most titles: Sweden (12 titles)
- Website: worldbandy.com

The Women's Bandy World Championships is an international sports tournament for women and the premier international competition for women's bandy among bandy-playing nations. The tournament is administrated by the Federation of International Bandy.

It is distinct from the Bandy World Cup Women which is a women's club competition, the Bandy World Cup which is a club competition for men, and from the Bandy World Championship which is the premier international bandy competition for men's teams.

A Youth Bandy World Championship also exists separately from the women's senior competition and has competitions in both the male and female categories, with the F17 WC tournament representing the youth World Championship in bandy for girls up to 17 years of age.

Although the sport of bandy has been played by both men and women since the 19th century, the first men's world championship didn't take place until 1957, and the first official women's international bandy tournament only began in 2004. However, an international match between women's bandy teams from Sweden and Finland took place in Helsinki, Finland in 1935 at the Helsinki Ice Stadium, where a portion of the match was captured by British Pathé. The archival short film has been uploaded and published on the video sharing site, YouTube.

In 2023, the tournament will for the first time take place at the same time in the same arena as the equivalent among men.

== Participating nations ==
Until 2020, Sweden, Russia, Finland, Norway and USA have participated in every tournament, Canada in most of them, Hungary in two and China debuted in 2016. The record number of participants were 8, in 2018 and 2020. Estonia and Switzerland debuted in 2018, and Japan in 2020. Ukraine is scheduled to make its debut in 2023.

=== Participation details ===
Team	2004	2006	2007	2008	2010	2012	2014	2016	2018	2020	2022	2023	2025	2026	Total
Canada		6th	4th	5th	4th	4th	5th	4th							7
China								7th	6th						2
Estonia									7th	7th	7th				3
Finland	3rd	4th	5th	3rd	5th	3rd	3rd	6th	4th	4th	3rd	2nd	4th	4th	14
Germany													7th	8th	2
Great Britain											6th			6th	2
Hungary			7th	7th											2
Japan										6th					1
Netherlands											5th	4th	5th	5th	4
Norway	4th	3rd	3rd	4th	3rd	6th	4th	3rd	3rd	3rd	2nd		2nd	2nd	13
Russia	2nd	2nd	2nd	2nd	2nd	2nd	1st	2nd	2nd	2nd					10
Sweden	1st	1st	1st	1st	1st	1st	2nd	1st	1st	1st	1st	1st	1st	1st	14
Switzerland									8th	8th	8th	5th	8th	7th	6
Ukraine												6th	6th		2
United States	5th	5th	6th	6th	6th	5th	6th	5th	5th	5th	4th	3rd	3rd	3rd	14
Total teams	5	6	7	7	6	6	6	7	8	8	8	6	8	8	

== Results ==
Year	Final Venue (host city)	Gold	Result	Silver	Bronze	Result	Fourth place
2004; Details	(Finland); Kisapuiston tekojäärata (Lappeenranta)	Sweden	7–0	Russia	Finland	8–1	Norway
2006; Details	(United States); Guidant John Rose Minnesota Oval (Roseville)	Sweden	3–1	Russia	Norway	2–1	Finland
2007; Details	(Hungary); City Park Ice Rink (Budapest)	Sweden	3–2	Russia	Norway	4–3 (ps)	Canada
2008; Details	(Sweden); Tunets IP (Borlänge)	Sweden	5–2	Russia	Finland	5–3	Norway
2010; Details	(Norway) (Drammen)	Sweden	3–2 (OT)	Russia	Norway	3–2	Canada
2012; Details	(Russia); Rekord Stadium (Irkutsk)	Sweden	5–3	Russia	Finland	4–1	Canada
2014; Details	(Finland); Kisapuiston tekojäärata (Lappeenranta)	Russia	3–1	Sweden	Finland	3–2 (OT)	Norway
2016; Details	(United States); Guidant John Rose Minnesota Oval (Roseville)	Sweden	1–0	Russia	Norway	3–2 (OT)	Canada
2018; Details	(China); Chengde Mountain Resort (Chengde)	Sweden	1–0	Russia	Norway	5–2	Finland
2020; Details	(Norway); Frogner stadion (Oslo)	Sweden	3–1	Russia	Norway	6–1	Finland
2022; Details	(Sweden); Eriksson Arena (Växjö)	Sweden	12–0	Norway	Finland	5–2	United States
2023; Details	(Sweden); Eriksson Arena (Växjö)	Sweden	15–0	Finland	United States	4–0	Netherlands
2025; Details	(Sweden); Sparbanken Lidköping Arena (Lidköping)	Sweden	8–1	Norway	United States	7–2	Finland
2026; Details	(Finland); Pori artificial ice rink (Pori)	Sweden	9–1	Norway	United States	3–0	Finland

=== Medal table ===
* Host nation (-)

Rank	Nation	Gold	Silver	Bronze	Total
1	Sweden	13	1	0	14
2	Russia	1	9	0	10
3	Norway	0	3	6	9
4	Finland	0	1	5	6
5	United States	0	0	3	3
Totals (5 entries)		14	14	14	42

== Bandy World Championship G-17 ==
The Bandy World Championship G-17 or U17 (under 17) world championship in bandy for women, known as F17 WC and U17-världsmästerskapet i bandy för damer in Sweden, is the youth world championship in bandy for girls up to 17 years of age. The competition is held separately from the World Bandy Women's Championship which is for adults. G17 is sometimes written as F17 and the Y designations may also be written with a U.

The Youth Bandy World Championship is a tournament for girls' teams up to the age of 17 years. FC 17 is the only age group for which the world championship in bandy for young female players is held. The first tournament was held in 2009 and has since been held every two years.

Normally only teams from the main bandy countries of Finland, Norway, Russia and Sweden participate, but the United States has participated a few times and at the tournament in Irkutsk 2017, a China U17 team made its debut.

=== U17 medal table ===
Rank	Nation	Gold	Silver	Bronze	Total
1	Sweden	5	0	1	6
2	Russia	1	3	2	6
3	Finland	0	3	3	6
Totals (3 entries)		6	6	6	18

== Gallery ==
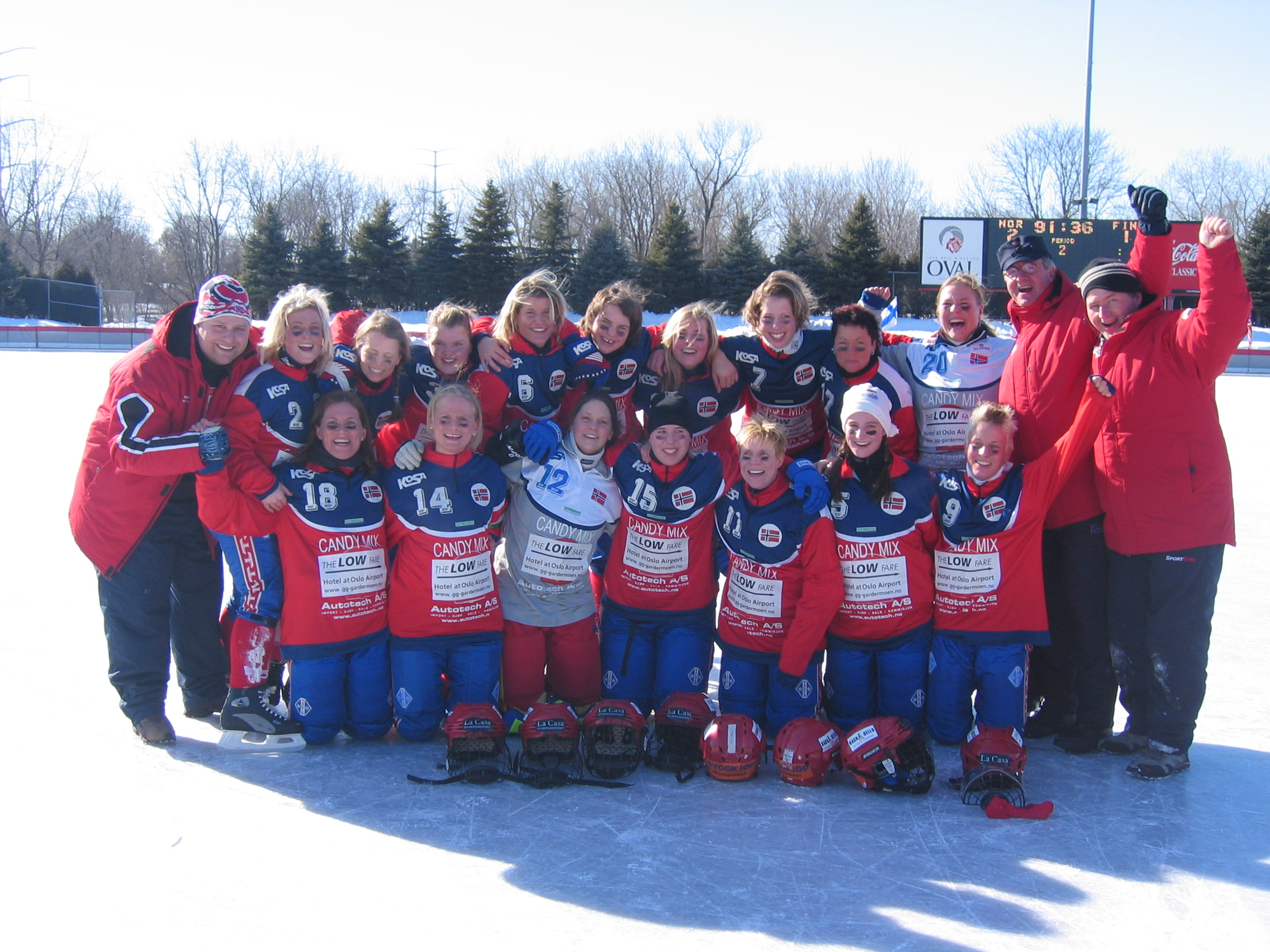
The Norwegian team celebrating the bronze medal in WCS 2006

== See also ==
- Bandy
- Rink bandy

Women's Bandy World Championship

  - Sweden women's national bandy team
  - Russia women's national bandy team
  - Finland women's national bandy team
  - Norway women's national bandy team
  - United States women's national bandy team
  - Switzerland women's national bandy team
  - China women's national bandy team
  - Canada women's national bandy team
  - Hungary women's national bandy team
  - Soviet Union women's national bandy team
