= 2026 Women's Bandy World Championship =

XIV Bandy World Championship

Tournament details
- Host countries: Finland; Sweden
- Cities: Pori (Group A); Uppsala (Group B)
- Venue(s): Pori artificial ice rink (Group A); Serwent Arena (Group B) (in 2 host cities)
- Dates: 14 – 18 January (Group A); 17 - 22 March (Group B)
- Teams: 4

Final positions
- Champions: Sweden (13th title)
- Runners-up: Norway
- Third place: United States
- Fourth place: Finland

The 2026 Bandy World Championship for women and the 2026 men's Bandy World Championship were played in Pori, Finland, on 14th – 18 January 2026. For the third time, the men's world championship and the women's world championship were played at the same arena and interwined with each other.

The four teams in this year's edition in Group A are Finland (hosts), Sweden, Norway and USA.

== Venues ==
All matches were played at Pori artificial ice rink, an outdoor bandy arena in Pori, Satakunta (Group A) and Serwent Arena, an indoor bandy arena in Uppsala, Sweden (Group B).

Finland	Sweden
Pori	Uppsala
Venue; Pori artificial ice rink	Venue; Serwent Arena
Capacity: 500	Capacity: 1,000

== Qualified nations ==
=== Division A ===
- Finland
- Norway
- Sweden
- United States

=== Division B ===
- Great Britain

== Group A ==
=== Group Stage ===
All times are local (UTC+2).

Pos	Team	Pld	W	D	L	GF	GA	GD	Pts	Qualification
1	Sweden	3	3	0	0	26	2	+24	6	Semifinals
2	Norway	3	2	0	1	10	11	−1	4	Semifinals
3	United States	3	1	0	2	5	12	−7	2	Semifinals
4	Finland (H)	3	0	0	3	0	16	−16	0	Semifinals

Source: profixio, FIB
(H) Hosts
14 January 2026
17:00

Finland	0–8	Sweden
	Report	Moa Friman 7'; Kajsa Ericsson 13'; Tilda Ström 23'; Karla Thuresson 43', 75'; Gabriella Aronsson 45+2'; Edit Ljung 71'; Ella Oskarsson 87'

Pori artificial ice rink, Pori
Attendance: 283
Referee: (United States) Stephanie Lynn Johnson
14 January 2026
20:00

Norway	4–1	United States
Laura Follesø 19'; Ina Dahl 74'; Charlotte Selbekk 88'; Marie Nordboe 90'	Report	Kenzie Prater 36'

Pori artificial ice rink, Pori
Attendance: 141
Referee: (Sweden) Sophia Wikström

15 January 2026
11:00

United States	1–8	Sweden
Allison Thunstrom 27'	Report	Gabriella Aronsson 7'; Sanna Gustafsson 17', 74' (p), 76'; Karla Thuresson 30'; Ella Oskarsson 43'; Edit Ljung 49'; Tilda Ström 71'

Pori artificial ice rink, Pori
Attendance: 105
Referee: (United States) Stephanie Lynn Johnson
15 January 2026
17:00

Norway	5–0	Finland
Laura Follesø 19', 25'; Isabel Robertsen 40'; Ingrid Tufte 47', 73'	Report

Pori artificial ice rink, Pori
Attendance: 305
Referee: (Sweden) Sophia Wikström

16 January 2026
09:00

Finland	0–3	United States
	Report	Katherine Noonan 21'; Makaila Anderson 67'; Allison Thunstrom 83'

Pori artificial ice rink, Pori
Attendance: 635
Referee: (United States) Stephanie Lynn Johnson
16 January 2026
21:00

Sweden	10–1	Norway
Tilda Ström 11', 38'; Karla Thuresson 12', 66'; Ella Oskarsson 15', 56'; Edit Ljung 27'; Tora Uebel 57'; Emelie Åkerlund 84', 90'	Report	Charlotte Selbekk 68'

Pori artificial ice rink, Pori
Attendance: 137
Referee: (Sweden) Sophia Wikström

=== Final round ===
==== Bracket ====
Semifinals
1	Sweden	9
4	Finland	0
2	Norway	5
3	United States	1

Final
1	Sweden	9
2	Norway	1
Third place
4	Finland	0
3	United States	3

==== Semifinals ====
17 January 2026
10:30

Sweden	9–0	Finland
Tilda Ström 16', 20', 67'; Ella Oskarsson 29'; Tova Grönoset 48', 70', 77'; Moa Friman 80'; Karla Thuresson 83'	Report

Pori artificial ice rink, Pori
Attendance: 217
Referee: (United States) Stephanie Lynn Johnson
17 January 2026
16:30

Norway	5–1	United States
Charlotte Selbekk 3', 29' (p); Anna Egeberg 16'; Laura Follesø 44'; Ingrid Tufte 66'	Report	Makaila Anderson 45+2'

Pori artificial ice rink, Pori
Attendance: 488
Referee: (Sweden) Sophia Wikström

==== Third place game ====
18 January 2026
08:00

Finland	0–3	United States
	Report	Tamara Meuwissen 66'; Ellen Larson 90'; Allison Thunstrom 90+3'

Pori artificial ice rink, Pori
Attendance: 196
Referee: (United States) Stephanie Lynn Johnson

==== Final ====
18 January 2026
14:00

Sweden	9–1	Norway
Edit Ljung 4', 61'; Tilda Ström 17', 81', 84'; Ella Oskarsson 24'; Tova Grönoset 55'; Karla Thuresson 67'; Sanna Gustafsson 82'	Report	76' Isabel Robertsen

Pori artificial ice rink, Pori
Attendance: 943
Referee: Sophia Wikström

=== Top Scorer ===
- 10 Goals: (Sweden) Tilda Ström
- 7 Goals: (Sweden) Karla Thuresson
- 6 Goals: (Sweden) Ella Oskarsson
- 5 Goals: (Sweden) Tova Grönoset
- 4 Goals: (Sweden) Edit Ljung
- 4 Goals: (Norway) Laura Follesø
- 4 Goals: (Norway) Charlotte Selbekk
- 4 Goals: (Sweden) Sanna Gustafsson
- 3 Goals: (Norway) Ingrid Tufte
- 3 Goals: (United States) Allison Thunstrom
- 2 Goals: (Sweden) Moa Friman
- 2 Goals: (Sweden) Gabriella Aronsson
- 2 Goals: (Norway) Isabel Robertsen
- 2 Goals: (United States) Makaila Anderson
- 1 Goal: (Sweden) Kajsa Ericsson
- 1 Goal: (Sweden) Tora Uebel
- 1 Goal: (Sweden) Emelie Åkerlund
- 1 Goal: (Norway) Ina Dahl
- 1 Goal: (Norway) Marie Nordboe
- 1 Goal: (Norway) Anna Egeberg
- 1 Goal: (United States) Kenzie Prater
- 1 Goal: (United States) Katherine Noonan
- 1 Goal: (United States) Tamara Meuwissen
- 1 Goal: (United States) Ellen Larson

== Group B ==
This year’s Group B was played in March (week 12) 2026. The tournament will take place in Serwent Arena, Uppsala, Sweden. This year's participants are not yet published and the last date for sign up was 2025-12-22.

=== Group stage ===
All times are local (UTC+1).

Pos	Team	Pld	W	D	L	GF	GA	GD	Pts	Qualification
1	Netherlands	3	3	0	0	26	3	+23	6	Final
2	Great Britain	3	2	0	1	20	14	+6	4	Final
3	Switzerland	3	0	1	2	7	18	−11	1	Third place game
4	Germany	3	0	1	2	4	22	−18	1	Third place game

Source: profixio, FIB
17 March 2026
14:00

Great Britain	2–10	Netherlands
Ila Hobbins 47'; Saga Hartley 90+1'	Report	Esther de Jong 20', 28', 34', 40', 71'; Michelle Noe 39'; Iris Hesen 44'; Leanne van der Wielen 58' (p), 76'; Lisette van der Kammen 63'

Serwent Arena, Uppsala
Attendance: 45
17 March 2026
17:30

Germany	3–3	Switzerland
Frida Wacker 29'; Lea Kaden 65'; Marie Meyer-Piton 70'	Report	Celie Hofer 39'; Naokie Rey 44'; Chanel Gilomen 89'
Penalties
	0–3	Alicia Hatt; Eva Chopard; Naokie Rey

Serwent Arena, Uppsala
Attendance: 102

18 March 2026
17:30

Netherlands	7–0	Germany
Leanne van der Wielen 10' (p), 47'; Britt Wortel 29', 49'; Esther de Jong 38'; Michelle Noe 51', 90+2'	Report

Serwent Arena, Uppsala
Attendance: 88
18 March 2026
20:00

Switzerland	3–6	Great Britain
Jacinthe Langlois 25'; Chanel Gilomen 50'; Eva Chopard 54'	Report	Saga Hartley 26', 48', 51'; Nandini Brolin 38'; Ila Hobbins 44'; Matilda Revell 88'

Serwent Arena, Uppsala
Attendance: 165

19 March 2026
14:00

Switzerland	1–9	Netherlands
Celie Hofer 15'	Report	Michelle Noe 1'; Iris Hesen 13', 19'; Esther de Jong 22', 34', 53'; Leanne van der Wielen 61', 83'; Lotte Krebaum 86' (p)

Serwent Arena, Uppsala
Attendance: 43
19 March 2026
17:30

Germany	1–12	Great Britain
Lea Kaden 6'	Report	Saga Hartley 8', 9', 22', 31', 36' (p), 37', 51', 53'; Nandini Brolin 45+3', 48'; Ila Hobbins 78'; Catherine Ruff 79'

Serwent Arena, Uppsala
Attendance: 88

=== Third place game ===
20 March 2026
19:00

Switzerland	3–0	Germany
	Report

Serwent Arena, Uppsala
Attendance: 177

=== Final ===
21 March 2026
14:00

Netherlands	5–3	Great Britain
	Report

Serwent Arena, Uppsala
Attendance: 110

== Final ranking ==
Rank	Team
1st place, gold medalist(s)	Sweden
2nd place, silver medalist(s)	Norway
3rd place, bronze medalist(s)	United States
4	Finland
5	Netherlands
6	Great Britain
7	Switzerland
8	Germany
