= Bandy World Championship G-17 =

- Status: Active
- Genre: Sports event
- Date: January–April
- Frequency: Biannual
- Location: Various
- Inaugurated: 2009; 17 years ago
- Organiser: FIB

The Bandy World Championship G-17, also designated Bandy World Championship F-17, is a Youth Bandy World Championship for girls' teams up to the age of 17 years. This is the only Youth Bandy World Championship age group for female players. Usually, only the core bandy playing nations are taking part, but the United States has also appeared on more than one occasion.

The first Bandy World Championship G-17 was held in 2009, and it has since held biannually.

== History ==
=== 2015 ===
The Swedish team won the 2015 World Championship G17, which was held at the Guidant John Rose Minnesota Oval, in Roseville, Minnesota, United States, in February 2015. Sweden defeated Russia in the final and Finland beat the USA for the bronze medals. Norway has taken part before, but did not in 2015.

=== 2017 ===
Logo of the 2017 games.

Sweden managed to defend the championship in 2017, when the competition was held in Irkutsk in Russia. The Swedish girls beat Russia in the final, while Finland took the bronze medals in a match for third place against Norway. The United States did not come to this year's tournament, but China made their debut, finishing fifth and last.

== Results ==
Year	Host	Final			Third place match		
Year	Host	Champion	Score	Runner-up	Third place	Score	Fourth place
2009	(Finland) Lappeenranta	Russia	3–2	Finland	Sweden	4–2	Norway
2011	(Russia) Obukhovo	Sweden	4–3 (pen)	Finland	Russia	4–3 (OT)	Norway
2013	(Sweden) Nässjö	Sweden	8–1	Finland	Russia	6–2	Norway
2015	(United States) Roseville	Sweden	5–0	Russia	Finland	2–0	United States
2017	(Russia) Irkutsk	Sweden	3–1	Russia	Finland	1–0	Norway
2019	(Finland) Varkaus	Sweden	2–1 (OT)	Russia	Finland	3–2 (pen)	Norway
2022	(Sweden) Lidköping	Sweden	Round-robin	Norway	Finland	Round-robin	
2023	(Norway) Oslo	Sweden	Round-robin	Norway	Finland	Round-robin	
2025	(Sweden) Trollhättan	Sweden	Round-robin	Finland	Norway	Round-robin	
2026	(Sweden) Uppsala	Sweden	Round-robin	Finland	Norway	Round-robin	

== Medal table ==
Rank	Nation	Gold	Silver	Bronze	Total
1	Sweden (SWE)	9	0	1	10
2	Russia (RUS)	1	3	2	6
3	Finland (FIN)	0	5	5	10
4	Norway (NOR)	0	2	2	4
Totals (4 entries)		10	10	10	30
