= 2016 Women's Bandy World Championship =

8th Women's Bandy World Championship

Tournament details
- Host country: USA
- City: Roseville, Minnesota
- Venue: Guidant John Rose Minnesota Oval
- Dates: February 18 – 21, 2016
- Teams: 7

Final positions
- Champions: Sweden
- Runners-up: Russia
- Third place: Norway
- Fourth place: Canada

Tournament statistics
- Games played: 26
- Goals scored: 143 (5.5 per game)
- Scoring leader(s): (Sweden) Matilda Svenler (Russia) Olga Rodionov (10 points)

2016 Women's Bandy World Championship was held in Roseville, Minnesota, USA, on February 18–21, 2016. The Guidant John Rose Minnesota Oval hosted the games.

This was the eighth Women's Bandy World Championship and the second Women's Bandy World Championship hosted by the United States. China made its championship debut.

Sweden had won all the previous Women's World Championships of bandy except the last one in 2014, which was won by Russia. The Swedes responded this year by defeating the Russians in the final by 1 goal to 0.

== Participating teams ==
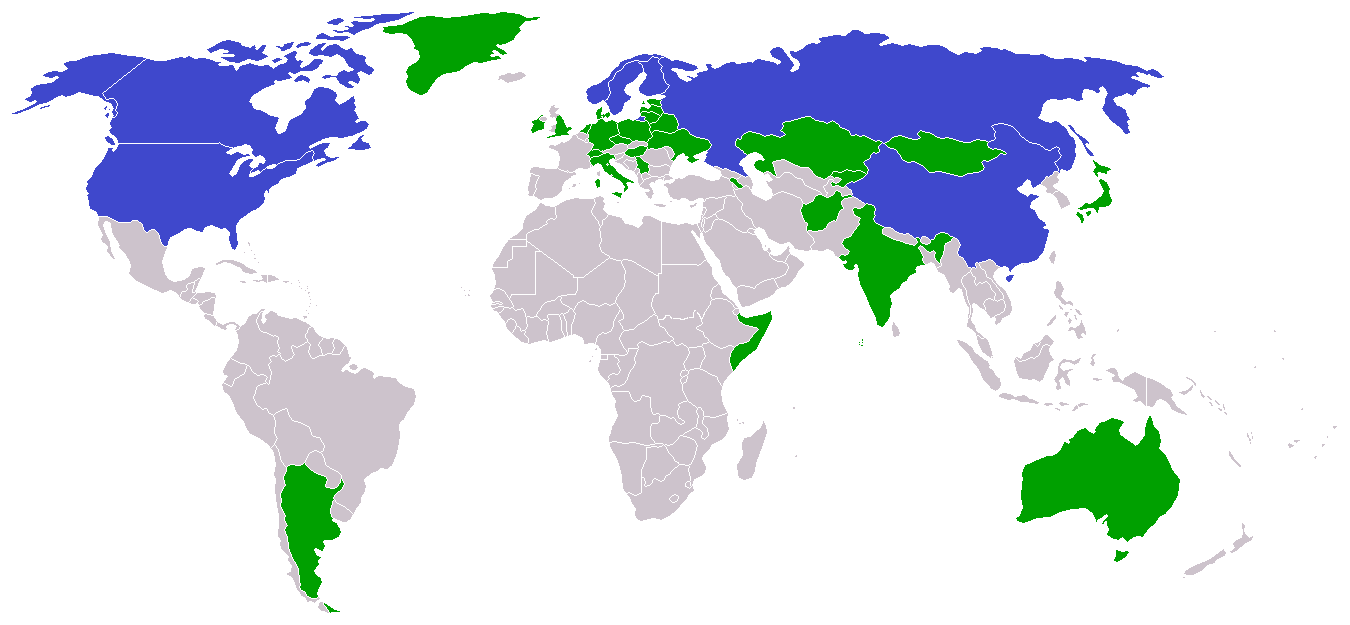
Participation in the 2016 Women's Bandy World Championship: Blue: Participating countries Green: Members of the FIB who did not participate in the 2016 Women's World Championship

- Canada
- China
- Finland
- Norway
- Russia
- Sweden
- United States

== Venue ==
Guidant John Rose Minnesota Oval
Host venue
Location	United States – Roseville, Minnesota
Constructed	Opened: December 1993
Capacity	

== Tournament ==
=== Preliminary round ===
==== Standings ====
Pos	Team	Pld	W	D	L	GF	GA	GD	Pts	Qualification
1	Sweden	6	6	0	0	34	4	+30	12	Quarterfinals
2	Russia	6	5	0	1	31	3	+28	10	Quarterfinals
3	Norway	6	3	1	2	18	9	+9	7	Quarterfinals
4	Canada	6	3	0	3	11	9	+2	6	Quarterfinals
5	United States (H)	6	2	1	3	16	15	+1	5	5th place game
6	Finland	6	1	0	5	11	29	−18	2	5th place game
7	China	6	0	0	6	0	52	−52	0	

(H) Hosts

==== Games ====
All times local (UTC -6)

1
February 18, 2016
08:00

United States	9 – 0 (4-0, 5-0)	China
Thunstrom (4), Wanecke (2), Ozmen, Rueping, McClintick	Report

Guidant John Rose Minnesota Oval, Roseville, Minnesota
2
February 18, 2016
10:00

Finland	0 – 9 (0-7, 0-2)	Russia
	Report	Lipanova (2), Bogdanova (3), Mashinskaya, Tischenko, Rodionova (2)

Guidant John Rose Minnesota Oval, Roseville, Minnesota
3
February 18, 2016
11:55

Norway	1 – 4 (0-0, 1-4)	Sweden
Holm	Report	Gunnarsson (2), Johansson, Adolfsson

Guidant John Rose Minnesota Oval, Roseville, Minnesota
4
February 18, 2016
13:50

Russia	2 – 0 (1-0, 1-0)	Canada
Rodionova (2)	Report

Guidant John Rose Minnesota Oval, Roseville, Minnesota
5
February 18, 2016
16:00

China	0 – 9 (0-3, 0-6)	Finland
	Report	Klemola (2), Lappalainen, Isaksson (2), Pekonen (2), Karppinen, Eklund

Guidant John Rose Minnesota Oval, Roseville, Minnesota
6
February 18, 2016
18:00

United States	1 – 7 (3-0, 4-1)	Sweden
	Report

Guidant John Rose Minnesota Oval, Roseville, Minnesota
7
February 18, 2016
20:00

Canada	0 – 3 (0-2, 0-1)	Norway
	Report	Berntsen-Lillejord, Selbekk, Nygaard

Guidant John Rose Minnesota Oval, Roseville, Minnesota
8
February 19, 2016
08:00

United States	1 – 1 (0-0, 1-1)	Norway
Fleming	Report	Dybwad

Guidant John Rose Minnesota Oval, Roseville, Minnesota
9
February 19, 2016
10:00

Finland	0 – 3 (0-3, 0-0)	Canada
	Report	Ferguson (3)

Guidant John Rose Minnesota Oval, Roseville, Minnesota
10
February 19, 2016
11:55

China	0 – 10 (0-8, 0-2)	Russia
	Report	Gurinchik, Mikhailova, Bogdanova (2), Tkhir, Rodionova (2), Lipanova (3)

Guidant John Rose Minnesota Oval, Roseville, Minnesota
11
February 19, 2016
13:50

United States	5 – 1 (4-0, 1-1)	Finland
Carroll (3), Stech, Kennedy	Report	Eklund

Guidant John Rose Minnesota Oval, Roseville, Minnesota
12
February 19, 2016
16:00

Canada	0 – 4 (0-1, 0-3)	Sweden
	Report	Erlandsson, Gustafsson, Svenler, Gunnarsson

Guidant John Rose Minnesota Oval, Roseville, Minnesota
13
February 19, 2016
18:00

Russia	3 – 0 (2-0, 1-0)	Norway
Rodionova, Lipanova (2)	Report

Guidant John Rose Minnesota Oval, Roseville, Minnesota
14
February 19, 2016
20:00

Sweden	10 – 0 (5-0, 5-0)	China
Brusberg, Gunnarsson, Svenler, Persson, Widing, C. Andersson, Bergvall, M. Andersson, Adolfsson, Elovsson	Report

Guidant John Rose Minnesota Oval, Roseville, Minnesota
15
February 20, 2016
08:00

Sweden	6 – 0 (3-0, 3-0)	Finland
Svenler (2), Gunnarsson (2), Persson (2)	Report

Guidant John Rose Minnesota Oval, Roseville, Minnesota
16
February 20, 2016
10:00

United States	0 – 5 (0-3, 0-2)	Russia
	Report	Gurinchik (2), Tkhir, Rodionova, Igonina

Guidant John Rose Minnesota Oval, Roseville, Minnesota
17
February 20, 2016
11:55

Norway	7 – 0 (4-0, 3-0)	China
Aamodt, Selbekk (3), Dybwad, Holm, Storvik	Report

Guidant John Rose Minnesota Oval, Roseville, Minnesota
18
February 20, 2016
13:50

Russia	2 – 3 (1-2, 1-1)	Sweden
Gurinchik, Mikhailova	Report	Brusberg, Johansson, Persson

Guidant John Rose Minnesota Oval, Roseville, Minnesota
19
February 20, 2016
16:00

China	0 – 7 (0-3, 0-4)	Canada
	Report	Ferguson (4), Nash (2), Burns

Guidant John Rose Minnesota Oval, Roseville, Minnesota
20
February 20, 2016
18:00

Finland	1 – 6 (1-4, 0-2)	Norway
Pekonen	Report	Dybwad, Berntsen-Lillejord, Selbekk, Aamodt (2), Holm

Guidant John Rose Minnesota Oval, Roseville, Minnesota
21
February 20, 2016
20:00

United States	0 – 1 (0-0, 0-1)	Canada
	Report	Wysocki

Guidant John Rose Minnesota Oval, Roseville, Minnesota

=== Knock-out stage ===
==== Semi-finals ====
22
February 21, 2016
08:00

Sweden	7 – 0 (6-0, 1-0)	Canada
	Report

Guidant John Rose Minnesota Oval, Roseville, Minnesota
23
February 21, 2016
10:00

Russia	5 – 0 (3-0, 2-0)	Norway
	Report

Guidant John Rose Minnesota Oval, Roseville, Minnesota

==== Third-place game ====
25
February 21, 2016
14:00

Norway	3 – 2	Canada
	Report

Guidant John Rose Minnesota Oval, Roseville, Minnesota

==== Final ====
26
February 21, 2016
16:00

Sweden	1 – 0	Russia
	Report

Guidant John Rose Minnesota Oval, Roseville, Minnesota

=== Consolation tournament ===
==== Fifth place game ====
24
February 21, 2016
12:00

United States	3 – 1	Finland
	Report

Guidant John Rose Minnesota Oval, Roseville, Minnesota

== Broadcasting ==
The games were broadcast online by Perfect Storm Broadcasting.
