= Canada women's national bandy team =

Women's bandy team representing Canada

Canada
- The Maple Leaf has always appeared on the uniform
- Association: Canada Bandy
- Head coach: (Canada)
- Team colors
Home colours	Away colours

First international
- Canada 0–4 Norway (Roseville, Minnesota; February 14, 2006)

Women's Bandy World Championship
- Appearances: 7 (first in 2006)
- Best result: 4th (2007, 2010, 2012, 2016)

Canada women's national bandy team
Medal record

Women's Bandy World Championship
	2004	No Team
	2006 United States	Team
	2007 Hungary	Team
	2008 Sweden	Team
	2010 Norway	Team
	2012 Russia	Team
	2014 Finland	Team
	2016 United States	Team
	2018 China	No Team
	2020 Norway	No Team
	2022 Sweden	No Team
	2023 Sweden	No Team

Women's Under-18 Bandy World Cup
	2015 Sweden	St. Mary’s Academy Flames

Canada's women's national bandy team (French: Équipe nationale féminine de bandy du Canada) is the women's bandy team representing Canada. Historically the squad has been based in Winnipeg, Manitoba. The women's national team has competed in the Women's Bandy World Championship and North American Bandy Championship. It made its world debut at the 2004 Women's Bandy World Championship. Team Canada has not competed internationally since the 2016 Women's Bandy World Championship.

The governing body for the sport of bandy in Canada is Canada Bandy whose headquarters are located in Winnipeg, Manitoba. Canada also has a Canadian national bandy team for men. This article deals chiefly with Canada's women's national bandy team.

Because bandy is a "cult sport" in Canada without a grassroots base the team therefore draws its talent from the sports of ringette and women's ice hockey. A majority of its senior-level team members have been high performance athletes who come from the sport of ringette, some having played for Canada's national ringette team and/or in Canada's semi-professional showcase ringette league, the National Ringette League.

While Canada is a country with a strong tradition in ice hockey and ringette, both sports are played on an ice rink and Canada does not have artificial ice rinks large enough to qualify as regulation sized bandy fields. In the past, the Canadian women's bandy team practiced on a frozen water hazard on a Winnipeg golf course. Team Canada has competed in the United States where full-sized bandy fields exist.

The team has participated in every Women's Bandy World Championship since the second tournament in 2006 but has not competed since 2016. During its existence, the national women's bandy team reached a historic 4th place internationally in the 2007, 2010, 2012, and 2016 Women's Bandy World Championships, but to date has never finished higher, nor has the Canadian team ever medaled. It is unclear whether the women's national team is still active.

In the junior age group, a girls ice hockey team from Winnipeg competed in the Women's Under-18 Bandy World Cup in Sweden in 2015, the first ever Canadian youth team to play in the international tournament. However this was an international tournament for club teams only and not the international junior competition which is the Bandy World Championship G-17 or U17 (under 17) world championship in bandy for girls, known as F17 WC. G17 is sometimes written as F17 and the Y designations may also be written with a U.

== History ==
A group of ladies participated in a bandy tournament in Russia in 1990 and also had some exhibition matches in the Netherlands that year. Team Canada played its first official international series against the United States women's national bandy team in December, 2005. The team practiced on a frozen water hazard at the Harbour View Golf Course in Winnipeg, Manitoba.

The women's program really began in 2006 with a number of ringette players taking on a new sport and participating in the 2006 Women's Bandy World Championship in Roseville, Minnesota.

=== Junior teams ===
For the under 19 age group, Canada has only had a girls bandy team once in the nation's history to date which has competed in an international competition of any kind. In 2015, a girls high school ice hockey team from Winnipeg, the St. Mary's Academy Flames, competed in the Women's Under-18 Bandy World Cup in Sweden. The Flames were the first ever Canadian Under-18 team to play in the international tournament which is a competition for the best women's club teams from around the world.

== World Championship results ==
Canada competed in every Women's Bandy World Championship from 2006 until 2018. Historically, Canada has established a senior national women's bandy team which competes in the Women's Bandy World Championship, but has not established a junior women's national bandy team to compete in the world junior bandy tournament for girls.

=== Senior Canada ===
Women's Bandy World Championships
Year	Location	Result	Notes
2004 Details	Lappeenranta, Finland	No team	
2006 Details	(United States) Roseville, USA	5th	
2007 Details	Budapest, Hungary	4th	
2008 Details	Borlänge, Grängesberg and Karlsbyheden, Sweden	5th	
2010 Details	Drammen, Norway	4th	
2012 Details	Irkutsk, Russia	4th	
2014 Details	Lappeenranta, Finland	5th	
2016 Details	(United States) Roseville, USA	4th	
2018 Details	Chengde, China	No team	
2020 Details	Oslo, Norway	No team	
2022 Details	Åby, Sweden	No team	
2023 Details	Åby, Sweden	No team	

== National teams by year ==
=== 2007 Seniors ===
The 2007 Women's Bandy World Championship took place in February 11–17 in Budapest, Hungary. It was only the second time Canada fielded a team to compete at a World Bandy Championship. The international tournament included representative teams from Russia, Finland, Norway, United States, Sweden and the host nation, Hungary.

The Canadian team, coached by Gennaro Macchia and Goran Svensson, put forth a spirited effort against each of the competing nations, and for the first time, a North American team competed for a medal with Team Canada playing the favoured Norway team in the bronze medal game. The game finished tied 3-3 after regulation time, only to see the Canadians come up short in a penalty shot shootout. Team Canada opened the scoring, later falling behind 3–1, but fought hard to get back to even and carried the play throughout most of the second half. In all, Team Canada posted victories against Hungary, USA and Finland, finishing the round-robin play with 3 wins and 3 losses, losing to the World Champions from Sweden, Russia and Norway. As a result of their play, Team Canada earned a place in a semi-final game against Russia, before playing Norway in the bronze medal final, February 16. The Canadian Team was made up of elite athletes from Winnipeg and surrounding areas.

"They did Canada proud" said Genarro Macchia, the coach for Team Canada. "Last year we posted only one win and scored just two goals. This year we improved that position winning three round robin games, scoring 19 goals and playing in a bronze medal final for the first time in Canadian Bandy history, only to fall short after playing to a 3-3 tie during regulation time. Considering this is only our second year playing and our second world championship, Team Canada served notice that they are now ready to compete against the elite teams in the world. The future of Women's Bandy in Canada looks bright," added Macchia.

Christine Deslisle wound up playing for a Swedish women's bandy team, Stockholm AIK for the 2007/2008 season.

2007 Seniors
Number	Name	Position
	Shelly Hruska	
	Mandy Nordstrom	
	Dominique Carriere	
	Christine Delisle	
	Lindsay Myseniuk	
	Kristy Maksymyk	
	Caley Miskimmin	
	Amy Clarkson	
	Danielle Sykes	
	Lynn Despiegelaere	
	Courtney Burns	
	Lindsay Burns	
	Aisnley Ferguson	
	Andrea Ferguson	
	Michelle Madziak	
	Chelsea Hansen	
	Sheena MacDonald	

Team Staff
Position	Name
Coach	Gennaro Macchia (from Sweden)
Coach	Goren Svensson (from Sweden)
Manager	Jan Burns
Team Leader	Colin Ferguson

=== 2016 Seniors ===
Team members of the Team Canada's 2016 Women's bandy squad included Stonewall's Sheena MacDonald, Winnipeg's Ainsley Ferguson, Kenora-born Julie Johnson, Delisle-Nyström, Winnipeg's Taylor Homenick, Winnipeg's Amy Clarkson, and Lindsay Burns among others.

== North American Bandy Championship ==
This competition is a cross-border contest between bandy teams from Canada and the USA. The event is hosted in Roseville, Minnesota by USA Bandy.

In February 2015, team Canada beat the rival U.S. national team in a best-of-three series to retain the North American Bandy Championship.

== Film ==
The women's national bandy team was part of a 2 part documentary created in 2010 by Ora Walker called "True North Strong", however the documentary did not mention the players with backgrounds in ringette, the Canadian national ringette team, or the National Ringette League of Canada.

== Notable players ==
Notable players include Shelly Hruska and Lindsay Burns. Burns scored Canada's first goal in the nations history of organized women's bandy. Hruska and Burns have also played semi-professional ringette in the Canadian National Ringette League and for the Canadian National Ringette Team.

== See also ==
- Bandy
- Rink bandy
- Women's Bandy World Championship
  - Great Britain women's national bandy team
  - Sweden women's national bandy team
  - Russia women's national bandy team
  - Finland women's national bandy team
  - Norway women's national bandy team
  - Switzerland women's national bandy team
  - China women's national bandy team
  - United States women's national bandy team
  - Hungary women's national bandy team
  - Soviet Union women's national bandy team
