= Shelly Hruska =

Canadian ringette and bandy player

Medal record
Ringette
World Ringette Championships
Representing Canada
Gold medal – first place	2002; World Ringette Championships	Team
Silver medal – second place	2004; World Ringette Championships	Team
Bandy
Women's Bandy World Championship
Representing Canada: 2008 Women's Bandy World Championship, 5th; 2010 Women's Bandy World Championship, 4th

Shelly Hruska is a Canadian Metis, a former ringette and bandy player, coach, and teacher from Winnipeg, Manitoba. Hruska helped lead Team Canada twice to victory in the World Ringette Championships.

Hruska was a member of 2002 national ringette team who won gold at the 2002 World Ringette Championships in Edmonton, Alberta, then became a member of the 2004 national ringette team once again, competing at the 2004 World Ringette Championships in Stockholm, Sweden where she played a key role on the team which won the silver. In 2010, Hruska helped the Canada women's national bandy team to a 4th place finish overall at the 2010 Women's Bandy World Championship.

Hruska was inducted into the Ringette Manitoba Hall of Fame in 2016–2017 under the category, "Player". On April 12, 2023, Hruska was inducted into the Manitoba Indigenous Sports Hall of Fame.

== Early life ==
At a young age, Hruska was involved in many sports, including ballet, tap dancing, softball, baseball, figure skating, and ringette. Having originally learned to skate on figure skates, Hruska's parents enrolled her in power skating to teach her to skate on hockey skates. Growing up in Winnipeg, Hruska joined a ringette team, where she enjoyed the team's cooperation, closeness, and team spirit. Hruska made A-level ringette teams in Winnipeg and eventually became a strong ringette player by the age of 14.

== Playing career ==
=== Ringette ===
At the age of 15, Hruska made the APFG Sixers, an AA provincial ringette team. Hruska and the Sixers won the provincial championships and went on to represent Manitoba at the national ringette championships known as the Canadian Ringette Championships. Hruska was continually asked to represent Manitoba every year that followed, eventually helping Team Manitoba capture silver at the 1999 Canada Winter Games.

As her playing career continued, she tried out for Team Canada and made the team in time for the 2002 World Ringette Championships in Edmonton, Alberta where Team Canada won gold defeating Finland 3-1. Hruska represented Team Canada once again at the 2004 World Ringette Championships in Stockholm, Sweden, where she was a key player in their victory.

=== Women's bandy ===
In 2008, Hruska helped Team Canada capture 5th place at the Women's Bandy World Championship.

In 2010, Hruska helped Team Canada capture 4th place at the Women's Bandy World Championship.

== Personal life ==
In her personal time Hruska is a certified Level 2 ringette coach and an instructor at the Lisa Brown Ringette Retreat in Calgary, Alberta. Hruska also acts as a motivational speaker to inspire Aboriginal and non-Aboriginal communities while promoting a healthy active lifestyle and its benefits.

== Awards & Achievements ==
Year	Award	Notes
1999	Canada Winter Games, Ringette, Runner Up	Team Manitoba
2002	(gold) World Ringette Champion	Team Canada in Edmonton, Alberta
2004	(silver) World Ringette Champion	Team Canada in Stockholm, Sweden
2004	Manitoba Aboriginal Youth Achievement Award	Winner
2005	Tom Longboat Award as Manitoba's Aboriginal Athlete of the Year	Co-Winner with Garnet Desjarlais of Winnipeg (ball hockey)
2008	World Bandy Championship, 5th place	Team Canada
2010	World Bandy Championship, 4th place	Team Canada

== See also ==
- Canada women's national bandy team
- Canada national ringette team
- Keely Brown (goaltender)
- Lyndsay Wheelans
- Julie Blanchette
- Stéphanie Séguin
- Erin Cumpstone
- Jennifer Hartley
