= 2008 Women's Bandy World Championship =

4th Women's Bandy World Championship

Tournament details
- Host country: Sweden
- Venues: 3 (in 3 host cities)
- Dates: 13 – 16 February 2008
- Teams: 7

Final positions
- Champions: Sweden
- Runners-up: Russia
- Third place: Finland
- Fourth place: Norway

Tournament statistics
- Games played: 24
- Goals scored: 152 (6.33 per game)
- Scoring leader: (Sweden) Johanna Pettersson (20 points)

Awards
- MVP: (Sweden) Johanna Pettersson

The 2008 Women's Bandy World Championship took place in Borlänge, Grängesberg and Karlsbyheden, Sweden, from 13 to 16 February. It was the fourth Women's Bandy World Championship. Sweden won the final against Russia 5-2 and became world champions for the fourth time. Finland won the bronze medal match 5–3, against Norway.

== Participating teams ==
- Canada
- Finland
- Hungary
- Norway
- Russia
- Sweden
- United States

== Venues ==
Tunets IP
Host venue
Location	Borlänge, Sweden
Constructed	
Capacity	

[name of arena]
Host venue
Location	Grängesberg, Sweden
Constructed	
Capacity	

[name of arena]
Host venue
Location	Karlsbyheden, Sweden
Constructed	
Capacity	

== Results ==
Date	2008 Bandy World Championship matches	Result
13 February	Finland - Hungary	14 - 0
13 February	Norway - United States	1 - 0
13 February	Sweden - Canada	10 - 1
13 February	Russia - Finland	9 - 1
13 February	Norway - Hungary	7 - 0
13 February	Sweden - United States	13 - 0
13 February	Canada - Russia	1 - 3
14 February	United States - Finland	1 - 5
14 February	Hungary - Sweden	0 - 7
14 February	Canada - Norway	1 - 1
14 February	United States - Russia	0 - 9
14 February	Sweden - Finland	7 - 0
14 February	Hungary - Canada	0 - 7
14 February	Russia - Norway	2 - 0
15 February	Hungary - United States	0 - 4
15 February	Sweden - Russia	6 - 0
15 February	Norway - Finland	1 - 4
15 February	United States - Canada	0 - 0
15 February	Russia - Hungary	8 - 0
15 February	Norway - Sweden	0 - 8
15 February	Finland - Canada	4 - 0

=== Table ===
Pos	Team	Pld	W	D	L	GF	GA	GD	Pts
1	Sweden	6	6	0	0	51	1	+50	12
2	Russia	6	5	0	1	31	8	+23	10
3	Finland	6	4	0	2	28	18	+10	8
4	Norway	6	2	1	3	10	15	−5	5
5	Canada	6	1	2	3	10	18	−8	4
6	United States	6	1	1	4	5	28	−23	3
7	Hungary	6	0	0	6	0	47	−47	0

== Finals ==
Date	Bandy World Championship fifth-place match	Result
16 Feb	Canada - United States	2 - 0

Date	Bandy World Championship Bronze Final	Result
16 Feb	Finland - Norway	5-3

Date	Bandy World Championship Final	Result
16 Feb	Sweden - Russia	5 - 2

== Medals ==
Place	Country
Gold	Sweden
Silver	Russia
Bronze	Finland
4th	Norway
5th	Canada
6th	United States
7th	Hungary

== Tournament awards ==
The following players was named the best in their position in the 2008 tournament:

- MVP: (Sweden) Johanna Pettersson
- Best goalkeeper: (Canada) Amy Clarkson
- Best defender: (Sweden) Anna Lundin
- Best midfielder: (Sweden) Emma Kronberg
- Best forward: (Russia) Tatiana Talalenko
