= 2006 Women's Bandy World Championship =

2nd Women's Bandy World Championship

Tournament details
- Host country: United States
- City: Roseville, Minnesota
- Dates: February 13 – 18, 2006
- Teams: 6

Final positions
- Champions: Sweden
- Runners-up: Russia
- Third place: Norway
- Fourth place: Finland

Tournament statistics
- Games played: 20
- Goals scored: 92 (4.6 per game)

The Bandy World Championship for women 2006, the second bandy world championship tournament for women, was held in Roseville, Minnesota in the United States on February 13–18, 2006. The event was hosted by the American Bandy Association in Roseville, Minnesota. In the final, Sweden defeated Russia 3-1. It also marked the Canadian women's national bandy team's first international appearance.

== Participating nations ==
- Sweden
- Russia
- Norway
- Finland
- United States
- Canada

== Venue ==
Guidant John Rose Minnesota Oval
Host venue
| Location | United States – Roseville, Minnesota |
| Constructed | Opened: December 1993 |
| Capacity | |

== Premier tour ==
- 14 February

Finland – Russia : 0–8
Sweden – (United States) USA : 7–0
Canada – Norway : 0–4
Sweden – Russia : 7–1
Finland – (United States) USA : 2–0

- 15 February

Sweden – Norway : 8–1
Finland – Canada : 3–1
Russia – (United States) USA : 7–0
Norway – Finland : 4–2
Canada – Russia : 0–7

- 16 February

Sweden – Canada : 5–0
(United States) USA – Norway : 1–1
Sweden – Finland : 5–0
Russia – Norway : 1–1
(United States) USA – Canada : 0–1

| Pos | Team | Pld | W | D | L | GF | GA | GD | Pts |
|---|---|---|---|---|---|---|---|---|---|
| 1 | Sweden | 5 | 5 | 0 | 0 | 32 | 2 | +30 | 10 |
| 2 | Russia | 5 | 3 | 1 | 1 | 24 | 8 | +16 | 7 |
| 3 | Norway | 5 | 2 | 2 | 1 | 11 | 12 | −1 | 6 |
| 4 | Finland | 5 | 2 | 0 | 3 | 7 | 18 | −11 | 4 |
| 5 | Canada | 5 | 1 | 0 | 4 | 2 | 19 | −17 | 2 |
| 6 | United States | 5 | 0 | 1 | 4 | 1 | 18 | −17 | 1 |

== Final Tour ==
=== Match for 5th place ===
(United States) USA – Canada : 2–0

=== Semifinals ===
- 17 February

Russia – Norway : 2–0
Sweden – Finland : 4–0

=== Match for 3rd place ===
- 18 February

Norway – Finland : 2–1

=== Final ===
- 18 February

Sweden – Russia : 3–1
