= 2007 Women's Bandy World Championship =

3rd Women's Bandy World Championship
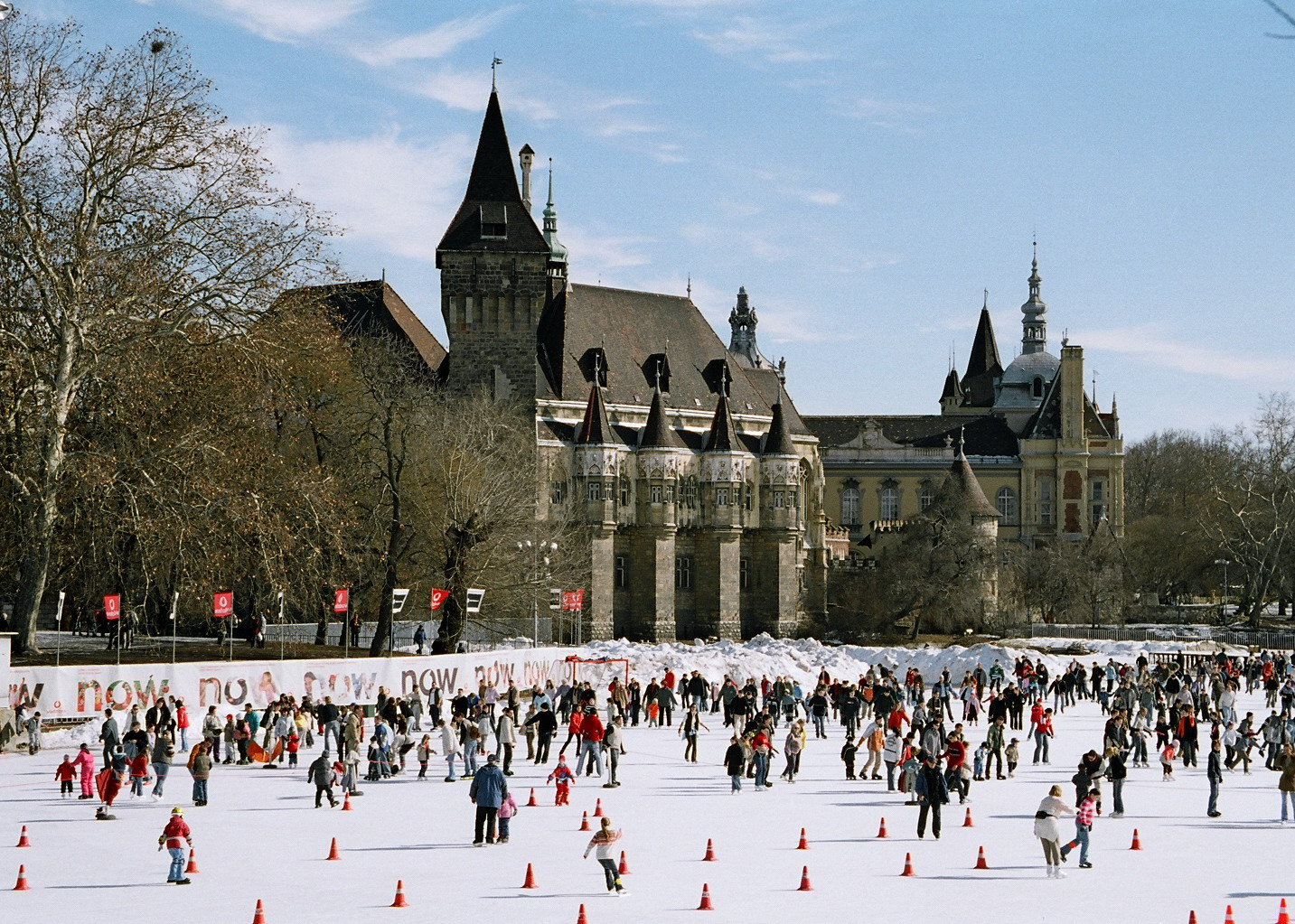
- The tournament venue City Park Ice Rink

Tournament details
- Host country: Hungary
- City: Budapest
- Dates: 11 – 17 February 2007
- Teams: 7

Final positions
- Champions: Sweden
- Runners-up: Russia
- Third place: Norway
- Fourth place: Canada

Tournament statistics
- Games played: 26
- Goals scored: 148 (5.69 per game)

The 2007 Women's Bandy World Championship the third Women's Bandy World Championship and was contested by 7 bandy playing countries. The championship was played in Budapest, Hungary from 11 to 17 February 2007. Sweden defeated Russia, 3–2, in the final.

== Participating nations ==
- Sweden
- Russia
- Norway
- Finland
- United States
- Canada
- Hungary

== Venue ==
City Park Ice Rink
Host venue
Location	Hungary - Budapest
Constructed	Built: 1869; Opened: 1870; Renovated: 1968, 2011
Capacity	

== Premier tour ==
- 11 February

Canada - Hungary 6-0

- 12 February

Russia – Norway 7-1
Finland – USA 5-0
Norway – Canada 4-1
USA - Hungary 10-0
Sweden - Russia 3-3 (Russia won penalty shoot out)

- 13 February

Finland - Canada 2-3
Sweden - Hungary 6-0
Russia - USA 10-0
Sweden - Norway 10-0
Russia - Hungary 8-0

- 14 February

Sweden - USA 0-0 (Sweden won penalty shoot out)
Norway - Finland 2-0
Russia - Canada 3-0
Norway - USA 3-0
Finland - Hungary 4-0

- 15 February

Sweden - Canada 9-0
Russia - Finland 2-0
Norway - Hungary 5-0
Sweden - Finland 7-1
USA - Canada 1-6

Pos	Team	Pld	W	D	L	GF	GA	GD	Pts
1	Russia	6	5	1	0	33	4	+29	11
2	Sweden	6	4	2	0	35	4	+31	10
3	Norway	6	4	0	2	15	18	−3	8
4	Canada	6	3	0	3	16	19	−3	6
5	Finland	6	2	0	4	12	14	−2	4
6	United States	6	1	1	4	11	24	−13	3
7	Hungary	6	0	0	6	0	39	−39	0

== Final Tour ==
=== Semifinals ===
- 16 February

(S1) Russia - Canada 5-0
(S2) Sweden - Norway 7-0

=== Match for 5th place ===
- 16 February

Finland - USA 2-1

=== Match for 3rd place ===
- 16 February

Canada - Norway 3-3 (Norway won penalty shoot out)

=== Final ===
- 17 February

Russia - Sweden 2-3
