= 2012 Women's Bandy World Championship =

6th Women's Bandy World Championship

Tournament details
- Host country: Russia
- City: Irkutsk
- Venue: 1
- Dates: 23 – 26 February 2012
- Teams: 6

Final positions
- Champions: Sweden
- Runners-up: Russia
- Third place: Finland
- Fourth place: Canada

Tournament statistics
- Games played: 20
- Goals scored: 117 (5.85 per game)
- Scoring leader: (Russia) Tatyana Gurinchik (13 points)

The Bandy World Championship for women 2012 was contested by 6 bandy playing countries. The championship was played in Irkutsk, Russia from 23 to 26 February. Sweden defeated Russia, 5-3, in the final-game.

== Participating teams ==
- Canada
- Finland
- Norway
- Russia
- Sweden
- United States

== Venue ==
Russia
Host venue
Location	Russia – Irkutsk
Constructed	
Capacity	

== Preliminary round ==
23 February	Russia	4 – 0	Canada

23 February	Finland	1 – 7	Sweden

23 February	Norway	2 – 1	United States

23 February	Sweden	3 – 2	Russia

23 February	Canada	2 – 1	Norway

23 February	Finland	7 – 0	United States

24 February	Norway	2 – 3	Finland

24 February	Canada	0 – 8	Sweden

24 February	Russia	8 – 0	United States

24 February	Russia	4 – 0	Norway

24 February	Sweden	10 – 0	United States

24 February	Canada	1 – 5	Finland

25 February	Finland	1 – 3	Russia

25 February	Sweden	7 – 0	Norway

25 February	Canada	1 – 0	United States

=== Standings ===
Team	Pld	W	D	L	GF	GA	GD	Pts
Sweden	5	5	0	0	35	3	+32	10
Russia	5	4	0	1	21	4	+17	8
Finland	5	3	0	2	17	13	+4	6
Canada	5	2	0	3	4	18	−14	4
Norway	5	1	0	4	5	17	−12	2
United States	5	0	0	5	1	28	−27	0

== Play Offs ==
=== Semi-finals ===
25 February	Russia	10 – 1	Finland

25 February	Sweden	7 – 0	Canada

=== Match for 5th place ===
26 February	Norway	1 – 2	United States

=== Match for 3rd place ===
26 February	Finland	4 – 1	Canada

=== Final ===
26 February	Russia	3 – 5	Sweden

== Final standing ==
Rank	Team
1st place, gold medalist(s)	Sweden
2nd place, silver medalist(s)	Russia
3rd place, bronze medalist(s)	Finland
4	Canada
5	United States
6	Norway

== Tournament awards ==
The following players was named the best in their position in the 2012 tournament:

- Best goalkeeper: (Sweden) Linda Odén
- Best defender: (Russia) Galina Mikhailov
- Best midfielder: (Finland) Nora Tulus
