= Bandy in the United States =

USA Bandy
- The logo of USA Bandy; ABA = American Bandy Association
- Sport: Bandy
- Founded: 1981; 45 years ago
- Location: Minnesota
- President: ABA: Andrew Knutson
- Vice president: ABA: Chris Middlebrook
- (founded): American Bandy Association

Official website
- usabandy.com
- (United States)
- Recognized as a non-profit corporation in 1983

Bandy in the United States is played mostly in Minnesota, but has started to grow in Nevada as well. The national team regularly plays in Division A of the Bandy World Championships. In terms of licensed athletes, it is the second biggest winter sport in the world. Bandy is a team sport played on ice with ice skates, a ball, and a curved stick on a large sheet of ice called a bandy field. In the United States, the national governing body for bandy is the American Bandy Association (ABA), also called "USA Bandy" which was established in 1981, the same year it became a member of the Federation of International Bandy (FIB). The USA Bandy Hall of Fame is located in Minnesota.

The American Bandy League is played in Minnesota. It is the country's elite-tier of bandy played in the country with the league split into two divisions: Division I and Division II. The winner of the US Premier League wins the Gunnar Cup. The USA Rink Bandy League organizes the bandy variation known as rink bandy. The tournament for rink bandy in the US is the North American Cup.

In international competition, the country has both a men's and a women's national bandy squad: the United States men's national bandy team, and the United States women's national bandy team. The men's United States national bandy team has taken part in the Bandy World Championships since the 1985 tournament. The 1995 Bandy World Championship was played at Guidant John Rose Minnesota Oval. The United States national men's squad also plays friendlies against Canada in the Can-Am Bandy Cup.

The United States women's national bandy team has participated in every one of the Women's Bandy World Championships. The 2006 and the 2016 women's world tournaments were played in Minnesota.

== History ==
In the late 19th century there was a game very similar to bandy called ice polo played in the United States. The first bandy game in the USA was played in December 1979 at the Lewis Park Bandy Rink in Edina, Minnesota. It was a friendly game between the Sweden men's national junior bandy team and Swedish club team Brobergs IF.

== Governing body ==
The logo of USA Bandy

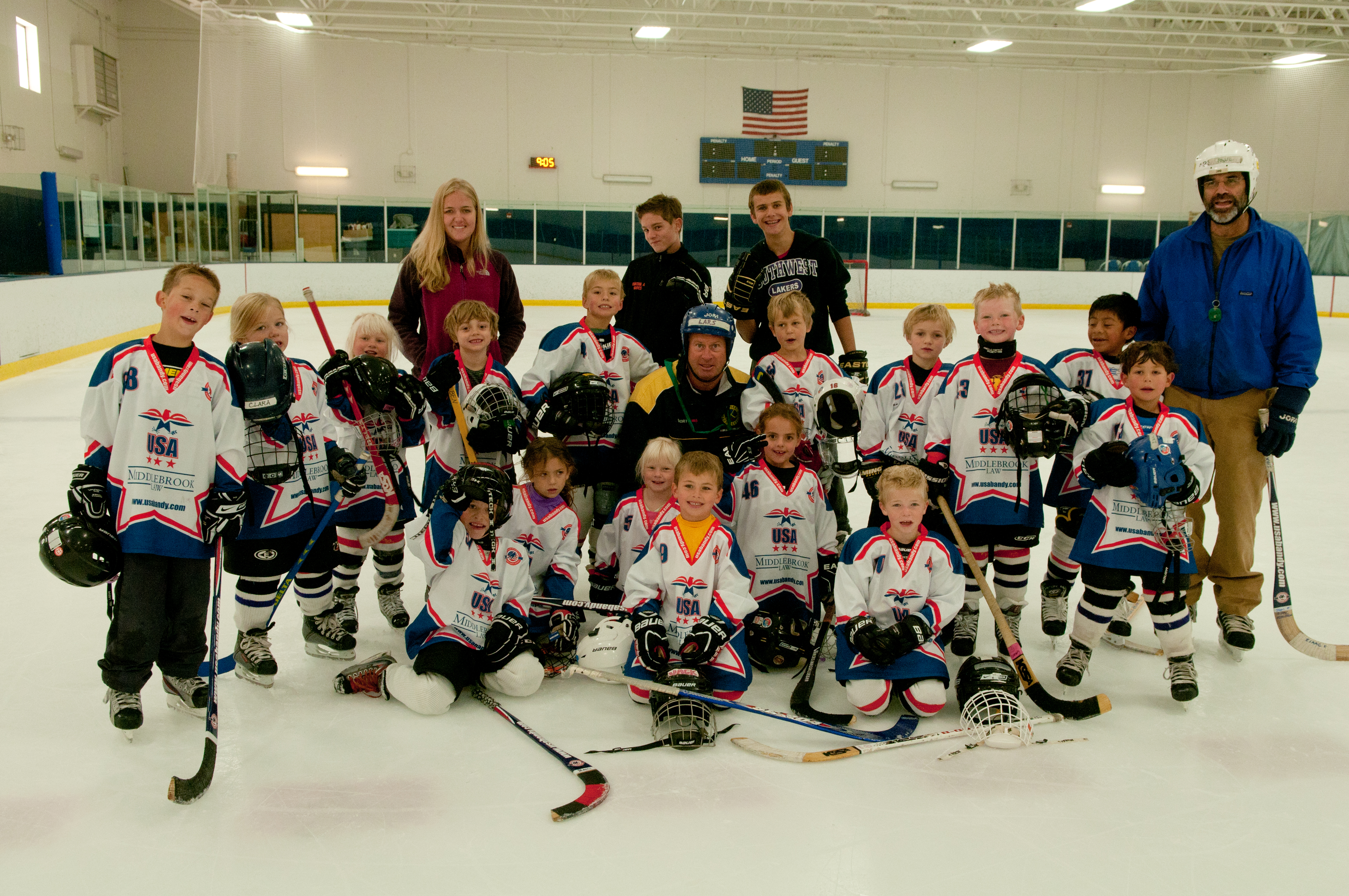
August 2013 summer youth bandy camp in Minnesota.

The American Bandy Association (ABA), also called USA Bandy, is the governing body of bandy in the United States. The association was established and became a member of the Federation of International Bandy in 1981, and was recognized as a non-profit corporation in 1983. It is headquartered in Savage, Minnesota. The president of ABA is Chris Middlebrook, who is also a lawyer by profession. ABA runs the American Bandy League.

The ABA also arranges an international summer camp for children every year. All ABA league games are played at the Guidant John Rose Minnesota Oval in Roseville, Minnesota.

== International competition ==
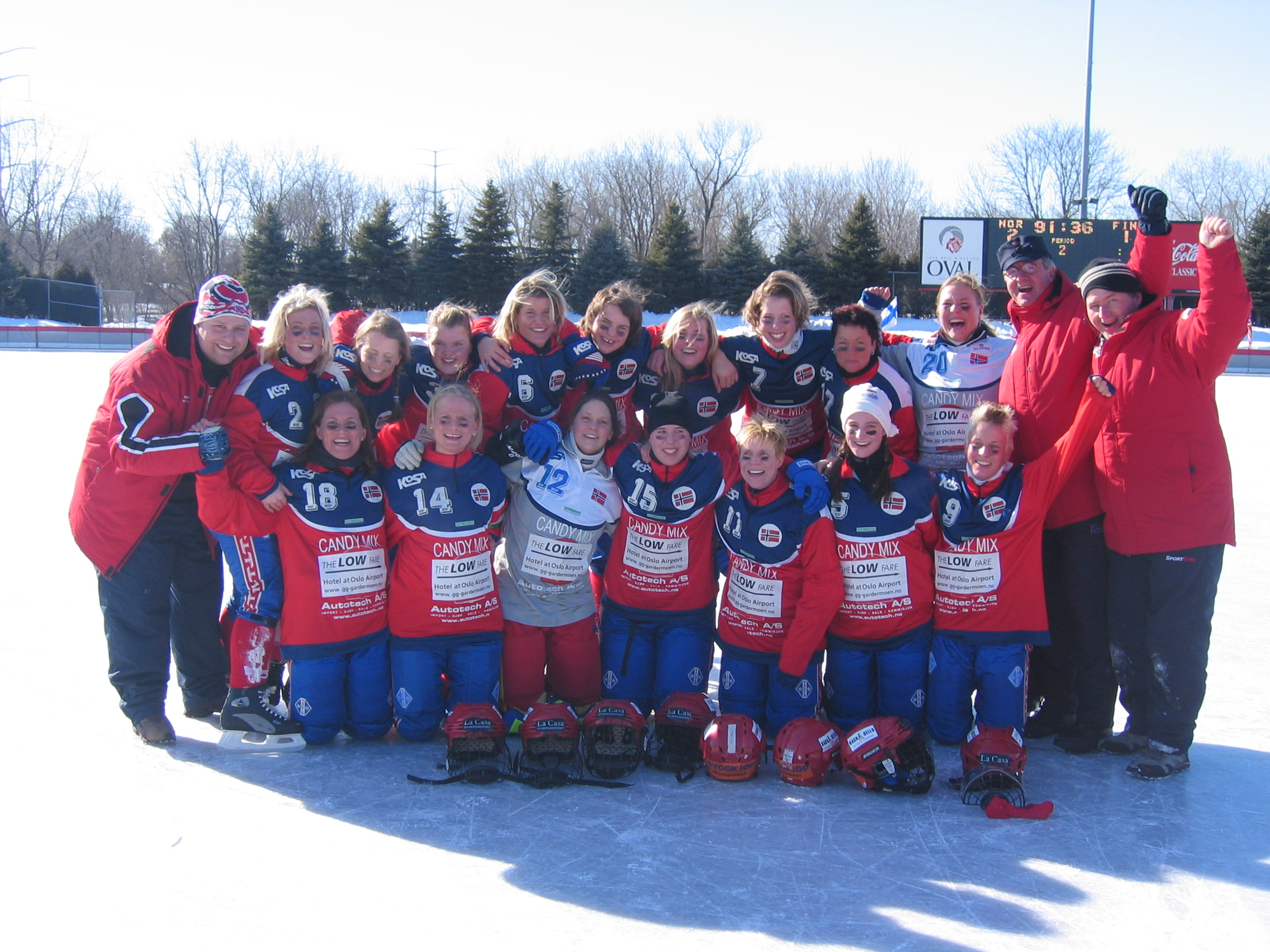
Team Norway celebrating winning the bronze at the 2006 Women's Worlds in Minnesota

The United States is home to the United States men's national bandy team and the United States women's national bandy team. The men compete regularly in the Bandy World Championships while the women compete in the Women's Bandy World Championship.

== League play ==
The American Bandy League is the top-tier of bandy played in the United States. The league is split into two divisions, with 6 teams in Division I and 4 in Division II. All ABA league games are played at the Guidant John Rose Minnesota Oval in Roseville, Minnesota. The variant rink bandy is also played, organised as the USA Rink Bandy League. As of 2017, the latest champion is Tonka Bay Bombers.

== Team highlights ==
=== Dynamo Duluth ===
(Division I)

Dynamo (Duluth, Minnesota) was founded in 2006.

In 2012, Dynamo Duluth finished second in the league and in 2013 they became national champions for the first time. In 2009 they won the North American Cup, which is the tournament for rink bandy in the US. Many of the best players for the team joined the United States men's national bandy team, among them, former ice hockey pro Robb Stauber.

=== Flying Sparrows ===
(Division I)

Initially known as the Dinkytown Dukes, the Sparrows were formed in the 2014-2015 season by General Managers Jon Keseley, John Arundel, and Scott Arundel. In their first season, the Dukes went undefeated in the regular season and claimed their first Gunnar Cup as US Premier League champions by winning the series 2 games to 1 over Mississippi Mojo. Jon Keseley was named the season MVP, while Mikael Lickteig received playoff MVP honors, backstopped by the goaltending of Erik "The Red Baron" Kraska. The Dukes claimed their second championship in 2017. Under their new name, the team is competing against Minneapolis Bandolier for the 40th US Bandy Championship.

=== Minneapolis Bandolier ===
(Division I)

Bandolier (Minneapolis, Minnesota) was founded in 1980. It has won the United States Championship ten times (1981, 1982, 1983, 2001, 2002, 2006, 2009, 2010, 2012, and 2014), more than any other club. Many of the club's players also play in the United States national bandy team.

=== Minnesota Blades ===
(Division I)

The Blades were formed at the beginning of the 2002–2003 bandy season as the successor club to the Stabaek (MN) Bandy Club, which, after enjoying success in the 1980s and 1990s, fell on hard times. After Stabaek finished last in the Premier League table in 2001–2002, the Blades were founded and led by Steve Nelson of Edina, MN (see notable players below) and finished their inaugural season in third place, before losing in the league playoff semifinals to the Amur Tigers.

The Blades have won four US Premier League titles, taking the Gunnar Cup in 2004, 2005, 2008, and 2011. In 2005, the Gunnar Cup, which is traditionally awarded to the playoff champions, was awarded to the Blades by virtue of their first-place regular-season finish, as inclement weather in Minnesota caused the cancellation of that year's post-season tournament. In the 2005–2006 season, the Blades finished 4th in the regular season, and were eliminated from the league playoffs by expansion side OBS.

In both 2005 and 2006, the Blades were the runners-up in the North American Cup competition. The Blades are captained by Steve "Jazz Hands" Nelson; he earned the nickname due to his indelible stick-handling prowess in the 2006 Federation Cup.

=== Mississippi Mojo ===
(Division I)

The Mississippi Mojo (named for the Mississippi River, not the state) was the runner-up for the Gunnar Cup in 2013, 2015, and 2017.

=== TC Ice Tigers ===
(Division I)

=== Team USA ===
(Division I)

=== East Isles ===
(Division II)

=== Elsies Bandy ===
(Division II)

=== Tsunami ICE ===
(Division II)

=== USA Women ===
(Division II)
