= China women's national bandy team =

National sports team

China women's national bandy team represents China in the sport of bandy. It is governed by the China Bandy Federation. It made its World Championship debut in the 2016 tournament in Roseville, Minnesota, United States. It lost all matches without scoring. In the 2018 Championship on home ice in Chengde, China beat the newcomers Estonia and Switzerland. China was scheduled to compete in the 2019 women's world championship in Oslo, Norway, but the team had to withdraw due to the COVID pandemic outbreak.

== Tournament participation ==
=== World Championships ===
| Year | Rank | GP | W | D | L | GS | GA | GD |
|---|---|---|---|---|---|---|---|---|
| (Finland) 2004 to (Finland) 2014 | Did not enter | | | | | | | |
| (United States) 2016 | 7th | 6 | 0 | 0 | 6 | 0 | 52 | -52 |
| (China) 2018 | 6th | 4 | 2 | 0 | 2 | 17 | 17 | 0 |
| (Norway) 2020 | Withdrew due to COVID-19 | | | | | | | |
| (Sweden) 2022 | Withdrew due to COVID-19 | | | | | | | |
| Total | 2/9 | 10 | 2 | 0 | 8 | 17 | 69 | -52 |

== See also ==
- Bandy
- Rink bandy
- Women's Bandy World Championship
  - Great Britain women's national bandy team
  - Sweden women's national bandy team
  - Russia women's national bandy team
  - Finland women's national bandy team
  - Norway women's national bandy team
  - Switzerland women's national bandy team
  - United States women's national bandy team
  - Canada women's national bandy team
  - Hungary women's national bandy team
  - Soviet Union women's national bandy team
