= 2010 Women's Bandy World Championship =

5th Women's Bandy World Championship

Tournament details
- Host country: Norway
- City: Drammen
- Dates: 24 – 27 February 2010
- Teams: 6

Final positions
- Champions: Sweden
- Runners-up: Russia
- Third place: Norway
- Fourth place: Canada

Tournament statistics
- Games played: 18
- Goals scored: 95 (5.28 per game)
- Scoring leader: (Sweden) Johanna Pettersson (9 points)

Awards
- MVP: (Sweden) Johanna Pettersson

The Bandy World Championship for women 2010 was contested by 6 bandy playing countries. The championship was played in Drammen, Norway from 24 to 27 February. Sweden defeated Russia, 3-2 following overtime, in the final game.

== Participating teams ==
- Canada
- Finland
- Norway
- Russia
- Sweden
- United States

== Venue ==
Norway
Host venue
Location	Norway – Drammen
Constructed	
Capacity	

== Preliminary round ==
24 February	Sweden	8 – 0	Canada

24 February	Norway	4 – 0	United States

24 February	Russia	2 – 1	Finland

24 February	Sweden	11 – 0	United States

24 February	Norway	2 – 1	Canada

25 February	Finland	1 – 2	Canada

25 February	Russia	5 – 0	United States

25 February	Finland	5 – 2	Norway

25 February	Sweden	1 – 1	Russia

25 February	United States	0 – 1	Canada

26 February	Norway	1 – 1	Russia

26 February	Sweden	7 – 1	Finland

26 February	Russia	8 – 0	Canada

26 February	United States	2 – 3	Finland

26 February	Norway	0 – 10	Sweden

=== Standings ===
Team	Pld	W	D	L	GF	GA	GD	Pts
Sweden	5	4	1	0	37	2	+35	9
Russia	5	3	2	0	17	3	+14	8
Norway	5	2	1	2	9	17	−8	5
Canada	5	2	0	3	4	19	−15	4
Finland	5	2	0	3	11	15	−4	4
United States	5	0	0	5	2	24	−22	0

== Play Offs ==
=== Match for 5th place ===
27 February	Finland	4 – 1	United States

=== Match for 3rd place ===
27 February	Norway	3 – 2	Canada

=== Final ===
27 February	Russia	2 – 3	Sweden

== Final standing ==
Rank	Team
1st place, gold medalist(s)	Sweden
2nd place, silver medalist(s)	Russia
3rd place, bronze medalist(s)	Norway
4	Canada
5	Finland
6	United States

== Tournament awards ==
The following players was named the best in their position in the 2010 tournament:

- MVP: (Sweden) Johanna Pettersson
- Best goalkeeper: (Sweden) Linda Odén
- Best defender: (Russia) Galina Mikhailova
- Best midfielder: (Russia) Tatyana Gurinchik
