= Guidant John Rose Minnesota Oval =

Ice rink in Roseville, Minnesota

Coordinates: 45°01′18″N 93°09′05″W

John Rose Minnesota Oval
- Interactive map of John Rose Minnesota Oval
- Location: Roseville, Minnesota, United States
- Type: outdoor bandy rink

Construction
- Opened: December 1993

The Guidant John Rose Minnesota Oval (officially stylized as OVAL), formerly the John Rose Minnesota Oval, is an outdoor ice rink in Roseville, Minnesota, United States. It is claimed to be the largest artificial outdoor skating surface in North America. The facility was constructed from June to December 1993. It was the subject of a $3.9 million renovation project which was set to be completed before the opening of the rink's 29th season on November 18, 2022. It is the home of bandy in the United States and is used by the United States men's national bandy team and the United States women's national bandy team.

== Rink ==
The rink consists of a 110,000-square-foot (10,000 m^{2}) concrete surface (a 400-meter track surrounding an infield ice arena) with 84 miles (135 km) of embedded cooling tubes and an 800-ton refrigeration system. When the temperature is above 50 °F (10 °C)—the highest temperature at which an icy surface can be maintained—the concrete surface can be used for inline skating.

== History ==
The Oval had its beginnings in 1983, when then-governor Rudy Perpich dreamed of hosting the Olympic Games. As part of the bid preparation, a task force was formed to determine locations of new facilities. After years of local efforts, Roseville was selected. The city was awarded state bonding money for the design and construction of a multi-purpose outdoor skating facility, which opened in December 1993. The facility was named after John Rose, a Roseville teacher, member of the Minnesota House of Representatives, and avid supporter of youth sports.

The Guidant John Rose Minnesota Oval hosted the 1995 Bandy World Championship for men and the 2006 Women's Bandy World Championship. It has also hosted US Speedskating Championships, US Junior Speedskating Championships, American Cup Speedskating, World Cup Speedskating, National Bandy Championships, and Aggressive Skating Association competitions. The Minnesota Wild held their hockey jersey unveiling at the Oval, and notable visitors have included Dan Jansen, Bonnie Blair, Paul Wylie, and Neal Broten. The facility is the main training site for the United States national bandy team and local hockey and speedskating clubs.

Leaks in the cooling system were discovered in 2004, making the season's service uncertain. In June 2005, the Guidant Foundation contributed $500,000 to allow for needed repairs to the facility's refrigeration system. The Oval's official name was changed in recognition of the Foundation's gift and continuing support.

== Events ==
The Oval hosts over 100,000 guests each year. Sporting events held there include bandy, ice hockey, speed skating, and recreational ice skating. In summer the Oval becomes the largest skating park in the Midwest, as ramps are put up for BMX biking, roller hockey, and aggressive skating. The track is used for inline skating, and a summer skateboard camp is held for beginning to intermediate skateboarders aged 6–13.

I.S.I.-certified ice skating lessons are given by Roseville Skating School in the connected Roseville Ice Arena during the winter months. The Oval also hosts two local speedskating clubs: the Greater Minnesota Speedskating Association and the Midway Speedskating Club. Midway Speedskating Club is a non-profit organization dedicated to developing speedskating skills in young skaters. It has produced Olympic athletes and coaches. A novice speedskating program is put on by the Midway Speedskating Club through the Roseville Parks and Recreation Department for youth aged 4–14.

February 25–27, 2015, the Bandy World Championship for girls up to 17 was organised here.

Events and tenants
| Preceded by Vikingskipet; Hamar | Bandy World Championship; Final Venue; 1995 | Succeeded by Rocklunda IP; Västerås |
| Preceded by High Mountain Altitude Rink; Butte | World Junior Speed Skating Championships; 1998 | Succeeded by Furumo stadium Geithus |
| Preceded by Yanagimachi Speed Skating Rink; Kushiro | World Junior Speed Skating Championships; 2004 | Succeeded by Jääurheilukeskus; Seinäjoki |
| Preceded by 2014 Women's Bandy World Championship; Lappeenranta, Finland | 2016 Women's Bandy World Championship; 2016 | Succeeded by 2018 Women's Bandy World Championship; Chengde, China |
