= Soviet Union women's national bandy team =

Women's national sports team

Soviet Union women's national bandy team represented the former Soviet Union in the sport of bandy. It was governed by the Bandy and Field Hockey Federation of the USSR.

The Soviet women did not form a national team until around 1990. In 1990 and 1991 they were in Sweden playing the Swedish women's team.

== See also ==
- Bandy
- Rink bandy
- Women's Bandy World Championship
  - Great Britain women's national bandy team
  - Sweden women's national bandy team
  - Russia women's national bandy team
  - Finland women's national bandy team
  - Norway women's national bandy team
  - Switzerland women's national bandy team
  - China women's national bandy team
  - Canada women's national bandy team
  - Hungary women's national bandy team
  - United States women's national bandy team
