= List of United States bandy champions =

United States bandy champions are the winners of the annual play-offs following the regular league of the Division I in the American Bandy League, the top league for bandy in the United States. The championship trophy is called the Gunnar Cup, named for Gunnar Fast, a Swedish army captain who introduced bandy to the United States around 1980.

== Winners through the years ==
Winners since 1981. The championship is usually decided in a play-off at the end of the regular season, but some years the league winner has been named champion instead.

Year	Champion	Runner-up	Note
1981	Minneapolis Bandolier		
1982	Minneapolis Bandolier		
1983	Minneapolis Bandolier		
1984	Bagheera Blades		
1985	Bagheera Blades		
1986	Jesco		
1987	Slice on Ice		
1988	Slice on Ice		
1989	TC Rats		
1990	Minnesota Reindeer		
1991	Minnesota Reindeer		
1992	Parkwood		
1993	Minnesota Reindeer		
1994	Minnetonka Dynamo		
1995	Minnesota Reindeer		
1996	Sirius Minnesota		
1997	Sirius Minnesota		
1998	Minnetonka Dynamo		
1999	Amur Tigers		
2000	Minnetonka Dynamo		
2001	Minneapolis Bandolier		
2002	Minneapolis Bandolier		
2003	Amur Tigers		
2004	Minnesota Blades	Minneapolis Bandolier	
2005	Minnesota Blades		
2006	Minneapolis Bandolier	Amur Tigers	
2007	Sirius Minnesota	Minnesota Blades	
2008	Minnesota Blades	Amur Tigers	
2009	Minneapolis Bandolier	Minnesota Blades	
2010	Minneapolis Bandolier	Minnesota Blades	
2011	Minnesota Blades	Minneapolis Bandolier	
2012	Minneapolis Bandolier	Dynamo Duluth	
2013	Dynamo Duluth	Mississippi Mojo	
2014	Minneapolis Bandolier	Minnesota Blades	
2015	Dinkytown Dukes	Mississippi Mojo	
2016	Minneapolis Bandolier	Minnesota Blades	
2017	Dinkytown Dukes	Mississippi Mojo	
2018	Mississippi Mojo	Tonka Bay Bombers	
2019	Tonka Bay Bombers	Mississippi Mojo	
2020			
2021	Mississippi Mojo		
2022	Mississippi Mojo	Flying Sparrows	
2023	Tonka Bay Bombers	Mississippi Mojo	
2024	Tonka Bay Bombers	Mississippi Mojo	
