= Bandy World Cup Women =

Annual mid-October women's bandy tournament in northern Sweden

Bandy World Cup for Women
- Status: Active
- Genre: Sporting event
- Date: Mid-October
- Frequency: Annual
- Country: Sweden
- Inaugurated: 2003

Bandy World Cup Women is an annual bandy competition for the best women's club teams from around the world hosted in Sweden. Inaugurated in 2003, the competition was named to correspond to the Bandy World Cup for men's club teams.

== Participation ==
In 2015, Canada sent to the tournament a Winnipeg-based girls high school ice hockey team which had learned to play bandy.

== Winners ==
Year	Winner	Source
2003	(Sweden) AIK	
2004	(Sweden) AIK	
2005	(Sweden) Sandvikens AIK	
2006	(Sweden) Sandvikens AIK	
2007	(Sweden) Sandvikens AIK	
2008	(Sweden) AIK	
2009	(Russia) Rekord Irkutsk	
2010	(Sweden) AIK	
2011	(Sweden) AIK	
2012	(Russia) Rekord Irkutsk	
2013	(Sweden) Kareby IS	
2014	(Sweden) Kareby IS	
2015	(Sweden) Kareby IS	
2016	(Russia) Rekord Irkutsk	
2017	(Sweden) Kareby IS	
2018	(Russia) Rekord Irkutsk	
2019	(Sweden) Västerås SK	
