= 2014 Women's Bandy World Championship =

2014 edition of the Women's Bandy World Championship

7th Women's Bandy World Championship

Tournament details
- Host country: Finland
- City: Lappeenranta
- Venue: 1
- Dates: 19 – 22 February 2014
- Teams: 6

Final positions
- Champions: Russia
- Runners-up: Sweden
- Third place: Finland
- Fourth place: Norway

Tournament statistics
- Games played: 20
- Goals scored: 94 (4.7 per game)
- Scoring leader: (Russia) Tatyana Gurinchik (12 points)

The Bandy World Championship for women 2014 was contested among 6 bandy playing countries. The championship was played in Lappeenranta, Finland from 19 to 22 February.

Russia won the tournament, defeating Sweden 5–3 in the final-game.

England planned to participate, but was eventually not scheduled to appear.

== Participating teams ==
- Canada
- Finland
- Norway
- Russia
- Sweden
- United States

== Venue ==
Finland
Host venue
Location	Finland – Lappeenranta
Constructed	
Capacity	

== Group stage ==
=== Wednesday 19 February 2014 ===
Local time (EET)	Team 1	Result	Team 2
08:30	Sweden	5 – 0	United States
10:30	Finland	3 – 2	Canada
12:30	Russia	1 – 0	Norway
15:00	Canada	1 – 0	United States
17:00	Norway	0 – 6	Sweden
19:00	Russia	5 – 1	Finland

=== Thursday 20 February 2014 ===
Local time (EET)	Team 1	Result	Team 2
08:30	Russia	13 – 0	United States
10:30	Sweden	3 – 1	Canada
12:30	Norway	1 – 5	Finland
15:00	Russia	5 – 0	Canada
17:00	United States	1 – 1	Norway
19:00	Finland	0 – 3	Sweden

=== Friday 21 February 2014 ===
Local time (EET)	Team 1	Result	Team 2
08:30	Canada	0 – 2	Norway
10:30	United States	3 – 3	Finland
12:30	Sweden	1 – 3	Russia

=== Standings ===
Team	Pld	W	D	L	GF	GA	GD	Pts
Russia	5	5	0	0	27	2	+25	10
Sweden	5	4	0	1	18	4	+14	8
Finland	5	2	1	2	12	14	−2	5
Norway	5	1	1	3	4	13	−9	3
Canada	5	1	0	4	4	13	−9	2
United States	5	0	2	3	4	23	−19	2

== Play Offs ==
=== Semi-finals, Friday 21 February 2014 ===
17:00 EET	Russia	6 – 1	Norway

19:00 EET	Sweden	4 – 2	Finland

=== Match for 5th place, Saturday 22 February 2014 ===
09:00 EET	Canada	2 – 1	United States

=== Match for 3rd place, Saturday 22 February 2014 ===
10:30 EET	Finland	3 – 2	Norway

=== Final, Saturday 22 February 2014 ===
14:00 EET	Russia	3 – 1	Sweden

== Final standing ==
Rank	Team
1st place, gold medalist(s)	Russia
2nd place, silver medalist(s)	Sweden
3rd place, bronze medalist(s)	Finland
4	Norway
5	Canada
6	United States
