= Hungary women's national bandy team =

National sports team

Hungary women's national bandy team competes for Hungary in international bandy tournaments.

The team has so far only made appearances in two world championship tournaments, in 2007 (as the host country) and 2008 (in Sweden). It has lost all its matches without scoring.

== See also ==
- Bandy
- Rink bandy
- Women's Bandy World Championship
  - Great Britain women's national bandy team
  - Sweden women's national bandy team
  - Russia women's national bandy team
  - Finland women's national bandy team
  - Norway women's national bandy team
  - Switzerland women's national bandy team
  - China women's national bandy team
  - Canada women's national bandy team
  - United States women's national bandy team
  - Soviet Union women's national bandy team
