= Jesper Ericsson =

Swedish bandy player (born 1983)

Jesper Ericsson (born 20 September 1983) is a Swedish bandy player who currently plays for Hammarby IF Bandy as a midfielder. Ericsson was brought up by Örebro SK but left the club when Hammarby spotted him. Ericsson has represented both the Swedish national bandy team and the 'young' Swedish side.

Before the 2008 season, Ericsson signed for Russian team Uralsky Trubnik on loan. After Uralskys financial problems in winter of 2008, he together with teamfellows Robin Sundin and Kalle Spjuth, returned to their former club Hammarby. He stayed with Hammarby until the conclusion of the 2011/12 season. At that point Ericsson transferred to play with Villa Lidköping BK, which won their first world club title in 2018, with his assistance.

Ericsson has played for four clubs. His list of clubs is as follows-

(Sweden) Örebro SK (2001–2002)
(Sweden) Hammarby IF (2002-2012)
(Russia) Uralsky Trubnik (2008 loan)
(Sweden) Villa Lidköping BK (2012 to date)
