= Switzerland women's national bandy team =

National sports team

Switzerland women's national bandy team represents Switzerland in international bandy tournaments. It is controlled by the Federation of Swiss Bandy and made its debut at the 2018 Women's Bandy World Championship.

== See also ==
- Bandy
- Rink bandy
- Women's Bandy World Championship
  - Great Britain women's national bandy team
  - Sweden women's national bandy team
  - Russia women's national bandy team
  - Finland women's national bandy team
  - Norway women's national bandy team
  - United States women's national bandy team
  - China women's national bandy team
  - Canada women's national bandy team
  - Hungary women's national bandy team
  - Soviet Union women's national bandy team
