= Finland women's national bandy team =

Finland women's national bandy team Suomen naisten jääpallomaajoukkue (Finnish) Finlands damlandslag i bandy (Swedish)
- The Coat of arms of Finland is the badge used on player jerseys.
- Association: Finnish Bandy Association
- Head coach: Topi Rytkönen
- Most games: Pirjo Ahonen (63)

First international
- Finland 3 – 14 Sweden (Kemi, Finland; 1980)

Biggest win
- Finland 27 – 0 Switzerland (Chengde, China; 2018)

World Championship
- Appearances: 10 (first in 2004)
- Best result: (silver) Silver (2023)

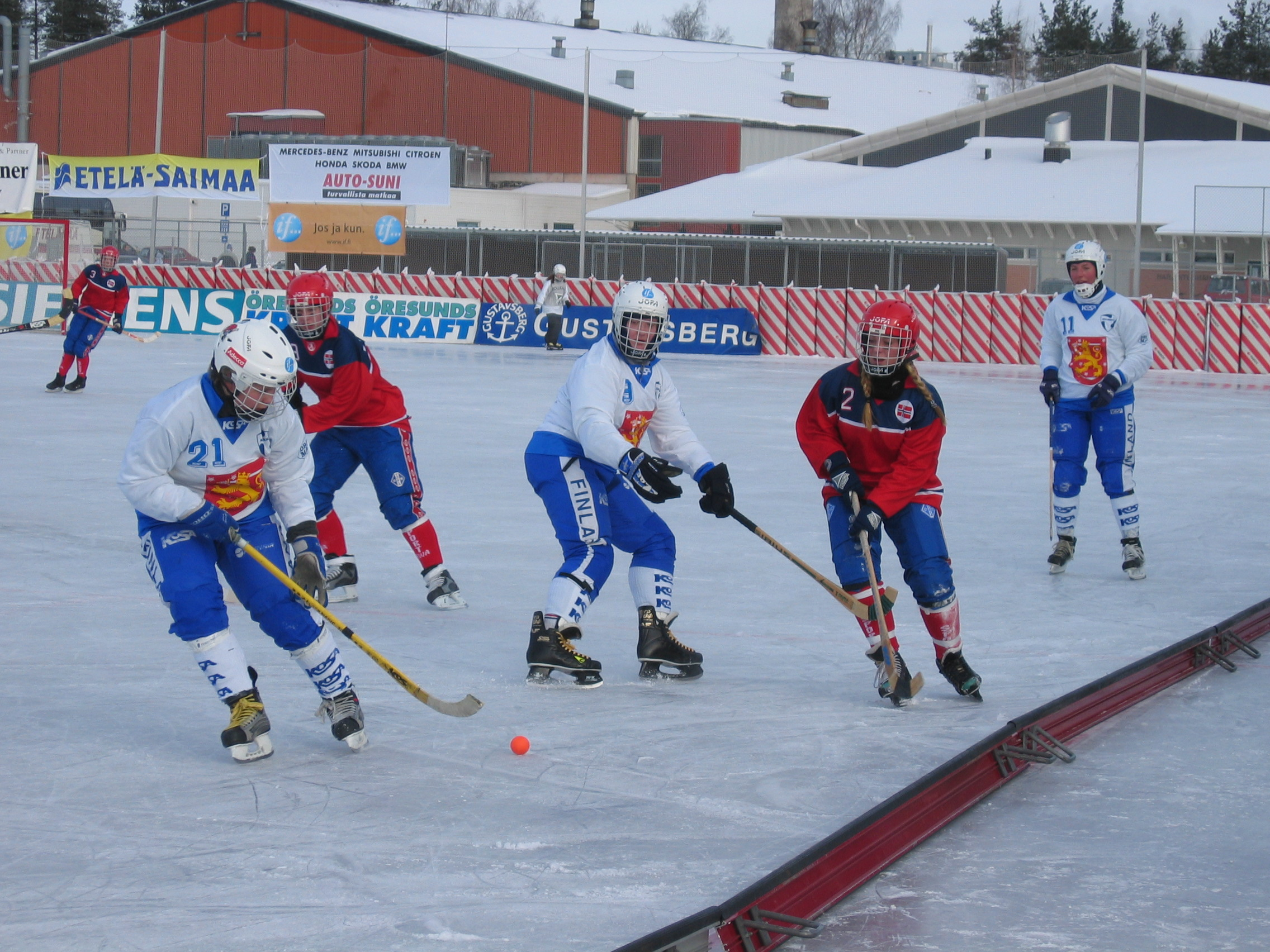
A bandy international between Finland and Norway in the 2004 Women's World Championship in Lappeenranta

The Finland women's national bandy team (Finnish: Suomen naisten jääpallomaajoukkue, Swedish: Finlands damlandslag i bandy) represents Finland in the Women's Bandy World Championship and other international bandy competitions. It is governed by the Finnish Bandy Association, a member of the Federation of International Bandy (FIB).

== History ==
The first recorded international match between women's bandy teams from Sweden and Finland took place in Helsinki, Finland in 1935 at the Helsingfors Ice Stadium, where a portion of the match was captured by British Pathé.

The next documented international friendly match played by the Finnish national team was held in Kemi in 1980 and ended in a Swedish victory, with a final score of 3–14.

== Women's Bandy World Championship ==
The team has participated in every edition of Women's Bandy World Championship since the first tournament in 2004, which was hosted by Finland in the southeastern city of Lappeenranta. Ten years later, Finland hosted the 2014 Women's Bandy World Championship and Lappeenranta once again served as the host city. As of 2026, the team has won five bronze medals, in 2004, 2008, 2012, 2014, and 2022, and one silver medal in 2023, which was their best result at the Women's Bandy World Championship to date.

== Tournament record ==
=== World Championship ===
- 2004 – (bronze) Won Bronze Medal
- 2006 – Finished in 4th place
- 2007 – Finished in 5th place
- 2008 – (bronze) Won Bronze Medal
- 2010 – Finished in 5th place
- 2012 – (bronze) Won Bronze Medal
- 2014 – (bronze) Won Bronze Medal
- 2016 – Finished in 6th place
- 2018 – Finished in 4th place
- 2020 – Finished in 4th place
- 2022 – (bronze) Won Bronze Medal
- 2023 – (silver) Won Silver Medal
- 2025 – Finished in 4th place
- 2026 – Finished in 4th place

== See also ==
- Bandy
- Rink bandy
- Women's Bandy World Championship
  - Great Britain women's national bandy team
  - Sweden women's national bandy team
  - Russia women's national bandy team
  - United States women's national bandy team
  - Norway women's national bandy team
  - Switzerland women's national bandy team
  - China women's national bandy team
  - Canada women's national bandy team
  - Hungary women's national bandy team
  - Soviet Union women's national bandy team
