= 2004 Women's Bandy World Championship =

1st Women's Bandy World Championship
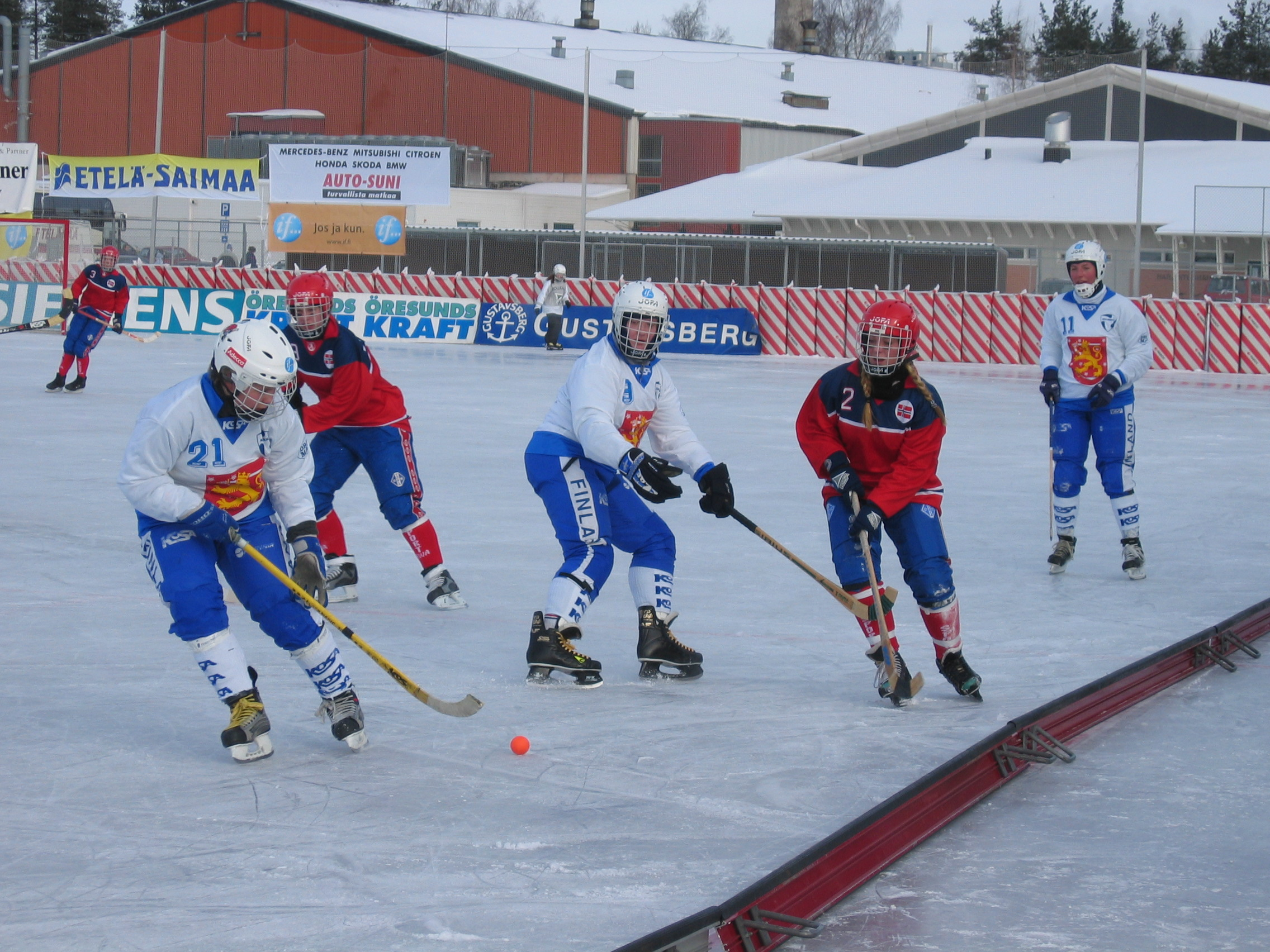
- Finland beat Norway by 12-1 in the 2004 Women's Bandy World Championship

Tournament details
- Host country: Finland
- City: Lappeenranta
- Dates: 18 – 22 February 2004
- Teams: 5

Final positions
- Champions: Sweden
- Runners-up: Russia
- Third place: Finland
- Fourth place: Norway

Tournament statistics
- Games played: 14
- Goals scored: 127 (9.07 per game)

The Bandy World Championship for women 2004 took place in Lappeenranta, Finland between 18 and 22 February. It was the first World Championship in bandy for women and is officially called the "Women's Bandy World Championship" by English speakers.

The five participating teams initially played a group series, where all teams played each other once. The four best teams progressed to the semi-finals. All matches were 2x30 minutes, apart from the final, which was 2 x 45 minutes. Sweden became world champions, winning their six matches a total of 52–0. In the final-game Sweden defeated Russia, 7–0.

== Participating teams ==
- Finland
- Norway
- Russia
- Sweden
- United States

== Venue ==
Finland
Host venue
Finland and Norway in the 2004 Women's World Championship in Lappeenranta
Location	Finland - Lappeenranta
Constructed	
Capacity	

== Results ==
Date	Matches	Result
18 February	Sweden - Russia	9 - 0
18 February	Finland - United States	9 - 1
19 February	Sweden - United States	8 - 0
19 February	Sweden - Finland	6 - 0
19 February	Finland - Norway	12 - 1
19 February	Norway - Russia	0 - 9
20 February	Russia - United States	9 - 1
20 February	Finland - Russia	3 - 4
20 February	Norway - United States	5 - 1
20 February	Sweden - Norway	5 - 0

== Table ==
Pos	Team	Pld	W	D	L	GF	GA	GD	Pts
1	Sweden	4	4	0	0	28	0	+28	8
2	Russia	4	3	0	1	22	13	+9	6
3	Finland	4	2	0	2	24	12	+12	4
4	Norway	4	1	0	3	6	27	−21	2
5	United States	4	0	0	4	3	31	−28	0

== Semi-finals ==
Date	Bandy World Championships semi-finals	Result
21 February	Finland - Russia	5 - 6
21 February	Sweden - Norway	17 - 0

== Finals ==
Date	2004 Bandy World Championships Bronze Final	Result
22 February	Finland - Norway	8 - 1

Date	2004 Bandy World Championships Final	Result
22 February	Sweden - Russia	7 - 0

== Medals ==
Place	Country
Gold	Sweden
Silver	Russia
Bronze	Finland
4th	Norway
5th	United States
