= Grängesberg =

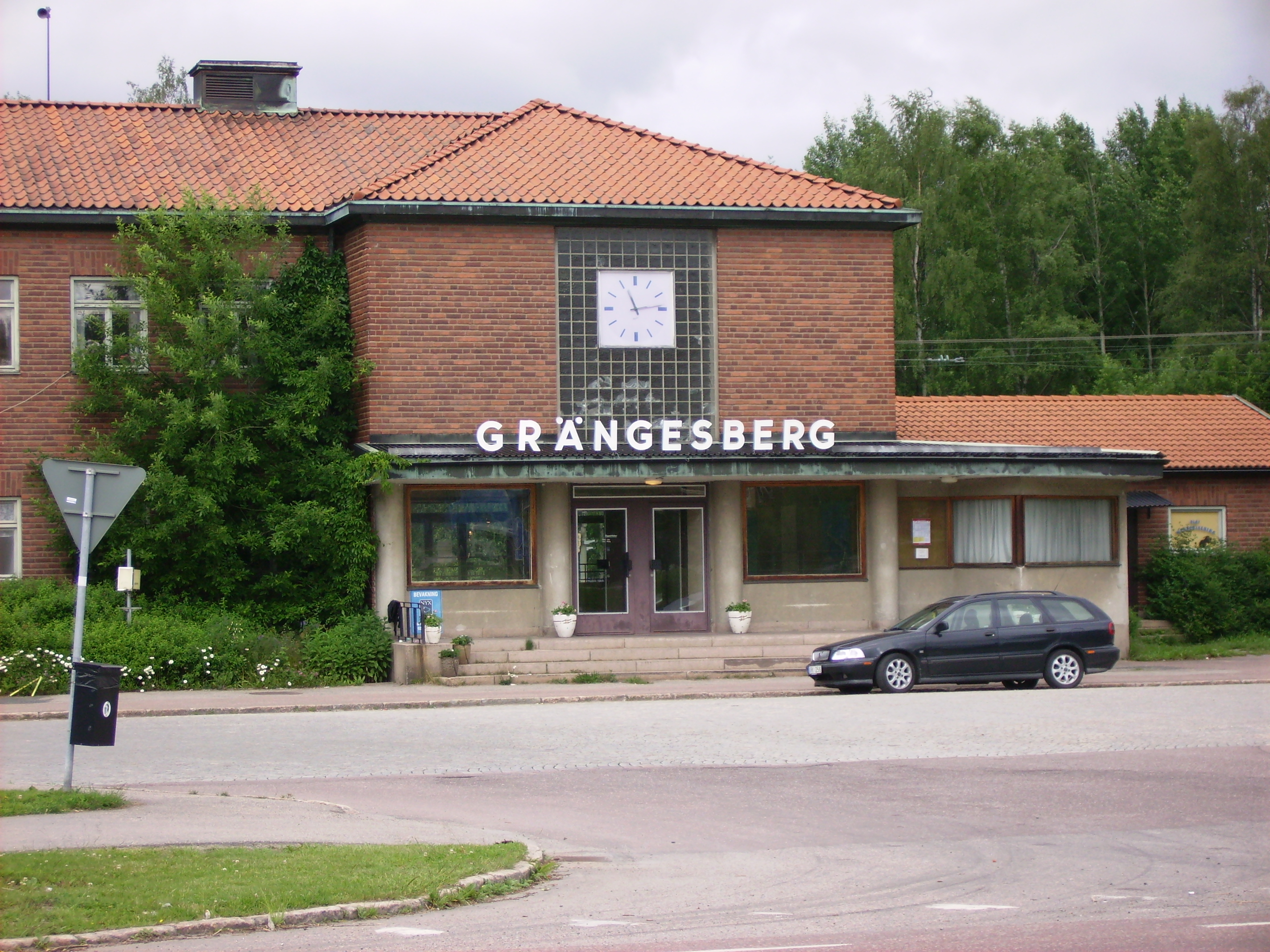
- Grängesberg train station

- Location within Dalarna Location within Sweden
- Coordinates: 60°05′N 14°59′E
- Country: Sweden
- Province: Dalarna
- County: Dalarna County
- Municipality: Ludvika Municipality

Area
  - Total: 7.72 km^{2} (2.98 sq mi)

Population (31 December 2010)
  - Total: 3,481
  - Density: 451/km^{2} (1,170/sq mi)
- Time zone: UTC+1 (CET)
  - Summer (DST): UTC+2 (CEST)

Grängesberg (Swedish pronunciation: [ˈɡrɛ̂ŋːɛsˌbærj]) is a locality situated in Ludvika Municipality, Dalarna County, Sweden, with 3,481 inhabitants in 2010.

The town was dominated by iron-ore extraction at Grängesberg ore field (Grängesbergs malmfält) from the 16th century to 1989. In January 1990 was the last ore-train from Grängesberg to Oxelösund.

Attempts to separate apatite from the ore begun in 1928 but were more clearly successful from the late 1930s to 1953. Aparite was separated by "soap flotation" (Swedish: tvålflotation).

Grängesbergsbolaget had during a long period the world's largest iron-ore fleet and by 1899–1900 was it Sweden's most profitable company. During this time Grängesberg grew very fast, and during a 10-year period the town's population increased threefold. Today Spendrups is Grängesberg's biggest employer.

The area is known for its Railway Museum of Grängesberg.

It is the birthplace of Erik Lundqvist, a javelin thrower, the first person to break the 70-metre (230 ft) barrier by 1 m (3 1/4 ft).

== Riksdag elections ==
| Year | % | Votes | V | S | MP | C | L | KD | M | SD | NyD | Left | Right |
|---|---|---|---|---|---|---|---|---|---|---|---|---|---|
| 1973 | 86.1 | 3,633 | 14.8 | 63.4 | | 12.8 | 3.7 | 0.5 | 4.1 | | | 78.3 | 20.6 |
| 1976 | 87.9 | 3,788 | 12.2 | 65.8 | | 11.9 | 4.4 | 0.6 | 4.7 | | | 78.0 | 20.9 |
| 1979 | 86.8 | 3,553 | 12.7 | 68.8 | | 7.4 | 3.6 | 0.4 | 6.1 | | | 81.5 | 17.1 |
| 1982 | 91.2 | 3,583 | 12.9 | 70.4 | 1.2 | 7.2 | 1.5 | 0.4 | 6.1 | | | 83.3 | 14.8 |
| 1985 | 89.0 | 3,363 | 13.2 | 69.9 | 1.4 | 4.2 | 5.5 | | 5.7 | | | 83.1 | 15.4 |
| 1988 | 84.7 | 3,073 | 13.2 | 68.5 | 3.5 | 4.2 | 5.0 | 1.2 | 4.2 | | | 85.2 | 13.4 |
| 1991 | 84.3 | 3,025 | 9.6 | 65.8 | 1.6 | 3.4 | 3.7 | 2.9 | 6.3 | | 5.7 | 75.4 | 16.4 |
| 1994 | 85.4 | 2,885 | 12.6 | 69.0 | 3.5 | 2.6 | 2.2 | 1.1 | 6.4 | | 1.6 | 85.2 | 12.3 |
| 1998 | 78.9 | 2,413 | 26.9 | 55.0 | 2.4 | 1.1 | 0.8 | 5.3 | 6.8 | | | 84.3 | 14.0 |
| 2002 | 76.3 | 2,230 | 17.5 | 63.2 | 3.2 | 2.0 | 2.4 | 2.3 | 4.8 | 1.6 | | 83.9 | 14.0 |
| 2006 | 77.9 | 2,187 | 14.0 | 59.7 | 2.2 | 2.8 | 1.9 | 2.4 | 9.9 | 4.0 | | 75.9 | 17.0 |
| 2010 | 78.7 | 2,262 | 11.2 | 52.5 | 3.1 | 2.2 | 2.4 | 1.8 | 15.1 | 10.4 | | 66.9 | 21.5 |
| 2014 | 83.8 | 2,377 | 9.3 | 46.8 | 2.4 | 1.6 | 1.5 | 1.6 | 8.7 | 26.7 | | 58.6 | 13.3 |
| 2018 | 83.6 | 2,352 | 10.9 | 33.9 | 0.9 | 3.5 | 2.3 | 3.1 | 8.8 | 34.8 | | 49.2 | 48.9 |
| 2022 | | | 9.5 | 30.0 | 0.6 | 2.0 | 1.4 | 6.6 | 8.7 | 40.0 | | 42.0 | 56.7 |
