= Sweden women's national bandy team =

- Association: Swedish Bandy Association (Svenska bandyförbundet)
- Head coach: (Sweden)
- Team colors
Home colours	Away colours

First international
- Sweden 1 – 4 Finland; Helsinki, Finland, Helsingfors Ice Stadium; 1935

Women's Bandy World Championship
- Appearances: All (first in 2004)

Sweden women's national bandy team represent Sweden in the Women's Bandy World Championship in the winter team sport of bandy. The team is controlled by the Swedish Bandy Association. Sweden won the first ever bandy world championship for women in 2004.

== History ==
The first recorded international match between women's bandy teams from Sweden and Finland took place in Helsinki, Finland in 1935 at the Helsingfors Ice Stadium, where a portion of the match was captured by British Pathé. Another international friendly between women's national teams was played in Kemi in 1980, where Sweden beat Finland by 14-3.

== Women's Bandy World Championship ==
The team has participated in all Women's Bandy World Championships since the first tournament in 2004. The team has won every championship tournament except in 2014, when they lost the final to Russia.

For the 2016 Women's Bandy World Championship, the team got an official song, "Watch Out" by Furfobia.

== See also ==
- Bandy
- Rink bandy
- Women's Bandy World Championship
  - Great Britain women's national bandy team
  - United States women's national bandy team
  - Russia women's national bandy team
  - Finland women's national bandy team
  - Norway women's national bandy team
  - Switzerland women's national bandy team
  - China women's national bandy team
  - Canada women's national bandy team
  - Hungary women's national bandy team
  - Soviet Union women's national bandy team
