= Norway women's national bandy team =

National sports team

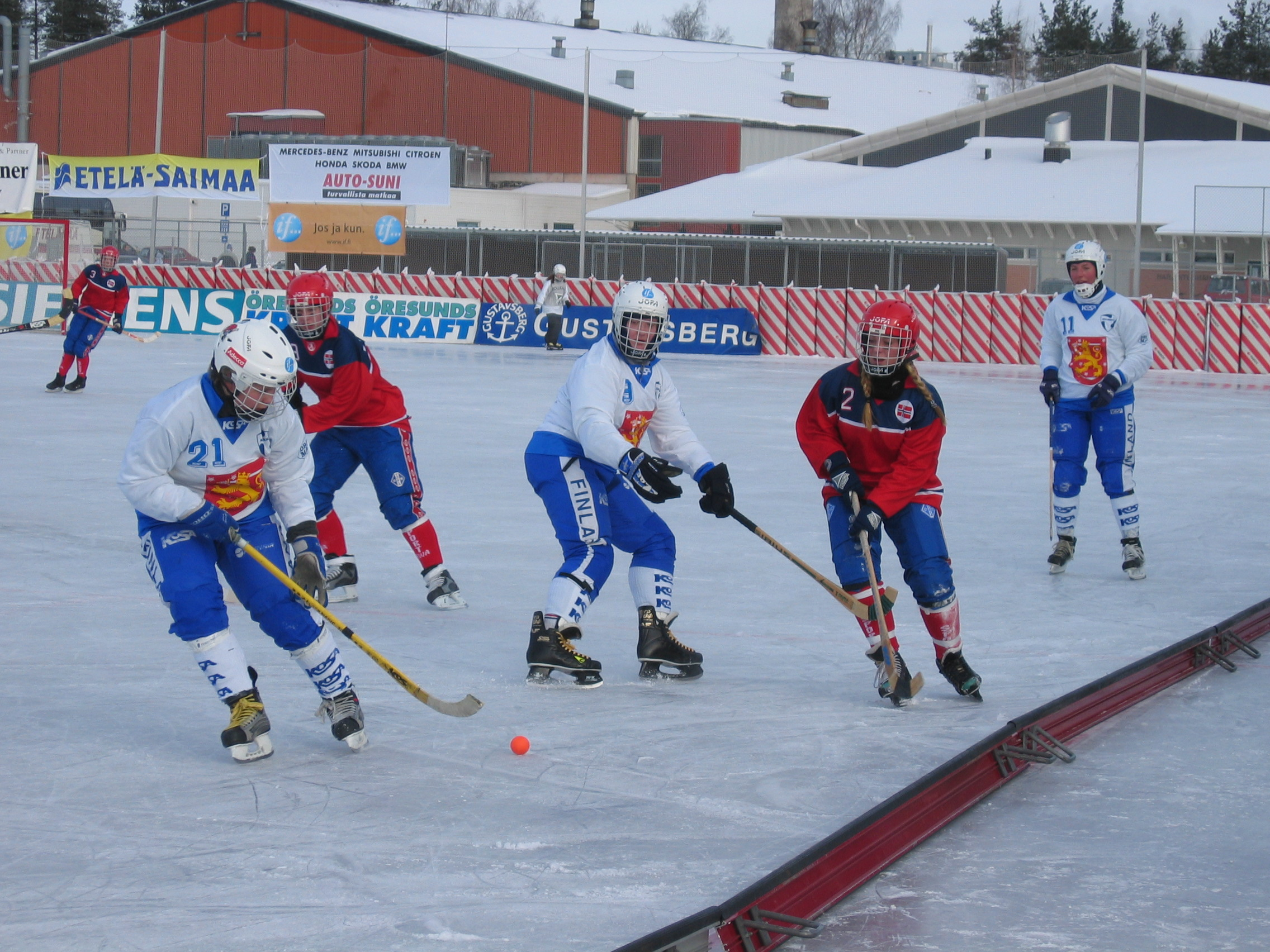
A bandy international competition between Finland and Norway in the 2004 Women's Bandy World Championship in Lappeenranta

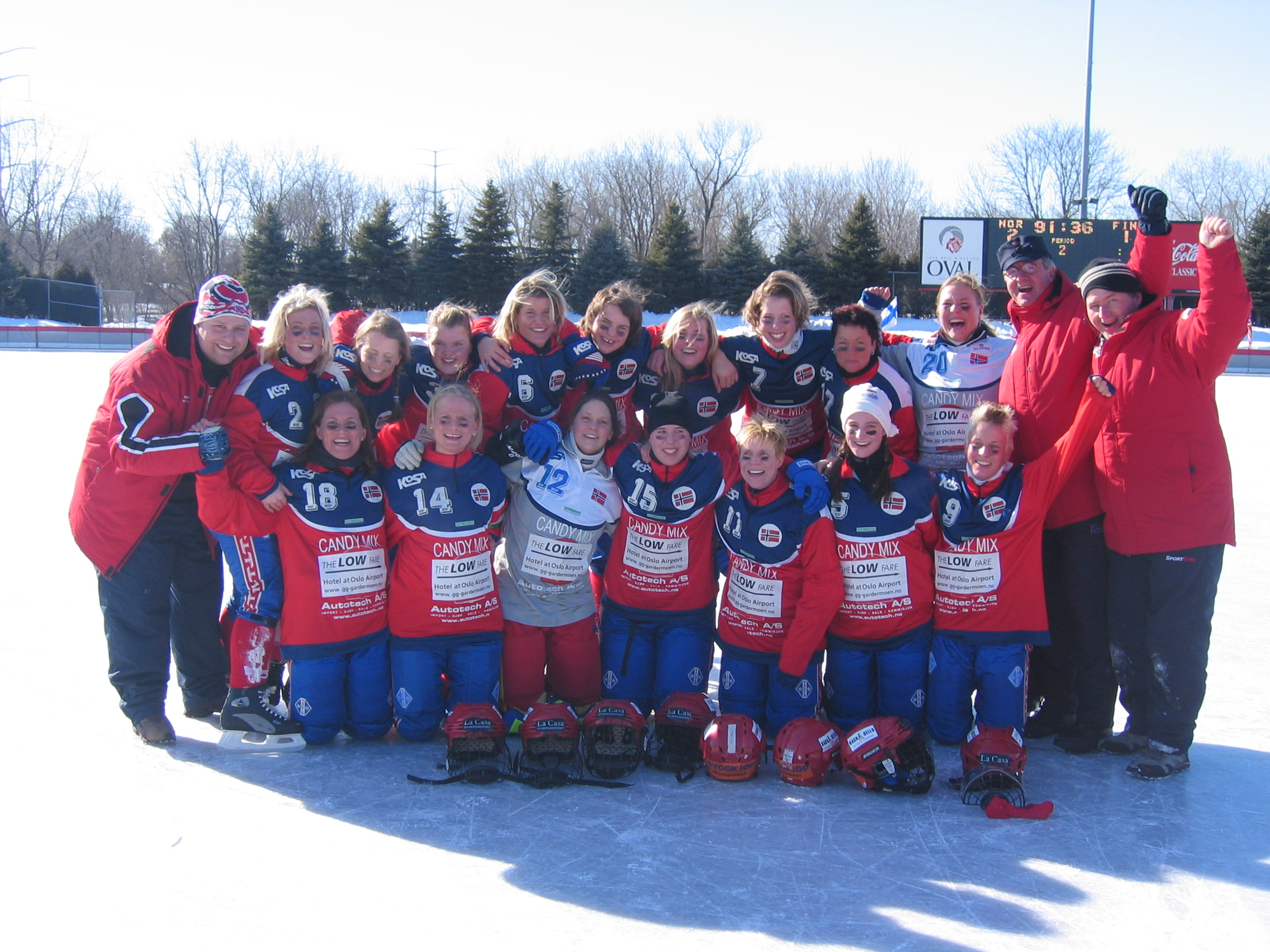
The Norway women's national bandy team in 2006

Norway Women's National Bandy Team represents Norway in international bandy competitions and friendly matches against other nations in the sport of bandy. The team has participated in all World Championships for women since the inaugural tournament in 2004. As of 2018, the team has won five bronze medals.

Norway was the host for the 2010 Women's Bandy World Championship, which was organized in Drammen.

== World Championship results ==
Norway reached the final of the Women's Bandy World Championship for the first time in 2022, held in Växjö, Sweden, finishing as runners-up after a 12–0 defeat to Sweden. At the 2025 Women's Bandy World Championship in Lidköping, Sweden, Norway again advanced to the final, where Sweden won 8–1, with Norway receiving the silver medal. At the 2026 Women's Bandy World Championship in Pori, Finland, Norway once more claimed silver, again finishing behind Sweden in the final. Norway's Isabel Robertson was named best defender of the 2026 tournament.

== See also ==
- Bandy
- Rink bandy
- Women's Bandy World Championship
  - Great Britain women's national bandy team
  - Sweden women's national bandy team
  - Russia women's national bandy team
  - Finland women's national bandy team
  - United States women's national bandy team
  - Switzerland women's national bandy team
  - China women's national bandy team
  - Canada women's national bandy team
  - Hungary women's national bandy team
  - Soviet Union women's national bandy team
