= United States women's national bandy team =

National sports team

United States women's national bandy team represents the United States in the Women's Bandy World Championship. The team has participated in all Bandy World Championships for women since the first tournament in 2004.

== Women's World Championship ==
=== 2004 ===
Team USA played their first Women's Bandy World Championship in 2004 along with Sweden, Finland, Norway, and Russia. In their first match, they would lose 9-1 to Finland. In the next two against Sweden and Russia, they would lose 9-1 and 8-0, respectively, losing by exactly eight goals in each their first three matches. Hoping to turn their luck around, they would play Norway to finish off the premier tour, but they would fall 5-1.

=== 2006 ===
Team USA would host the tournament in 2006, playing their matches in Roseville, Minnesota. This tournament would see the addition of a second North American team in team Canada. It would also see them become slightly more competitive, managing to only lose by two against Finland on the opening night. However, they would lose both matches that night, with the other one being against Sweden, falling 7-0 and 2-0. In their only match of the second day, they would lose 7-0 to Russia. On day three of the tournament, they would score their only goal of the 2006 World Championship in a 1-1 draw against the Norwegians. They would lose the final game of the premier tour against Canada 1-0 to come last in the preliminary stage, but in the 5th place playoff, they would win the Canadian rematch 2-0 to win their first Women's World Championship game.

=== 2007 ===
Once again another addition would be made in 2007, this time Hungary would join the lineup as the host country. USA would lose to Finland 5-0 in their opener, but they would blow out Hungary 10-0 in their second match. They wouldn't continue the streak, losing 10-0 to Russia the very next day, but they would keep the score 0-0 against Sweden all the way to a penalty shootout where they would ultimately lose. They would then fall once more to Norway, 3-0. Finally, against the Canadians on the final day of the premier tour, they would lose 6-1. For the first time, they would stay out of last place, but they would fail to make the knockouts, with only three points to their name. In the 5th place playoff, they would lose to Finland 2-1, meaning they would finish the 7 team tournament in 6th place.

=== 2008 ===
There were no changes to the nations lineup in 2008, but it was hosted in Sweden for the first time. In Team USA's first match, they would lose to Norway just 1-0. They would then lose 13-0 to the hosting Swedes the same night. They would get a score on the Fins the next day but could still only muster up a 1-5 loss, and against Russia later, they would fall 9-0. They would start the final day of the premier tour on a lighter note, beating Hungary 4-0. Against their rivals Canada, the girls would draw 0-0. They would come sixth, and in a rematch with team Canada in the fifth place match, they would lose two-nil.

=== 2009 ===
The United States Women's bandy team was on hiatus.

=== 2010 ===
The 2010 World Championship was held in Drammen, Norway, February 24-27th. There were six participating nations: the United States of America, Canada, Finland, Norway, Russia, and Sweden. They lost the fifth place match to Finland, 1-4.

=== 2011 ===
The World Championship moved to an every-other year schedule. The US Women's team hosted the Canadian team at the North American Challenge Cup at the Guidant John Rose Minnesota OVAL in February 2011.

=== 2012 ===
The World Championship returned in 2012, in Irkutsk, Russia, from February 23rd-26th. The United States beat Norway in the 5th round match, beating Norway for the first time in the team's history.

=== 2013 ===
2013 was another off year for the World Championship. The United States women's team instead hosted the North American Challenge Cup at the Guidant John Rose Minnesota OVAL. The cup took place December 28th to the 30th.

=== 2014 ===
2014 saw the return of the World Championship, which took place in Lappeenranta, Finland, on the ten year anniversary of the inaugural Women's World Championship.

=== 2015 ===
This was another off year for the World Championship, and the final year of the North American Challenge Cup series. The cup was played January 24th and January 25th. In February of that year, the Guidant John Rose Minnesota OVAL hosted the F17 Bandy World Championship, which hosted teams of female players 17 and younger. Finland, Russia, Sweden and the United States fielded teams. Team USA fell to Finland in the Bronze Medal match.

=== 2016 ===
The 2016 World Championship was hosted for the first time in America, at the Guidant John Rose Minnesota OVAL. The tournament was held between February 18th to the 21st. This was the first year that China fielded a women's bandy team. US goalie, Sarah Ahlquist Schneider was named Best Goalkeeper of the World Championship. In October the team took a group trip to Norway and Sweden to train with Norwegian bandy players. After this trip, the Minneapolis Bandoliers made their international debut in the Women's World Cup of Bandy.

=== 2018 ===
In 2018. the World Championship took place in China, at the Chengde Mountain Resort from January 9th to the 13th. This was the first time the women's World Championship was split into an "A" and "B" pool. Norway, Russia, Sweden and the United States made up pool A, while China, Estonia, Finland and Switzerland made up pool B. The Americans beat China 5-0 in the 5th place match. In February, the United States Women's National Bandy Team became Champions of the American Bandy Association's First Division, which is a competitive men's bandy league, skating as the only all-female team. The lone goal in the Championship match was scored by Allie Thunstrom and Sarah Ahlquist Schneider was named tournament MVP.

=== 2019 ===
The United States Women's Bandy team participated in the Winder Universiade in Krasnoyarsk, Russia. This was the first time bandy was included as a sport in Universiade. It is the second largest multi-sport event in the world, behind the Olympics.

=== 2020 ===
The 2020 World Championship was held in Oslo, Norway, February 19-22. The team did not advance to the medal round by a single goal.

=== 2021 ===
2021 saw the advent of the Liberty League, which was designed to help the US women's team prepare for the upcoming World Championship. The Liberty League composed of scrimmages of the US Women's team against some of the best male bandy players in America. They practiced at the Eden Prairie Community Center.

=== 2022 ===
The 2022 World Championship took place March 23-27 at Eriksson Arena , Växjö/Åby in Sweden. The Russian and Ukrainian teams withdrew due to the outbreak of the Russo-Ukrainian War. Because of this, the United States had an automatic chance to play for a medal. They faced off against Finland for the bronze medal on March 27th, and lost 2-5.

=== 2023 ===
The United States won Bronze at the World Championship, the first Medal in USA Women's Bandy History. The World Championship was held at Eriksson Arena , Växjö/Åby in Sweden. 2023 was also the 40th year anniversary of women's bandy in America.

=== 2024 ===
The team participated at the 2024 Four Nations Cup, a tournament that took place March 21-24, 2024, in Gothenburg, Sweden. The teams represented in the Four Nations Cup were the United States, Finland, Sweden, and Norway.

=== 2025 ===
The team took home Bronze at the World Championship in Lidköping, Sweden. They wont their first-ever international medal against a fellow A-Pool opponent, received their highest seed ever in a World Championship at 2nd, and scored in every match they played in. This was the first time the US Women's team went an entire World Championship without being shut out at least once. Ten different Americans scored at least once goal in the tournament, and 12 finished with at least one point. These are the most US players to score since 2016.

=== 2026 ===
The 2026 World Championships will take place January 12-18, in Pori Finland.

== See also ==
- Bandy
- Rink bandy
- Women's Bandy World Championship
  - Great Britain women's national bandy team
  - Sweden women's national bandy team
  - Russia women's national bandy team
  - Finland women's national bandy team
  - Norway women's national bandy team
  - Switzerland women's national bandy team
  - China women's national bandy team
  - Canada women's national bandy team
  - Hungary women's national bandy team
  - Soviet Union women's national bandy team
