= Russia women's national bandy team =

National sports team

Russia women's national bandy team is the women's team representing Russia in the sport of bandy. The team competes in the Women's Bandy World Championship.

On the International Olympic Committee's recommendations following the 2022 Russian invasion of Ukraine, the Federation of International Bandy excluded Russia from participating in the 2022 Women's Bandy World Championship.

== See also ==
- Bandy
- Rink bandy
- Women's Bandy World Championship
  - Great Britain women's national bandy team
  - Sweden women's national bandy team
  - Finland women's national bandy team
  - Norway women's national bandy team
  - Switzerland women's national bandy team
  - China women's national bandy team
  - Canada women's national bandy team
  - United States women's national bandy team
  - Hungary women's national bandy team
  - Soviet Union women's national bandy team
