= Sports in Minnesota =

Sports in Minnesota include professional teams in all major sports, Olympic Games contenders and medalists, especially in the Winter Olympics, collegiate teams in major and small-school conferences and associations and active amateur teams and individual sports. The state of Minnesota has a team in all five major professional sports leagues in the United States and Canada (Major League Baseball, National Basketball Association, National Football League, National Hockey League and Major League Soccer). Along with professional sports, there are numerous collegiate teams including the University of Minnesota Golden Gophers and St. Thomas Tommies in NCAA Division I, as well as many others across the Minnesota public and private colleges and universities.

== Major professional sports ==
=== Baseball ===
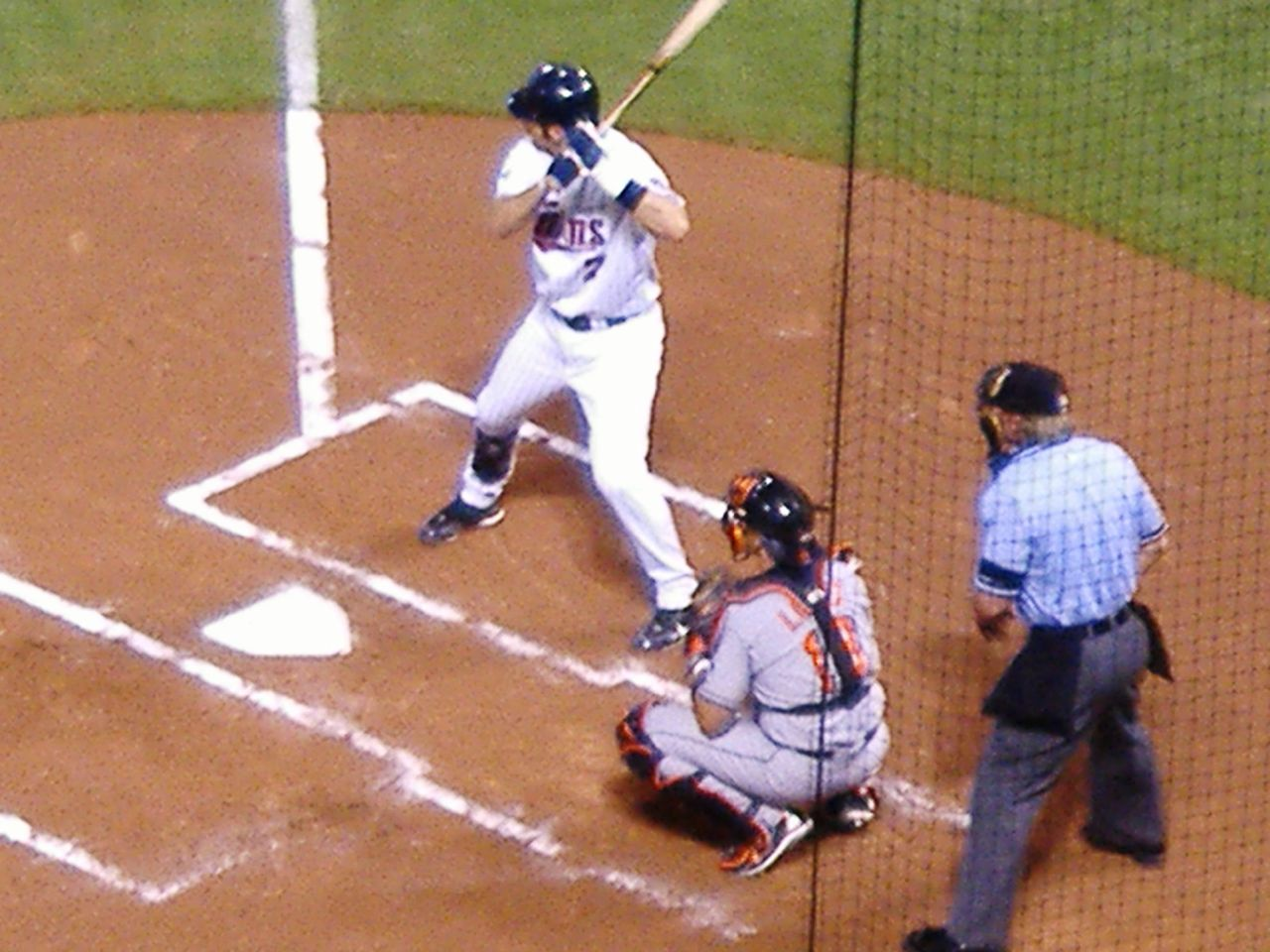
Twins catcher Joe Mauer at bat, Metrodome.

The Minnesota Twins are an MLB team that moved to Minnesota in 1961 from Washington D.C., where they were known as the Washington Senators. The Twins played their home games at Metropolitan Stadium in Bloomington from 1961 to 1981 and the Metrodome in Minneapolis from 1982 to 2009, moving to their current stadium, Target Field, in 2010. They have been to the World Series in 1965, 1987 and 1991, winning in 1987 and 1991. In 2001, the Twins and the Montreal Expos were threatened with closure in a contraction scheme of the Commissioner of Baseball. That effort was unsuccessful, and the next year the team made it to the American League Championship Series (ALCS). Notable current and former Twins include Kirby Puckett, Bert Blyleven, Rod Carew, Tony Oliva, Harmon Killebrew, Paul Molitor, Johan Santana, Joe Mauer, Justin Morneau, Torii Hunter, Joe Nathan, David Ortiz and Kent Hrbek. There is a Minor League Baseball team based in St Paul called the St Paul Saints.

The current St. Paul Saints are the Minnesota Twins AAA affiliate team. The team used to be part of the Northern League. The team was founded in 1993 as an inaugural team in the league. They won the Northern League Championship in 1993, 1995, 1996, and 2004. Notable current and former players include Kevin Millar, Darryl Strawberry, Jason Varitek, Jack Morris, and Ila Borders. The Saints play their home games at CHS Field in St. Paul and are the current Triple-A affiliate of Major League Baseball's Minnesota Twins. They moved to downtown St Paul in time for the 2015 season, to start play at the new CHS Field.

=== Basketball ===
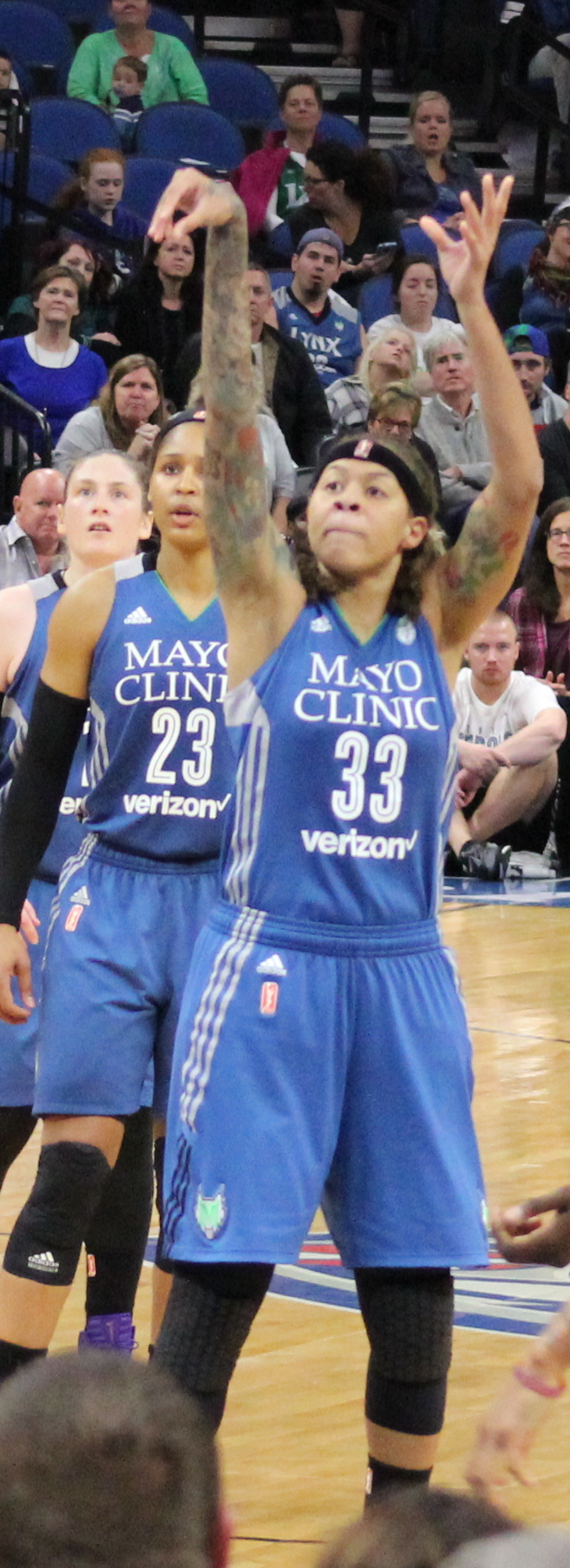
Seimone Augustus of the Minnesota Lynx shoots a goal in the 2016 WNBA Finals at Target Center. At left are Lindsay Whalen and Maya Moore.

The Minnesota Lynx are a Women's National Basketball Association (WNBA) team founded in 1999 and play their home games at Target Center in Minneapolis. The Lynx have won four WNBA Championships, doing so during the 2011, 2013, 2015 and 2017 season. In 2005, the Lynx drafted Seimone Augustus from Louisiana State University. She quickly became the foundation of the franchise and has been the focus of many WNBA advertisements. Maya Moore, drafted first overall in 2011, has contributed in great part to the Lynx's success, winning an MVP award in 2014.

The Minnesota Timberwolves are an NBA team founded in 1989 and play their home games at Target Center in Minneapolis. The "Wolves", as they are called by fans, have yet to appear in an NBA Finals series, but made it to the Western Conference Finals in 2004. In 2000, NBA officials ruled that the Wolves violated league rules when signing then-free agent Joe Smith. They then declared the contract was henceforth invalid, fined the organization $3.5 million and took the team's next three first-round draft picks. Notable current and former players include Kevin Garnett, Kevin Love, Sam Cassell, Karl-Anthony Towns, Ricky Rubio, Stephon Marbury, Latrell Sprewell, Terry Porter, Sam Mitchell, Wally Szczerbiak, Malik Sealy, Anthony Edwards and Andrew Wiggins.

The Minneapolis Lakers were an NBA team that was moved from Detroit to Minneapolis in 1947. Eventually in 1960, the Lakers moved to Los Angeles, where they became the Los Angeles Lakers. During their stay, the Minneapolis Lakers won the 1947–48 National Basketball League (NBL) championship, then joined four other NBL teams in joining the Basketball Association of America (BAA), where they won the 1948–49 BAA championship. After the 1948–49 season, the NBL and the BAA merged to become the NBA. The Lakers then won five championships in six years, in 1949, 1950, 1952, 1953 and 1954. They are considered to be the NBA's first "dynasty". Notable players include George Mikan, Jim Pollard, Vern Mikkelsen, Slater Martin, Clyde Lovellette and Elgin Baylor.

=== Football ===
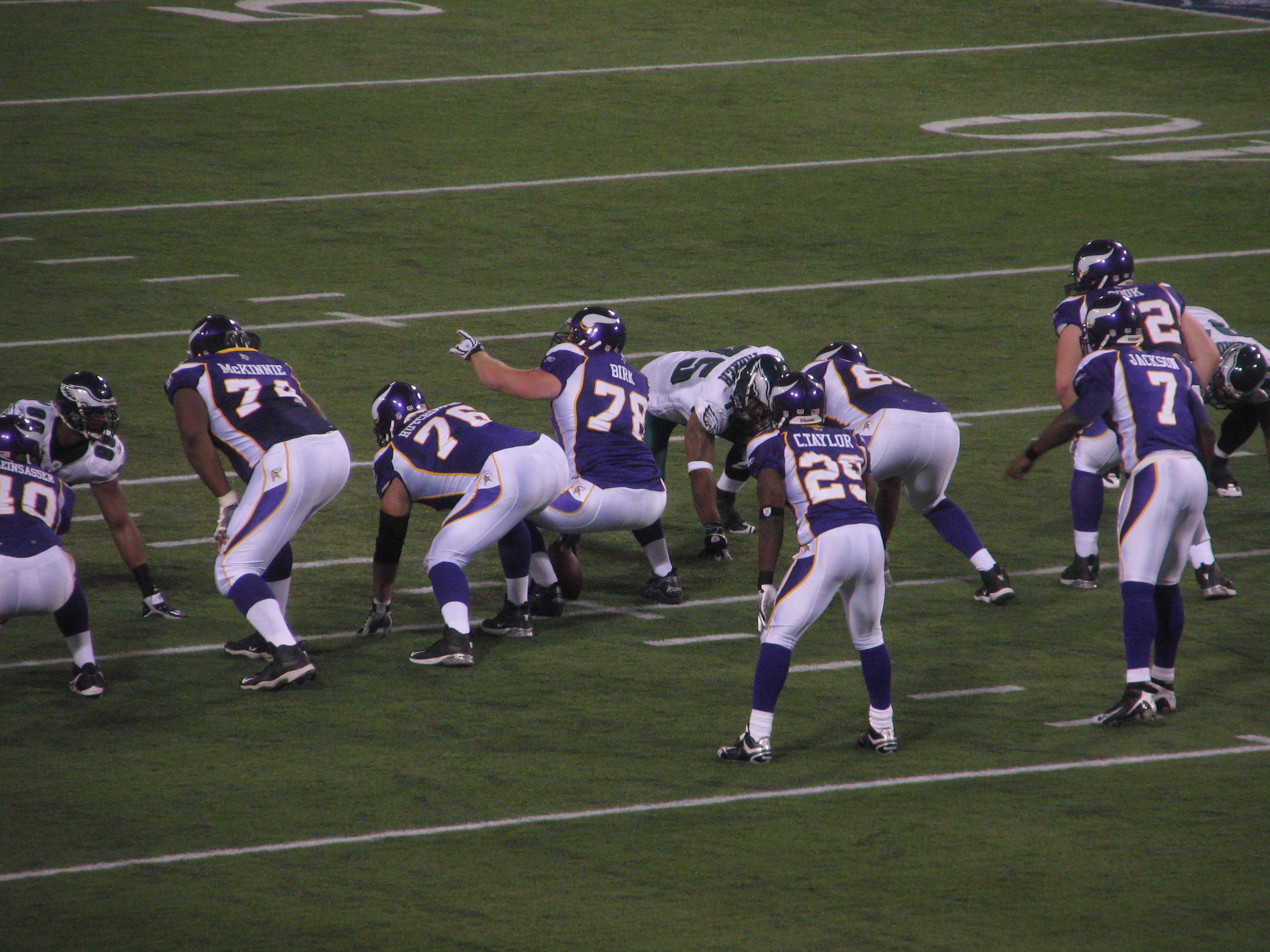
Vikings in action January 2009

The Minnesota Vikings are an NFL team founded as an expansion team in 1961. They play their home games at U.S. Bank Stadium. The Vikings have won one NFL Championship in 1969, one year before the AFL–NFL Merger. The Vikings were the first team to appear in four Super Bowls, but also lost all of them. Their last appearance in the Super Bowl was Super Bowl XI against the Oakland Raiders in 1977. Notable current and former players include Warren Moon, Randall Cunningham, Jim Marshall, Ron Yary, Mick Tingelhoff, Paul Krause, Cris Carter, Carl Eller, Fran Tarkenton, Chuck Foreman, Randy Moss, Daunte Culpepper, Darren Sharper, Jim Kleinsasser, Brad Johnson, Alan Page, the "Purple People Eaters", Adrian Peterson, Randall McDaniel, John Randle, Justin Jefferson, Fran Tarkenton among others.

Before the Vikings, Minnesota also hosted the Minneapolis Marines/Red Jackets and the Duluth Kelleys/Eskimos. Three players who played for Duluth are in the Pro Football Hall of Fame. The Duluth teams played at Athletic Park, while the Minneapolis teams played at Nicollet Park. In 2014, the Bemidji Axemen of Bemidji played two seasons as a team in the Indoor Football League.

The Minnesota Vixen are a Women's American Football team (WFA) founded in 1998. They are also the oldest professional women's football team in the U.S. The Minnesota Machine was a Women's American Football team (WFA) founded in 2008.

=== Ice Hockey ===
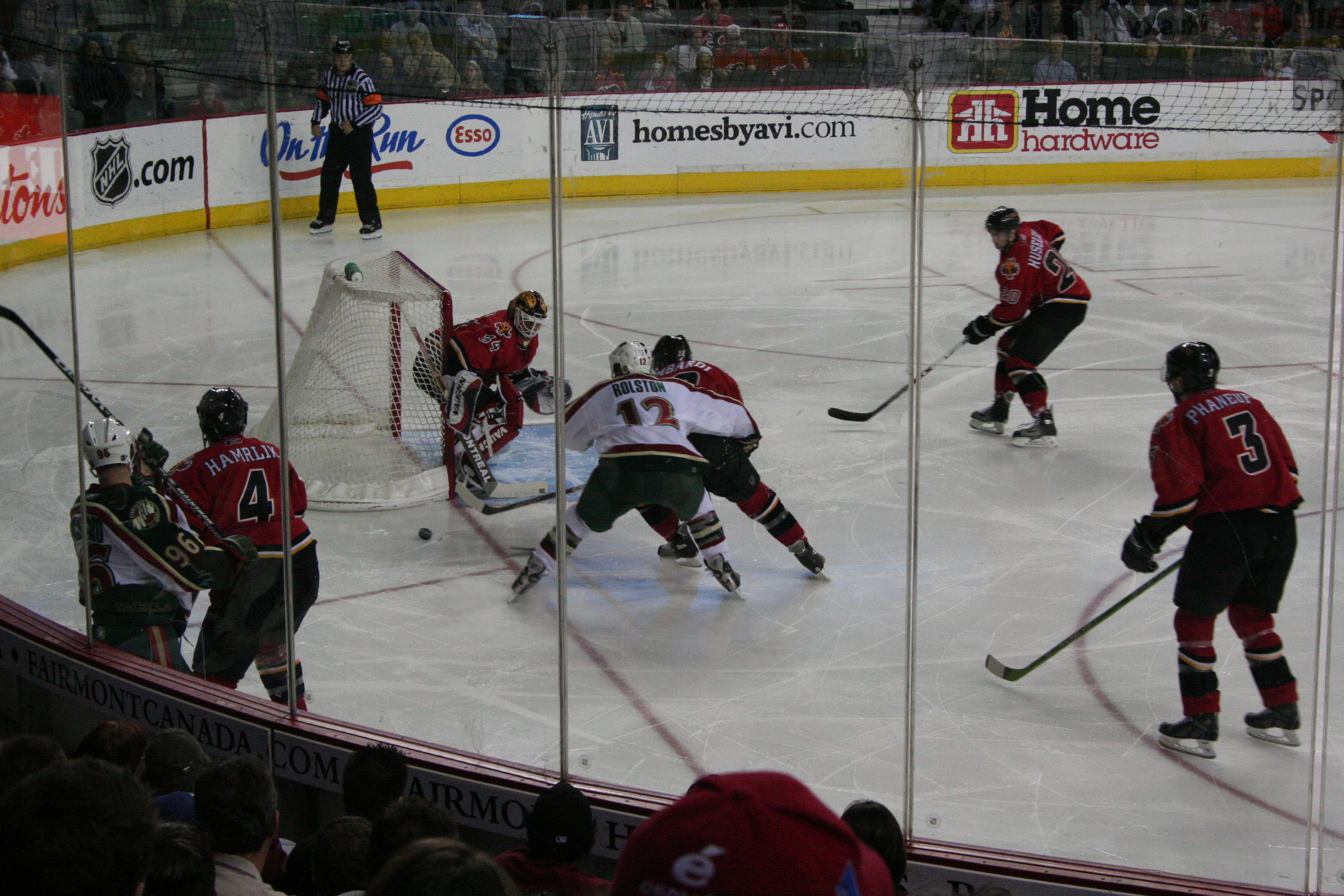
Minnesota Wild at Calgary Flames

The Minnesota Wild are an NHL team founded in 2000 based at the Grand Casino Arena in Saint Paul. The Wild have not appeared in the Stanley Cup Final. The Wild made it to the Western Conference Finals in 2003, by beating the Colorado Avalanche and Vancouver Canucks both in seven games after being down three games to one in the series, before being swept by the Mighty Ducks of Anaheim. With their second draft pick in franchise history, the Wild drafted Mikko Koivu, who now holds the team's record total franchise points. Notable Wild players include Marián Gáborík, Wes Walz, Darby Hendrickson, Mikko Koivu, Zach Parise, Ryan Suter, Thomas Vanek, Eric Staal, Jordan Leopold, and Kirill Kaprizov.

The Minnesota North Stars were an NHL team that was part of the 1967 NHL expansion. The North Stars played their home games at the Met Center in Bloomington. They appeared in the 1981 and 1991 Stanley Cup Finals, but did not win either one of them. In 1993, the North Stars moved to Dallas, where they became the Dallas Stars. Notable players include Harry Howell, John Mariucci, Gump Worsley, Neal Broten and Mike Modano.

The Minnesota Whitecaps were a professional women's team that played in the amateur Western Women's Hockey League (WWHL) from 2004 to 2011 and eventually joined the professional Premier Hockey Federation (PHF, formerly the National Women's Hockey League, or NWHL) for the 2018–19 season as an expansion team. The team has one Clarkson Cup title from 2010, and won the Isobel Cup in their first PHF season. They played at Richfield Ice Arena in Richfield.

In the summer of 2023, the PHF was shut down as part of the launch of a new, unified professional women's league, the Professional Women's Hockey League (PWHL). The Minnesota Frost became one of the inaugural six franchises in the new league, and announced that they would play their home games at the Grand Casino Arena. The team held the first ever PWHL draft pick and used it to select Minnesota Golden Gophers forward Taylor Heise. On May 30, 2024, they became the league's first champions as they won the inaugural Walter Cup. On May 26, 2025, the Frost defended their title and repeated as Walter Cup champions.

The U.S. Hockey Hall of Fame is located in Eveleth, on the Iron Range.

=== Soccer ===
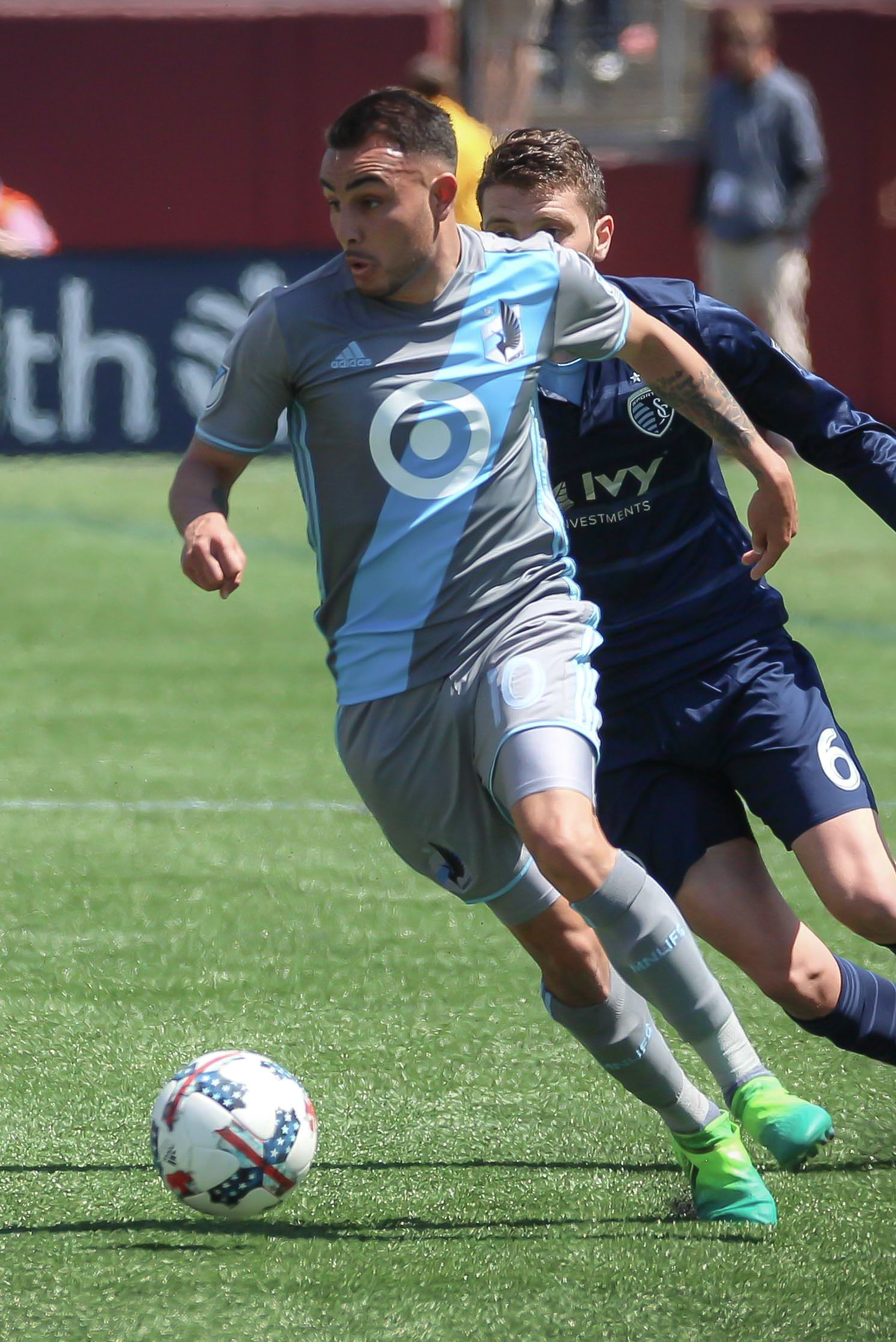
Miguel Ibarra playing for Minnesota United FC in 2017

Minnesota United FC is a Major League Soccer team that was founded in 2010 as the NSC Minnesota Stars. In 2013, the club rebranded with a new crest and a new name, Minnesota United FC. In 2010 when the club was founded, it began to play in North American Soccer League in the second tier of US Soccer. In March 2015, MLS announced that Minnesota United had been awarded an expansion spot in MLS. The team continued to compete in the NASL until the 2017 season when Minnesota United began to compete in MLS. This marked the introduction of top division soccer to Minnesota since the Minnesota Kicks dissolved in 1981. Minnesota United currently plays its home games at Allianz Field in Saint Paul. Minnesota United is nicknamed "the Loons" after Minnesota's state bird, the common loon. The Wonderwall is Minnesota United’s supporters’ section, a standing room only area behind one of the goals. It is named after the Oasis song of the same name, which is sung after every home game win. Notable players for Minnesota United include Kevin Molino, Darwin Quintero, Osvaldo Alonso, Miguel Ibarra, Ethan Finlay, Emanuel Reynoso, Teemu Pukki, Robin Lod, Michael Boxall, Wil Trapp, Dayne St. Clair, Bongokuhle Hlongwane, Tani Oluwaseyi, Joesph Rosales, Kelvin Yeboah, and Joaquin Pereyra. Minnesota United has had three managers in its MLS run, them being Adrian Heath, Eric Ramsay, and Cameron Knowles.

The Thunder were a USL First Division team founded in 1992 as an amateur men's team, then joined the USL in 1994, and won the championship of what was then the A-League in 1999. Notable former players include Tony Sanneh and Manuel Lagos.

The Minnesota Lightning were a W-League team founded in 2006. They also played at the National Sports Center. The team folded after the 2009 season.

The newest addition to Minnesota sports, the Minnesota Aurora FC are a USL W League team founded in 2021 and began play in May 2022.

== Table of professional teams ==
=== Current teams ===
Club	Sport	League	Home Venue	City	Year Established	Championships
Minnesota Frost	Ice hockey	Professional Women's Hockey League	Grand Casino Arena	St. Paul	2023	2024, 2025
Minnesota Wind Chill	Ultimate	Ultimate Frisbee Association	Sea Foam Stadium	St. Paul	2013	2024
Minnesota Lynx	Basketball	Women's National Basketball Association	Target Center	Minneapolis	1999	2011, 2013, 2015, 2017
Minnesota United FC	Soccer	Major League Soccer	Allianz Field	St. Paul	2010	NASL: 2011, 2014
Minnesota Twins	Baseball	Major League Baseball	Target Field	Minneapolis	1961	1987, 1991
Minnesota Vikings	American football	National Football League	U.S. Bank Stadium	Minneapolis	1961	1969
St. Paul Saints	Baseball	International League	CHS Field	St. Paul	1993	Northern League: 1993, 1995, 1996, 2004; American Association: 2019
Fargo-Moorhead RedHawks	Baseball	American Association	Newman Outdoor Field	Fargo	1996	Northern League: 1998, 2003, 2006, 2009
Minnesota Timberwolves	Basketball	National Basketball Association	Target Center	Minneapolis	1989	
Minnesota Wild	Ice hockey	National Hockey League	Grand Casino Arena	St. Paul	2000	
Minnesota RØKKR	Esports	Call of Duty League	Minneapolis Armory	Minneapolis	2019	
Minnesota Aurora FC	Soccer	USL W League	TCO Stadium	Eagan	2021	
Duluth Harbor Monsters	Indoor football	The Arena League	DECC Arena	Duluth	2023	
TC Gemini	Rugby	Women's Elite Rugby	TCO Stadium	Eagan	2025	
Minnesota Northern Lights	Ice Hockey	Federal Prospects Hockey League	Ralph Engelstad Arena	Thief River Falls	2026	

=== Former Minnesota teams ===
Club	Sport	League	Home Venue	City	Year Established	Year Disbanded or Moved	Number of seasons	Championships
Bemidji Axemen (defunct)	Indoor football	Indoor Football League	Sanford Center	Bemidji	2014	2015	2	
Duluth Kelleys/Eskimos (defunct)	Football	National Football League	Athletic Park	Duluth	1923	1927	4	
Duluth-Superior Lumberjacks (defunct)	Indoor football	Indoor Football League		Duluth	1999	2000	2	
Minnesota Machine (defunct)	Women's American Football	Women's Football Alliance	Minnetonka High School	Minnetonka	2009	2017	9	
Minneapolis Millers (defunct)	Baseball	American Association	Nicollet Park (defunct); Metropolitan Stadium (defunct)	Minneapolis; Bloomington	1884	1960	74	1896, 1910, 1911, 1912, 1915, 1932, 1935, 1955, 1958, 1959
Minnesota Muskies (relocated to Miami Floridians) (defunct)	Basketball	ABA	Met Center (defunct)	Bloomington	1967	1968	1	
Minnesota Pipers (returned to Pittsburgh Pipers) (defunct)	Basketball	ABA	Met Center (defunct)	Bloomington	1968	1969	1	
Minnesota Goofy's/Norsemen (defunct)	Softball	APSPL	Midway Stadium	Minneapolis	1977	1979	3	
Minnesota Purple Rage (defunct)	Indoor football	Indoor Football League	Verizon Center	Mankato	1999	2000	1	
Minnesota Ripknees (defunct)	Basketball	ABA	Gangelhoff Center	St. Paul	2006	2008	2	
Minneapolis Marines/Red Jackets (defunct)	Football	National Football League	Nicollet Park (defunct)	Minneapolis	1905	1930	20	
Minnesota Kicks (defunct)	Soccer	NASL (defunct)	Metropolitan Stadium (defunct)	Bloomington	1976	1981	6	
Minnesota Strikers (defunct)	Soccer	NASL (defunct)	Hubert H. Humphrey Metrodome (defunct)	Minneapolis	1984	1988	5	
Minnesota Thunder (defunct)	Soccer	USL First Division, USL A-League (defunct)	National Sports Center; James Griffin Stadium	Blaine; St. Paul	1990	2009	16	1999
Minnesota Lightning (defunct)	Soccer	USL W-League	National Sports Center	Blaine	2006	2009	4	
Minnesota Monarchs (defunct)	Volleyball	Major League Volleyball	Si Melby Hall	Minneapolis	1987	1989	2	
Minnesota Fighting Pike (defunct)	Arena football	Arena Football League	Target Center	Minneapolis	1995	1996	1	
Minneapolis Lakers (now the Los Angeles Lakers)	Basketball	NBA / Basketball Association of America	Minneapolis Auditorium (defunct); Minneapolis Armory	Minneapolis	1947	1960	14	1949, 1950, 1952, 1953, 1954
Minnesota North Stars (now the Dallas Stars)	Ice hockey	National Hockey League	Met Center (defunct)	Bloomington	1967	1993	26	
Minnesota Fighting Saints (defunct)	Ice hockey	World Hockey Association	St. Paul Civic Center (defunct)	St. Paul	1972	1977	5	
Minnesota Moose (now the Manitoba Moose)	Ice hockey	International Hockey League	St. Paul Civic Center (defunct)	St. Paul	1994	1996	2	
Minnesota Whitecaps (defunct)	Ice hockey	Premier Hockey Federation	TRIA Rink; Richfield Ice Arena	Richfield	2004	2023	12	2010, 2019
Minnesota Swarm (now the Georgia Swarm)	Indoor lacrosse	National Lacrosse League	Xcel Energy Center	St. Paul	2004	2015	11	
Minnesota Valkyrie (defunct)	Arena football	Lingerie Football League	Target Center	Minneapolis	2011	2013	2	
St. Paul Saints (defunct)	Baseball	Union Association	None	St. Paul	1884	1884	1	
Minnesota Myth (defunct)	Indoor football	Arena Football League	Target Center	Minneapolis	2023	2024	1	

== Other professional and semi-pro sports ==
=== Bandy ===
Bandy has been played on a regular basis in the United States since the early 1980s and the game is most popular in Minnesota, where the winter climate makes it possible to play outdoors for many months a year.

Most games in the American Bandy League are played at the Guidant John Rose Minnesota Oval and most of the national champions are teams from the state, like Minneapolis Bandolier, Dynamo Duluth, Minnesota Blades, and Sirius Minnesota. The Bandolier are the most successful team in the United States, having been crowned United States champions ten times as of 2014.

Guidant John Rose Minnesota Oval was also the main venue of the 1995 Bandy World Championship and the 2006 Women's Bandy World Championship. It will also host the 2016 Women's Bandy World Championship.

=== Lacrosse ===
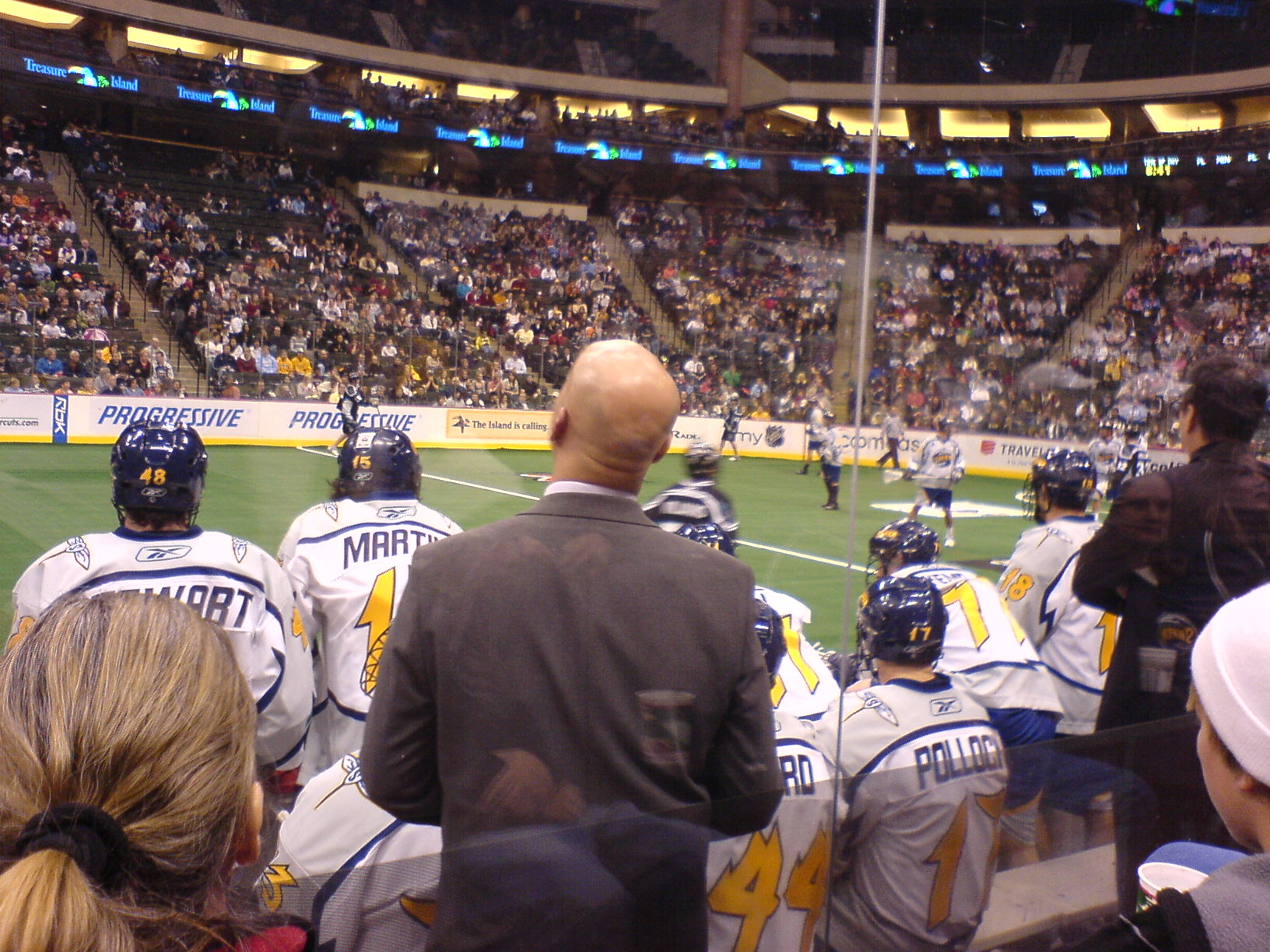
Minnesota Swarm

The Minnesota Swarm were the state's professional lacrosse team from 2005 to 2015. All home games for the Minnesota Swarm were played at the Xcel Energy Center. The National Lacrosse League (NLL) awarded St. Paul the inactive Montreal Express franchise on August 10, 2004. After eleven seasons of mixed success playing in Minnesota, the Swarm left Minnesota for Georgia as they became the Georgia Swarm. Swarm owner John Arlotta cited difficulty negotiating a lease with the Xcel Energy Center, competition from other local sports teams, and decreasing ticket sales as reasons for the franchise's relocation.

=== Gaelic games ===
In the Twin Cities, which has a large Irish-American community, the Gaelic Athletic Association has a club named after Irish republican icon Robert Emmett. The club fields hurling, camogie, and Gaelic football teams. On August 2, 2019, the women of the Robert Emmets Hurling Club's Camogie team won the Silver Cup at the 2019 Gaelic Athletic Association World Games at Croke Park in Dublin.

=== Golf ===
Minnesota plays host to several professional golf events. In 2019, the state became host to the 3M Open, a PGA Tour event in Blaine, which replaced the PGA Tour Champions event that was hosted in Blaine annually since 1993. What used to be the Burnett Senior Classic played at Bunker Hills is now the 3M Championship played at TPC Twin Cities in Blaine. Minnesota was the host of the LPGA Classic from 1990 to 1998 at Edinburgh USA in Brooklyn Park. The Nationwide Tour stops annually at Tom Lehman's Somerby Golf Club and Community in Byron.

The state has hosted several major events. The U.S. Open has been played in the state four times, twice at Hazeltine National Golf Club in Chaska in 1970 and 1991, once at Interlachen Country Club in Edina (1930) in Bobby Jones' historic win, and once at The Minikahda Club in Minneapolis (1916). Hazeltine played host to the PGA Championship in 2002 and 2009, and the Ryder Cup in 2016; it will host the Women's PGA Championship in 2019 and the Ryder Cup again in 2028. Keller Golf Course in Maplewood hosted the 1932 and 1954 PGA Championships, the 1949 Western Open, and the St. Paul Open from 1930 to 1968 (a regular PGA stop). Interlachen Country Club hosted the Solheim Cup in 2002 and the U.S. Women's Open in 2008.

=== Disc Golf ===
Disc golf courses in the Twin Cities play host to the Minnesota Majestic on the third weekend every June. It is part of the Professional Disc Golf Association's National Tour, the top level of pro/am disc golf events in America. The tournament has frequented Kaposia Park, Blue Ribbon Pines and Hyland Ski Area, among other courses. The 2010 Minnesota Majestic was the 23rd annual.

=== Ultimate Frisbee ===
The Minnesota Wind Chill were founded in 2013 as an expansion team for the American Ultimate Disc League (AUDL). The team plays in the Midwestern Division of the AUDL. Home games are played on the campus of Concordia University. The Minnesota Strike were founded in 2020 as an expansion team for the Premier Ultimate League (PUL). Home games are played on the campus of Benilde-St. Margaret's.

=== Softball ===
Minnesota had a professional slow-pitch softball team from 1977 to 1979 called the Minnesota Goofy's and then the Minnesota Norsemen. Former Viking Bob Lurtsema briefly played for the Norsemen. The Aussie Peppers was founded in 2018 and play in National Pro Fastpitch.

== Motorsports ==
=== NASCAR ===
There are two racetracks in Minnesota that hold NASCAR sanctioned events. Elko Speedway in Elko is a 3/8 mile paved oval, which has held NASCAR events for over twenty years. Raceway Park (Minnesota) in Shakopee is a 1/4 mile paved oval. NASCAR drivers from Minnesota include:

- Joe Frasson – Ran several races in the 1970s, best career finish is third (three times)
- Mike Garvey – NASCAR Camping World Truck Series driver
- Jerick Johnson – NASCAR Camping World Truck Series driver
- Brent Sherman – Ran six NASCAR Cup Series races in 2006
- Blackie Wangerin – Best career finish was 13th
- Nick Lewis - 2009 Raceway Park Bomber Track Champion
- William Sawalich – NASCAR Camping World Truck Series driver

=== NHRA ===
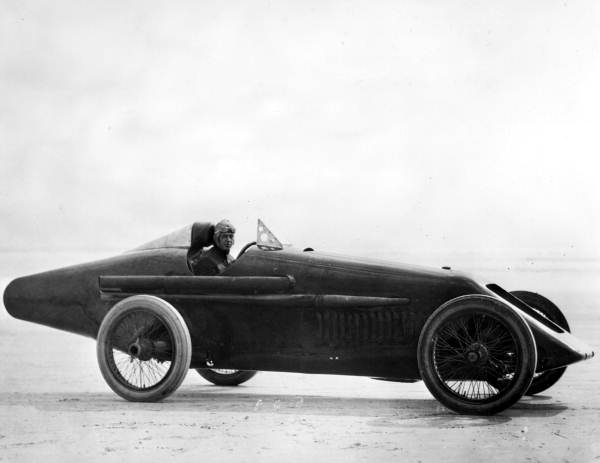
Milton in his car at Daytona Beach Road Course in 1920

Minnesota is known for being the home of the Brainerd International Raceway, which opened in 1963. It has hosted drag racing, road racing, and kart racing. NHRA drivers from Minnesota include:

- Greg Anderson
- Jason Line

=== Open Wheel ===
One of the most well-known drivers from Minnesota is Tommy Milton. Milton became the first driver to win two Indianapolis 500s with his wins in 1921 and 1923. Milton was completely blind in his right eye. In 2007 Rochester's Leilani Munter became the fourth woman in history to compete in the Indy Pro Series, the development league of IndyCar.

The aforementioned Brainerd International Raceway also hosts a 3-mile road course, which held a USAC race in 1969 among other events.

=== Rally ===
Rally America, based out of Golden Valley, holds an annual event in the woodlands near Bemidji. Known as the Ojibwe Forests Rally, the event is held near the end of August each year. Rally America also holds events in Michigan, Missouri, Oregon, Washington, Pennsylvania, Maine, and Colorado.

=== World of Outlaws ===
There is a yearly World of Outlaws (WoO) sprint car event held at Princeton Raceway. Known as the PolyDome Princeton Nationals, the event is held at the track due to WoO driver, Craig Dollansky, being from nearby Elk River.

== Athletics ==
Minnesota has a long history with athletics which dates back to the early years as a state, when arena track racing and college track teams drew large crowds. As the cities and towns in the state of Minnesota grew in the 1890s, track and field events became popular at schools and colleges. The early Olympic competitions (especially the 1908 Summer Olympics) boosted the profile of the "marathon," a 26.2 mile road running distance, and Minnesota had its own runnings of the race before 1920.

Minnesota has been touted as one of the healthiest states in the United States, which coincides with its strong base of road runners and high participation numbers in local road races. By the 1960s, future Olympian Ron Daws started the Land of Lakes Marathon in Minneapolis, which grew into the City of Lakes Marathon. The City of Lakes grew into the Twin Cities Marathon, which first ran in 1982.

The success of Olympian Garry Bjorklund and the speed of Minnesota's own Boston Marathon-legend Dick Beardsley prompted more growth in the sport in the North country near Duluth where the Grandma's Marathon first ran in 1977. It was named after a restaurant located on Canal Park, Duluth.

The state is also host to a team of distance running professionals training for national road races: the MN Distance Elite team (formerly known as Team USA Minnesota).

There are dozens of running clubs in the state, and they compete in a circuit of races known as the USATF Team Race Circuit.

=== Marathons ===
Today, there are eight Minnesota road marathons certified by United States Track and Field:

- Grandma's Marathon (from Two Harbors to Duluth, founded 1977)
- Twin Cities Marathon (from Minneapolis to St. Paul, founded 1982, but preceded by the Land of Lakes Marathon [1963–1975], the City of Lakes Marathon [1976–1981] and the St. Paul Marathon [1981]).
- Med City Marathon (in Rochester, founded 1996)
- Mankato Marathon (in Mankato, founded 2010)
- Lake Wobegon Trail Marathon (on paved trail from Holdingford to St. Joseph, founded 2008)
- Run for the Lakes Marathon (in Nisswa, founded 2008)
- Bemidji Blue Ox Marathon (in Bemidji, founded 2013)
- Ely Marathon (in Ely, Minnesota, founded 2015)

== College ==
The state of Minnesota has 27 schools competing in the National Collegiate Athletic Association (NCAA). Minnesota is one of eleven US states that do not have a school listed as a National Association of Intercollegiate Athletics (NAIA) member.

=== Division I ===
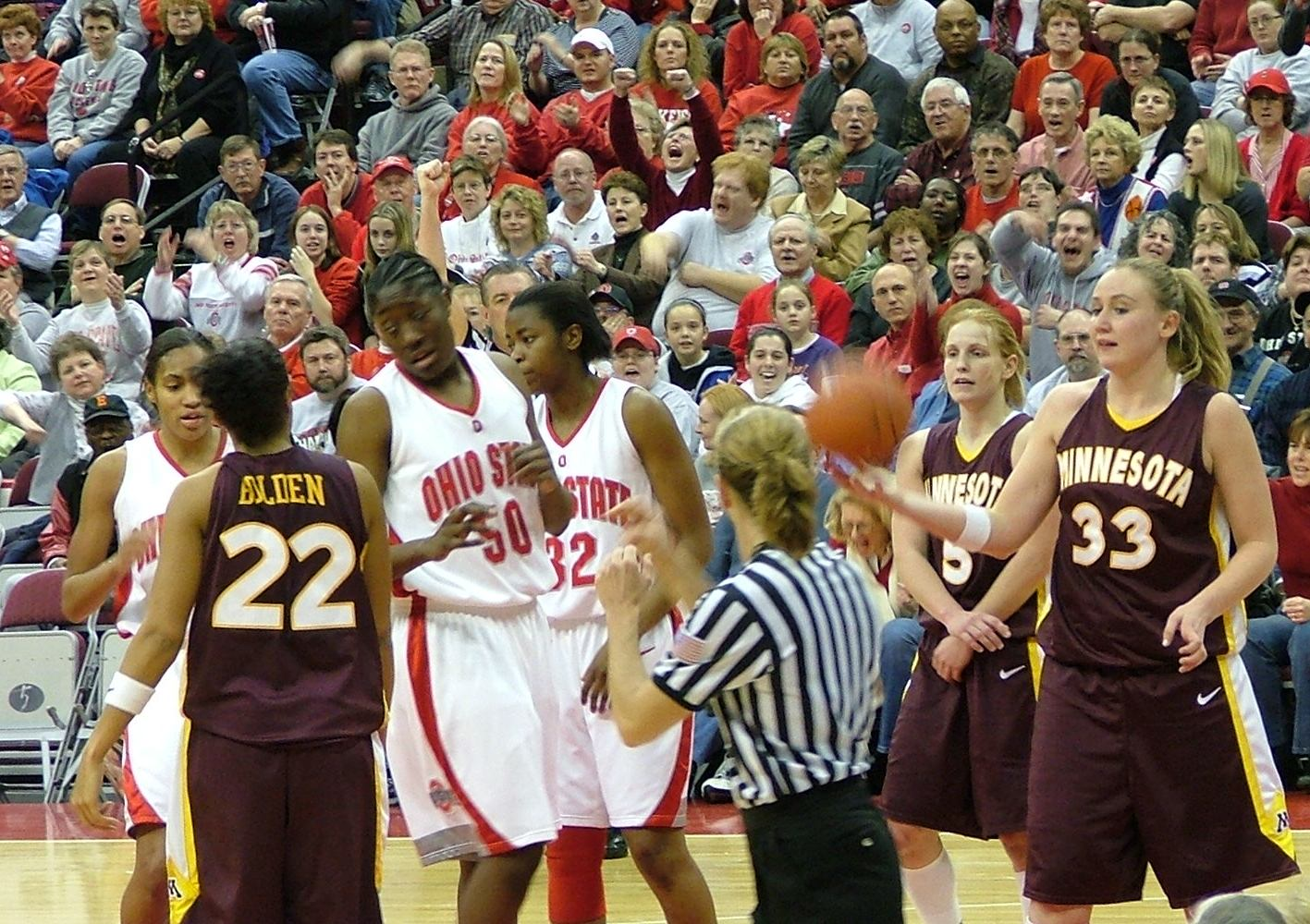
Minnesota Golden Gophers at Ohio State Buckeyes

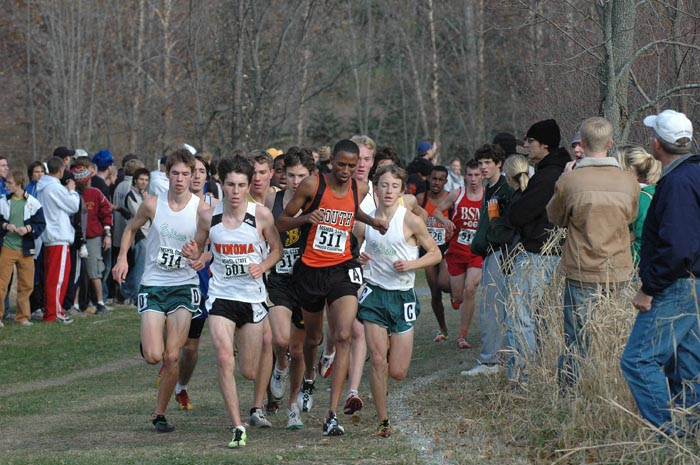
Minnesota state Cross-country meet

The Minnesota Golden Gophers compete in NCAA Division I as members of the Big Ten Conference for all sports except women's hockey, which the Big Ten sponsors only for men. In women's hockey, the school is a member of the NCAA Division I Western Collegiate Hockey Association (WCHA). The Golden Gophers have won 28 total national collegiate championships, including 7 in football, 5 in men's hockey, 3 in baseball, 7 in women's hockey, 2 in men's basketball, 1 in men's golf, 1 in men's track and field, and 3 in men's wrestling. The entire list of collegiate national championships can be found here. The Golden Gophers have also won 178 conference titles. A list of notable former Golden Gophers can be found at Minnesota Golden Gophers#Notable Gopher athletes and coaches.

Four other universities in Minnesota also compete in NCAA Division I with teams competing nationally in ice hockey. The other Division I schools are Bemidji State University, Minnesota State University, Mankato (branded for sports purposes as Minnesota State), and St. Cloud State University and the University of Minnesota Duluth. All of these universities field both men's and women's teams. All four currently compete on the women's side of the WCHA, but have differing homes for their men's teams. Bemidji State and Minnesota State also compete on the men's side of the WCHA, while Minnesota–Duluth and St. Cloud State compete in the National Collegiate Hockey Conference (NCHC), which only operates a men's league. Duluth Bulldogs have won five Division I championships in women's ice hockey and three Division I championships in men's ice hockey. After the 2020–21 season, Bemidji State and Minnesota State have left the men's WCHA to become inaugural members of the second Central Collegiate Hockey Association (CCHA). This league is the revival of a former Division I men's conference that had operated from 1971 to 2013.

In July 2021, the University of St. Thomas became the state's newest Division I school. The Tommies were expelled from their longtime Division III home of the Minnesota Intercollegiate Athletic Conference (MIAC), effective with the end of the 2020–21 school year, due to perceptions by most of the other MIAC members that they had grown too strong for the conference. St. Thomas soon received an invitation from the Summit League, a non-football Division I conference, to become a member effective upon its MIAC departure. St. Thomas eventually received a waiver of an NCAA rule mandating that Division III schools can only transition to Division II, allowing the school to move directly to D-I on the originally announced schedule. Of the school's 21 varsity sports, 18 participate in the Summit League. The football team plays in the Pioneer Football League, a football-only conference that competes in the second level of D-I football, the Football Championship Subdivision (FCS), thereby becoming the state's first FCS member. Men's hockey joined the revived CCHA, and women's hockey is in the WCHA.

=== Division II ===
The NCAA Division II teams in Minnesota primarily compete in the Northern Sun Intercollegiate Conference (NSIC). There are 9 Division II classified schools for the 2017–2018 year. The NSIC was founded in 1932 and joined the NCAA in 1992. Teams competing in the NSIC are:

- Bemidji State University – Beavers
- Concordia University, St. Paul – Golden Bears
- Minnesota State University, Mankato – Mavericks
- Minnesota State University Moorhead – Dragons
- Southwest Minnesota State University – Mustangs
- St. Cloud State University – Huskies
- University of Minnesota Crookston – Golden Eagles
- University of Minnesota Duluth – Bulldogs
- Winona State University – Warriors

Bemidji State, Minnesota Duluth, Minnesota State, and St. Cloud State notably compete in Division I in men's and women's hockey. All four are members of the women's WCHA; Bemidji State and Minnesota State are also members of the men's WCHA but set to move to the new CCHA in 2021, with Minnesota–Duluth and St. Cloud State competing in the NCHC. Bemidji State University has won five NCAA Division II titles in men's hockey. Minnesota State has produced won 6 team and 49 individual national championships including men's hockey, women's softball. Minnesota Duluth has produced eight Division II and Division 1 titles, five in NCAA Division I Women's Hockey, one in NCAA Division I Men's Hockey, and two in NCAA Division II Football. Winona State has won two NCAA Division II in Men's Basketball titles. Concordia St. Paul has won nine NCAA Division II titles in Volleyball. Saint Cloud State was won two NCAA Division II titles in Wrestling. Minnesota Crookston, MSU Moorhead, and Southwest Minnesota State have not won any NCAA team titles.

=== Division III ===
The NCAA Division III teams in Minnesota play in one of two leagues, the Minnesota Intercollegiate Athletic Conference (MIAC) or the Upper Midwest Athletic Conference (UMAC).

Teams competing in the MIAC:

- Augsburg University – Auggies
- Bethel University – Royals
- Carleton College – Knights
- Concordia College, Moorhead – Cobbers
- Gustavus Adolphus College – Gusties
- Hamline University – Pipers
- Macalester College – Scots
- College of Saint Benedict – Blazers (women only)
- St. Catherine University – Wildcats (women only)
- St. John's University – Johnnies (men only)
- St. Mary's University – Cardinals
- St. Olaf College – Oles
- College of St. Scholastica – Saints

The MIAC was founded in 1920. Conference schools have won 48 total NCAA titles.

Teams competing in the UMAC:

- Bethany Lutheran College – Vikings
- Crown College – Storm
- Martin Luther College – Knights
- University of Minnesota Morris – Cougars
- North Central University – Rams
- University of Northwestern - St. Paul – Eagles

The UMAC was founded in 1972. The conference became an active NCAA Division III conference July 1, 2008. There are seven full member, six from Minnesota. All six Minnesota members are full Division III members.

== Olympians from Minnesota ==
The United States hockey team won the Olympic gold medal for ice hockey in 1980, coached by Minnesota native Herb Brooks. Eleven of the twenty players on the roster were from Minnesota. The team beat the long-dominant Soviet team in what has been called the Miracle on Ice, and went on to win the gold medal by defeating Finland.

The 1960 United States hockey team won the Olympic gold medal in the 1960 Winter Olympics. Six of the 18 members of that team were from Minnesota. The team beat the Canadian ice hockey team in the final game to secure the gold medal. A substantial number of players on the 1956 Olympic silver medal hockey team came from Minnesota. The 1948 Winter Olympics had a native Thief River Falls, MN member on the team. The majority of players on the 1972 Olympic silver medal hockey team came from Minnesota.

In the 2006 Winter Olympics, both the bronze medal U.S. men's and the women's curling teams came from the Bemidji Curling Club.

Bloomington native Tom Malchow won a gold medal at the 2000 Summer Olympics and a silver medal at the 1996 Summer Olympics in swimming.

Carrie Tollefson was on the 2004 Summer Olympic team as a distance runner and ranked 5th in 2006.

Minnesota was well represented in the 2008 Summer Olympics in Beijing, including Sada Jacobson (Rochester, Minnesota) already had won the bronze medal in the 2004 Summer Olympic games in sabre fencing.

Minnesota Lynx players were part of six consecutive and eight overall victories in women's basketball. Seimone Augustus, Sylvia Fowles, Maya Moore, Lindsay Whalen, and Katie Smith were among those who earned Team USA their gold medals.

Gymnast Sunisa Lee competed in the 2020 Summer Olympics and the 2024 Summer Olympics, winning a total of 6 medals, including 2 golds.

== Amateur sports ==
=== Baseball ===
Summer collegiate baseball is present in Minnesota with the SCBA-sanctioned Northwoods League. All players in the league must have NCAA eligibility remaining in order to participate, and therefore are not paid. Minnesota's Northwoods League teams are the Duluth Huskies, Mankato Moondogs, Rochester Honkers, St. Cloud Rox, and Willmar Stingers. The Northwoods League Offices are located in Rochester, Minnesota. There are also Northwoods League teams operating in Wisconsin, Iowa, Michigan, and Ontario, Canada.

The Fargo-Moorhead RedHawks are an American Association team founded in 1996 and based in Fargo, North Dakota. While not primarily based in Minnesota the team also includes fans from Moorhead, Minnesota. They won five Northern League titles in 1998, 2003, 2006, 2009 and 2010 (the last year of the league).

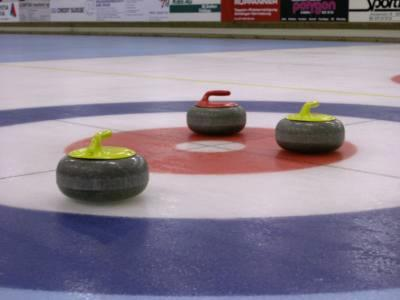
Curling Stones

Other Minor League Baseball teams associated with Minnesota include the Rochester Red Wings (AAA), the New Britain Rock Cats (AA), the Fort Myers Miracles (High-A), the Cedar Rapids Kernels (Low-A), the Elizabethton Twins (Rookie), the DSL Twins of the Dominican Summer League, and GCL Twins of the Gulf Coast League, all sponsored by the Minnesota Twins.

American Legion baseball is played throughout the state in summer.

=== Golf ===
Minnesota has more golfers per capita than any state in the U.S. Hazeltine National Golf Club played host to the 2006 U.S. Amateur.

=== Curling ===
In addition to the Bemidji Curling Club whose members competed in the 2006 Winter Olympics, there are over two dozen curling clubs in the state.

=== Roller derby ===
The Twin Cities is home to Minnesota Roller Derby (Saint Paul), North Star Roller Derby (Minneapolis) and Twin Cities Roller Derby (Minneapolis), as well as two junior derby leagues, Minnesota Junior Roller Derby (MNJRD) and Minnesota Frostbite.

Minnesota Roller Derby was founded in 2004 as the Minnesota RollerGirls, and were the fourth flat-track league to host a bout. Their venue for the first season was a roller rink in a northern Minneapolis suburb. After selling out all four bouts in their first season, they were approached by the City of Saint Paul, which connected them with the Roy Wilkins Auditorium, part of the RiverCentre Complex, making them the first modern roller derby league to play in a professional sports venue, and their first sellout set the modern roller derby attendance record of 4,900 (which was beaten the next month by the Rat City Rollergirls of Seattle, who had recently begun playing in the 15,000-seat KeyArena). The Minnesota RollerGirls are founding members of the Women's Flat-Track Derby Association (WFTDA), the main governing body for flat track roller derby, and have advanced to the WFTDA Championships in 2006, 2010, 2011, and 2012. Minnesota Roller Derby's training organization includes the adult training team Minnesota Windchill (formerly Debu-Taunts) and junior training team Minnesota Frostbite.

North Star Roller Derby was founded in 2006 as North Star Roller Girls, and played in a roller rink for two seasons before moving to the Minneapolis Convention Center. They joined the WFTDA in 2009, and competed in the North Central Regional Tournament in 2009 and 2010. In 2015, their primary venue changed to the Lee and Rose Warner Coliseum at the Minnesota State Fairgrounds, where they remain. Their secondary venues include Canterbury Park in Shakopee, Minnesota and the Minneapolis Convention Center. The league rebranded to North Star Roller Derby in 2017.

TCRD and MNJRD play in various venues around the Twin Cities. Twin Cities Roller Derby was founded in 2009 as Minnesota Men's Roller Derby, and rebranded in 2018.

=== Soccer ===
Every year in summer (generally in July) at Blaine's National Sports Center the Schwan's USA CUP is played. It is the largest international youth soccer tournament in North America with over 1,000 teams and participants from 22 countries.

The National Premier Soccer League expanded into Minnesota with a new division within the Midwest Conference called the NPSL North. This new division incorporates existing NPSL teams with expansion sides. NPSL North incorporates teams from the Minnesota as well as North Dakota, South Dakota, and Wisconsin. Minnesota teams include Duluth FC, Minneapolis City SC, Minnesota Twin Stars FC, Rochester Med City FC, and Viejos Son Los Trapos FC. The Inaugural season of NPSL North kicked off in 2017 with 8 teams.

Formed in 1953, the Minnesota Amateur Soccer League is one of several adult amateur soccer leagues in the state. MASL is considered the top sanctioned adult league, which features four divisions using the promotion-relegation system.

=== Bandy ===
Bandy in the USA is almost exclusively a Minnesota sport. All league matches are played on the largest artificial ice surface of the Western Hemisphere, Guidant John Rose Minnesota Oval in Roseville, venue of the 1995 Bandy World Championship and the 2006 Women's Bandy World Championship and 2016 Women's Bandy World Championship, even by the team from Duluth. Also rink bandy competitions are organized. The United States national bandy team is typically the 6th or the 7th best team in the world, thus often having finished either last in Group A or winning Group B of the Bandy World Championship. At the 2012 tournament they were praised for being better than ever before. However, it was not enough to avoid being relegated to Group B. With an increasing number of participating countries, from the 2014 tournament there are 8 countries in Group A, almost securing USA a permanent place for the foreseeable future.
