= St. Anna, Minnesota =

St. Anna
- Unincorporated community
- Location within Minnesota Location within the United States
- Coordinates: 45°39′42″N 94°28′31″W
- Country: United States
- State: Minnesota
- County: Stearns
- Township: Avon Township
- Elevation: 1,194 ft (364 m)
- Time zone: UTC-6 (Central (CST))
  - Summer (DST): UTC-5 (CDT)
- ZIP code: 56310
- Area code: 320
- GNIS feature ID: 650500

St. Anna is an unincorporated community in Avon Township, Stearns County, Minnesota, United States, near Avon and Albany. The community is located near the junction of Stearns County Roads 9 and 154. The community contains one property listed on the National Register of Historic Places: the 1902 Church of the Immaculate Conception.
