= Avon Township, Stearns County, Minnesota =

Avon Township, Minnesota
- Township
- Location within the state of Minnesota Avon Township, Minnesota (the United States)
- Coordinates: 45°37′N 94°27′W
- Country: United States
- State: Minnesota
- County: Stearns

Area
  - Total: 34.4 sq mi (89.2 km^{2})
  - Land: 31.9 sq mi (82.7 km^{2})
  - Water: 2.5 sq mi (6.5 km^{2})
- Elevation: 1,112 ft (339 m)

Population (2010)
  - Total: 2,294
  - Density: 71.8/sq mi (27.7/km^{2})
- Time zone: UTC-6 (Central (CST))
  - Summer (DST): UTC-5 (CDT)
- ZIP code: 56310
- Area code: 320
- FIPS code: 27-03088
- GNIS feature ID: 0663487
- Website: https://www.avontownshipmn.gov/

Avon Township is a township in Stearns County, Minnesota, United States. The population was 2,294 at the 2010 census. The township includes the city of Avon.

Avon Township was organized in 1866. The township contains one property listed on the National Register of Historic Places: the 1902 Church of the Immaculate Conception.

== Geography ==
According to the United States Census Bureau, the township (T125N R30W) has a total area of 34.4 square miles (89.2 km^{2}); 31.9 square miles (82.7 km^{2}) is land and 2.5 square miles (6.5 km^{2}), or 7.28%, is water.

Avon Township is located in Township 125 North of the Arkansas Base Line and Range 30 West of the 5th Principal Meridian.

== Demographics ==
As of the census of 2000, there were 2,132 people, 716 households, and 570 families residing in the township. The population density was 66.0 inhabitants per square mile (25.5/km^{2}). There were 769 housing units at an average density of 23.8 per square mile (9.2/km^{2}). The racial makeup of the township was 98.50% White, 0.05% African American, 0.09% Native American, 0.19% Asian, 0.94% from other races, and 0.23% from two or more races. Hispanic or Latino of any race were 2.72% of the population.

There were 716 households, out of which 43.4% had children under the age of 18 living with them, 70.3% were married couples living together, 4.7% had a female householder with no husband present, and 20.3% were non-families. 16.2% of all households were made up of individuals, and 5.0% had someone living alone who was 65 years of age or older. The average household size was 2.98 and the average family size was 3.35.

In the township the population was spread out, with 30.2% under the age of 18, 7.8% from 18 to 24, 30.5% from 25 to 44, 22.9% from 45 to 64, and 8.6% who were 65 years of age or older. The median age was 36 years. For every 100 females, there were 107.4 males. For every 100 females age 18 and over, there were 110.8 males.

The median income for a household in the township was $51,806, and the median income for a family was $56,078. Males had a median income of $35,992 versus $24,866 for females. The per capita income for the township was $19,944. About 5.3% of families and 7.0% of the population were below the poverty line, including 10.0% of those under age 18 and 3.0% of those age 65 or over.
