= Holdingford, Minnesota =

City in Minnesota, United States

Holdingford
- City
- One of many references to Lake Wobegon in Holdingford
- Nickname: Gateway to Lake Wobegon
- Motto: "Most Scenic Part Of The Lake Wobegon Trail"
- Location of Holdingford within Stearns County, Minnesota
- Coordinates: 45°43′49″N 94°28′17″W
- Country: United States
- State: Minnesota
- County: Stearns

Area
  - Total: 0.90 sq mi (2.33 km^{2})
  - Land: 0.90 sq mi (2.33 km^{2})
  - Water: 0 sq mi (0.00 km^{2})
- Elevation: 1,188 ft (362 m)

Population (2020)
  - Total: 743
  - Density: 825.5/sq mi (318.74/km^{2})
- Time zone: UTC-6 (Central (CST))
  - Summer (DST): UTC-5 (CDT)
- ZIP code: 56340
- Area code: 320
- FIPS code: 27-29582
- GNIS feature ID: 2394399
- Website: https://www.holdingford.gov/

Holdingford is a city in Stearns County, Minnesota, United States. As of the 2020 census, Holdingford had a population of 743. It calls itself "The Gateway to Lake Wobegon", the fictional central Minnesota town created by Garrison Keillor.

Holdingford is part of the St. Cloud Metropolitan Statistical Area.

== History ==
Historian of U.S. religious architecture Marilyn J. Chiat wrote of early settlement in the region, "Father Francis X. Pierz, a missionary to Indians in central Minnesota, published a series of articles in 1851 in German Catholic newspapers advocating Catholic settlement in central Minnesota. Large numbers of immigrants, mainly German, but also Slovenian and Polish, responded. Over 20 parishes where formed in what is now Stearns County, each centered on a church-oriented hamlet. As the farmers prospered, the small frame churches were replaced by more substantial buildings of brick or stone... Stearns County retains in its German character and is still home to one of the largest rural Catholic populations in Anglo-America."

Holdingford was platted in the 1870s by Randolph Holding on a site near a ford. A post office has been in operation at Holdingford since 1872. According to local historian Vincent Yzermans, the earliest settlers and founders of St. Mary's Church were Irish-Americans and Canadian Gaelic-speaking immigrants from Sight Point, Cape Mabou, Cape Breton, Nova Scotia. Holdingford was originally called the "Scotch Settlement." Its Scottish-Canadian pioneers include descendants of Clan Stewart, Clan MacArthur, Clan Campbell, Clan Kennedy, and Clan MacPherson.

In an interview with Reverend Alex D. MacDonald for the book Mabou Pioneers, one elderly Holdingford settler recalled, "As I look back, I can remember they were a jolly group of people, and when all their children were born, they made quite a gathering when they were all together at parties in their different homes, with singing of Scottish songs, violin music, and of course, dancing Scottish reels."

The Highland Scottish dancing at local ceilidhs was often "a source of scandal" to their German neighbors. Despite the later Germanisation and Polonisation of both parishes in Holdingford, Yzermans often heard the famous lines from the Canadian Boat Song quoted in later years by the descendants of the Holdingford Scottish-Americans who had stayed:

From the lone shieling of the misty island
Mountains divide us and the waste of seas
But still the blood is strong, the heart is Highland
And we in dreams behold the Hebrides.

The Holdingford area was ethnically polarized between German- and Polish-Americans. Until assimilation lessened the mutual distrust, they attended different Catholic parishes and only rarely intermarried. The area remains a center of traditional German and Polish folk music and of the speaking in local homes of both Silesian and "Stearns County German".

During the 1880s and '90s, a small farming colony of Slovaks and Rusyns migrated from the Austro-Hungarian Empire via Pennsylvania and settled on homesteads northeast of Holdingford. The immigrants were mainly Roman Catholics, or Byzantine Catholics from the Slovak Greek Catholic Church or the Ruthenian Greek Catholic Church, but enough converted to the Russian Orthodox Church that, with the assistance of Fr. John Maliarevsky from St. Mary's Cathedral in Minneapolis, they built St. Mary's Russian Orthodox Church around 1897. In 1886, local converts to Protestantism under the influence of visiting theology student John Sabol founded the Slovak Congregational Church, locally called "the Country Church", which still stands across a country road from the former site of St. Mary's Orthodox Church.

In 1902, Bishop Tikhon, the future Patriarch of Moscow, traveled from Minneapolis to bless the first completed Orthodox Church. While still a seminarian, Vasily Basalyga, who later became the Head of the Japanese Orthodox Church, also served at St. Mary's Russian Orthodox Church in Holdingford as a Reader and schoolteacher. The parish altar lamp was a personal gift from Tsar Nicholas II.

During the 1920s and '30s, Russian Orthodox priests from Holdingford sometimes made missionary visits to Rusyn Americans living in a similar farming settlement in Browerville, Minnesota. They made some converts, but not many. The Divine Liturgy was still offered in the traditional Old Church Slavonic liturgical language and only in 1978 did the Orthodox Church in America, which supplied the Orthodox priests who still visited St. Mary's, switch to Elizabethan English. In August 1978, the 14th-century Wonder Working Icon of the Our Lady of Tikhvin was brought for veneration from Holy Trinity Cathedral in Chicago to St. Mary's Russian Orthodox Church in Holdingford by Archbishop John of Chicago and Minneapolis. As of 1985, Orthodox laity continued to attend services from the surrounding communities of Bowlus, Upsala, Browerville, and St. Cloud. During the late 1980s, the parish "metrical books" were transferred to the Cathedral in Minneapolis and the Church was closed. Chiat described the empty church as "a small white Gothic Revival building crowned with a tin onion dome, a rare sight on the edge of a cornfield in Minnesota." In 2002, a family with roots in the parish removed the bell from St. Mary's and donated it to Holy Myrrh Bearers Orthodox Church in St. Cloud.

The only priest who lies buried in St. Mary's Roman Catholic Church cemetery in Holdingford is H. William Wilkens. According to his 1914 obituaries, Wilkens was a member of the Belgian nobility from Namur and a former seminary professor in Galveston, Texas. After concerns about his health forced a transfer to the Roman Catholic Diocese of St. Cloud, he served at a series of local parishes. He also became well known locally as a highly intelligent German-language essayist on religious and philosophical topics and a regular contributor to Der Nordstern.

=== World War I ===
Like other Stearns County German- and Polish-American communities, the Holdingford area opposed American entry into the First World War, but produced many local recruits and draftees once America declared war on Imperial Germany in May 1917. In November 1917, the largely German-American parish of St. Mary's heard a "very impressive sermon" on American patriotism by Fr. Scheuer followed by the presentation of the parish's service flag, which bore 15 stars in honor of each of the young men from the parish who were serving in the United States military. America's Independence Day 1918 was the largest ever seen in Holdingford, beginning with a Requiem Mass at St. Hedwig's Church for the fallen soldiers of the Allied Armies, followed by a dinner served at noon by the women of the parish. Five Holdingford-area Doughboys lost their lives while serving in the American Expeditionary Forces (AEF): Private Nicholas Heinz, who died on 13 September 1918 from wounds received in the 2 September capture of a German machine gun nest near Vilcey-sur-Trey, for which he was posthumously awarded the Distinguished Service Cross; Ernest Roehrs, who died of influenza on September 29, 1918, at Camp Funston, Kansas; Gregor Hartung, killed in action in France in October 1918; John Elkanic, killed in action on 22 October 1918 and buried in the Oise-Aisne American Cemetery and Memorial; and Private Francis Feia, killed in action in the fall of 1918. Feia's parents received definitive word of his death only on 12 July 1919. A Tridentine Requiem Mass was offered for Feia at St Hedwig's Church on 21 July 1919. Holdingford's American Legion Post #211 was later named in his honor.

=== Prohibition era ===
During Prohibition, Holdingford earned the title of "moonshine capital of Minnesota". According to historian Elaine Davis, this was because organized crime figures from the Twin Cities, Chicago, and Kansas City made frequent trips to the area to purchase Minnesota 13, a high-quality moonshine distilled locally by Polish- and German-American farmers with the collusion of corrupt local politicians and law enforcement.

In October 1923, four Stearns County residents, including mobbed up County Commissioner Val Herman, were arrested by Federal Prohibition Enforcement Agents after an extremely violent car chase between the Pitzl Brewery in New Munich and Holdingford. The other suspects were Stanley Dobis of St. Anna and Albin Bohmer and Joseph Sigmeth of Avon, Minnesota. All were held in Minneapolis pending trial on federal charges of violating the Volstead Act.

According to Yzermans, during the Prohibition era, "a popular little ditty was being sung and hummed along the highways and byways of Holding Township":

Mother makes brandy from cherries;
Pop distills whiskey and gin;
Sister sells wine from the grapes on our vine—
Good grief, how the money rolls in!

In June 1933, Clarence Olson, alias Tuffy, a bootlegger and gangster based in Eagle Bend, Minnesota, who, according to The Long Prairie Leader, "has long had a reputation as a liquor runner and hijacker and who has been claimed by many to be the toughest man between Minneapolis and Duluth", met his destiny in a Holdingford area gunfight. After arriving with two associates at the farmhouse of Holdingford bootleggers Joseph and Anthony Dzierweczynski to buy 85 gallons of Minnesota 13, Olson first announced that the Dzierweczynskis would now be paid in cash. Then he and his enforcer Harley Buchan drew their sidearms and announced that they intended to take to 85 gallons of moonshine for free. Joseph Dzierweczynski fled and returned with a loaded shotgun. As he and Buchan ran to their escape vehicle, Olson received two fatal shotgun blasts in the back. After an investigation by the Stearns and Todd County Sheriff's Departments, Olson's two surviving enforcers and the Dzierweczynski brothers were arrested pending criminal charges.

According to the Long Prairie Leader, "Tuffy Olson has for years had a reputation of being a booze runner who has had many conflicts with the law. At the time of his death, a Federal charge of illegal possession of liquor was hanging over his head, the trial being scheduled for later in the year. It is alleged that he peddled liquor at dance halls over a wide area and other rumors credit him with having hijacked many liquor runners in this section of the State."

=== World War II ===
After the 1941 entry of the United States into the Second World War, young men from every ethnic background in Holding Township volunteered for the United States military. In April 1944, Holdingford native Private Walter Krystosek was killed in action at the Anzio landing. On New Year's Day 1945, Clarence Scepaniak, a paratrooper serving in the European Theater with the 17th Airborne Division, was taken prisoner by the enemy. After being held as a POW in conditions that traumatized him for the rest of his life at Stalag IV-B, Scepaniak was liberated and returned to Holdingford. He remained silent about his experiences until finally giving an interview about them in 1985. In 2017, the remains of United States Navy Fireman First Class Elmer Kerestes, a Holdingford native killed in action aboard the U.S.S. Oklahoma during the attack on Pearl Harbor, were posthumously identified through DNA testing by the Defense POW/MIA Accounting Agency and returned to his family for burial. Kerestes's 25-mile funeral route from Melrose to Holdingford was lined with local people paying their respects as his American flag-draped casket passed. According to attendee Jed Konsor, “When I see that casket draped in the American flag, that says something to me. That says that guy fought for us. Died for us. That's why we are here today." Kerestes was buried next to his parents in Holdingford with full military honors.

== Geography ==
According to the United States Census Bureau, the city has an area of 0.85 square miles (2.20 km^{2}), all land.

Some say that Lake Wobegon is near Holdingford

Holdingford is nine miles north of Avon at Interstate 94. Albany is also nearby.

== Demographics ==
Historical population
Census	Pop.	Note	%±
1900	191		—
1910	276		44.5%
1920	507		83.7%
1930	477		−5.9%
1940	527		10.5%
1950	458		−13.1%
1960	526		14.8%
1970	551		4.8%
1980	635		15.2%
1990	561		−11.7%
2000	736		31.2%
2010	708		−3.8%
2020	743		4.9%
U.S. Decennial Census

=== 2020 census ===
As of the census of 2020, there were 743 people, 316 households, and 188 families living in the city. The population density was 825.5 inhabitants per square mile (318.7/km²). There were 336 housing units at an average density of 373.3 per square mile (144.1/km²). The racial makeup of the city was 96.5% White, 0.7% Black or African American, 0.1% Pacific Islander, 0.8% from some other race, and 1.9% from two or more races. Hispanic or Latino of any race were 0.9% of the population.

There were 316 households, of which 31.0% had children under the age of 18 living with them, 42.4% were married couples living together, 4.1% had a female householder with no spouse present, 2.2% had a male householder with no spouse present, and 40.5% were non-families. 33.5% of all households were made up of individuals, and 22.8% had someone living alone who was 65 years of age or older. The average household size was 2.35.

The median age in the city was 35.4 years. 27.2% of residents were under the age of 18; 9.2% were between the ages of 18 and 24; 25.7% were from 25 to 44; 23.4% were from 45 to 64; and 14.5% were 65 years of age or older. The gender makeup of the city was 50.7% male and 49.3% female.

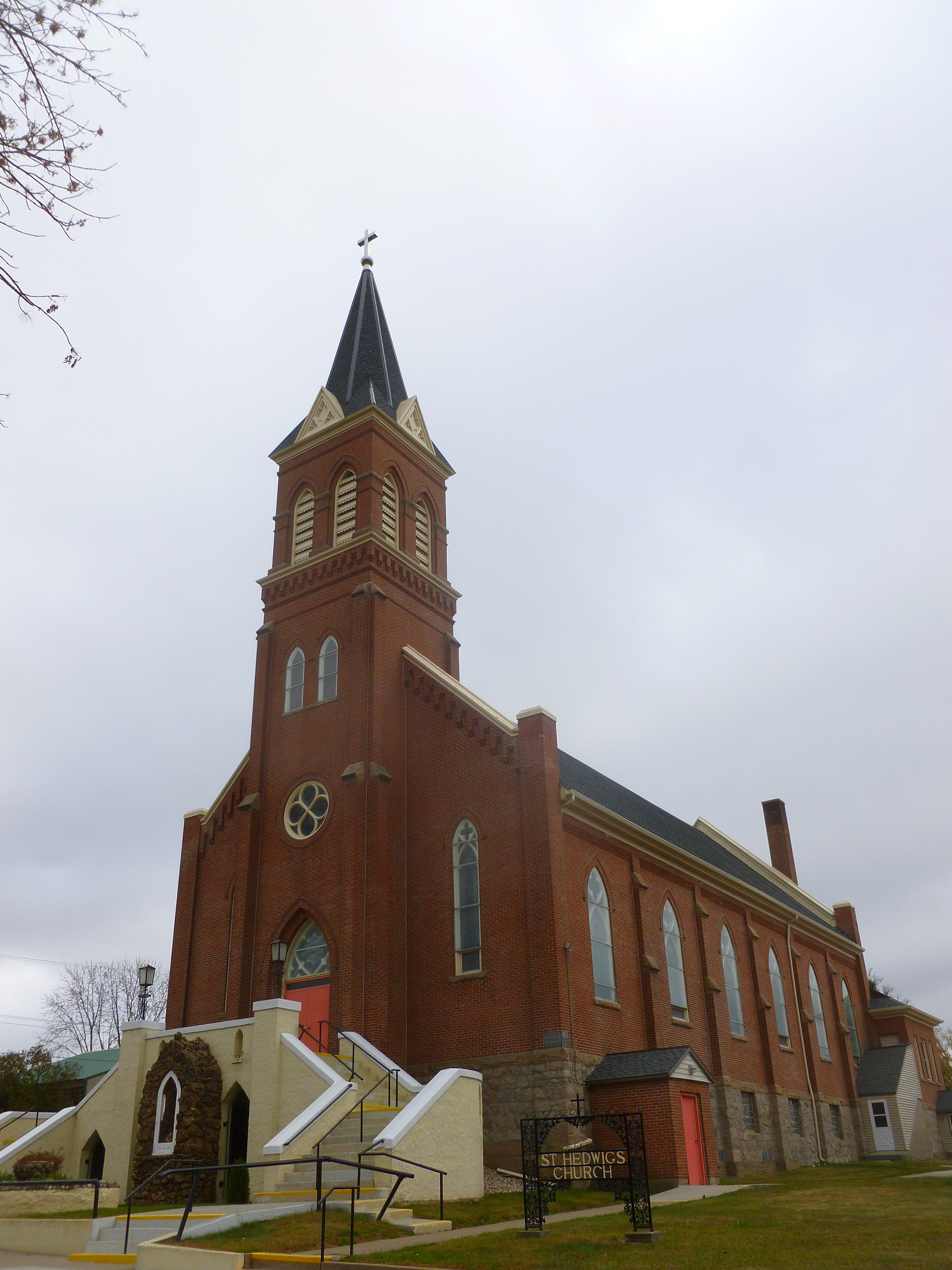
All Saints Catholic Church (St. Hedwig's Church)

=== 2010 census ===
As of the census of 2010, there were 708 people, 306 households, and 190 families living in the city. The population density was 832.9 inhabitants per square mile (321.6/km^{2}). There were 330 housing units at an average density of 388.2 per square mile (149.9/km^{2}). The racial makeup of the city was 98.6% White, 0.1% Asian, 0.4% Pacific Islander, and 0.8% from two or more races. Hispanic or Latino of any race were 0.7% of the population.

There were 306 households, of which 29.7% had children under the age of 18 living with them, 44.8% were married couples living together, 9.8% had a female householder with no husband present, 7.5% had a male householder with no wife present, and 37.9% were non-families. 32.4% of all households were made up of individuals, and 14% had someone living alone who was 65 years of age or older. The average household size was 2.31 and the average family size was 2.92.

The median age in the city was 37.3 years. 25.8% of residents were under the age of 18; 7.5% were between the ages of 18 and 24; 25.1% were from 25 to 44; 25.2% were from 45 to 64; and 16.2% were 65 years of age or older. The gender makeup of the city was 50.7% male and 49.3% female.

=== 2000 census ===
As of the census of 2000, there were 736 people, 286 households, and 197 families living in the city. The population density was 1,182.1 inhabitants per square mile (456.4/km^{2}). There were 297 housing units at an average density of 477.0 per square mile (184.2/km^{2}). The racial makeup of the city was 99.18% White, 0.54% Asian, and 0.27% from two or more races. Hispanic or Latino of any race were 0.14% of the population.

There were 286 households, out of which 32.2% had children under the age of 18 living with them, 51.4% were married couples living together, 12.9% had a female householder with no husband present, and 31.1% were non-families. 27.3% of all households were made up of individuals, and 16.8% had someone living alone who was 65 years of age or older. The average household size was 2.55 and the average family size was 3.13.

In the city, the population was spread out, with 27.6% under the age of 18, 9.8% from 18 to 24, 23.5% from 25 to 44, 20.2% from 45 to 64, and 18.9% who were 65 years of age or older. The median age was 38 years. For every 100 females, there were 95.7 males. For every 100 females age 18 and over, there were 91.7 males.

The median income for a household in the city was $34,000, and the median income for a family was $42,788. Males had a median income of $31,053 versus $21,141 for females. The per capita income for the city was $15,410. About 6.2% of families and 11.2% of the population were below the poverty line, including 13.9% of those under age 18 and 9.2% of those age 65 or over.

== Education ==
Holdingford Public Schools are part of the Holdingford Public School District. Schools in the district include Holdingford Elementary School and Holdingford High School. Holdingford Elementary serves preschool to 6th grade, and Holdingford High School serves grades 7–12. The Holdingford Huskers are expanding in athletics. They have baseball/softball, volleyball, football, basketball, tennis, swimming, track, wrestling, and cheerleading.

== Infrastructure ==
=== Transportation ===
Stearns County Road 9 (4th Street), Stearns County Road 17 (River Street), and Main Street are three of the main routes in the community.

Holdingford is home to the longest covered bridge in Minnesota. The bridge is along the Lake Wobegon Trail extension that runs from Albany past Holdingford. It is 186 feet (57 m) long and was built in 2008 by the Holdingford Lions club. Each May since 2008, runners in the Lake Wobegon Trail Marathon start in Holdingford before running 26.2 miles south on the trail to St. Joseph.

== Notable people ==
- Kenny Benkowski, professional wrestler better known as "Sodbuster" Kenny Jay, was born in Holdingford.
- Joseph Brinkman, former Major League Baseball Umpire - raised in Holdingford
