= Lake Wobegon Trails =

Rail trails in Minnesota, United States

Coordinates: 45°39′22″N 94°33′33″W

Lake Wobegon Trail
- Length: 85 kilometres (53 miles)
- Location: Minnesota
- Use: Hiking
- Elevation gain/loss: 322 m (1,056 ft)
- Difficulty: Easy

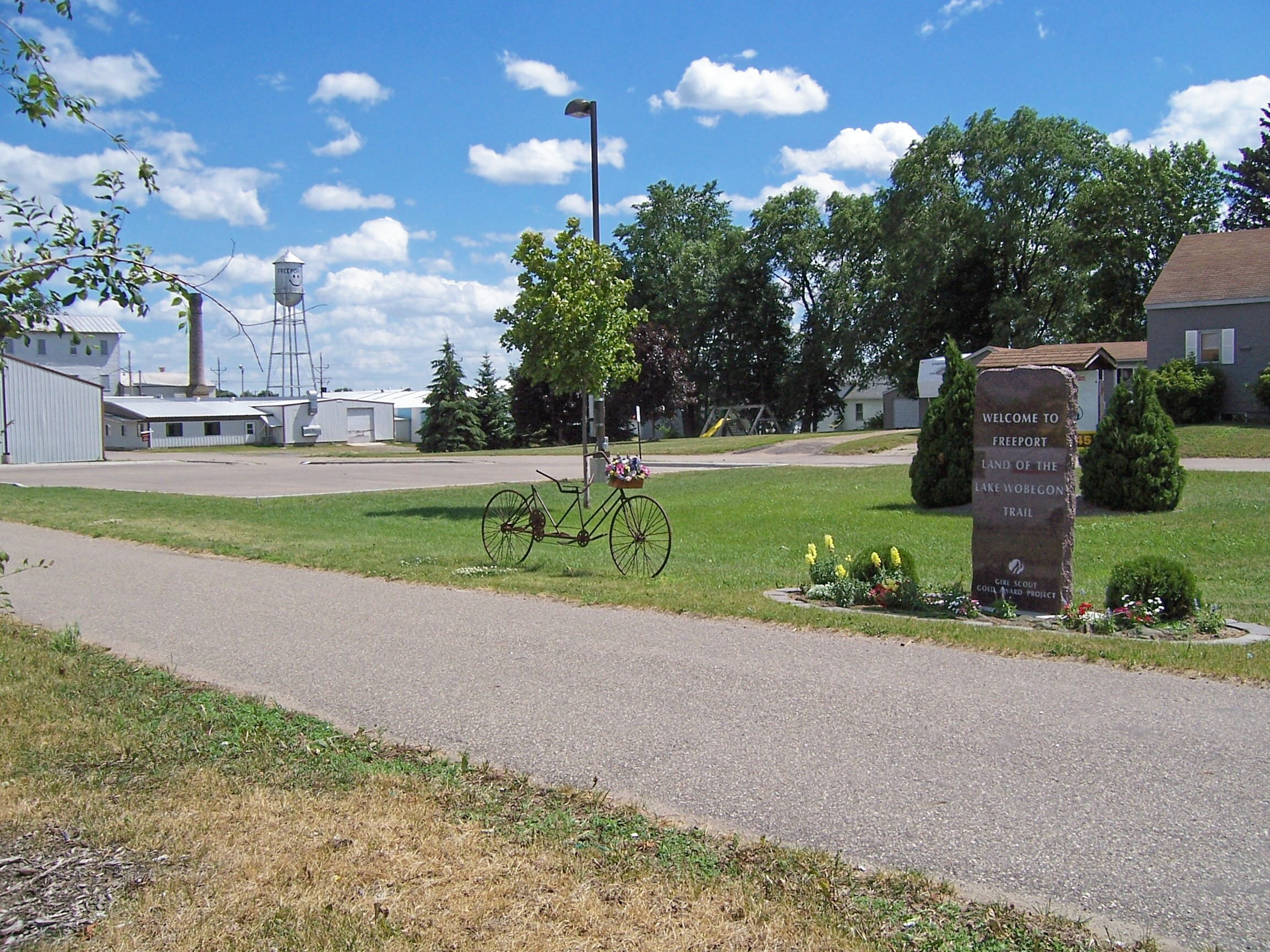
A marker along the trail in Freeport donated by a local Girl Scout chapter.

The Lake Wobegon Trail are two paved recreational rail trails in central Minnesota, named after the fictional Lake Wobegon in Garrison Keillor's "Prairie Home Companion". Each trail is marked with mileposts every 0.5 miles (0.80 km), corresponding with the mile markers of the former railroad lines. Snowmobile use is allowed on the trail in winter, conditions permitting.

== Main trail ==
The main trail is a 62-mile (100 km) trail along a former Burlington Northern Railroad line, beginning near milepost 81 in St. Joseph and ending near milepost 130 in Osakis. This trail runs parallel to I-94. The trail passes through the cities of Avon, Albany, Freeport, Melrose, Sauk Centre, and West Union. Beyond Osakis, the trail continues as the Central Lakes Trail. These two trails form a continuous trail from St. Joseph to Fergus Falls. The extension trail intersects near milepost 97 of the main trail in Albany.

=== Extension trail ===
The extension trail is a 13-mile (21 km) trail along a former Soo Line Railroad line, beginning near milepost 131 in Albany passing through Albany, Krain and Holding Townships and ending 3 miles (4.8 km) northeast of Holdingford at approx. milepost 143.5, passing through Holdingford. This bicycle trail continues beyond milepost 143.5 as the Soo Line Trail, crossing the Mississippi River at the Blanchard Dam, changing from asphalt to gravel at U.S. 10 south of Little Falls, and extending to Onamia. The Soo Line Trail traverses Morrison County and Mille Lacs County. The extension is home to the longest covered bridge in Minnesota, located near Holdingford.

=== Saintly Seven ===
The Saintly Seven is a completed 7 mile extension to bring the trail from St. Joseph all the way into Waite Park and Saint Cloud. The extension allows commuters in St. Cloud a way to safely navigate some of the busier roads, as well as allowing a connection to the wider Wobegon and Mississippi trails. The extension is compared to the Minneapolis Greenway.

== Events ==
=== Running ===
- Lake Wobegon Trail Marathon - An annual marathon that takes place along the trail in the Spring. The race runs from Holdingford High School to St. Joseph. There were 339 finishers in 2015.
- Holdingford Daze 5k - An annual 5k that occurs the Saturday morning of Holdingford daze. The run is a fundraiser for the Holdingford Husker's cross country team. Participants are bussed out to a spot along the trail and then run back to the town to finish at the Holdingford trailhead.

=== Biking ===
- Caramel Roll Ride - Ride that occurs the 2nd Saturday in June
- Lady Slipper Nature Ride - Ride that occurs the 3rd Saturday in June
- Caramel Apple Ride - Ride that occurs the 1st Saturday after labor Day

== See also ==
- List of rail trails
- List of cycleways
