= Church of the Immaculate Conception (St. Anna, Minnesota) =

Historic church in Minnesota, United States

- U.S. National Register of Historic Places
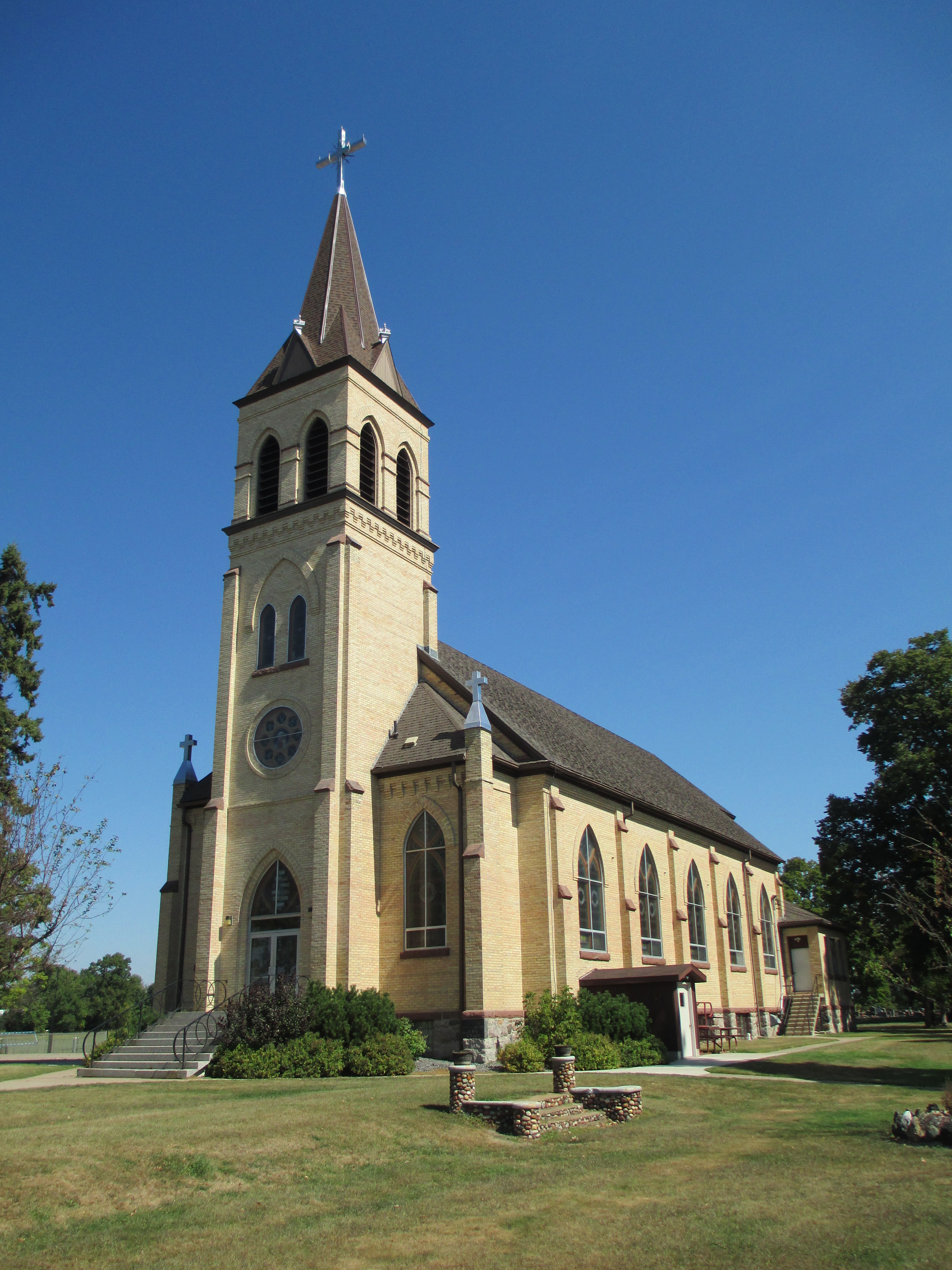
- The Church of the Immaculate Conception viewed from the southwest

- Location within Minnesota Location within the United States
- Location: 37186 County Road 9, St. Anna, Minnesota
- Coordinates: 45°39′42″N 94°28′30″W
- Area: 2.5 acres (1.0 ha)
- Built: 1902
- Architectural style: Romanesque Revival
- MPS: Ethnic Hamlet Churches–Stearns County Catholic Settlement Churches TR
- NRHP reference No.: 82003038
- Added to NRHP: April 15, 1982

The Church of the Immaculate Conception is a historic Roman Catholic church building in the unincorporated community of St. Anna, Minnesota, United States. It is part of the Roman Catholic Diocese of Saint Cloud. The church was constructed in 1902 in a rural community settled by Polish immigrants. It was listed on the National Register of Historic Places in 1982 for its state-level significance in the themes of architecture, exploration/settlement, and religion. It was nominated for reflecting the settlement of rural Stearns County by Catholic immigrant groups clustered in small, ethnic hamlets dominated by a central church.

== History ==
St. Anna was established on the shore of Pelican Lake by Catholic immigrants from Poland. Their first church, a small wood-frame building, was built in 1887. It was completely destroyed by fire in June 1902. A new building, of yellow brick, was constructed in the winter of 1902 and dedicated in October 1903.

Immaculate Conception is part of a cluster of three parishes known as the Two Rivers Catholic Community. The other parishes are St. Stanislaus Kostka in Bowlus and All Saints in Holdingford.

== See also ==
- List of Catholic churches in the United States
- National Register of Historic Places listings in Stearns County, Minnesota
