= Lake Wobegon Trail Marathon =

- 2021 Lake Wobegon Trail Marathon logo
- Date: May 9, 2026
- Location: Holdingford, Minnesota to St. Joseph, Minnesota
- Event type: Paved Trail
- Distance: 26.2 miles (42.2 km)
- Primary sponsor: Centracare Clinic
- Established: 2008
- Course records: Men: 2:25:40 (2025); Jacob Vander Plaats; Women: 2:58:13 (2016); Amy Feit
- Website: lakewobegontrailmarathon.org
- Participants: 300+

The Lake Wobegon Trail Marathon is a 26.2 mile foot race from Holdingford, Minnesota, to St. Joseph, Minnesota, on a paved trail called the Lake Wobegon Trail. The course is USATF-certified, making it a qualifying race for the Boston Marathon. The race is sponsored and organized by the St. Cloud River Runners, a running group active since 1983 with about 150 members.

== Course ==
The flat, straight course is run on a blacktop trail converted from freight rail lines. After starting at the high school in Holdingford, the route quickly links to the Lake Wobegon Trail and goes southwest to the small town of Albany. On the outskirts of the town, the trail turns directly east and passes over the South Branch of Two Rivers, past two smaller lakes and a state-designated science and nature area. The path continues through farm land and then over the small gap of land between Middle Spunk Lake and Lower Spunk Lake on the east side of Avon. The course passes two more lakes before finishing in St. Joseph.

The Lake Wobegon Trail is maintained by the Stearns County Parks, local trail groups, the Minnesota Department of Transportation and the seven cities through which it passes.

The trail is named after a fictional region in Minnesota that appears in author and radio personality Garrison Keillor's stories. He has called the trail one of "ordinary beauty," a landscape of farms, woodland patches and small town-Americana.

== History ==
Two St. Cloud River Runners initially launched the event: Sartell teacher Joe Perske and St. Cloud lawyer Sharon Hobbs. They gained the support of local community members and mayors, and in the 2008 inaugural race, 80 runners finished. By 2010, the number of participants had grown to 200.

The course record for the marathon was set in 2025 by Jacob Vander Plaats, who ran it in 2:25:40. The race was first run in 2008, when 80 people from 12 states and Canada registered. The first race was sponsored by the St. Cloud-based law firm Rinke-Noonan. More recently, the race has seen a steady registration in the 400 runner range. The race is capped at 450 runners, according to 2018 race director George Bienusa.

A tragedy took place during the race in 2011, when a 35-year-old man from Byron, Minnesota, collapsed after finishing and suffered a cardiac arrest. Medical personnel attended to him, but he died.

In May 2016, the 216-foot wooden-planked bridge at Schwinghammer Lake was set aflame by an arsonist, but a quick response by a bicyclist and fire fighters kept the bridge structurally sound, and the marathon did not have to be rerouted.

On April 2, 2020, more than a month before the May 9 race date, the race officials canceled the 12th running of the marathon due to the COVID-19 pandemic. In a press release, the marathon organizers said they would "join numerous other events in an attempt to protect runners, volunteers and emergency medical personnel by putting [participants'] health and safety first."

As the 2021 race approached, Minnesotans reached nearly 50 percent vaccination rate for adults. The race directors decided to run the race with a staggered start and a 250-participant cap, per the Minnesota Department of Health recommendations. It would be the first road marathon back in the state since the Mankato Marathon on Oct. 12, 2019. The week of the Lake Wobegon race, Governor Tim Walz issued new guidelines that stated wearing masks wasn't necessary while with groups of less than 500 people outdoors. The guidelines also dropped limits on the number of people allowed in outdoor gatherings. The race, which was labeled a Road Runners Club state championship, saw faster than average times, with the top three marking the fourth-, fifth- and sixth-all-time fastest runs on the course since its inception in 2008.

== Marathon race results ==
Key: Course record

All cities in Minnesota unless indicated otherwise

	Men					Women					
Year	Place	Name	Age	Hometown	Time	Year	Place	Name	Age	Hometown	Time
2025	1st place, gold medalist(s)	Jacob Vander Plaats	25	Sioux City	2:25:40	2025	1st place, gold medalist(s)	Maggie Marx	37	South Haven	3:06:50
2025	2nd place, silver medalist(s)	Ben Johnson	39	Minneapolis	2:39:42	2025	2nd place, silver medalist(s)	Katie Zirbes	43	Rochester	3:07:37
2025	3rd place, bronze medalist(s)	Bailey Vande Griend	25	Sioux Falls	2:43:10	2025	3rd place, bronze medalist(s)	Amy Gunderson	44	Savage	3:08:26
2024	1st place, gold medalist(s)	Josh Peterson	27	Cold Spring	2:34:55	2024	1st place, gold medalist(s)	Heather Camp	44	Mankato	3:04:47
2024	2nd place, silver medalist(s)	Ben Johnson	38	Minneapolis	2:38:04	2024	2nd place, silver medalist(s)	Amy Gunderson	43	Savage	3:05:10
2024	3rd place, bronze medalist(s)	Brian Valentini	40	Minneapolis	2:41:32	2024	3rd place, bronze medalist(s)	Maggie Marx	36	New Haven	3:07:35
2023	1st place, gold medalist(s)	Ben Johnson	37	Minneapolis	2:47:35	2023	1st place, gold medalist(s)	Katie Zirbes	35	Le Sueur	3:15:30
2023	2nd place, silver medalist(s)	Matthew Axelrod	31	Saint Paul	2:55:53	2023	2nd place, silver medalist(s)	Margaret Irvin	40	Durham, North Carolina	3:19:13
2023	3rd place, bronze medalist(s)	Stephen Woods	32	Avon	2:57:13	2023	3rd place, bronze medalist(s)	Laura Parson	40	Fargo, North Dakota	3:27:35
2022	1st place, gold medalist(s)	John Schreier	32	Minneapolis	2:50:28	2022	1st place, gold medalist(s)	Kristen Giombi	36	Raleigh, North Carolina	3:15:37
2022	2nd place, silver medalist(s)	David Armstrong	40	Richardson, Texas	3:00:17	2022	2nd place, silver medalist(s)	Leah Knowles	24	Shakopee	3:16:39
2022	3rd place, bronze medalist(s)	Jerod Honrath	48	Dallas, Texas	3:06:24	2022	3rd place, bronze medalist(s)	Wanda Gau	59	Little Falls	3:18:27
2021	1st place, gold medalist(s)	Brandon Reihm	26	Annandale	2:36:17	2021	1st place, gold medalist(s)	Kacy Rodamaker	23	Minneapolis	3:13:23
2021	2nd place, silver medalist(s)	Evan Richardson	34	Byron	2:37:23	2021	2nd place, silver medalist(s)	Wanda Gau	58	Little Falls	3:14:06
2021	3rd place, bronze medalist(s)	Braden Richardson	35	Byron	2:38:05	2021	3rd place, bronze medalist(s)	Katie Zirbes	33	Hutchinson	3:17:16
2020		Race canceled due to COVID-19 pandemic				2020		Race canceled due to COVID-19 pandemic			
2019	1st place, gold medalist(s)	Dan Feda	44	Rochester	2:45:30	2019	1st place, gold medalist(s)	Cathleen Gross	25	Eagan	3:03:02
2019	2nd place, silver medalist(s)	Justin Wirth	38	Annandale	2:52:22	2019	2nd place, silver medalist(s)	Wanda Gau	56	Little Falls	3:12:47
2019	3rd place, bronze medalist(s)	Christopher Frank	47	Winnipeg, Canada	2:53:29	2019	3rd place, bronze medalist(s)	Rachel Turi	23	St. Paul	3:19:10
2018	1st place, gold medalist(s)	Braden Richardson	33	Byron	2:45:52	2018	1st place, gold medalist(s)	Wanda Gau	55	Little Falls	3:05:43
2018	2nd place, silver medalist(s)	William McGinnis	38	Madison, South Dakota	2:54:44	2018	2nd place, silver medalist(s)	Rachel Rice	38	Durham, North Carolina	3:12:54
2018	3rd place, bronze medalist(s)	Bryan Larison	34	Minneapolis	2:55:06	2018	3rd place, bronze medalist(s)	Sarah Schmidt-Dannert	18	Shoreview	3:19:16
2017	1st place, gold medalist(s)	Eric Giandelone	38	St. Paul	2:45:00	2017	1st place, gold medalist(s)	Cheryl Jeseritz	38	Savage	3:07:07
2017	2nd place, silver medalist(s)	Ethan Komoroski	25	Minneapolis	2:50:56	2017	2nd place, silver medalist(s)	Elaina Schellhaass	30	St. Louis Park	3:11:13
2017	3rd place, bronze medalist(s)	Bob Fudurich	38	Mounds View	2:52:45	2017	3rd place, bronze medalist(s)	Brianna Rohne	33	St. Paul	3:11:45
2016	1st place, gold medalist(s)	Steven Pekarek	35	Royalton	2:39:29	2016	1st place, gold medalist(s)	Amy Feit	36	Luverne	2:58:13
2016	2nd place, silver medalist(s)	Andrew Zachman	19	Holdingford	2:49:30	2016	2nd place, silver medalist(s)	Amy Omann	37	Chanhassen	3:01:17
2016	3rd place, bronze medalist(s)	Matthew Fisher	37	Austin, Texas	2:53:11	2016	3rd place, bronze medalist(s)	Elaina Schellhaass	29	St. Louis Park	3:08:16
2015	1st place, gold medalist(s)	Chad Lutz	29	Stow, Ohio	2:33:59	2015	1st place, gold medalist(s)	Nancy Buselmeier	31	Buffalo	3:00:15
2015	2nd place, silver medalist(s)	Reid Singer	29	Santa Fe, New Mexico	2:45:43	2015	2nd place, silver medalist(s)	Brianna Rohne	31	St. Paul	3:03:27
2015	3rd place, bronze medalist(s)	Adam Nyseth	35	Plymouth	2:54:15	2015	3rd place, bronze medalist(s)	Wanda Gau	52	Little Falls	3:04:57
2014	1st place, gold medalist(s)	Justin Gillette	31	Goshen, Indiana	2:42:59	2014	1st place, gold medalist(s)	Brianna Rohne	30	St. Paul	3:04:27
2014	2nd place, silver medalist(s)	Ben Bruce	30	Waubun	2:50:07	2014	2nd place, silver medalist(s)	Wanda Gau	51	Little Falls	3:07:39
2014	3rd place, bronze medalist(s)	Douglas Lange	44	Stillwater	2:50:51	2014	3rd place, bronze medalist(s)	Brooke Rasmussen	18	Big Lake	3:12:18
2013	1st place, gold medalist(s)	Jordan Hanlon	29	Minneapolis	2:38:19	2013	1st place, gold medalist(s)	Brittany Opatz	27	Waconia	3:02:59
2013	2nd place, silver medalist(s)	Ben Bruce	29	Waubun	2:44:15	2013	2nd place, silver medalist(s)	Brianna Rohne	29	St. Paul	3:15:25
2013	3rd place, bronze medalist(s)	Jesse Rueckert	33	St. Cloud	2:52:41	2013	3rd place, bronze medalist(s)	Jodi Nelson-Ryan	45	Sartell	3:24:26
2012	1st place, gold medalist(s)	Jordan Hanlon	28	Minneapolis	2:35:23	2012	1st place, gold medalist(s)	Paula Marozas	24	Little Falls	3:06:03
2012	2nd place, silver medalist(s)	Gerad Mead	32	St. Paul	2:36:01	2012	2nd place, silver medalist(s)	Marey Erickson	25	Waite Park	3:22:07
2012	3rd place, bronze medalist(s)	Nate Hoffman	29	Annandale	2:42:26	2012	3rd place, bronze medalist(s)	Wanda Gau	49	Little Falls	3:22:43
2011	1st place, gold medalist(s)	Don Sullivan	37	Minneapolis	2:48:43	2011	1st place, gold medalist(s)	Margaret Landberg	26	Minneapolis	3:05:46
2011	2nd place, silver medalist(s)	David Sanderson	34	Rochester	2:52:27	2011	2nd place, silver medalist(s)	Kathy Provenzano	36	Minneapolis	3:12:12
2011	3rd place, bronze medalist(s)	Andrew Hemenway	37	Rochester	2:54:45	2011	3rd place, bronze medalist(s)	Corrine Klebe	24	Rochester	3:26:08
2010	1st place, gold medalist(s)	Brian Aurelio	26	Washington, D.C.	2:53:25	2010	1st place, gold medalist(s)	Wanda Gau	47	Little Falls	3:17:22
2010	2nd place, silver medalist(s)	John Maas	48	Sleepy Eye	2:54:14	2010	2nd place, silver medalist(s)	Kalli Christen	40	St. Cloud	3:18:58
2010	3rd place, bronze medalist(s)	Michael Heinen	26	Willmar	2:55:36	2010	3rd place, bronze medalist(s)	Traci Amundson	35	Duluth	3:19:09
2009	1st place, gold medalist(s)	Joe Buckentine	46	St. Cloud	2:50:19	2009	1st place, gold medalist(s)	Kalli Christen	39	St. Cloud	3:17:52
2009	2nd place, silver medalist(s)	Ryan Hammerberg	25	St. Cloud	2:52:23	2009	2nd place, silver medalist(s)	Traci Amundson	34	Duluth	3:28:24
2009	3rd place, bronze medalist(s)	Paul Danger	38	Valparaiso, Indiana	2:55:13	2009	3rd place, bronze medalist(s)	Valerie Kelso	29	Rice	3:28:25
2008	1st place, gold medalist(s)	Paul Danger	37	Valparaiso, Indiana	2:47:36	2008	1st place, gold medalist(s)	Kalli Christen	38	St. Cloud	3:19:07
2008	2nd place, silver medalist(s)	David Hartz	50	Cold Spring	3:04:01	2008	2nd place, silver medalist(s)	Karen Wander	43	Becker	3:28:44
2008	3rd place, bronze medalist(s)	Stanley Hup	53	Northfield	3:17:32	2008	3rd place, bronze medalist(s)	Yvette Dockendorf	38	St. Louis Park	3:29:50
