= Albany, Minnesota =

City in Minnesota, United States

Albany
- City
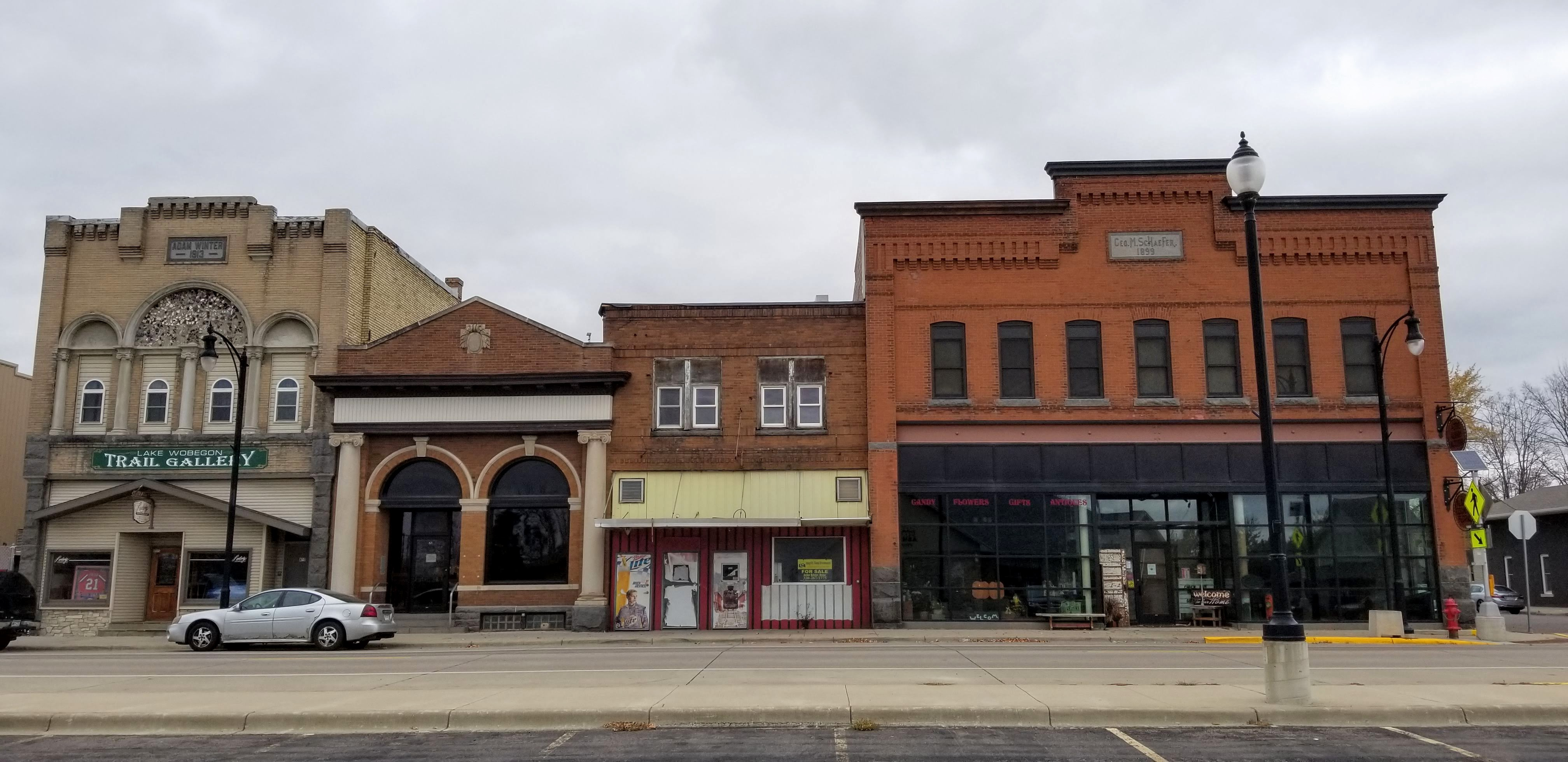
- Buildings on Railroad Avenue in Albany
- Nickname: "Where Friendly Paths Cross"
- Location of Albany within Stearns County, Minnesota

- Location within Minnesota Location within the United States Location within North America
- Coordinates: 45°37′42″N 94°34′03″W
- Country: United States
- State: Minnesota
- County: Stearns

Government
  - Mayor: Tom Kasner

Area
  - Total: 2.29 sq mi (5.92 km^{2})
  - Land: 2.17 sq mi (5.63 km^{2})
  - Water: 0.11 sq mi (0.29 km^{2})
- Elevation: 1,181 ft (360 m)

Population (2020)
  - Total: 2,780
  - Density: 1,278.9/sq mi (493.78/km^{2})
- Time zone: UTC-6 (Central (CST))
  - Summer (DST): UTC-5 (CDT)
- ZIP code: 56307
- Area code: 320
- FIPS code: 27-00622
- GNIS feature ID: 2393898
- Website: www.ci.albany.mn.us

Albany (/ˈɔːlbəni/ AWL-bə-nee) is a city in Stearns County, Minnesota, United States. The population was 2,780 at the 2020 census. It is part of the St. Cloud metropolitan area.

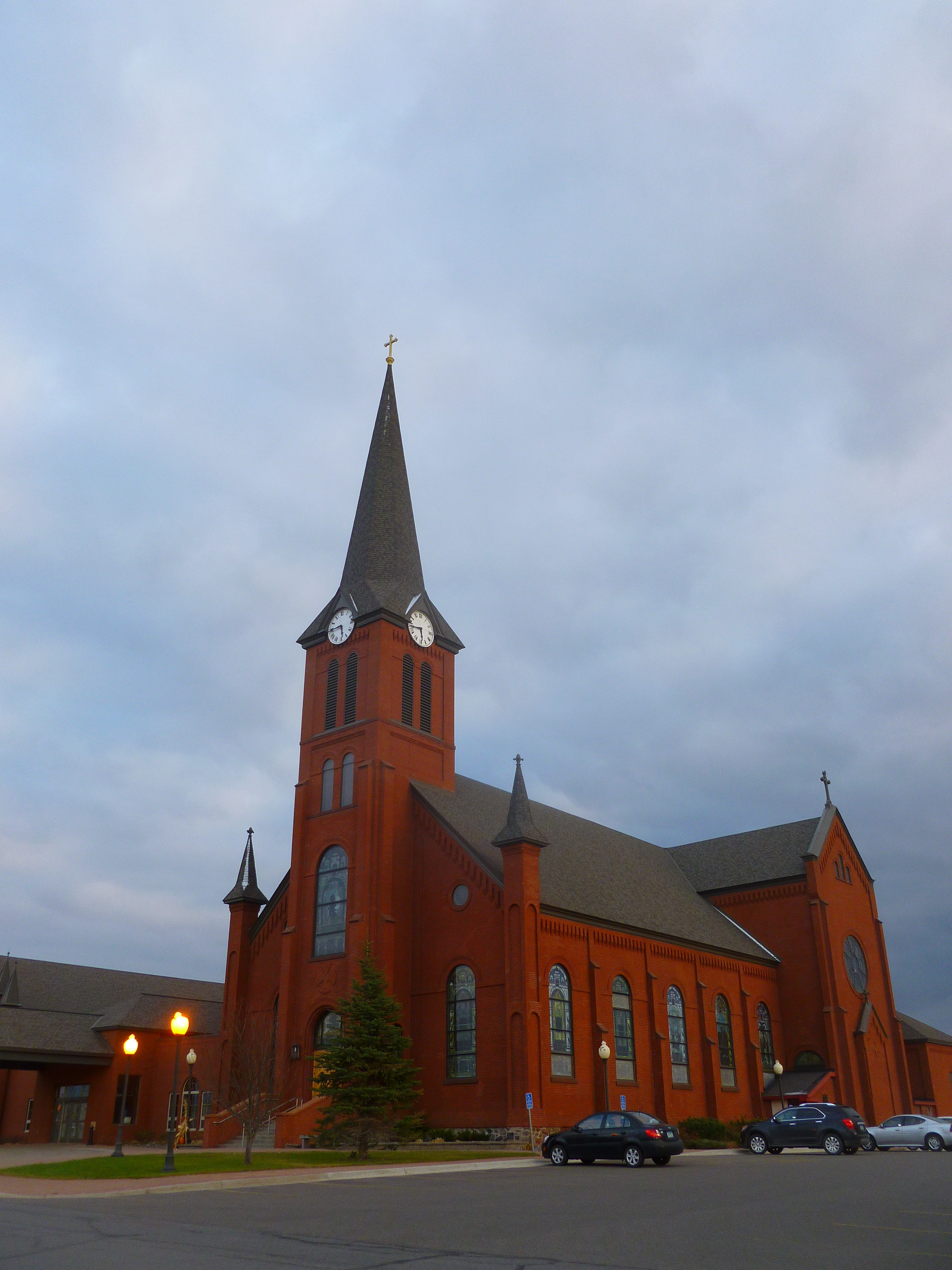
Seven Dolors Catholic Church

== History ==
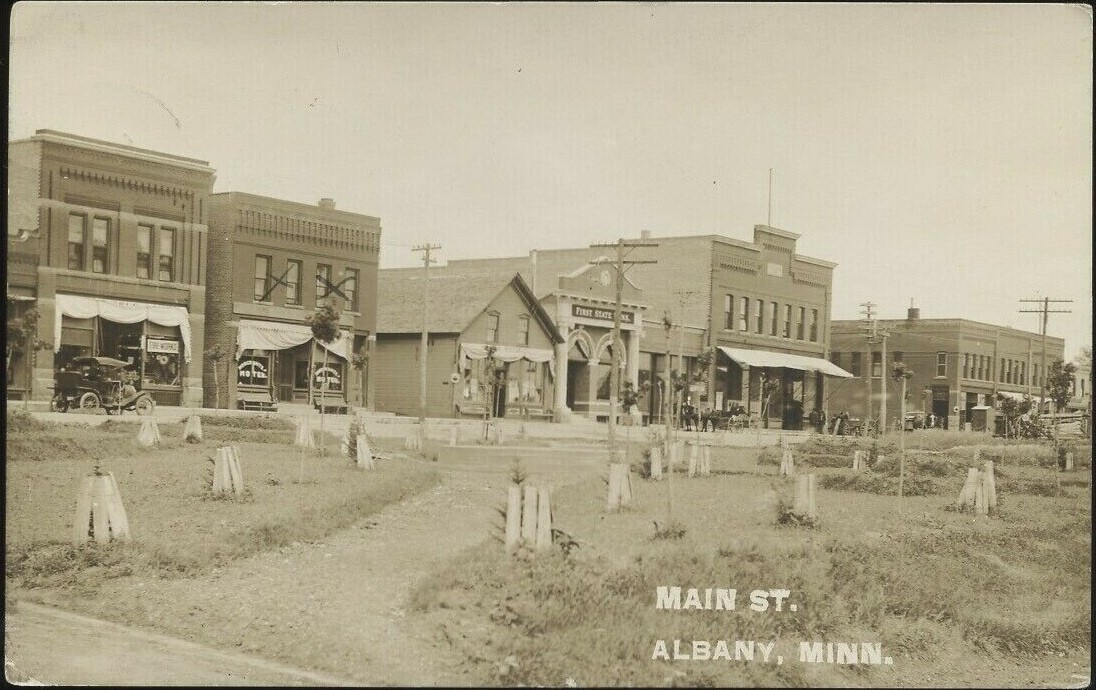
A real photo postcard captured a scene showing Albany, Minnesota on October 7–8, 1911

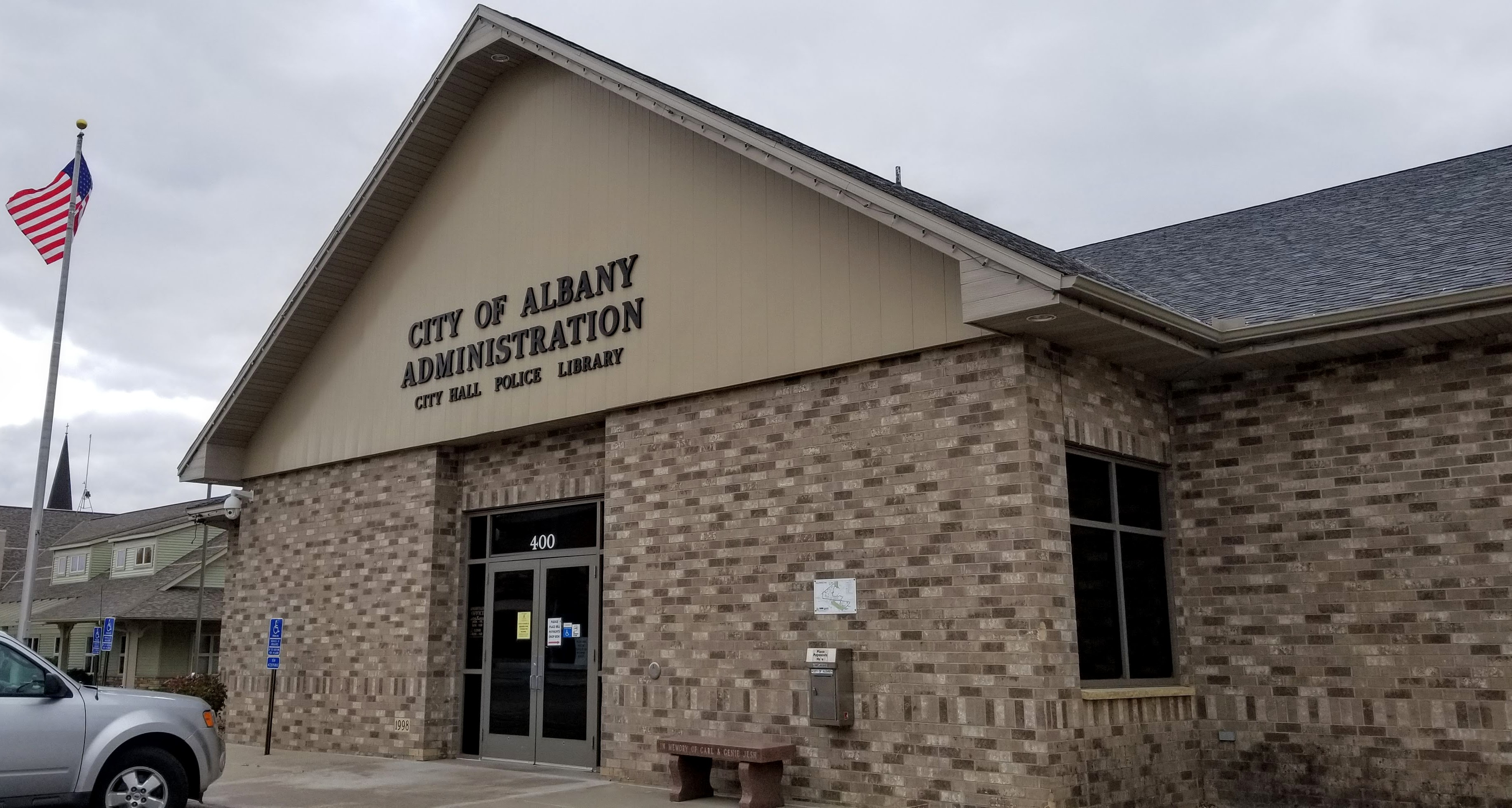
Albany administration building

Albany was incorporated in 1890.

== Geography ==
According to the United States Census Bureau, the city has a total area of 2.22 square miles (5.75 km^{2}); 2.11 square miles (5.46 km^{2}) is land and 0.11 square miles (0.28 km^{2}) is water.

Interstate 94/U.S. Highway 52 and Minnesota State Highway 238 are two of the main routes in the city.

Other nearby routes include Stearns County Roads 10, 41, 54, and 157.

== Education ==
The Albany Area Public School District, District #745, is a consolidated school district with a middle school serving grades 6–8, and a high school serving grades 9–12, located in Albany. The middle and high schools share one physical building. The Albany Elementary School serves grades K-5, and is on the same campus site as the middle school and high school. Another elementary school in the district, Avon Elementary School, serves children in Preschool-Grade 5, and is six miles east of Albany in nearby Avon. A 2015 building referendum resulted in security upgrades to all schools, expanded classroom space, a new theatre, and a new community center. Holy Family School, a K–6 Roman Catholic parochial school, is also in Albany.

== Politics ==
Albany is part of Minnesota House District 12B, which is represented by Paul Anderson (R); and Minnesota Senate District 12, which is represented by Torrey Westrom (R).

Albany is also part of Minnesota's 7th congressional district, currently represented in the U.S. Congress by Representative Michelle Fischbach (R).

== Demographics ==
Historical population
Census	Pop.	Note	%±
1900	517		—
1910	657		27.1%
1920	824		25.4%
1930	851		3.3%
1940	975		14.6%
1950	1,196		22.7%
1960	1,375		15.0%
1970	1,599		16.3%
1980	1,569		−1.9%
1990	1,548		−1.3%
2000	1,796		16.0%
2010	2,561		42.6%
2020	2,780		8.6%
U.S. Decennial Census

=== 2020 census ===
As of the 2020 census, Albany had a population of 2,780. The median age was 35.8 years. 27.7% of residents were under the age of 18 and 16.7% of residents were 65 years of age or older. For every 100 females there were 93.1 males, and for every 100 females age 18 and over there were 91.8 males age 18 and over.

0.0% of residents lived in urban areas, while 100.0% lived in rural areas.

There were 1,099 households in Albany, of which 34.2% had children under the age of 18 living in them. Of all households, 49.1% were married-couple households, 18.9% were households with a male householder and no spouse or partner present, and 24.6% were households with a female householder and no spouse or partner present. About 30.5% of all households were made up of individuals and 15.2% had someone living alone who was 65 years of age or older.

There were 1,157 housing units, of which 5.0% were vacant. The homeowner vacancy rate was 0.9% and the rental vacancy rate was 9.8%.

Racial composition as of the 2020 census
Race	Number	Percent
White	2,623	94.4%
Black or African American	10	0.4%
American Indian and Alaska Native	0	0.0%
Asian	16	0.6%
Native Hawaiian and Other Pacific Islander	0	0.0%
Some other race	50	1.8%
Two or more races	81	2.9%
Hispanic or Latino (of any race)	96	3.5%

=== Income and poverty ===
As of 2000 the median income for a household in the city was $31,577, and the median income for a family was $41,118. Males had a median income of $31,858 versus $18,966 for females. The per capita income for the city was $16,383. About 6.0% of families and 10.3% of the population were below the poverty line, including 12.0% of those under age 18 and 14.1% of those age 65 or over.

=== 2010 census ===
As of the census of 2010, there were 2,561 people, 1,030 households, and 657 families residing in the city. The population density was 1,213.7 inhabitants per square mile (468.6/km^{2}). There were 1,071 housing units at an average density of 507.6 per square mile (196.0/km^{2}). The racial makeup of the city was 97.6% White, 0.2% African American, 0.2% Native American, 0.2% Asian, 0.7% from other races, and 1.0% from two or more races. Hispanic or Latino of any race were 0.9% of the population.

There were 1,030 households, of which 36.3% had children under the age of 18 living with them, 48.4% were married couples living together, 10.6% had a female householder with no husband present, 4.8% had a male householder with no wife present, and 36.2% were non-families. 30.2% of all households were made up of individuals, and 16.4% had someone living alone who was 65 years of age or older. The average household size was 2.41 and the average family size was 3.01.

The median age in the city was 33.4 years. 27.3% of residents were under the age of 18; 7.5% were between the ages of 18 and 24; 29.3% were from 25 to 44; 17.7% were from 45 to 64; and 18.2% were 65 years of age or older. The gender makeup of the city was 46.9% male and 53.1% female.

== Sports and recreation ==
The Lake Wobegon Trail Marathon runs through Albany each year in May. The marathon was first run in 2008.

== Notable people ==
- James Steven Rausch – (1928–1981), Roman Catholic Bishop; born in Albany.
- Ed Schrom - (1911–1980), Minnesota state senator and farmer; born in Albany.
