= Avon, Minnesota =

City in Minnesota, United States

Avon
- City
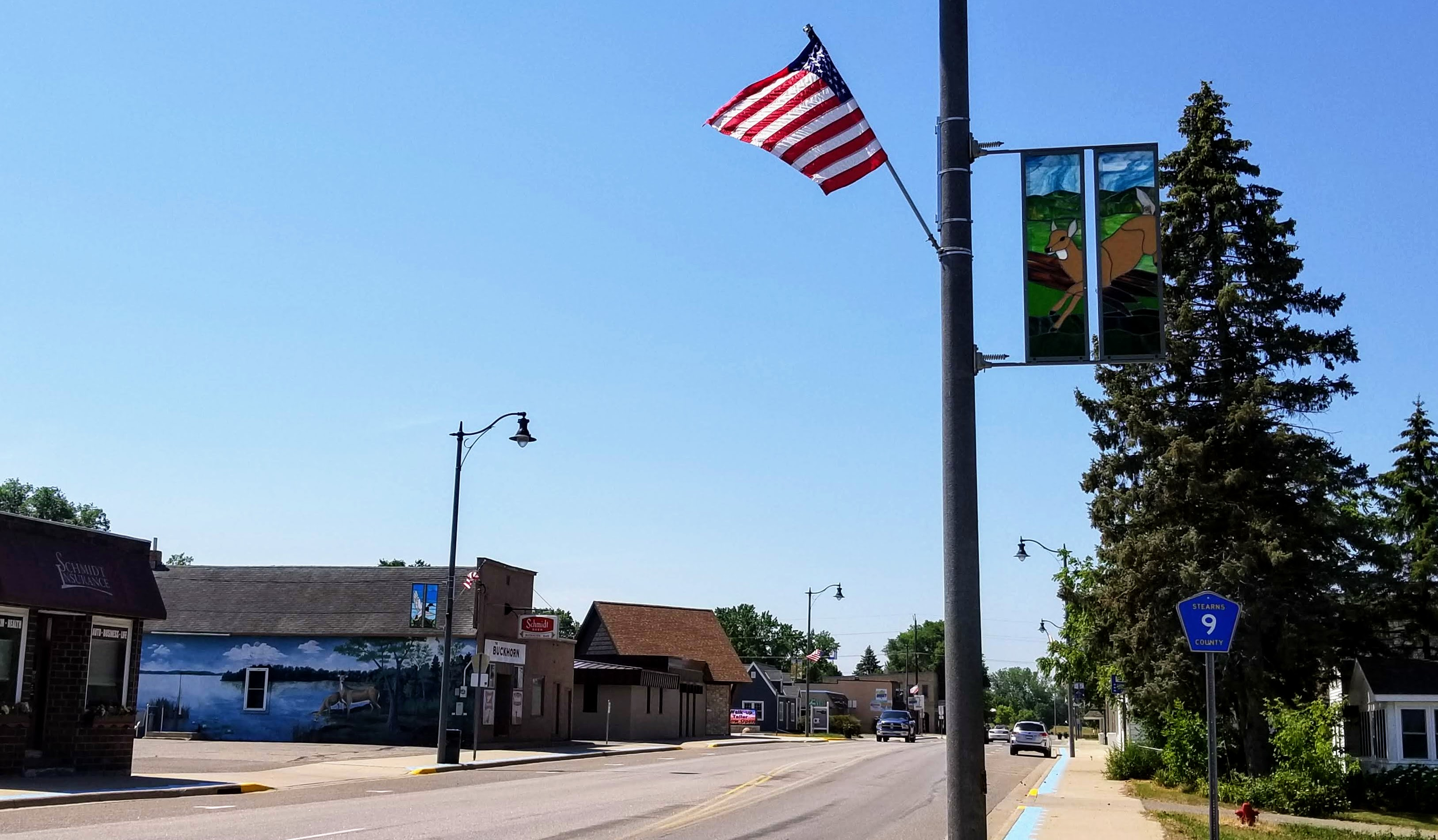
- Businesses on Avon's main street, Avon Avenue.
- Motto: "Lakes, Loons, Living"
- Location of Avon within Stearns County, Minnesota
- Coordinates: 45°36′31″N 94°27′02″W
- Country: United States
- State: Minnesota
- County: Stearns

Government
  - Type: Mayor-council
  - Mayor: Jeff Manthe

Area
  - Total: 1.70 sq mi (4.41 km^{2})
  - Land: 1.70 sq mi (4.41 km^{2})
  - Water: 0 sq mi (0.00 km^{2})
- Elevation: 1,132 ft (345 m)

Population (2020)
  - Total: 1,618
  - Density: 950.7/sq mi (367.08/km^{2})
- Time zone: UTC-6 (Central (CST))
  - Summer (DST): UTC-5 (CDT)
- ZIP code: 56310
- Area code: 320
- FIPS code: 27-03070
- GNIS feature ID: 2394043
- Website: https://cityofavonmn.gov/

Avon (/ˈeɪvɒn/ AY-von) is a city in Stearns County, Minnesota, United States. The population was 1,618 at the 2020 census. It is part of the St. Cloud Metropolitan Statistical Area.

== History ==
Avon was laid out in 1873 and founded after the foundation of St.Cloud . The community is named after the River Avon, in England. A post office has been in operation at Avon since 1873. Avon was incorporated in 1900.

== Geography ==
According to the United States Census Bureau, the city has a total area of 1.48 square miles (3.83 km^{2}), all land.

Interstate 94/U.S. Highway 52 and Stearns County Road 9 are two of the main routes in the city. Other routes include County Road 54.

== Demographics ==
Historical population
| Census | Pop. | Note | %± |
|---|---|---|---|
| 1900 | 162 | | — |
| 1910 | 277 | | 71.0% |
| 1920 | 709 | | 156.0% |
| 1930 | 362 | | −48.9% |
| 1940 | 403 | | 11.3% |
| 1950 | 386 | | −4.2% |
| 1960 | 443 | | 14.8% |
| 1970 | 725 | | 63.7% |
| 1980 | 804 | | 10.9% |
| 1990 | 970 | | 20.6% |
| 2000 | 1,242 | | 28.0% |
| 2010 | 1,396 | | 12.4% |
| 2020 | 1,618 | | 15.9% |
U.S. Decennial Census

=== 2020 census ===
As of the 2020 census, Avon had a population of 1,618. The median age was 38.3 years. 26.3% of residents were under the age of 18 and 18.0% of residents were 65 years of age or older. For every 100 females there were 97.3 males, and for every 100 females age 18 and over there were 94.1 males age 18 and over.

0.0% of residents lived in urban areas, while 100.0% lived in rural areas.

There were 630 households in Avon, of which 34.1% had children under the age of 18 living in them. Of all households, 59.4% were married-couple households, 12.5% were households with a male householder and no spouse or partner present, and 21.1% were households with a female householder and no spouse or partner present. About 22.4% of all households were made up of individuals and 9.2% had someone living alone who was 65 years of age or older.

There were 675 housing units, of which 6.7% were vacant. The homeowner vacancy rate was 0.6% and the rental vacancy rate was 12.1%.

Racial composition as of the 2020 census
| Race | Number | Percent |
|---|---|---|
| White | 1,561 | 96.5% |
| Black or African American | 3 | 0.2% |
| American Indian and Alaska Native | 1 | 0.1% |
| Asian | 2 | 0.1% |
| Native Hawaiian and Other Pacific Islander | 0 | 0.0% |
| Some other race | 8 | 0.5% |
| Two or more races | 43 | 2.7% |
| Hispanic or Latino (of any race) | 33 | 2.0% |

=== 2010 census ===
As of the census of 2010, there were 1,396 people, 557 households, and 393 families living in the city. The population density was 943.2 inhabitants per square mile (364.2/km^{2}). There were 592 housing units at an average density of 400.0 per square mile (154.4/km^{2}). The racial makeup of the city was 97.9% White, 0.3% African American, 0.4% Native American, 0.6% Asian, 0.5% from other races, and 0.4% from two or more races. Hispanic or Latino of any race were 0.9% of the population.

There were 557 households, of which 36.6% had children under the age of 18 living with them, 57.8% were married couples living together, 8.1% had a female householder with no husband present, 4.7% had a male householder with no wife present, and 29.4% were non-families. 25.1% of all households were made up of individuals, and 8.2% had someone living alone who was 65 years of age or older. The average household size was 2.51 and the average family size was 2.99.

The median age in the city was 34.2 years. 26.7% of residents were under the age of 18; 7.1% were between the ages of 18 and 24; 31% were from 25 to 44; 24.1% were from 45 to 64; and 11.1% were 65 years of age or older. The gender makeup of the city was 49.3% male and 50.7% female.

=== 2000 census ===
As of the census of 2000, there were 1,242 people, 470 households, and 355 families living in the city. The population density was 1,201.8 inhabitants per square mile (464.0/km^{2}). There were 492 housing units at an average density of 476.1 per square mile (183.8/km^{2}). The racial makeup of the city was 99.36% White, 0.08% Asian, 0.24% from other races, and 0.32% from two or more races. Hispanic or Latino of any race were 0.48% of the population.

There were 470 households, out of which 41.5% had children under the age of 18 living with them, 62.8% were married couples living together, 8.7% had a female householder with no husband present, and 24.3% were non-families. 20.2% of all households were made up of individuals, and 10.2% had someone living alone who was 65 years of age or older. The average household size was 2.64 and the average family size was 3.04.

In the city, the population was spread out, with 90% under the age of 18, 7.2% from 18 to 24, 31.3% from 25 to 44, 20.5% from 45 to 64, and 11.0% who were 65 years of age or older. The median age was 34 years. For every 100 females, there were 97.5 males. For every 100 females age 18 and over, there were 98.4 males.

The median income for a household in the city was $47,721, and the median income for a family was $53,214. Males had a median income of $37,386 versus $25,238 for females. The per capita income for the city was $19,980. About 1.3% of families and 3.1% of the population were below the poverty line, including 0.8% of those under age 18 and 10.0% of those age 65 or over.

== Arts and culture ==
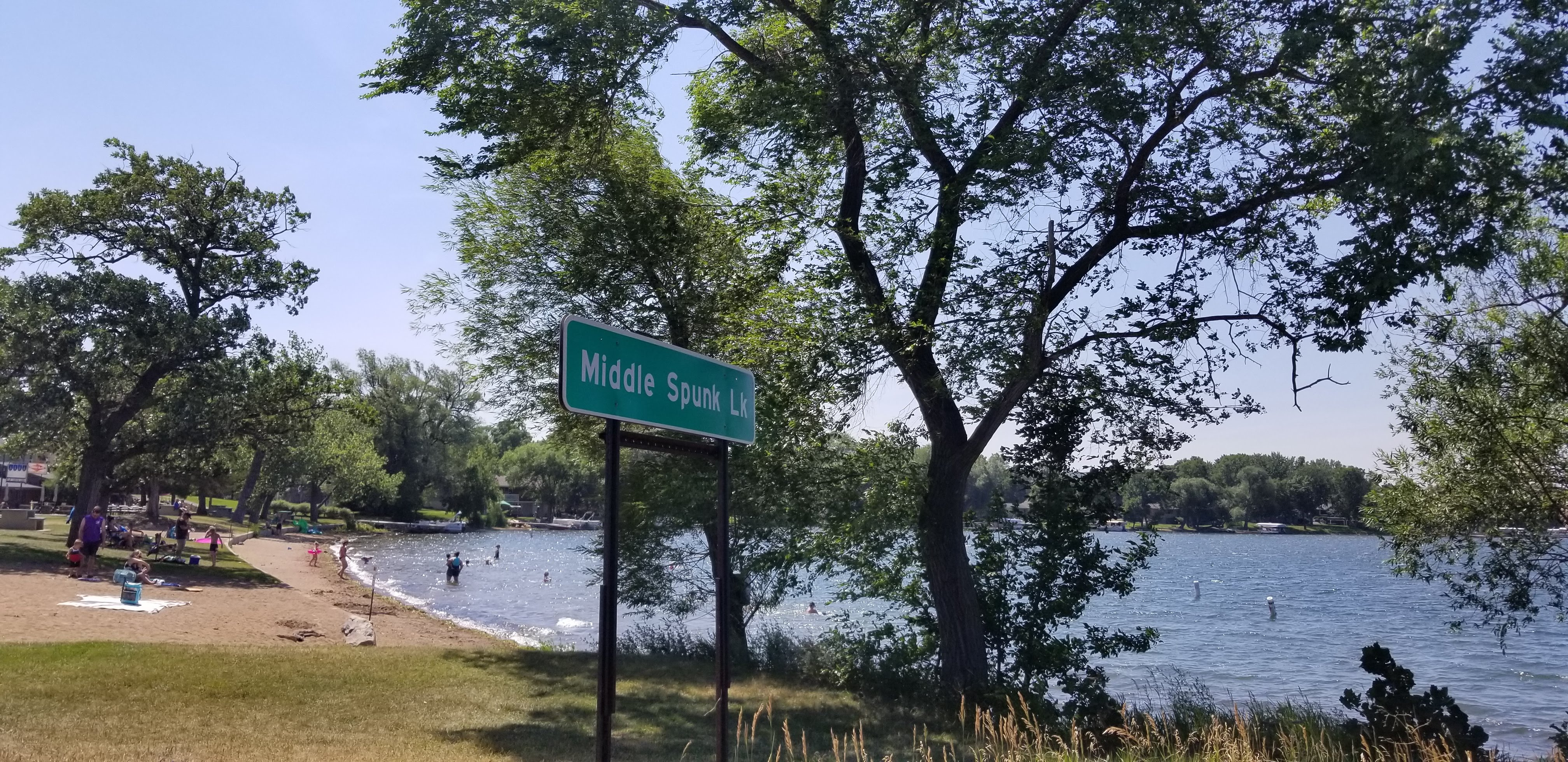
Public beach on Middle Spunk Lake.

=== Annual cultural events ===
Within Avon's city boundaries are three lakes which are named Upper Spunk, Middle Spunk, and Lower Spunk Lake. In honor of these lakes, Avon hosts an annual celebration called "Spunktacular Days", "Spunk Days" for short. The word "spunk" means material to start a fire, or torchwood, which settlers used to gather in the area. In total there are eight lakes within the city of Avon.

Each May since 2008, the Lake Wobegon Trail Marathon runs through Avon, and relies on many volunteers to staff cheering areas and water stations.

=== Sports teams ===
Avon is home to the Avon Lakers, who are part of the Amateur Baseball Victory League. The club was established in July 1979 by the Avon Lions Club when official construction of its baseball park began. The Avon Lions Club purchased land directly south of the old park which at that time consisted of a pasture and a small pond.

The Avon Lakers and the City of Avon sponsor the Region 8C Baseball Tournament.

Founded in Avon, the Albany Minnesota Soccer Club officially became a team in the summer of 2024. In their debut season, they achieved a strong 6-3-3 record, with plans to launch a varsity program in the near future.

== References in popular culture ==
In the 35th anniversary broadcast of the radio variety show, A Prairie Home Companion, which was performed live in Avon on July 4, 2009, radio personality Garrison Keillor referred to Avon as being "about as close to Lake Wobegon as you can get."

== Notable person ==
- Alphonsus Augustus Sowada (1933–2014), Roman Catholic Bishop; born in Avon.
