= Ukraine women's national bandy team =

Ukraine women's national bandy team Національна жіноча збірна України з хокею з м'ячем (Ukrainian)
- The Coat of arms of Ukraine is the badge used on player jerseys.
- Association: Ukrainian Bandy Association
- Head coach: Magnus Alm

First international
- Ukraine 0 – 1 Switzerland (Eriksson Arena, Åby, Sweden; 29 March 2023)

Biggest defeat
- Ukraine 0 – 4 Netherlands (Eriksson Arena, Åby, Sweden; 31 March 2023); Ukraine 1 – 5 Netherlands (Eriksson Arena, Åby, Sweden; 30 March 2023)

World Championship
- Appearances: 1 (first in 2023)
- Best result: 6th (2023)

The Ukraine women's national bandy team (Ukrainian: Національна жіноча збірна України з хокею з м'ячем) represents Ukraine in the Women's Bandy World Championship and other international bandy competitions. It is governed by the Ukrainian Bandy Association, a member of the Federation of International Bandy (FIB).

== History ==
Women's bandy teams were first recorded to have appeared in Kharkiv, Ukraine, in 1927.

After regaining the independence, Ukraine women's national bandy team did not compete in major international tournaments till 2022. In 2022, Ukraine team was scheduled to play at the 2022 Women's Bandy World Championship in Åby, Sweden. Ukraine was expected to play against Great Britain (who were also making their debut), Netherlands, Estonia, and Switzerland. Due to the 2022 Russian invasion of Ukraine, the team had to withdraw from the tournament. The Kharkiv rink "Saltivskyi lid", which hosted the Ukrainian Rink Bandy Cup 2021, was hit in a Russian rocket attack. From September 2022, the training of bandy teams started at the "Ice Arena" in Dnipro for men, young boys and girls.

The team debuted at the 2023 Women's Bandy World Championship in Åby, Sweden. The team consisted of ice hockey players and its captain at the tournament was Kateryna Seredenko. 10 out of the 15 players were from Ukraine's northeastern city of Kharkiv. Since the Ukraine's Bandy Association, which was at the time based in Dnipro, was not eligible for financial aid from the state budget, the team management was forced to find external sources to finance their journey to the championships. Ukraine lost all games in the group stage against the Netherlands and Switzerland, then lost the fifth place game against Switzerland, and eventually finished 6th (last). The only goal for the team was scored by Olena Tkachuk in the game against the Netherlands on 30 March 2023.

== World Championships participation ==
Year	Rank	GP	W	D	L	GS	GA	GD
(Finland) 2004 to (Norway) 2020	Did not enter							
(Sweden) 2022	Withdrew							
(Sweden) 2023	6th	5	0	0	5	1	12	-11
Total	1/10	5	0	0	5	1	12	-11

== Head-to-head record ==
As of 2 April 2023.

Against	Played	Won	Drawn	Lost	GF	GA	GD
Netherlands	2	0	0	2	1	9	-8
Switzerland	3	0	0	3	0	3	-3
Total: 2 nations	5	0	0	5	1	12	-11

== See also ==
- Bandy
- Rink bandy
- Women's Bandy World Championship
