= 2022 Women's Bandy World Championship =

2022 edition of the Bandy World Championship

11th Bandy World Championship

Tournament details
- Host country: Sweden
- City: Åby
- Venue: Eriksson Arena
- Dates: 23–27 March 2022
- Teams: 8

Final positions
- Champions: Sweden (10th title)
- Runners-up: Norway
- Third place: Finland
- Fourth place: United States

Tournament statistics
- Games played: 25
- Scoring leader: (Sweden) Tilda Ström (15 points)

Awards
- MVP: (Sweden) Ida Friman

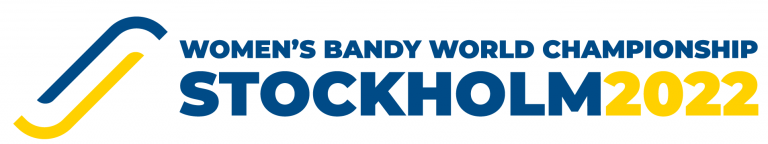
The 2022 tournament was originally to be held in Stockholm, and this was the logo created for it.

The 2022 Women's Bandy World Championship was an international bandy tournament for women and the 11th (XI) Women's Bandy World Championship organized by the Federation of International Bandy (FIB). The event was contested by eight teams from 23 to 27 March 2022 in Åby, Sweden.

Due to the Russian invasion of Ukraine, Team Russia withdrew from the tournament and although the Ukraine women's national bandy team was scheduled to participate, they had to withdraw. Team Ukraine's appearance was meant to be the Ukrainian women's bandy world debut, almost a century after women's bandy teams were first recorded to have appeared in Kharkiv, Ukraine, in 1927.

The Great Britain women's national bandy team made its first international appearance at the 2022 world championship after its initial attempt to compete at the 2014 Women's Bandy World Championship had failed to materialize.

The 2023 Women's Bandy World Championship was to be hosted in late March and early April again in Åby in Växjö, Sweden, alongside the men's 2023 Bandy World Championship.

== History ==
According to the Federation of International Bandy (FIB), the competition was postponed from its initial start date due to organizing problems in Sweden. It was initially planned to be held in Stockholm, Sweden, January 9-16, 2022 at the newly built Gubbängen's Skating and Bandy Arena (Bandyhallen i Gubbängen in Swedish). The tournament was to be the first Women's Bandy World Championship to be played indoors and still was after the change of venue.

The new date for the 2022 Women's Bandy World Championship was set for March 23-27, 2022. The Russian team withdrew and the Ukraine team had to withdraw due to the 2022 Russian invasion of Ukraine.

== Venues ==
The 2022 Women's Bandy World Championships took place in Åby, a small community north of Växjö, in southern Sweden about 400 kilometers south of Stockholm.

The tournament was held at the Eriksson Arena a newly built bandy arena⁣ which was completed in 2019. Åby/Tjureda IF, a team in the Bandyallsvenskan, the Swedish second division, normally plays there.

== Squads ==
Each team had a maximum of 16 players and 4 leaders.

== Referees ==
There were three main referees: Victoria Bergström (Sweden), Stephanie Johnson (USA) and Ida Salomonsson (Sweden).

There were also six assistant referees: Elisabeth Englund, Siri Hansson, Hanna Hansson, Samuel Pettersson, Andreas Pettersson and Hannah Pettersson.

== Pool A ==
All games 2 x 45 minutes.

=== Group stage ===
Pos	Team	Pld	W	D	L	GF	GA	GD	Pts	Qualification
1	Sweden (H)	3	3	0	0	21	3	+18	6	Pool A Semifinals
2	Norway	3	2	0	1	11	10	+1	4	Pool A Semifinals
3	Finland	3	1	0	2	8	20	−12	2	Pool A Semifinals
4	United States	3	0	0	3	6	13	−7	0	Pool A Semifinals

Source: FIB
(H) Hosts
23 March 2022
15:00

Norway	4–3	United States
Berntsen-Lillejord 12'; Døhlen Holm 45+1', 52' (p); Egeberg 66'	Report	Stech 21' (p), 71'; Wanecke 75'

Eriksson Arena, Åby
Attendance: 72
Referee: (Sweden) Ida Salomonsson
23 March 2022
18:00

Sweden	11–2	Finland
Svenler 2'; Ström 25', 73', 75', 87'; M. Friman 27'; I. Friman 28', 87'; Ahlander 68', 69' (p); Josefsson 76'	Report	Nykänen 5', 45+1' (p)

Eriksson Arena, Åby
Attendance: 553
Referee: (Sweden) Victoria Bergström

24 March 2022
15:00

Finland	6–3	United States
Lohiniva 12', 43', 47'; Simola 61', 89'; Nykänen 90+2'	Report	Johnson 18'; Schildhaus 28'; 81' (o.g.)

Eriksson Arena, Åby
Attendance: 54
Referee: (Sweden) Victoria Bergström
24 March 2022
18:00

Norway	1–7	Sweden
Bjonge 33'	Report	Östman 21'; Ahlander 26', 36'; Svenler 40', 56'; I. Friman 51'; Ström 75'

Eriksson Arena, Åby
Attendance: 156
Referee: (United States) Stephanie Johnson

25 March 2022
15:00

Finland	0–6	Norway
	Report	Bakke 6'; Selbekk 8', 68' (p); Egeberg 37', 52'; Andresen Follesø 42'

Eriksson Arena, Åby
Attendance: 63
Referee: (United States) Stephanie Johnson
25 March 2022
18:00

Sweden	3–0	United States
Ström 17'; I. Friman 28'; M. Friman 65'	Report

Eriksson Arena, Åby
Attendance: 236
Referee: (Sweden) Ida Salomonsson

=== Knockout stage ===
==== Bracket ====
Semifinals
26 March
Sweden	7
United States	0
26 March
Norway (OT)	3
Finland	2

Final
27 March
Sweden	12
Norway	0
Third place
27 March
United States	2
Finland	5

==== Semifinals ====
26 March 2022
14:00

Sweden	7–0	United States
Ahlander 2' (p); I. Friman 7'; Ström 12', 18', 67', 90+2'; Eklund 90+4'	Report

Eriksson Arena, Åby
Attendance: 478
Referee: (Sweden) Victoria Bergström
26 March 2022
17:00

Norway	3–2 (OT)	Finland
Andresen Follesø 2'; Selbekk 22', 102'	Report	Nykänen 13' (p); Snäll 38'

Eriksson Arena, Åby
Attendance: 130
Referee: (Sweden) Ida Salomonsson

==== Bronze game ====
27 March 2022
10:00 (11:00 UTC+2)

Finland	5–2	United States
Lohiniva 11', 82'; Simola 24', 64', 90+2'	Report	Stech 16', 76'

Eriksson Arena, Åby
Attendance: 145
Referee: (Sweden) Victoria Bergström

==== Final ====
27 March 2022
13:30 (14:30 UTC+2)

Sweden	12–0	Norway
Svenler 17'; Ström 22', 26', 38', 43', 59'; M. Friman 27'; Eklund 71'; Åkerlund 77', 90+2'; I. Friman 85'; Ahlander 90'	Report

Eriksson Arena, Åby
Attendance: 1023
Referee: (Sweden) Ida Salomonsson

== Pool B ==
All games 2 x 30 minutes.

=== Group stage ===
Pos	Team	Pld	W	D	L	GF	GA	GD	Pts	Qualification
1	Great Britain	3	3	0	0	15	3	+12	6	Pool B Semifinals
2	Netherlands	3	2	0	1	6	4	+2	4	Pool B Semifinals
3	Estonia	3	1	0	2	7	11	−4	2	Pool B Semifinals
4	Switzerland	3	0	0	3	2	12	−10	0	Pool B Semifinals

Source: FIB
23 March 2022
11:00

Great Britain	8–0	Switzerland
Hartley 3', 34' (p), 38', 47', 52'; Hobbins 11', 19'; Bache 46'	Report

Eriksson Arena, Åby
Attendance: 32
Referee: (Sweden) Ida Salomonsson
23 March 2022
13:00

Netherlands	4–2	Estonia
Wortel 14'; Gezelius 30', 34', 60'	Report	Andreasson 22', 25'

Eriksson Arena, Åby
Attendance: 89
Referee: (United States) Stephanie Johnson

24 March 2022
11:00

Estonia	2–5	Great Britain
Andreasson 22', 46' (p)	Report	Hartley 8', 18', 44', 52'; Hobbins 42'

Eriksson Arena, Åby
Attendance: 37
Referee: (Sweden) Victoria Bergström
24 March 2022
13:00

Switzerland	0–1	Netherlands
	Report	Noë 39'

Eriksson Arena, Åby
Attendance: 61
Referee: (Sweden) Ida Salomonsson

25 March 2022
11:00

Switzerland	2–3	Estonia
Langlois 21', 42'	Report	Andreasson 6', 37', 46'

Eriksson Arena, Åby
Attendance: 54
Referee: (United States) Stephanie Johnson
25 March 2022
13:00

Netherlands	1–2	Great Britain
Barton 9'	Report	Hobbins 15'; Hartley 60+2' (p)

Eriksson Arena, Åby
Attendance: 68
Referee: (Sweden) Victoria Bergström

=== Knockout stage ===
==== Bracket ====
Semifinals
26 March
Netherlands	5
Estonia	2
26 March
Great Britain	9
Switzerland	0

Final
27 March
Netherlands (OT)	1
Great Britain	0
Third place
27 March
Estonia	4
Switzerland	2

==== Semifinals ====
26 March 2022
09:00

Netherlands	5–2	Estonia
Gezelius 5'; Hesen 20'; Barton 38'; van Wijchen 44'; van der Wielen 49'	Report	Andreasson 8', 29'

Eriksson Arena, Åby
Attendance: 58
Referee: (Sweden) Ida Salomonsson
26 March 2022
11:00

Great Britain	9–0	Switzerland
Rafter 7'; Hobbins 8', 57'; Hartley 10', 15', 33' (p); Bache 25', 43'; Revell 35'	Report

Eriksson Arena, Åby
Attendance: 68
Referee: (United States) Stephanie Johnson

==== Bronze game ====
26 March 2022
20:00

Estonia	5–2	Switzerland
Andreasson 3' (p), 28', 38'; Kalde 8', 40'	Report	Gilomen 37'; Ramseier 57'

Eriksson Arena, Åby
Attendance: 27
Referee: (United States) Stephanie Johnson

==== Final ====
27 March 2022
08:00 (09:00 UTC+2)

Netherlands	1–0 (OT)	Great Britain
Gommans 66'	Report

Eriksson Arena, Åby
Attendance: 45
Referee: (United States) Stephanie Johnson

== Final ranking ==
Rank	Team
1st place, gold medalist(s)	Sweden
2nd place, silver medalist(s)	Norway
3rd place, bronze medalist(s)	Finland
4	United States
5	Netherlands
6	Great Britain
7	Estonia
8	Switzerland

== Tournament awards ==
The following players was named the best in their position in the 2022 tournament:

- MVP: (Sweden) Ida Friman
- Best goalkeeper: (Finland) Tytti Segerman
- Best defender: (United States) Rebecca Draper
- Best midfielder: (Finland) Joanna Nykänen
- Best forward: (Sweden) Tilda Ström
