= 2018 Women's Bandy World Championship =

9th Bandy World Championship

Tournament details
- Host country: China
- City: Chengde
- Venue: Chengde Mountain Resort
- Dates: 9–13 January 2018
- Teams: 8

Final positions
- Champions: Sweden (8th title)
- Runners-up: Russia
- Third place: Norway
- Fourth place: Finland

Tournament statistics
- Games played: 19
- Goals scored: 144 (7.58 per game)
- Attendance: 5,060 (266 per game)
- Scoring leader(s): (Finland) Susanna Simola (11 goals)

Awards
- MVP: (Sweden) Matilda Svenler

The 2018 Women's Bandy World Championship was held in China, in the city of Chengde on 9–13 January 2018. This was the IXth Women's Bandy World Championship.

While the highest number of participants in any previous tournament was 7, the organisers had thought out measures aimed at attracting 12 participating countries. However, in the end the number of teams were 8, including the debutants Estonia and Switzerland, while Canada declined this year. The matches were played on naturally frozen ice on the lake at Chengde Mountain Resort.

Sweden and Russia met for the ninth time of nine possible in the final. For the eighth time Sweden won.

== Venue ==
Chengde Mountain Resort (UNESCO World Heritage Site)
Host venue
Location	China – Chengde
Constructed	Naturally frozen ice on the lake
Capacity	

== Group stage ==
All times are local (UTC+8).

=== Group A ===
Pos	Team	Pld	W	D	L	GF	GA	GD	Pts	Qualification
1	Russia	3	3	0	0	13	1	+12	6	Semifinals
2	Sweden	3	2	0	1	15	3	+12	4	Semifinals
3	Norway	3	1	0	2	4	14	−10	2	Semifinals
4	United States	3	0	0	3	0	14	−14	0	Qualifying match

Source: Russian Bandy Federation
9 January 2018
12:00

Norway	0–5	Russia
	Report	Gurinchik 23', 50'; K. Lipanova 33' (p); Mashinskaya 51'; Rodionova 55'

Chengde Mountain Resort, Chengde
Attendance: 50
Referee: Ida Salomonsson
9 January 2018
13:30

Sweden	5–0	United States
Larsson 5'; Svenler 12'; Johansson 16', 37'; Erlandsson 52'	Report

Chengde Mountain Resort, Chengde
Attendance: 50
Referee: Sofia Amosova
10 January 2018
10:00

United States	0–4	Norway
	Report	Kvaal-Knutsen 3'; Bjonge 27'; Krogsveen 33'; Selbekk 36'

Chengde Mountain Resort, Chengde
Attendance: 80
Referee: Ida Salomonsson
10 January 2018
15:00

Russia	3–1	Sweden
Gurinchik 1', 2', 21'	Report	Svenler 57'

Chengde Mountain Resort, Chengde
Attendance: 500
Referee: Lisa Elg
11 January 2018
11:45

Sweden	9–0	Norway
Larsson 7'; Johansson 11'; Persson 14', 56', 57'; Timan 23'; Plan 39'; Svenler 41'; Widing 60' (p)	Report

Chengde Mountain Resort, Chengde
Attendance: 200
Referee: Sofia Amosova
11 January 2018
13:30

Russia	5–0	United States
Rodionova 5', 9', 17'; K. Lipanova 23' (p); Mikhailova 37'	Report

Chengde Mountain Resort, Chengde
Attendance: 100
Referee: Lisa Elg

=== Group B ===
Pos	Team	Pld	W	D	L	GF	GA	GD	Pts	Qualification
1	Finland	3	3	0	0	46	0	+46	6	Qualifying match
2	China (H)	3	2	0	1	17	11	+6	4	5th place match
3	Estonia	3	1	0	2	12	14	−2	2	7th place match
4	Switzerland	3	0	0	3	1	51	−50	0	7th place match

Source: Russian Bandy Federation
(H) Hosts
9 January 2018
10:30

Finland	10–0	China
	Report

Chengde Mountain Resort, Chengde
Attendance: 350
9 January 2018
15:00

Estonia	12–0	Switzerland
	Report

Chengde Mountain Resort, Chengde
Attendance: 50
10 January 2018
12:00

Finland	27–0	Switzerland
	Report

Chengde Mountain Resort, Chengde
Attendance: 30
10 January 2018
13:30

China	5–0	Estonia
	Report

Chengde Mountain Resort, Chengde
Attendance: 70
11 January 2018
10:00

Switzerland	1–12	China
	Report

Chengde Mountain Resort, Chengde
Attendance: 180
11 January 2018
15:15

Estonia	0–9	Finland
	Report

Chengde Mountain Resort, Chengde
Attendance: 100

== Knock-out stage ==
=== Bracket ===
Qualifying match
12 January
United States	2 (2)
Finland (PSO)	2 (3)

Semi-finals
12 January
Russia	4
Finland	0
12 January
Sweden	5
Norway	0

Final
13 January
Russia	0
Sweden	1
Third place
13 January
Norway	5
Finland	2

=== Qualifying match ===
12 January 2018
09:00

United States	2–2	Finland
Stech 7'; Meuwissen 17'	Report	Lohiniva 8'; Oravuo 23'
Penalties
	2–3

Chengde Mountain Resort, Chengde
Attendance: 150
Referee: (Sweden) Ida Salomonsson

=== 7th place match ===
12 January 2018
12:30

Estonia	7–2	Switzerland
Jõemets 3'; Raku 5'; Tsupsman 7'; Ivanova 19' (p), 20', 27'; Aasma 22'	Report	Tüller 18', 23'

Chengde Mountain Resort, Chengde
Attendance: 100
Referee: (Sweden) Lisa Elg

=== 5th place match ===
12 January 2018
15:30

United States	6–0	China
McGinty 4'; Fleming 13'; Meuwissen 28'; Reynolds 37'; Funk 54'; Stech 59'	Report

Chengde Mountain Resort, Chengde
Attendance: 300
Referee: (Russia) Sofia Amosova

=== Semifinals ===
12 January 2018
11:00

Sweden	5–0	Norway
Johansson 2' (p); Friman 30'; Bergvall 41'; Plan 55'; Svenler 58'	Report

Chengde Mountain Resort, Chengde
Attendance: 250
Referee: (Russia) Sofia Amosova
12 January 2018
14:00

Russia	4–0	Finland
Gurinchik 7'; D. Lipanova 11'; Rodionova 15'; Mikhailova 46'	Report

Chengde Mountain Resort, Chengde
Attendance: 300
Referee: (Sweden) Ida Salomonsson

=== Third place match ===
13 January 2018
10:00

Norway	5–2	Finland
Holm 23' (p); Kvaal-Knutsen 49', 52'; Krogsveen 69'; Selbekk 86'	Report	Nykänen 9'; Lohiniva 39'

Chengde Mountain Resort, Chengde
Attendance: 200
Referee: (Sweden) Ida Salomonsson

=== Final ===
13 January 2018
14:00

Russia	0–1	Sweden
	Report	Johansson 43'

Chengde Mountain Resort, Chengde
Attendance: 2,000
Referee: (Sweden) Lisa Elg

== Final ranking ==
Gold medal	Sweden
Silver medal	Russia
Bronze medal	Norway
4	Finland
5	United States
6	China
7	Estonia
8	Switzerland

== Tournament awards ==
The following players was named the best in their position in the 2018 tournament:

- MVP: (Sweden) Matilda Svenler
- Best goalkeeper: (Sweden) Linda Odén
- Best defender: (Sweden) Anna Widing
- Best midfielder: (Russia) Olga Bogdanova
- Best forward: (Russia) Olga Rodionova
