= 2025 Women's World Championship =

2025 Women's World Championship may refer to:

- 2025 World Women's Handball Championship
- 2025 FIVB Women's Volleyball World Championship
- 2025 Women's World Squash Championship
- 2025 Women's Bandy World Championship
