= 2025 Women's Bandy World Championship =

International bandy tournament in Sweden

XIII Bandy World Championship

Tournament details
- Host country: Sweden
- City: Lidköping
- Venue: Sparbanken Lidköping Arena (in 1 host city)
- Dates: 24–30 March
- Teams: 8

Final positions
- Champions: Sweden (12th title)
- Runners-up: Norway
- Third place: United States
- Fourth place: Finland

Tournament statistics
- Games played: 16
- Goals scored: 128 (8 per game)
- Scoring leader(s): (Netherlands) Esther de Jong (9 goals)

Awards
- MVP: (Sweden) Agnes Ögren

The 2025 Bandy World Championship for women and the 2025 men's Bandy World Championship were played in Lidköping, Sweden, on 24th – 30th March 2025. For the second time, the men's world championship and the women's world championship were played at the same arena and interwined with each other.

== Venues ==
All matches were played at Sparbanken Lidköping Arena, an indoor bandy arena in Lidköping.

Sweden
Lidköping
Venue
Sparbanken Lidköping Arena
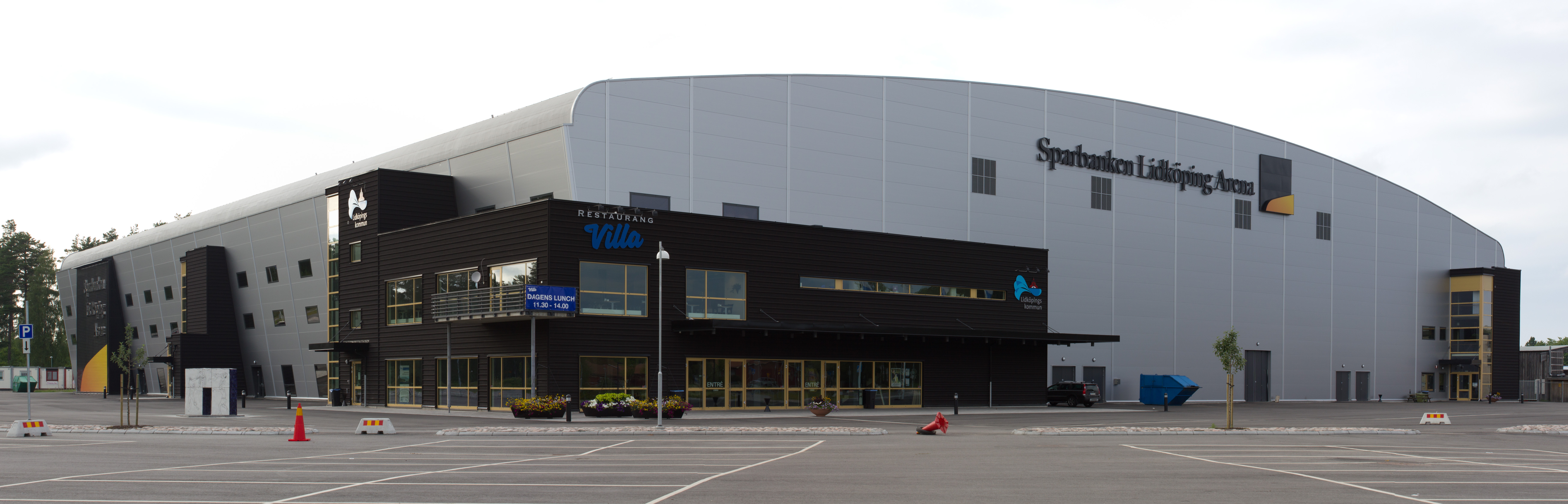

== Group stage ==
=== Pool A ===
Pos	Team	Pld	W	D	L	GF	GA	GD	Pts	Qualification
1	Sweden (H)	3	3	0	0	35	4	+31	6	Final
2	United States	3	2	0	1	11	13	−2	4	Semifinal
3	Norway	3	1	0	2	11	18	−7	2	Semifinal
4	Finland	3	0	0	3	2	24	−22	0	Playoff

Source: FIB
(H) Hosts
25 March 2025
10:30

United States	4–1	Finland
	Report

Sparbanken Lidköping Arena, Lidköping
25 March 2025
18:00

Sweden	13–1	Norway
	Report

Sparbanken Lidköping Arena, Lidköping

26 March 2025
12:00

Sweden	9–2	United States
	Report

Sparbanken Lidköping Arena, Lidköping
26 March 2025
14:30

Norway	7–0	Finland
	Report

Sparbanken Lidköping Arena, Lidköping

27 March 2025
12:00

Norway	3–5	United States
	Report

Sparbanken Lidköping Arena, Lidköping
27 March 2025
17:00

Sweden	13–1	Finland
	Report

Sparbanken Lidköping Arena, Lidköping

=== Pool B ===
Pos	Team	Pld	W	D	L	GF	GA	GD	Pts	Qualification
1	Netherlands	3	3	0	0	26	1	+25	6	Playoff
2	Ukraine	3	2	0	1	4	10	−6	4	
3	Germany	3	0	1	2	3	12	−9	1	
4	Switzerland	3	0	1	2	4	14	−10	1	

Source: FIB
26 March 2025
07:00

Germany	2–2	Switzerland
	Report
Penalties
	3–2

Sparbanken Lidköping Arena, Lidköping
26 March 2025
09:30

Ukraine	0–8	Netherlands
	Report

Sparbanken Lidköping Arena, Lidköping

27 March 2025
07:00

Switzerland	1–2	Ukraine
	Report

Sparbanken Lidköping Arena, Lidköping
27 March 2025
09:30

Netherlands	8–0	Germany
	Report

Sparbanken Lidköping Arena, Lidköping

28 March 2025
09:30

Germany	1–2	Ukraine
	Report

Sparbanken Lidköping Arena, Lidköping
28 March 2025
12:00

Switzerland	1–10	Netherlands
	Report

Sparbanken Lidköping Arena, Lidköping

=== Knockout stage ===
==== Bracket ====
Semifinal
28 March
United States	1
Norway	5

Final
30 March
Sweden	8
Norway	1

Playoff
29 March
Finland	8
Netherlands	0

Third place
30 March
United States	7
Finland	2

==== Semifinal ====
28 March 2025
14:30

United States	1–5	Norway
	Report

Sparbanken Lidköping Arena, Lidköping

==== Playoff ====
29 March 2025
13:00

Finland	8–0	Netherlands
	Report

Sparbanken Lidköping Arena, Lidköping

==== Third place game ====
30 March 2025
07:00

United States	7–2	Finland
	Report

Sparbanken Lidköping Arena, Lidköping

==== Final ====
30 March 2025
12:30

Sweden	8–1	Norway
	Report

Sparbanken Lidköping Arena, Lidköping

== Final ranking ==
Rank	Team
1st place, gold medalist(s)	Sweden
2nd place, silver medalist(s)	Norway
3rd place, bronze medalist(s)	United States
4	Finland
5	Netherlands
6	Ukraine
7	Germany
8	Switzerland

== Top Scorer ==
Scoring Leaders (Source: profixio):

- 9 Goals: (Netherlands) Esther Chinouk de Jong
- 7 Goals: (Sweden) Edit Ljung
- 6 Goals: (Netherlands) Leanne Marian Roberta van der Wielen
- 5 Goals: (Sweden) Tilda Ström
- 4 Goals: (Sweden) Sanna Gustafsson
- 4 Goals: (Poland) Kerstin Ingrid Susanne B Hagedorn Novik
- 4 Goals: (Sweden) Ida Friman
- 4 Goals: (Denmark) Tyra Felicia Vogstad
- 4 Goals: (Netherlands) Glynis Joseph Gertruda Barton
- 4 Goals: (Sweden) Moa Friman

== Tournament awards ==
The following players was named the best in their position in the 2025 tournament:

- MVP: (Sweden) Agnes Ögren
- Best goalkeeper: (United States) Sarah Ahlquist Scheider
- Best defender: (Sweden) Amanda Vainio
- Best midfielder: (Sweden) Ida Friman
- Best forward: (Norway) Laura Andresen Follesoe
