= 2020 Women's Bandy World Championship =

X Bandy World Championship

Tournament details
- Host country: Norway
- City: Oslo
- Venues: 3 (in 1 host city)
- Dates: 19–22 February 2020
- Teams: 8

Final positions
- Champions: Sweden (9th title)
- Runners-up: Russia
- Third place: Norway
- Fourth place: Finland

Tournament statistics
- Games played: 22
- Goals scored: 134 (6.09 per game)
- Attendance: 2,792 (127 per game)
- Scoring leader(s): (Sweden) Matilda Plan (Sweden) Tilda Ström (8 points)

Awards
- MVP: (Sweden) Matilda Plan

The 2020 Women's Bandy World Championship was held from 19 to 22 February 2020 in Oslo, Norway.

Eight teams participated in the tournament as China pulled out due to concerns about the coronavirus pandemic.

== Venues ==
Location of the venues within the city of Oslo

Frogner, Oslo		Sagene, Oslo		Nordre Aker, Oslo	
Frogner stadion		Voldsløkka idrettspark		Bergbanen	
		Voldsløkka_stadion			
Location	Norway	Location	Norway	Location	Norway
Constructed	Opened: 1914; Renovated: 2010	Constructed	2018	Constructed	
Capacity	4,200	Capacity		Capacity	

== Group stage ==
All times are local (UTC+1).

=== Group A ===
Pos	Team	Pld	W	D	L	GF	GA	GD	Pts	Qualification
1	Sweden	4	4	0	0	23	3	+20	8	Semifinals
2	Russia	4	3	0	1	13	4	+9	6	Semifinals
3	Norway (H)	4	1	1	2	4	15	−11	3	Semifinals
4	Finland	4	1	0	3	5	8	−3	2	Semifinals
5	United States	4	0	1	3	3	18	−15	1	Fifth place game

Source: FIB
(H) Hosts
19 February 2020
09:30

United States	1–1	Norway
Stech 29'	Report	Kvaal-Knutsen 17'
Penalties
	1–2

Voldsløkka Stadion, Oslo
Attendance: 304
Referee: (Sweden) Victoria Bergström
19 February 2020
11:30

Finland	0–1	Sweden
	Report	Fosselius 28'

Voldsløkka Stadion, Oslo
Attendance: 110
Referee: (Russia) Liliya Ibragimova
19 February 2020
13:30

Russia	6–0	United States
Gurinchik 3', 27', 58'; D. Lipanova 47' (p), 48'; Mashinskaya 50' (p)	Report

Voldsløkka Stadion, Oslo
Attendance: 43
Referee: (United States) Stephanie Johnson
19 February 2020
15:30

Norway	2–1	Finland
Selbekk 14'; Holm 46'	Report	Lohiniva 51'

Voldsløkka Stadion, Oslo
Attendance: 273
Referee: (Russia) Liliya Ibragimova
19 February 2020
17:30

Sweden	3–2	Russia
Ström 16'; Persson 26'; Svenler 59'	Report	Gurinchik 8', 22'

Voldsløkka Stadion, Oslo
Attendance: 127
Referee: (Sweden) Victoria Bergström

20 February 2020
10:30

Finland	1–3	Russia
Lohiniva 57'	Report	Bogdanova 43'; Mikhailova 45', 58'

Voldsløkka Stadion, Oslo
Attendance: 57
Referee: (Sweden) Victoria Bergström
20 February 2020
12:30

Sweden	8–0	United States
Ström 13', 35', 36', 48'; Larsson 14'; Plan 24'; Ahlander 26'; Östman 51'	Report

Voldsløkka Stadion, Oslo
Attendance: 58
Referee: (Norway) Evy Marie Holter
20 February 2020
14:30

Russia	2–0	Norway
Bogdanova 2'; Denisova 43'	Report

Voldsløkka Stadion, Oslo
Attendance: 74
Referee: (United States) Stephanie Johnson
20 February 2020
16:30

United States	2–3	Finland
Stech 15'; Meuwissen 60+3'	Report	Simola 30', 51'; Klemola 34'

Voldsløkka Stadion, Oslo
Attendance: 25
Referee: (Sweden) Victoria Bergström
20 February 2020
18:30

Norway	1–11	Sweden
Berntsen-Lillejord 51'	Report	Gustafsson 6'; Larsson 13', 49', 58'; Plan 17', 39'; Svenler 18'; Ström 19'; Persson 23', 55'; Östman 36'

Frogner stadion, Oslo
Attendance: 240
Referee: (Russia) Liliya Ibragimova

=== Group B ===
Pos	Team	Pld	W	D	L	GF	GA	GD	Pts	Qualification
1	Japan	4	4	0	0	18	8	+10	8	Fifth place game
2	Estonia	4	2	0	2	25	14	+11	4	Seventh place game
3	Switzerland	4	0	0	4	4	25	−21	0	Seventh place game

Source: FIB
19 February 2020
09:30

Estonia	10–2	Switzerland
	Report

Bergbanen, Oslo
Attendance: 15
Referee: (United States) Stephanie Johnson
19 February 2020
13:30

Switzerland	0–5	Japan
	Report

Bergbanen, Oslo
Attendance: 15
Referee: (Norway) Evy Marie Holter
19 February 2020
17:00

Japan	3–2	Estonia
	Report

Bergbanen, Oslo
Attendance: 20
Referee: (Norway) Evy Marie Holter

20 February 2020
09:30

Switzerland	0–3	Japan
	Report

Bergbanen, Oslo
Attendance: 15
Referee: (United States) Stephanie Johnson
20 February 2020
13:30

Estonia	7–2	Switzerland
	Report

Bergbanen, Oslo
Attendance: 2
Referee: (Russia) Liliya Ibragimova
20 February 2020
17:00

Japan	7–6	Estonia
	Report

Bergbanen, Oslo
Attendance: 10
Referee: (Norway) Evy Marie Holter

== Knockout stage ==
=== Bracket ===
Semifinals
21 February
Sweden	9
Finland	1
21 February
Russia	4
Norway	0

Final
22 February
Sweden	3
Russia	1
Third place
22 February
Norway	6
Finland	1

=== Semifinals ===
21 February 2020
11:00

Russia	4–0	Norway
Mashinskaya 20' (p); Mikhailova 25'; Gurinchik 51', 85'	Report

Frogner stadion, Oslo
Attendance: 217
Referee: (Sweden) Victoria Bergström
21 February 2020
14:00

Sweden	9–1	Finland
Friman 21'; Gustafsson 29'; Ahlander 31'; Plan 36', 46', 79'; Ström 72', 87'; Larsson 74'	Report	Sorsa 58'

Frogner stadion, Oslo
Attendance: 214
Referee: (Russia) Liliya Ibragimova

=== Seventh place game ===
21 February 2020
11:00

Estonia	9–0	Switzerland
Prokofeva 8', 11', 28', 47', 63', 83'; Tataurova 24' (p), 44'; Mahla 86'	Report

Bergbanen, Oslo
Attendance: 5
Referee: (United States) Stephanie Johnson

=== Fifth place game ===
21 February 2020
11:00

United States	5–0	Japan
Carroll 10', 46'; Engebretson 57'; Johnson 77'; Wanecke 88'	Report

Voldsløkka Stadion, Oslo
Attendance: 28
Referee: (Norway) Evy Marie Holter

=== Third place game ===
22 February 2020
11:00

Norway	6–1	Finland
Borge 8'; Holm 12'; Bakke 22'; Follesø 27', 71'; Berntsen-Lillejord 30'	Report	Segerman 17'

Frogner stadion, Oslo
Attendance: 428
Referee: (Russia) Liliya Ibragimova

=== Final ===
22 February 2020
14:00

Sweden	3–1	Russia
Plan 7', 47'; Ahlander 66' (p)	Report	D. Lipanova 56'

Frogner stadion, Oslo
Attendance: 512
Referee: (Sweden) Victoria Bergström

== Final ranking ==
Rank	Team
1st place, gold medalist(s)	Sweden
2nd place, silver medalist(s)	Russia
3rd place, bronze medalist(s)	Norway
4	Finland
5	United States
6	Japan
7	Estonia
8	Switzerland

== Tournament awards ==
The following players was named the best in their position in the 2020 tournament:

- MVP: (Sweden) Matilda Plan
- Best goalkeeper: (Sweden) Sara Carlström
- Best defender: (Sweden) Malin Kuul
- Best midfielder: (Russia) Galina Mikhaylova
- Best forward: (Sweden) Tilda Ström
- Fair play: Japan
