= 2023 Women's Bandy World Championship =

2023 edition of the Women's Bandy World Championship

12th Women's Bandy World Championship

Tournament details
- Host country: Sweden
- City: Växjö (Åby), Sweden
- Venue: Eriksson Arena (in 1 host city)
- Dates: 28 March – 2 April
- Teams: 6

Final positions
- Champions: Sweden (11th title)
- Runners-up: Finland
- Third place: United States
- Fourth place: Netherlands

Tournament statistics
- Games played: 16
- Goals scored: 65 (4.06 per game)
- Attendance: 3,485 (218 per game)
- Scoring leader: (Sweden) Tilda Ström (11 points)

Awards
- MVP: (Sweden) Tilda Ström

Official website
- 2023 Men's and Women's Bandy World Championship 2023

The 2023 Women's Bandy World Championship (officially the 2023 Bandy World Championship) was played in Åby, a subdivision of Växjö City in Sweden between women's national bandy teams. The competition took place from 28 March – 2 April 2023. This tournament also marked the Ukraine women's national bandy team's eventual world debut. The Ukraine squad was earlier scheduled to participate in the 2022 Women's Bandy World Championship but was forced to withdraw due to the Russian invasion of Ukraine.

This world championship for women's international bandy marked a departure in the sport whereas in the past, organizers traditionally hosted the men's and women's international competitions separately, but this season saw both tournaments held at the same time and in the same venue. The tournament will crown the world champions for the Women's Bandy World Championship and the men's Bandy World Championship.

== Venue ==
All matches were played in Eriksson Arena, Åby.

Both men's and women's games take place in Åby, a subdivision of Växjö City in Sweden	Sweden	
Both men's and women's games take place in Åby, a subdivision of Växjö City in Sweden	Åby	
Both men's and women's games take place in Åby, a subdivision of Växjö City in Sweden	Venue; Eriksson Arena; Capacity: 2,000	
Both men's and women's games take place in Åby, a subdivision of Växjö City in Sweden	Founded	13 November 2019

== Doping detection dog ==
The world's first doping detection dog was present for the tournament, an 8-year-old Springer Spaniel named Molly. Molly was utilized to detect certain banned substances that are not allowed as per the World Anti-Doping Agency's (WADA) prohibited list.

== Competing nations ==
Sweden
Finland
United States
Netherlands
Ukraine
Switzerland

== Group stage ==
All games 2 x 30 minutes.

=== Pool A ===
Pos	Team	Pld	W	D	L	GF	GA	GD	Pts	Qualification
1	Sweden (H)	4	4	0	0	20	0	+20	8	Final
2	Finland	4	0	2	2	2	12	−10	2	Playoffs
3	United States	4	0	2	2	2	12	−10	2	Playoffs

Source: FIB
(H) Hosts
29 March 2023
10:00

Finland	1–1	United States
Jenna Grönros 46'	Report	Jordan Schlidhaus 49'

Eriksson Arena, Åby
Attendance: 115
Referee: Ida Salomonsson
29 March 2023
19:00

United States	0–5	Sweden
	Report	Ida Friman 2', 20'; Tilda Ström 18', 44'; Linnea Larsson 42'

Eriksson Arena, Åby
Attendance: 302
Referee: Ida Salomonsson

30 March 2023
12:30

United States	1–1	Finland
Corinne Henning 48'	Report	Petra Verhelä 62'

Eriksson Arena, Åby
Attendance: 62
Referee: Jonas Kandell
30 March 2023
19:00

Sweden	6–0	Finland
Linnea Larsson 0'; Tilda Ström 11'; Ida Friman 15', 35'; Sanna Gustafsson 24'; Gabriella Aronsson 51'	Report

Eriksson Arena, Åby
Attendance: 176
Referee: Steph Johnsson

31 March 2023
10:00

Sweden	5–0	United States
Gabriella Aronsson 14'; Karla Thuresson 20'; Emma Ahlander 48'; Mathilda Eklund 66'; Linnea Larsson 72'	Report

Eriksson Arena, Åby
Attendance: 176
Referee: Ida Salomonsson
31 March 2023
17:00

Finland	0–4	Sweden
	Report	Emma Ahlander 9'; Tilda Ström 12', 35'; Karla Thuresson 29'

Eriksson Arena, Åby
Attendance: 560
Referee: Steph Lynn Johnson

=== Pool B ===
Pos	Team	Pld	W	D	L	GF	GA	GD	Pts	Qualification
1	Netherlands	4	3	1	0	11	1	+10	7	Bronze game
2	Switzerland	4	2	1	1	2	2	0	5	5th place game
3	Ukraine	4	0	0	4	1	11	−10	0	5th place game

Source: FIB
29 March 2023
8:00

Ukraine	0–1	Switzerland
	Report	Chanel Gilomen 58'

Eriksson Arena, Åby
Attendance: 81
Referee: Mats Eriksson
29 March 2023
14:30

Switzerland	0–2	Netherlands
	Report	Leanne van der Wielen 1', 8'

Eriksson Arena, Åby
Attendance: 25
Referee: Stephan Lynn Johnsson

30 March 2023
8:00

Netherlands	5–1	Ukraine
Lotte Krebaum 26'; Michelle Nöe 33', 36'; Britt Wortel 41'; Leanne van der Wielen 53'	Report	Olena Tkachuk 11'

Eriksson Arena, Åby
Attendance: 41
Referee: Stephanie Johnson
30 March 2023
14:30

Switzerland	1–0	Ukraine
Sophie Raymond 58'	Report

Eriksson Arena, Åby
Attendance: 26
Referee: Mats-Olof Gustaffson

31 March 2023
8:00

Netherlands	0–0	Switzerland
	Report

Eriksson Arena, Åby
Attendance: 83
Referee: Jonas Kandell
31 March 2023
15:00

Ukraine	0–4	Netherlands
	Report	Lisette van der Kammen 1'; Glynis Barton 10'; Esther de Jong 33'; Michelle van Ooijen 44'

Eriksson Arena, Åby
Attendance: 112
Referee: Ida Salomonsson

== Final Round ==
=== Playoffs ===
1 April 2023
14:00

United States	1–1 (Penalty Shootout) 2–3	Finland
Katie Rooney 19'	Report	Lina Lempinen 87'

Eriksson Arena, Åby
Attendance: 177
Referee: Ida Salomonsson

=== Fifth place game ===
1 April 2023
14:00

Switzerland	1–0	Ukraine
Kayla Ramseir 63'	Report

Eriksson Arena, Åby
Attendance: 31
Referee: Steph Johnsson

=== Bronze game ===
2 April 2023
7:45

United States	4–0	Netherlands
Kalli Funk 12'; Amy Stech 23'; Mollie Ray Carroll 33'; Tam Meuwissen 42'	Report

Eriksson Arena, Åby
Attendance: 62
Referee: Steph Johnson

=== Final ===
2 April 2023
13:00

Sweden	15–0	Finland
Tilda Ström 4', 28', 31', 47', 56', 67'; Karla Thuresson 8', 54'; Mathilda Eklund 24'; Linnea Larsson 38', 51'; Sanna Gustafsson 49', 78'; Ida Friman 52'; Agnes Ögren 86'	Report

Eriksson Arena, Åby
Attendance: 1,516
Referee: Ida Salomonsson

== Final ranking ==
Rank	Team
1st place, gold medalist(s)	Sweden
2nd place, silver medalist(s)	Finland
3rd place, bronze medalist(s)	United States
4	Netherlands
5	Switzerland
6	Ukraine

== Tournament awards ==
The following players was named the best in their position in the 2023 tournament:

- MVP: (Sweden) Ida Friman
- Best goalkeeper: (Finland) Emilia Piekkari
- Best defender: (United States) Mikayla Rogers / (Sweden) Viktoria Karlsson
- Best midfielder: (Sweden) Ida Friman
- Best forward: (Sweden) Tilda Ström
