= Chengde Mountain Resort =

Palace complex and garden in Hebei, China

Mountain Resort, Chengde
UNESCO World Heritage Site
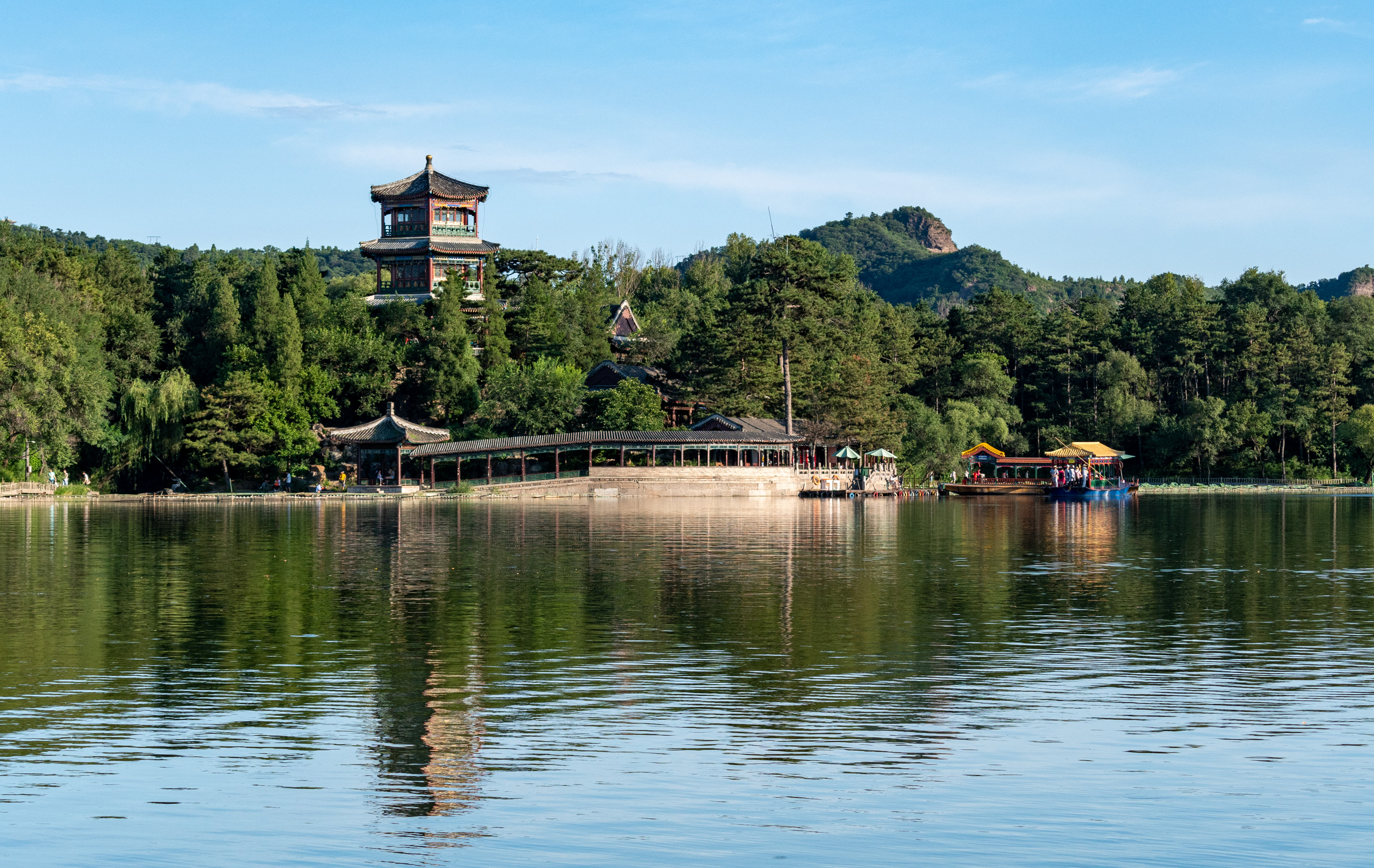
- Mountain Resort, Chengde

- Location within Hebei Location within China
- Location: Shuangqiao District, China
- Part of: Mountain Resort and its Outlying Temples, Chengde
- Criteria: Cultural: (ii), (iv)
- Reference: 703
- Inscription: 1994 (18th Session)
- Coordinates: 40°59′15″N 117°56′15″E

Chengde Mountain Resort

Chinese name
- Simplified Chinese: 避暑山庄
- Traditional Chinese: 避暑山莊
- Literal meaning: Mountain Estate for Avoiding the Heat
Transcriptions
Standard Mandarin
- Hanyu Pinyin: Bìshǔ Shānzhuāng
- Wade–Giles: Pi-shu Shan-chuang

Ligong
- Simplified Chinese: 离宫
- Traditional Chinese: 離宮
- Literal meaning: detached palace
Transcriptions
Standard Mandarin
- Hanyu Pinyin: Lígōng
- Wade–Giles: Li-kung

Manchu name
- Manchu script: ᡥᠠᠯᡥᡡᠨ ᠪᡝ ᠵᠠᡳ᠌ᠯᠠᡵᠠ ᡤᡠᡵᡠᠩ
- Romanization: Halhūn be jailara gurung

Chengde Mountain Resort (Chinese: 承德避暑山庄; Manchu: ᡥᠠᠯᡥᡡᠨ ᠪᡝ ᠵᠠᡳ᠌ᠯᠠᡵᠠ ᡤᡠᡵᡠᠩ Halhūn be jailara gurung) is a large complex of imperial palaces and gardens situated in the Shuangqiao District of Chengde in northeastern Hebei province, northern China, about 225 kilometres (140 mi) northeast of China's capital Beijing. This resort was frequently used as a summer vacation place before the Kuomintang Republic of China. Because of its vast and rich collection of Chinese landscapes and architecture, Chengde Mountain Resort in many ways is a culmination of all the variety of gardens, pagodas, temples and palaces from various regions of China. In 1994, The Mountain Resort was awarded World Heritage Site status.

Chengde is one of China's four famous gardens, national relic protection unit and Class 5A Tourist Attractions in China.

== Name ==
Chengde Mountain Resort is also sometimes called Rehe Xinggong (热河行宫) or Ligong (离宫).

== History ==
1875 map of the resort

Built between 1703 and 1792 by Chinese architects, the Mountain Resort took 89 years to complete. It covers a total area of 5.6 km^{2} (2.2 sq mi), almost half of Chengde's urban area. It is a vast complex of palaces and administrative and ceremonial buildings. Temples of various Chinese architectural styles and gardens blend harmoniously into a landscape of lakes, pastureland and forests.

The rulers of the Qing regime often spent several months a year here to escape the summer heat in the capital city of Beijing and the palace zone in the southern part of the resort was therefore designed to resemble the Forbidden City in Beijing. It consists of two parts: a court in front, where the emperor received high officials, nobles of various minority nationalities, and foreign envoys; and bed chambers in the rear, which were the imperial family's living quarters, notably the Yanbozhishuang Hall, where the Kangxi spent a total of 12 summers while the Qianlong spent 52 summers in the hall during the course of their reign.

== Climate ==
Chengde Mountain Resort is located in the transition zone from warm temperate zone to cold temperate zone. It has semi - temperate, semi - arid continental monsoon climate. It has a large difference in temperature between day and night. In winter, it is cold and has little snow. It has many thundershowers in summer, leading to few hot periods. Chengde Mountain Resort is suitable for traveling in every season, but best from April to October.

== Scenic spots ==
The Mountain Resort is most famous for the 72 scenic spots which were named by the Kangxi and Qianlong emperors. Many of the scenic spots around the resort's lake area were copied from famous landscaped gardens in southern China. For instance, the main building on the Green Lotus Island, "Tower of Mist and Rain," (烟雨楼; 煙雨樓; Yānyǔ Lóu) is modeled upon a tower at the Nanhu Lake at Jiaxing in Zhejiang Province.

The resort's plain area also possesses characteristics of the scenery of the Mongolian grasslands. Forested mountains and valleys are dotted with various buildings. This includes a 70-meter (230 ft)-tall stone Chinese pagoda, one of the tallest in China, built in 1751 during the reign of the Qianlong Emperor. The pagoda is shaped with an octagonal base, while the pagoda's nine stories are decorated with colorful glazed tiles and the steeple is crowned with a gilded round spire.

In December 1994 the Mountain Resort was listed by UNESCO on its list of World Heritage Sites.

== Events ==
The 2018 Women's Bandy World Championship was held at a naturally frozen ice at the lake in the complex.

== Gallery ==
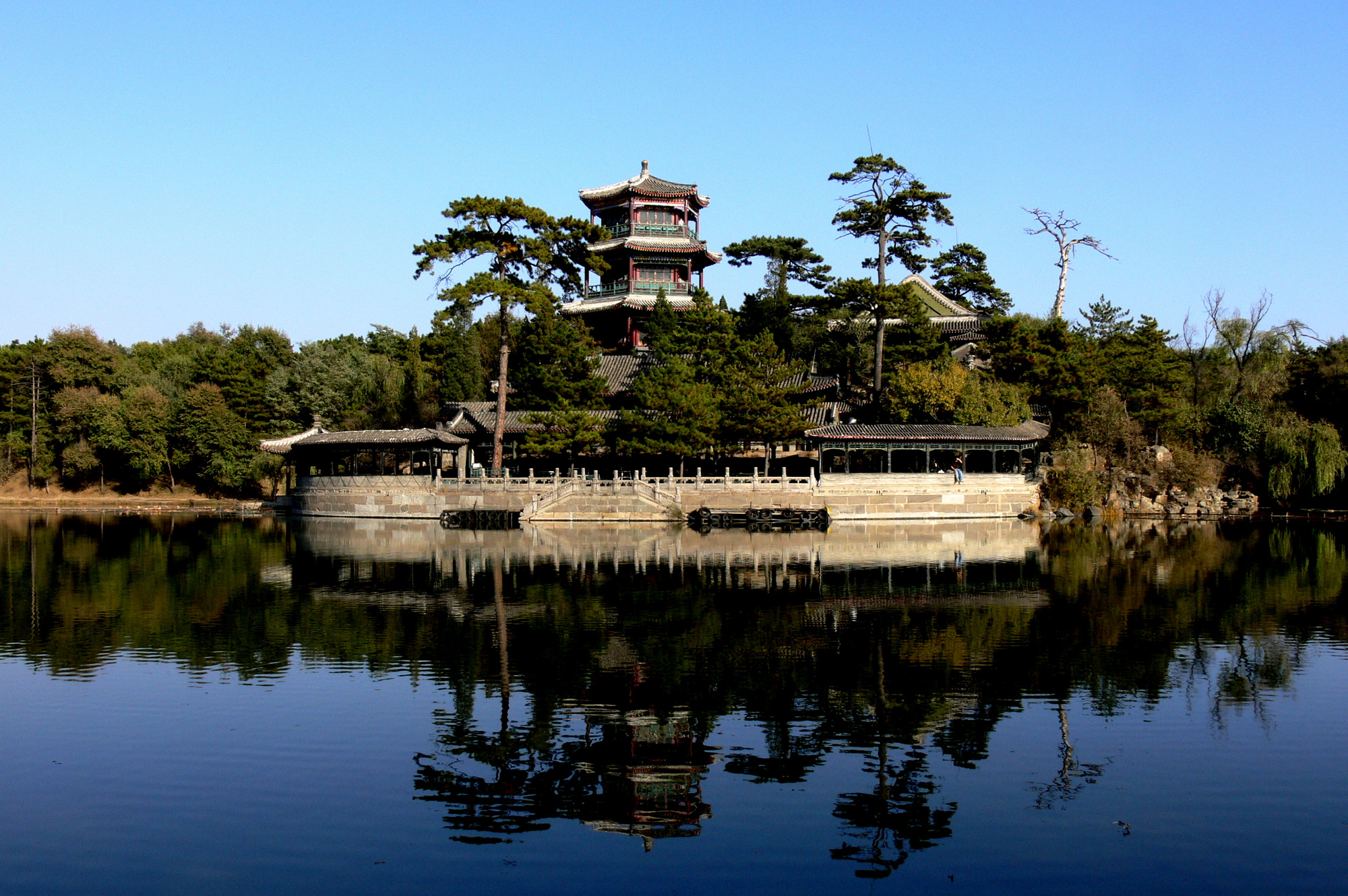
A tower on the Little Golden Mountain

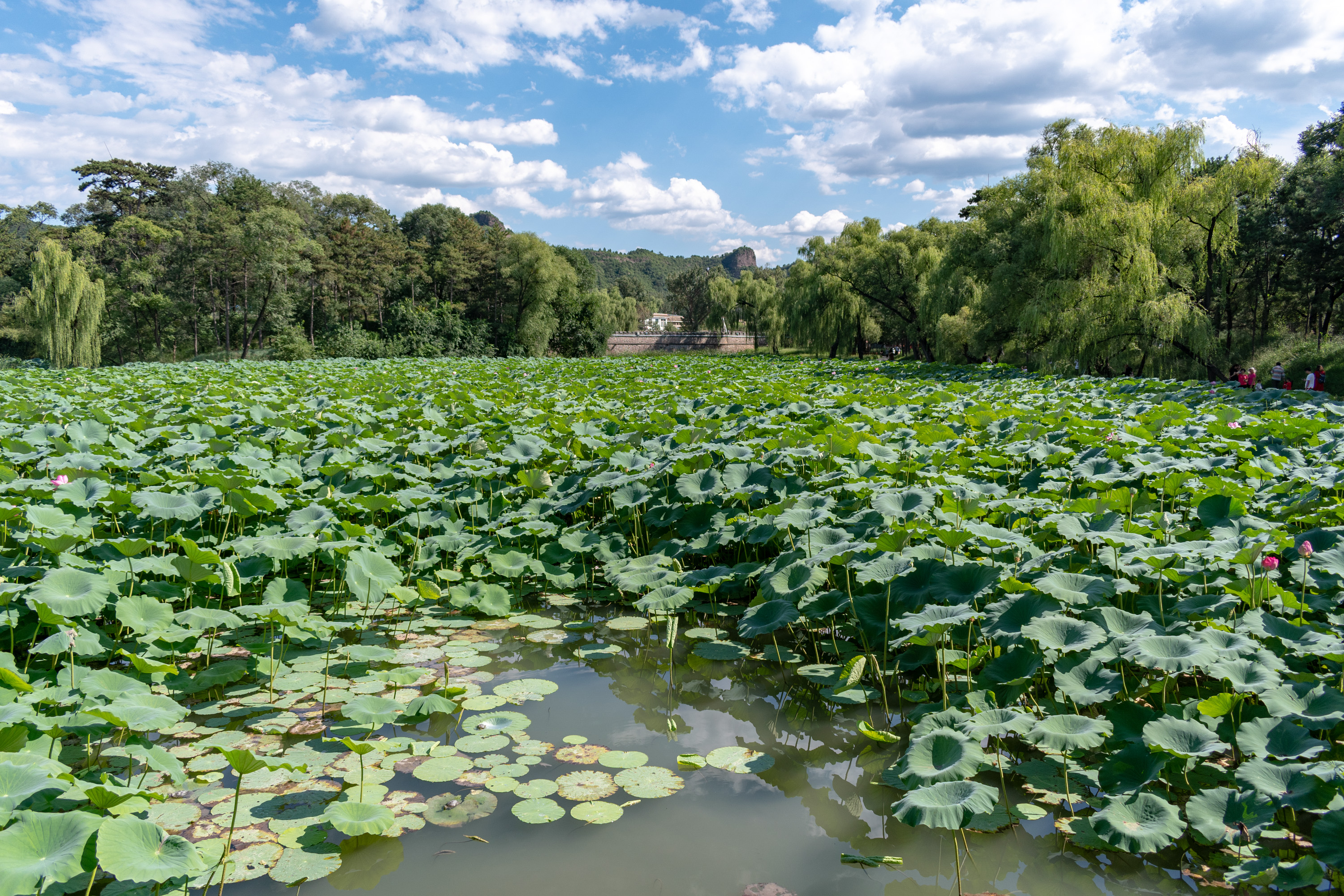
A pond of lotuses

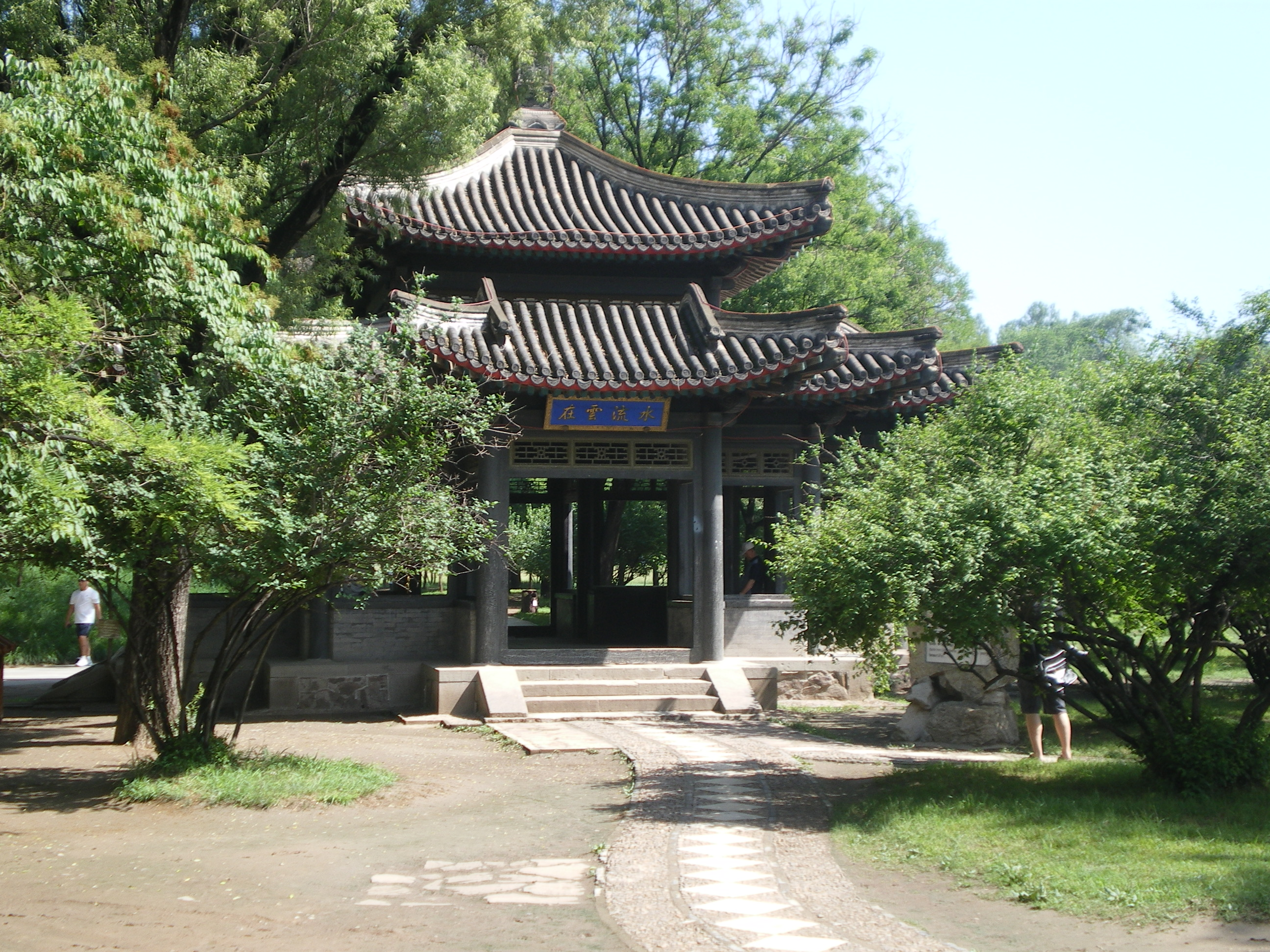
One of the many pavilions inside the complex

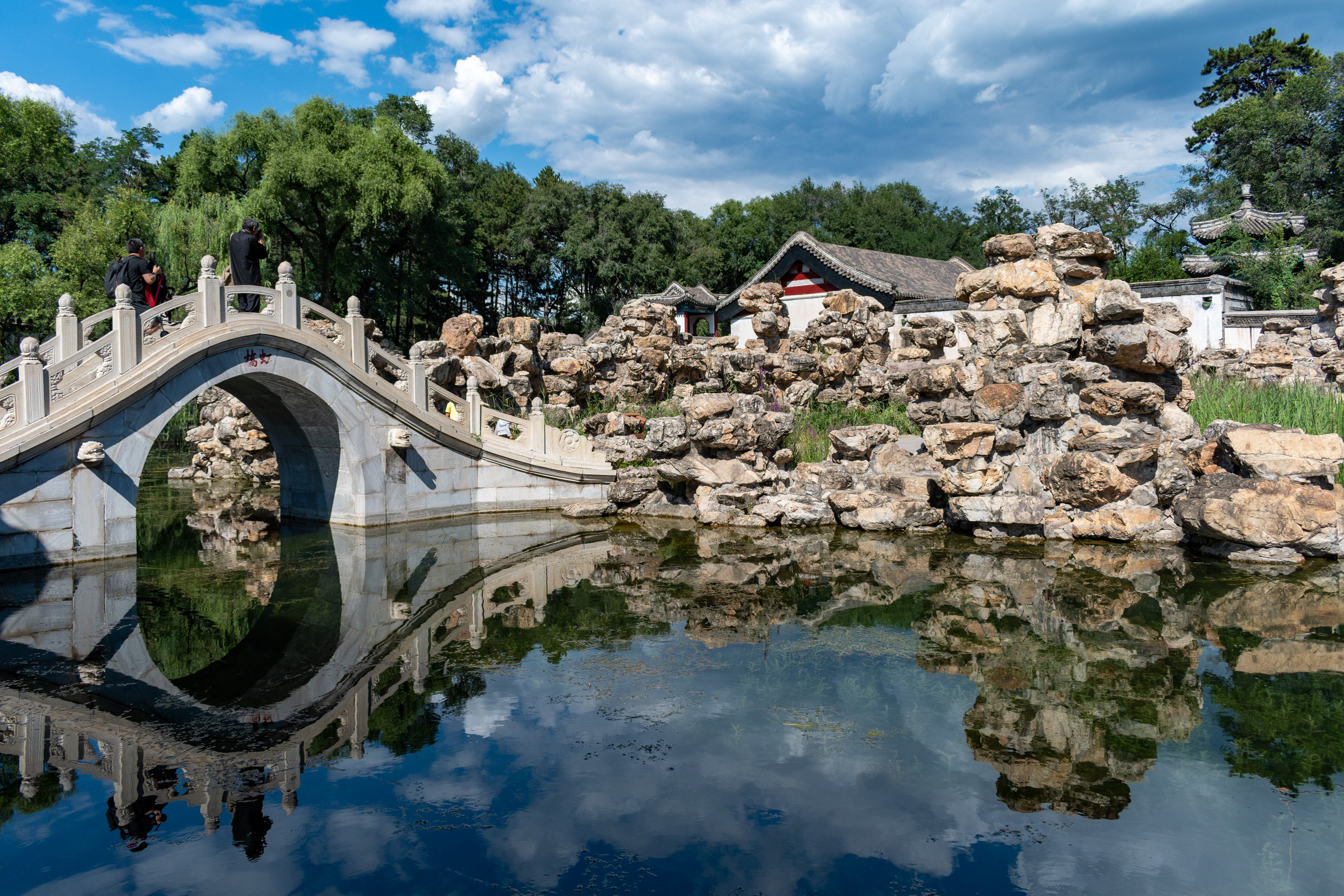
The Mountain Resort is dotted with lakes and gardens that imitate landscapes from around China

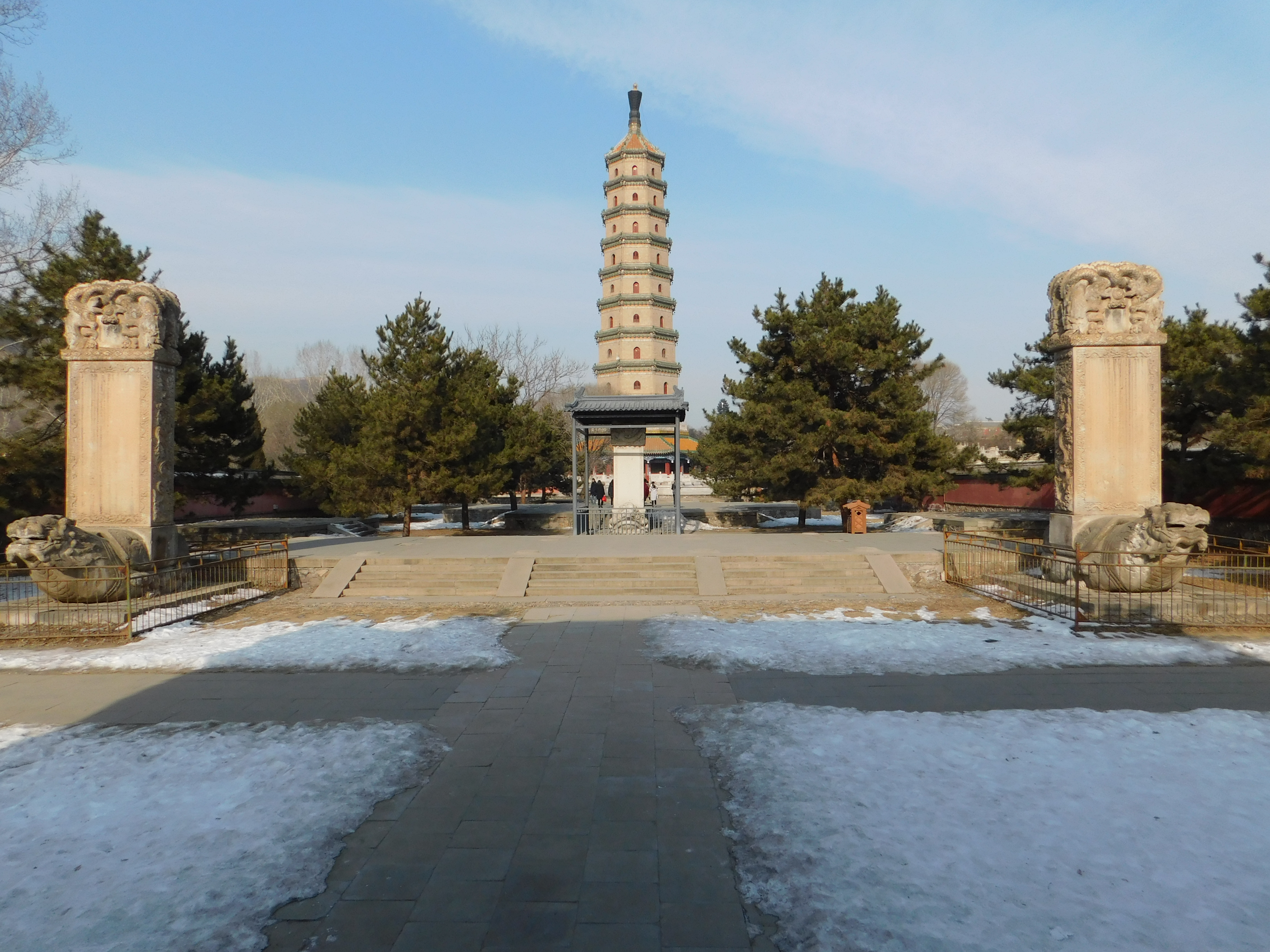
Yongyou Temple and its pagoda

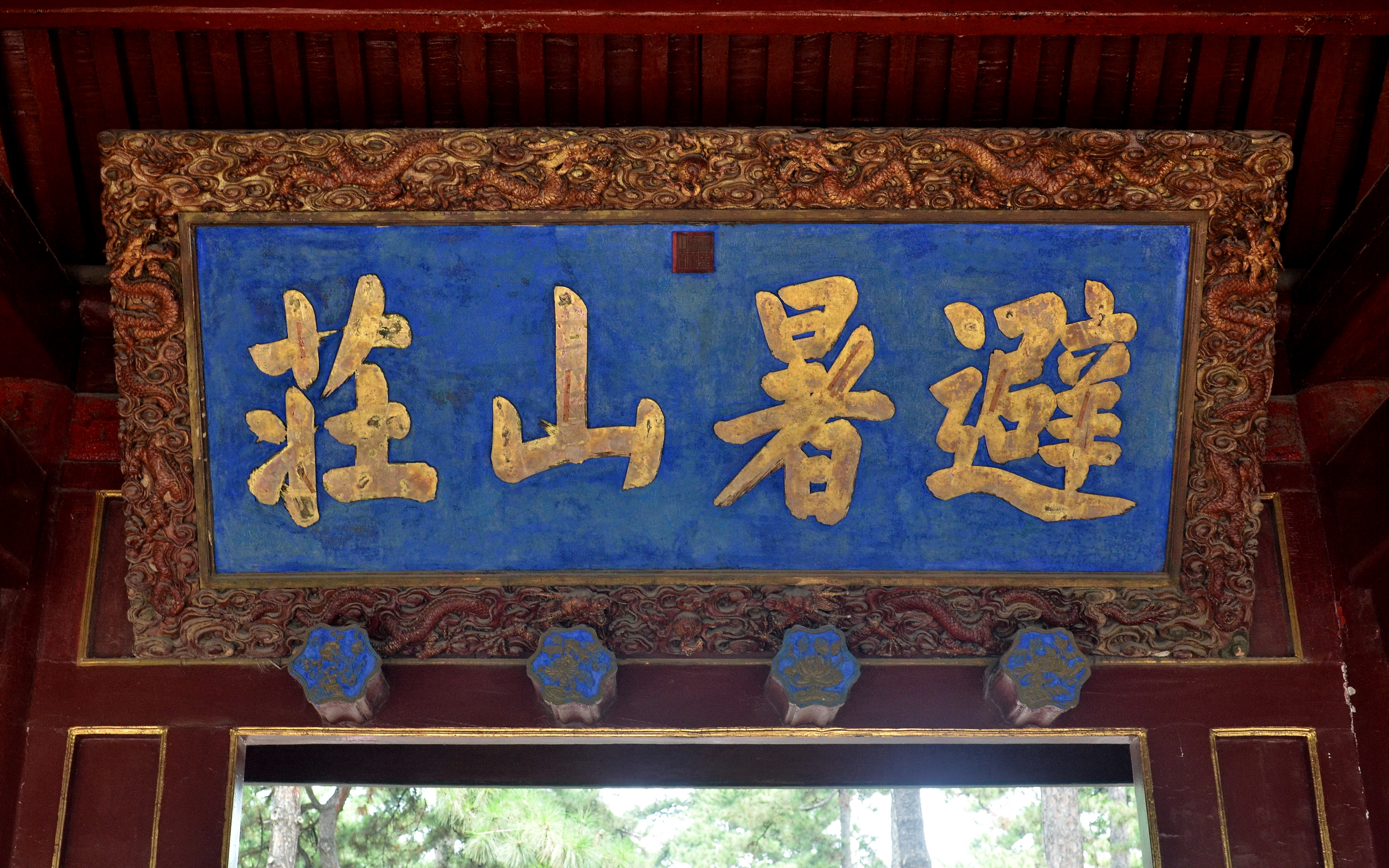
The Kangxi Emperor inscription dragon board

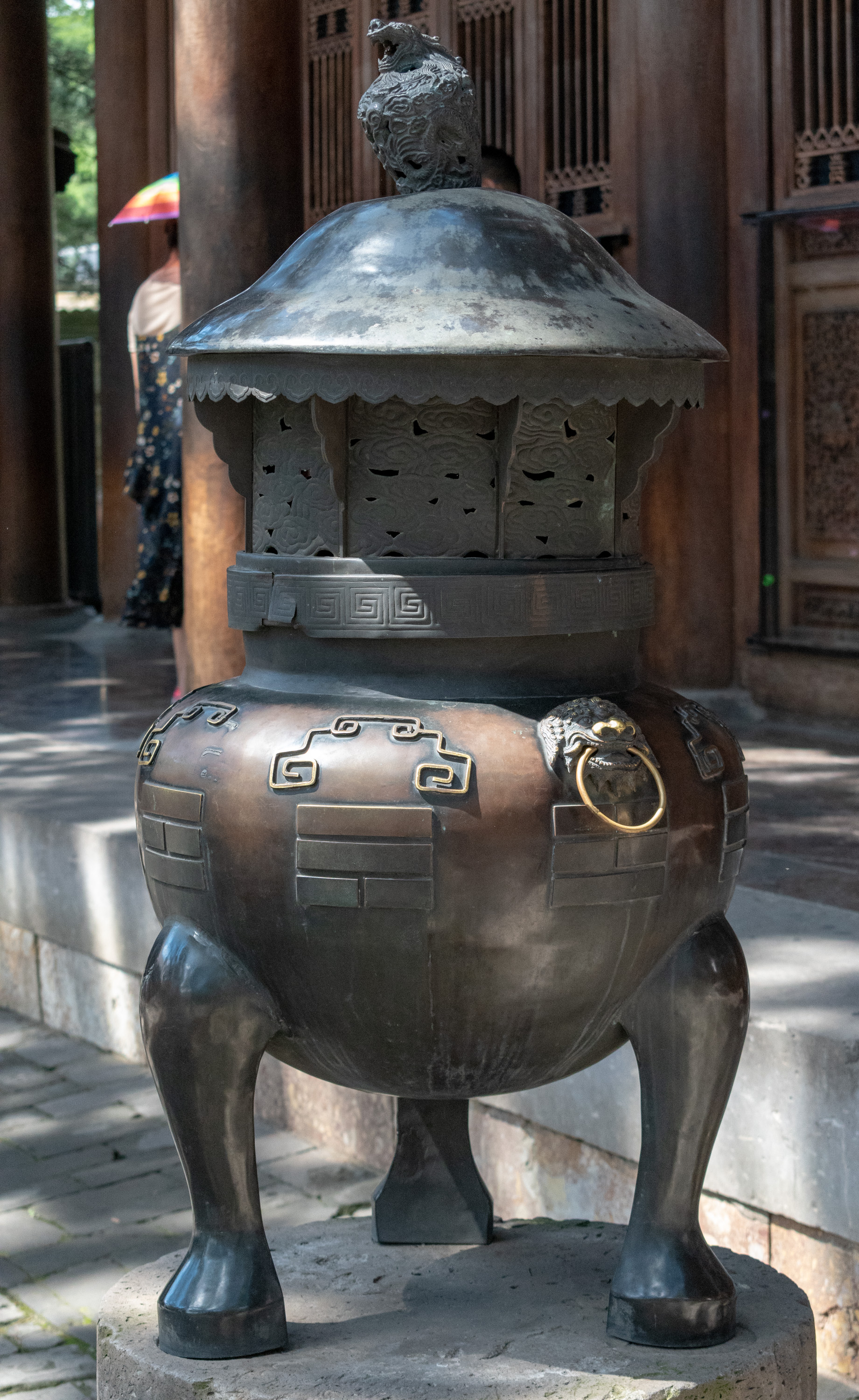
A Censer

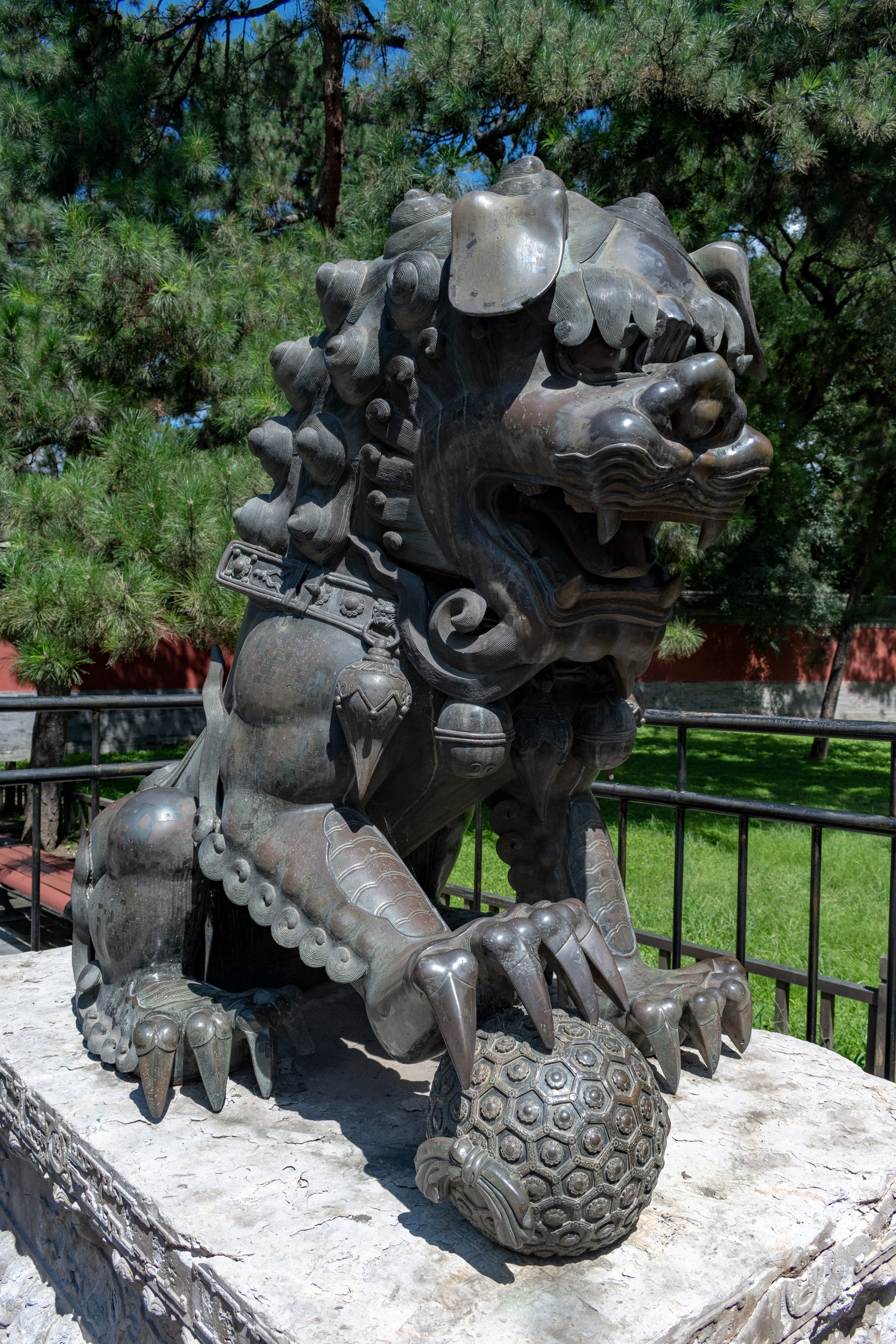
A Chinese guardian lion

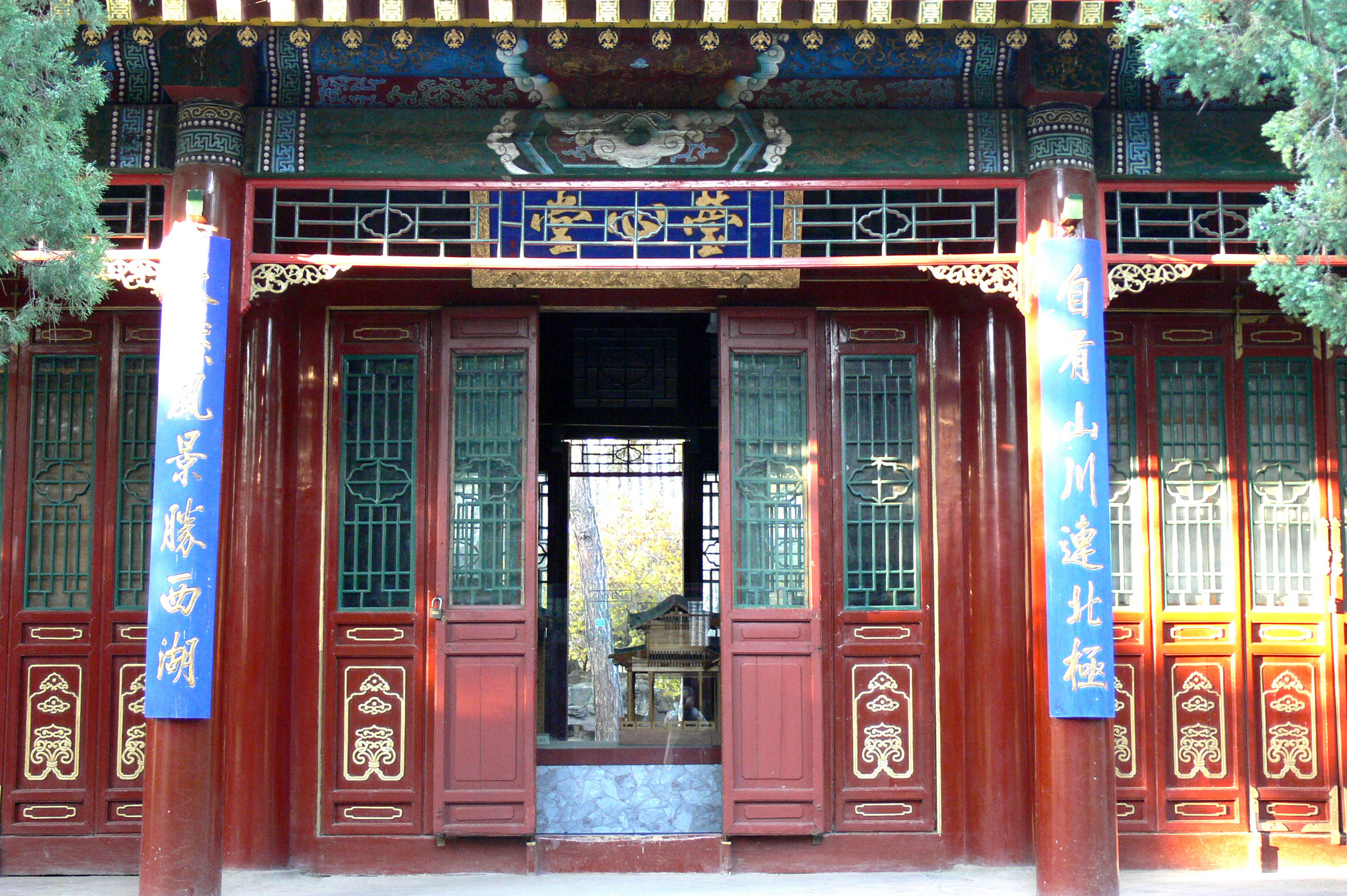
An example of a grid door

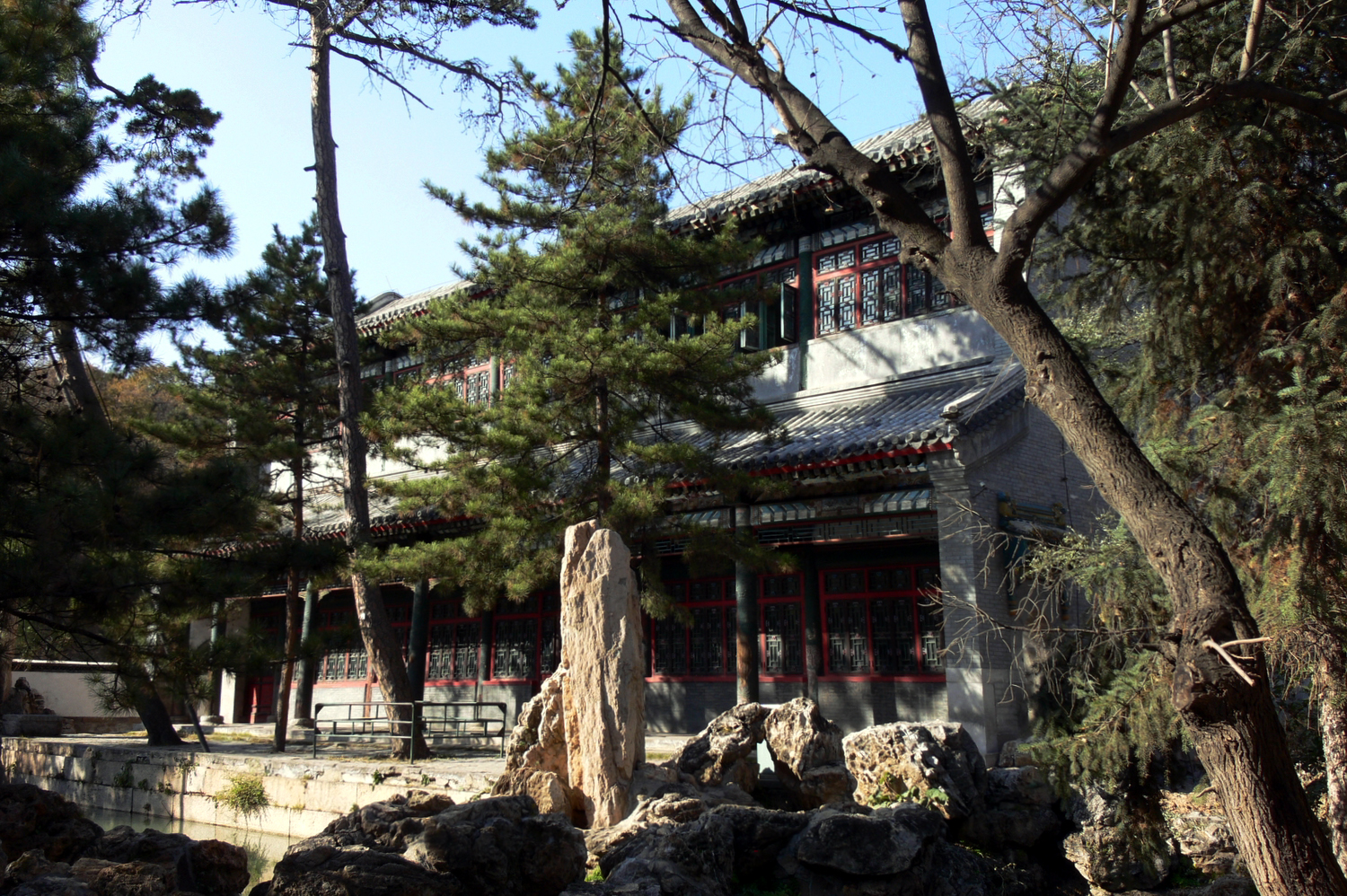
The Wenjin Chamber

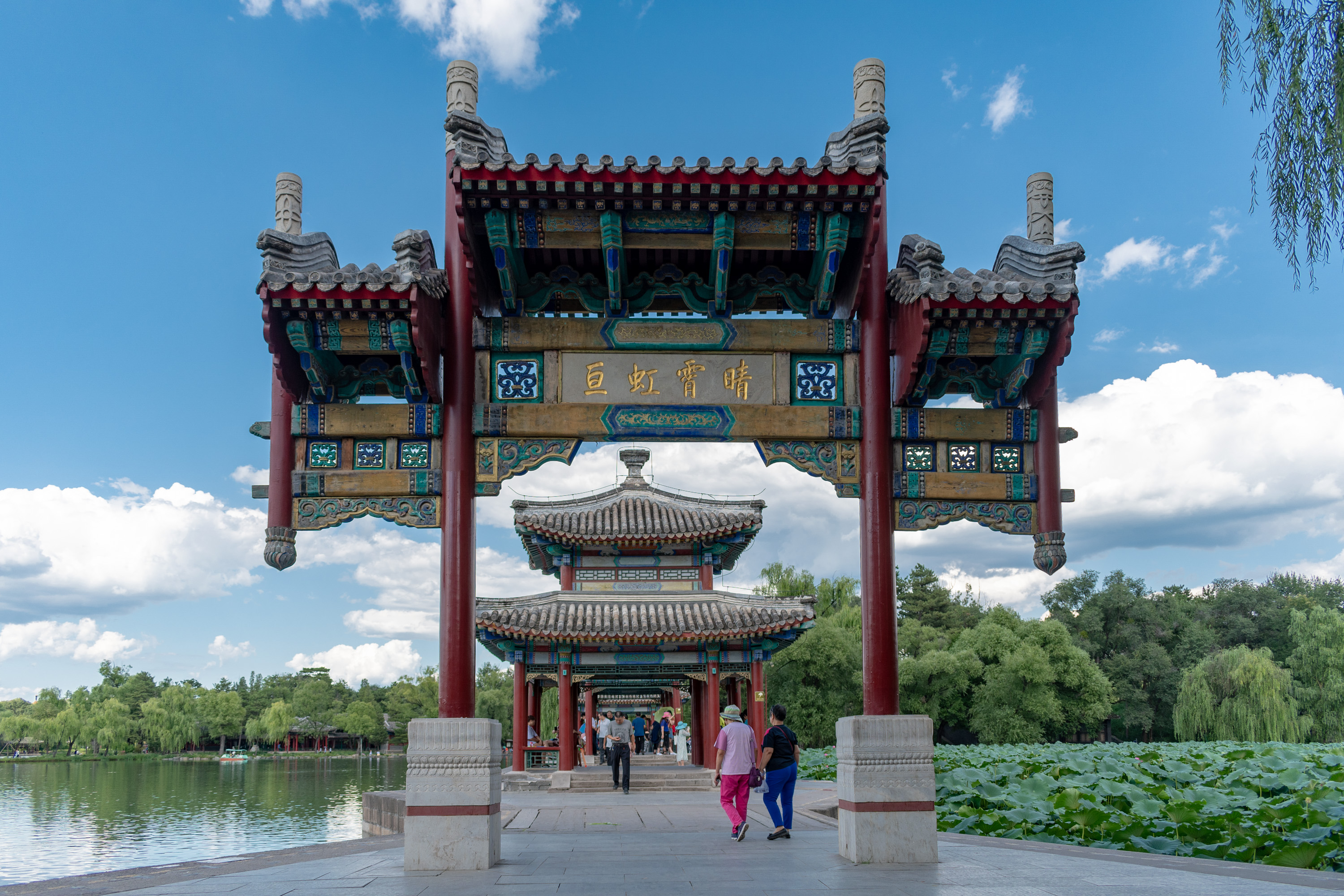
Paifang and series of pavillons

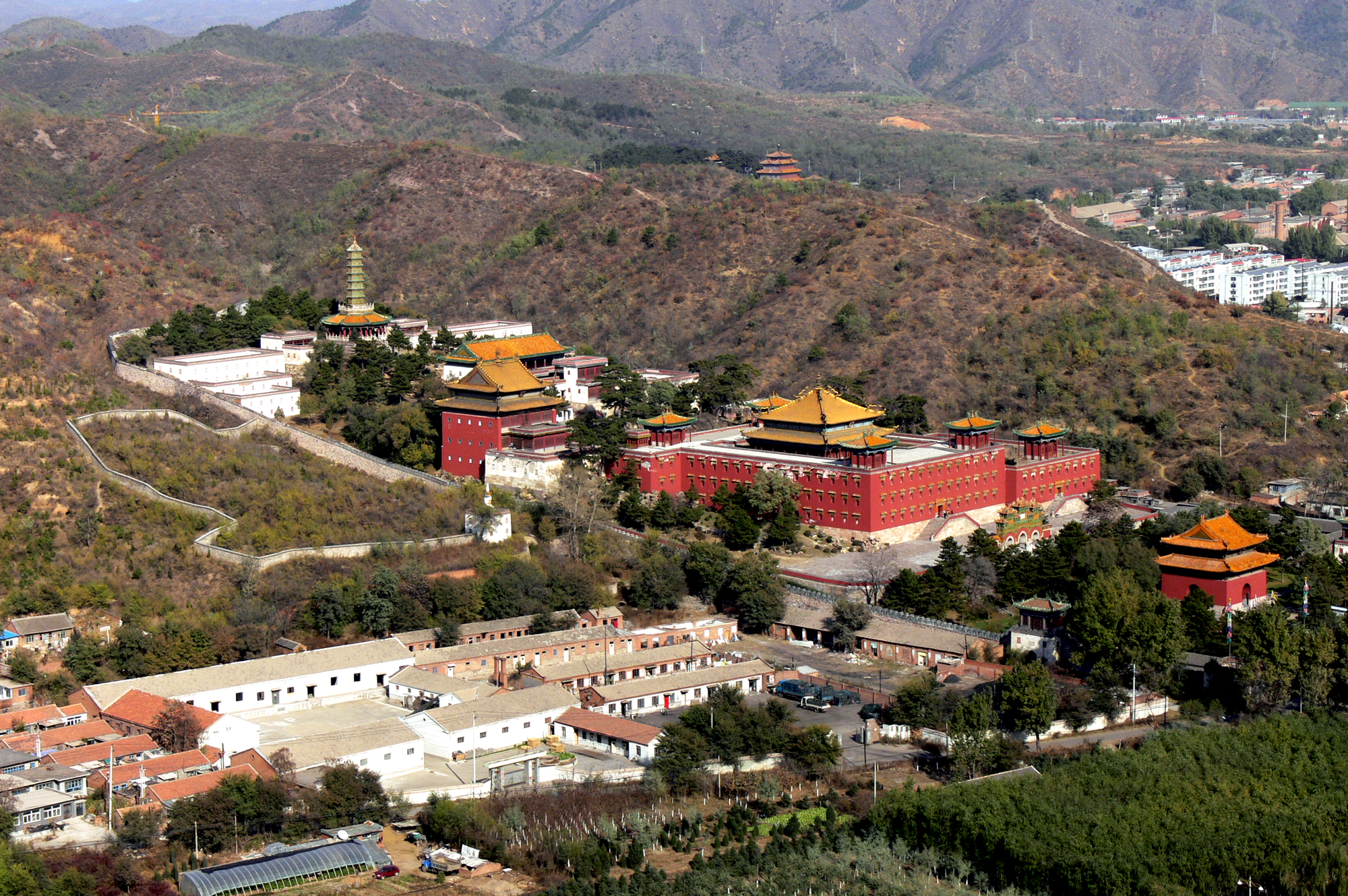
Bird's eye view of Xumi Fushou Temple from top of a hill in the Mountain Resort

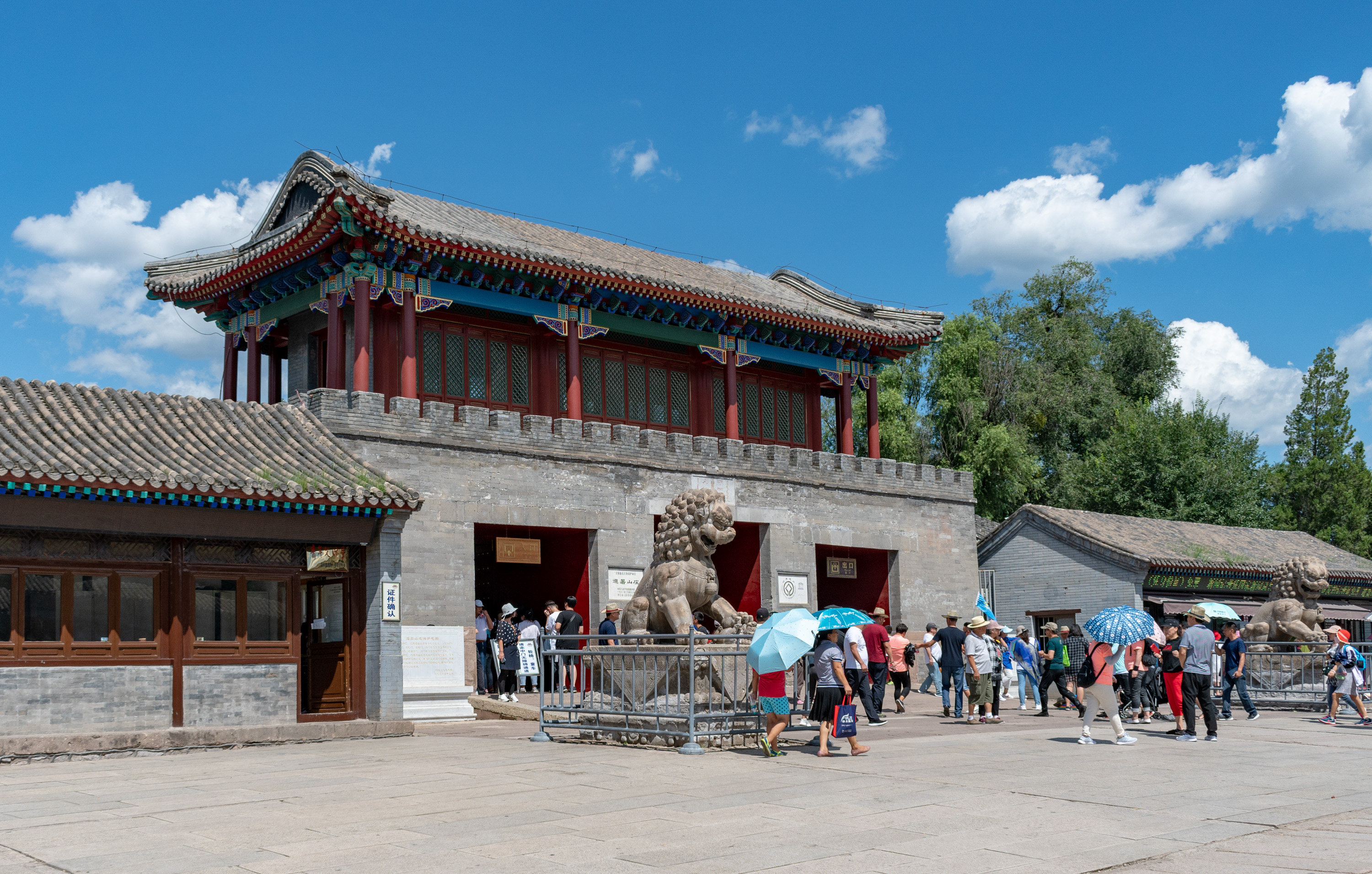
Lizheng Gate, entrance reserved for the Qing emperors

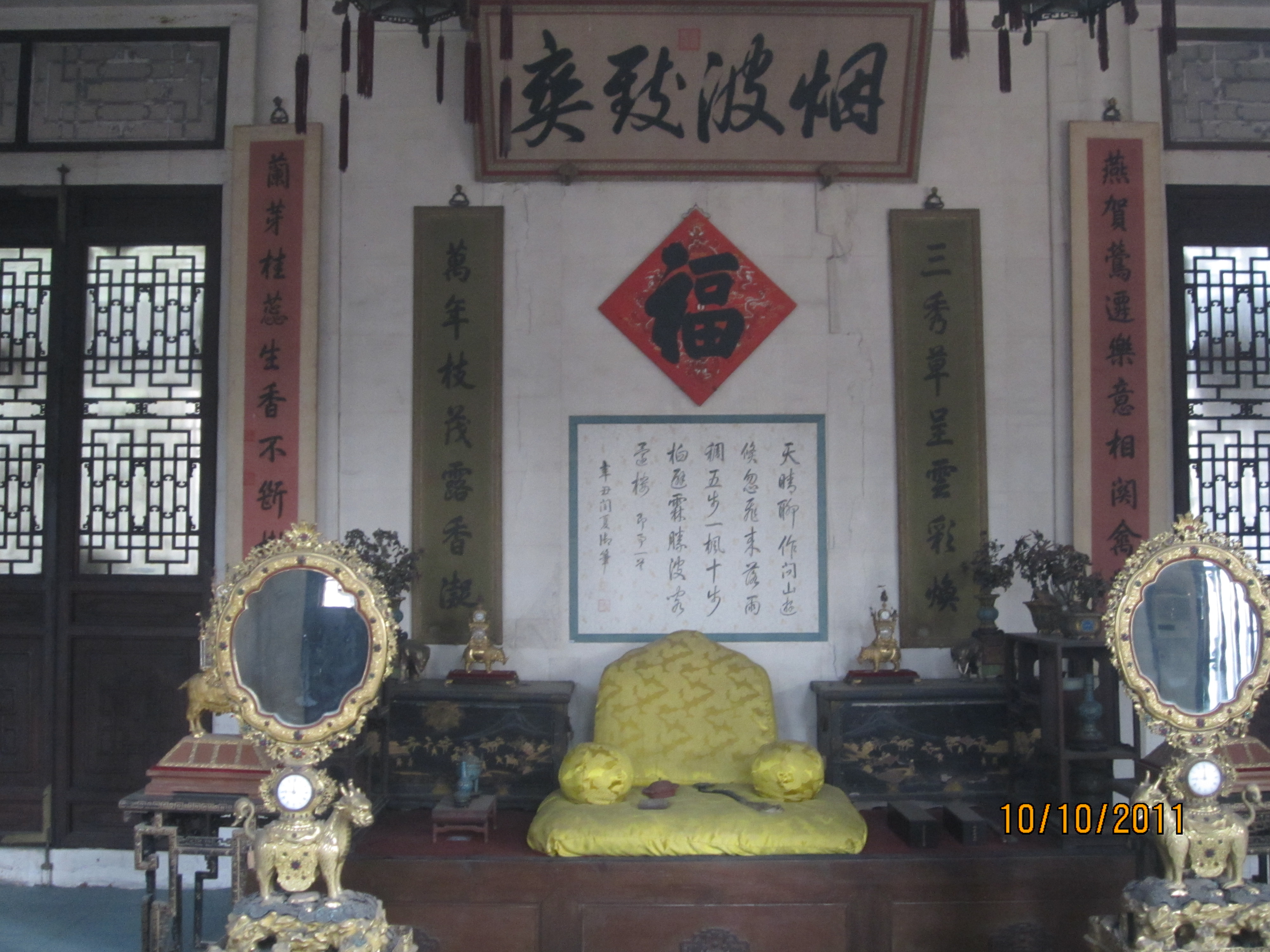
Yanbozhishuang Hall, where Jiaqing Emperor and Xianfeng Emperor died on September 2, 1820, and August 22, 1861, respectively

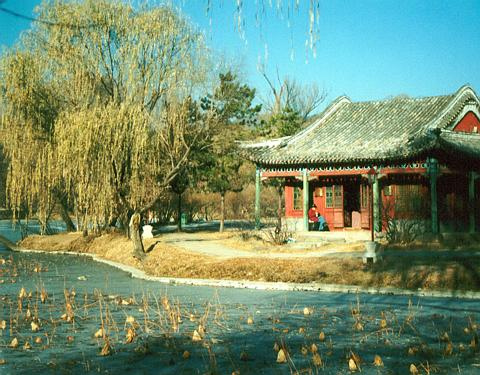
Ice on the lake where the 2018 Women's Bandy World Championship was played

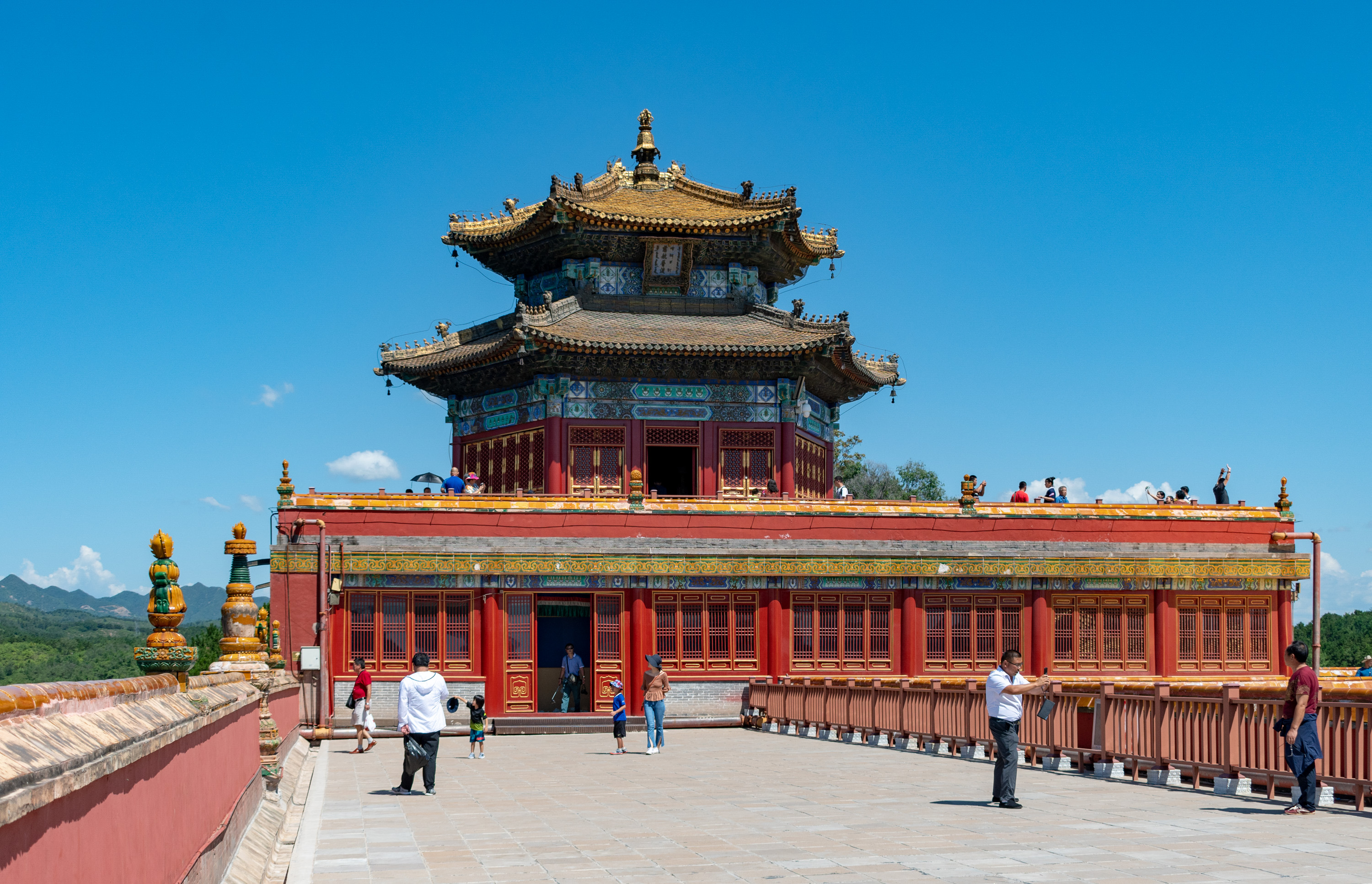
Putuo Zongcheng Temple

== See also ==
- Summer Palace
- Putuo Zongcheng Temple
- Puning Temple
