= Voldsløkka Stadion =

Sports stadium in Oslo, Norway

Coordinates: 59°56′36″N 10°45′24″E

Voldsløkka Stadion is a sports stadium in Oslo, Norway.

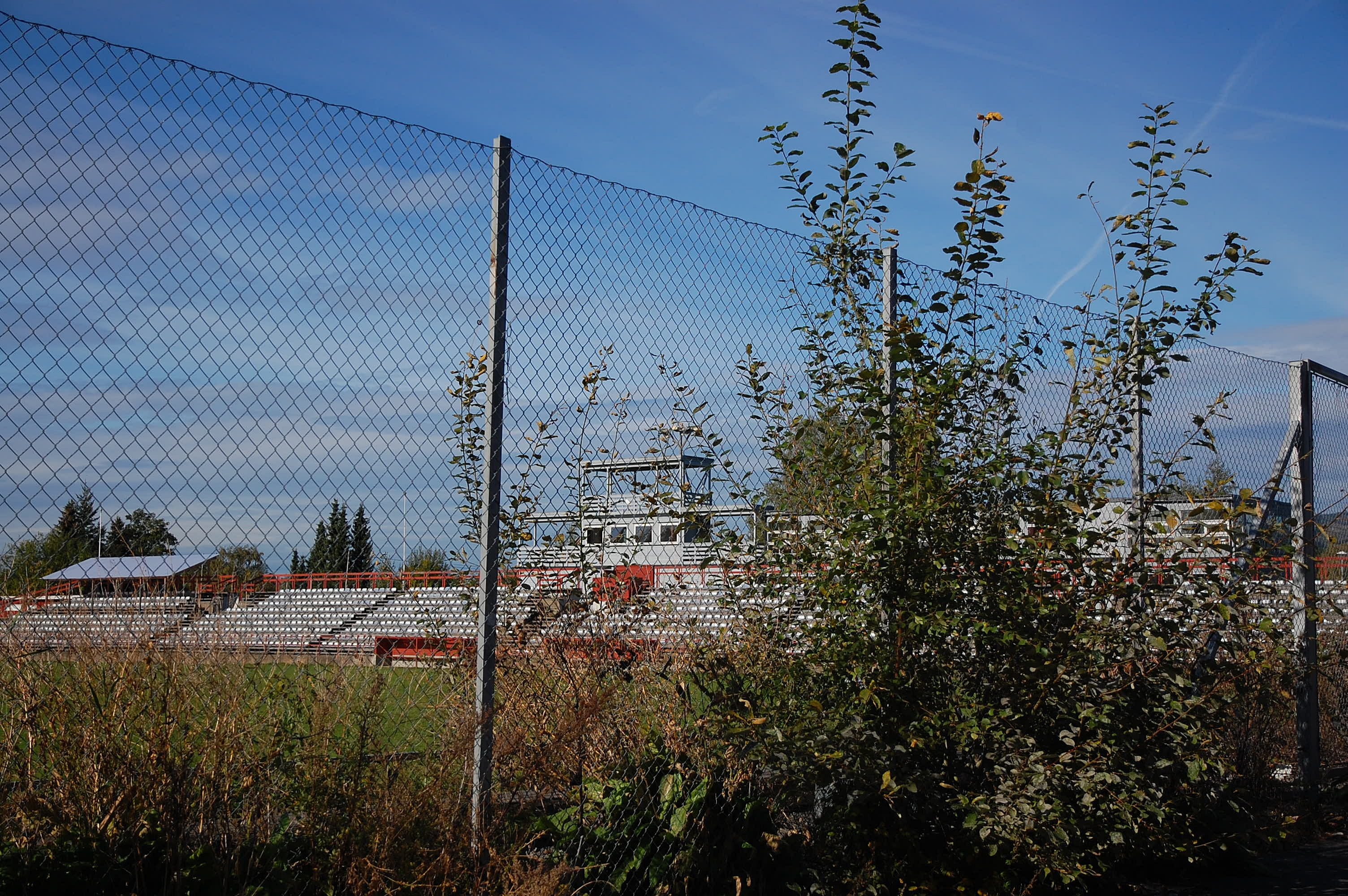
Voldsløkka Stadion

== History ==
It was the home ground of Oslo football team Skeid, and was used for Premier League matches in 1999. However, in 2007 it did not meet the requirements of First Division (second tier of Norwegian football) matches, so Skeid elected to play their home games at Bislett Stadion. Instead in 2007 Voldsløkka Stadion hosted matches of the Vålerenga B team, who resided in the Second Division (third tier). It has later been used by Oslo City FC. It has also been the temporary home ground of the American football team Oslo Vikings. The area was closed as a football stadium in 2007, and Skeid moved to Nordre Åsen.

In 2018 a new facility opened for field hockey and bandy, to be used by Sagene IF. The stadium hosted matches of the 2020 Women's Bandy World Championship. Artificial ice for bandy is prepared when conditions allow, usually between November and March, using an electric ice resurfacer.
