= Estonia women's national bandy team =

Estonia
Women's Bandy World Championship
- Appearances: 3 (first in 2018)

The Estonia women's national bandy team represents Estonia in the winter team sport of bandy. The 2018 Women's Bandy World Championship was their debut at the Women's Bandy World Championship. They finished 7th among the 8 participating nations.

Their most recent competition was the 2022 Women's Bandy World Championship held in Åby, Sweden.

== Tournament record ==
=== World Championship ===
- 2018 – Finished in 7th place
- 2020 – Finished in 7th place
- 2022 – Finished in 7th place
