= Sparbanken Lidköping Arena =

Indoor arena in Lidköping, Sweden

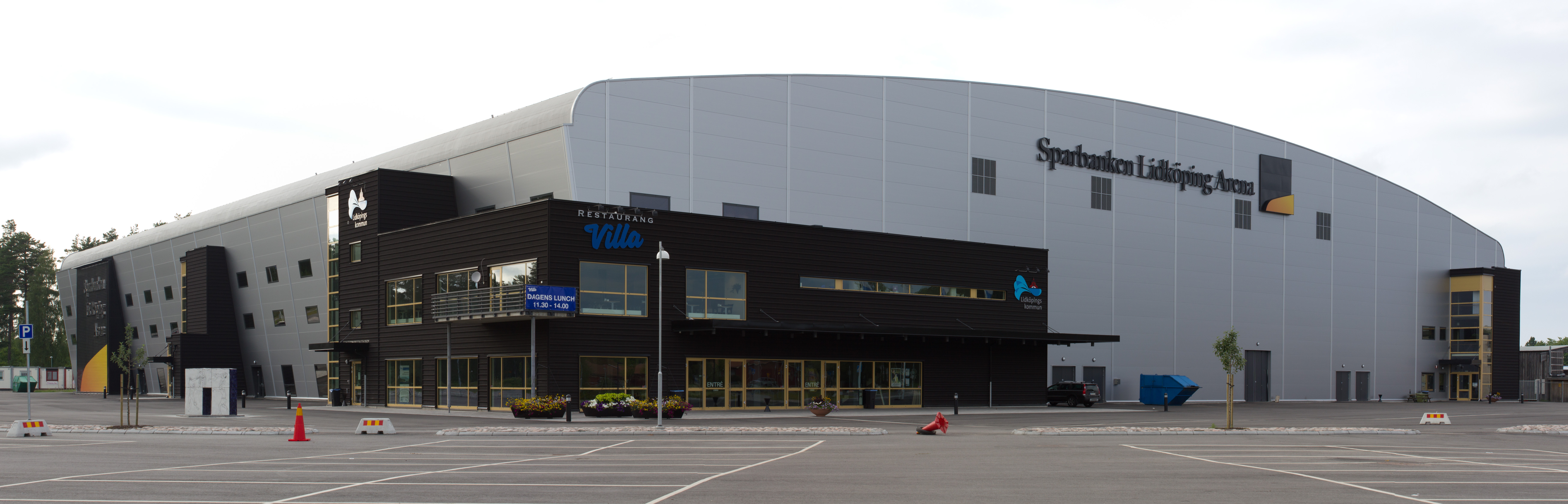
- Interactive map of Sparbanken Lidköping Arena
- Location: Lidköping, Sweden
- Coordinates: 58°29′37″N 13°8′34″E
- Owner: Lidköping Municipality
- Capacity: 4,500 for bandy 12,500 for concerts
- Field size: 65x105 m^{2}

Construction
- Groundbreaking: October 7, 2008
- Opened: December 25, 2009
- Cost: 216.613.589 SEK
- Architects: Bergfjord & Ivarsson

Tenants
- Villa Lidköping BK; Lidköpings AIK; Kållands BK; Gillstad/Svarthall; BK Wiking

Sparbanken Lidköping Arena is an indoor arena in Lidköping, Sweden. It is the home arena for the bandy team, Villa Lidköping BK. The normal capacity of the arena is 4,500 for bandy games and 12,500 for concerts, and the arena was opened on December 25, 2009.

The 2025 Women's Bandy World Championship and Division A of the 2025 Men's Bandy World Championship were played here.

The attendance record for a bandy game is 5,400 on December 2, 2016 when Villa Lidköping BK played vs district rivals IFK Vänersborg.

== See also ==
- List of indoor arenas in Sweden
- List of indoor arenas in Nordic countries
