= Eriksson Arena =

Indoor bandy rink in Växjö Municipality, Sweden

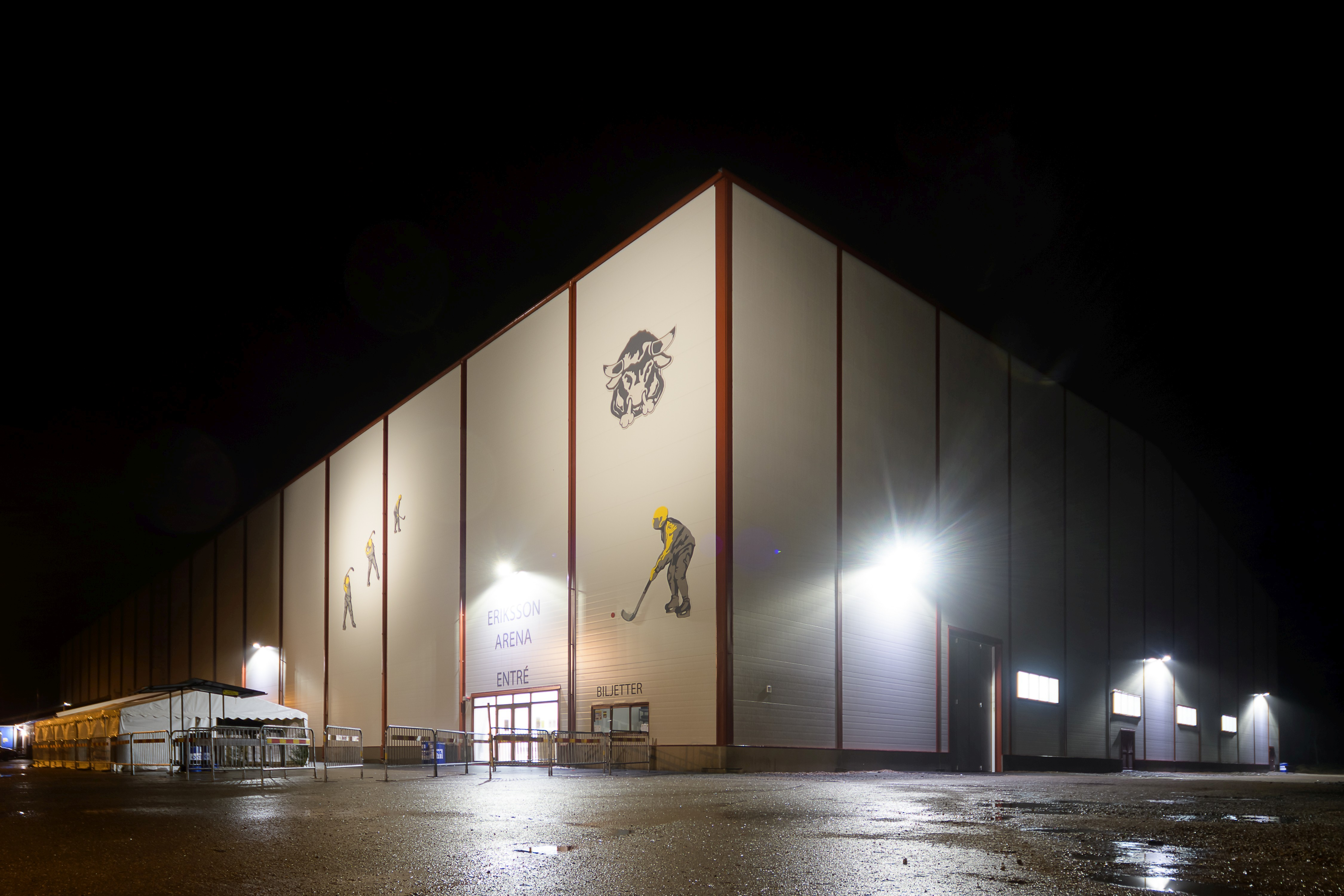
- Eriksson Arena in December 2019
- Interactive map of Eriksson Arena
- Location: Åby, Växjö Municipality, Sweden
- Coordinates: 57°1′12″N 14°46′25″E
- Capacity: 2,000

Construction
- Opened: 13 November 2019

Tenant
- Åby/Tjureda IF

Eriksson Arena is an indoor arena for bandy situated in the forest outside Åby in Växjö Municipality in Sweden. The arena is 9 400 m^{2} (120×78 m), it has an inner ceiling height of 12 m and is isolated. The stands are along the long sides and has a capacity of 1 900 standing and 100 sitting spectators. The arena serves as home ice for Åby/Tjureda IF and had a building cost of 43 MSEK, of which 38,7 MSEK was provided as a loan from Växjö Municipality.

On 13 November 2019, the arena was inaugurated.

The arena was prized as "Arena of the year" ("årets arena") in 2019 by magazine Sport & Affärer.

The 2022 Women's Bandy World Championship was played in the arena and the 2023 Women's Bandy World Championship and the 2023 Men's Bandy World Championship were also played there, both at the same time.
