= Netherlands women's national bandy team =

Netherlands
- Association: Bandy Bond Nederland

Women's Bandy World Championship
- Appearances: 2 (first in 2022)

The Netherlands women's national bandy team represents the Netherlands in the sport of bandy. The team is controlled by the Bandy Bond Nederland.

The Netherlands took part in the first ever tournament for women’s national teams, held in Örebro, Sweden, in 1980. However, their debut in the Women's Bandy World Championship wasn’t made until the 2022 Women's Bandy World Championship. The team finished in 5th place.

== Tournament record ==
=== World Championship ===
- 2022 – Finished in 5th place
- 2023 – Finished in 4th place
- 2025 – Finished in 5th place
