= Mollie Ray Carroll =

American economist

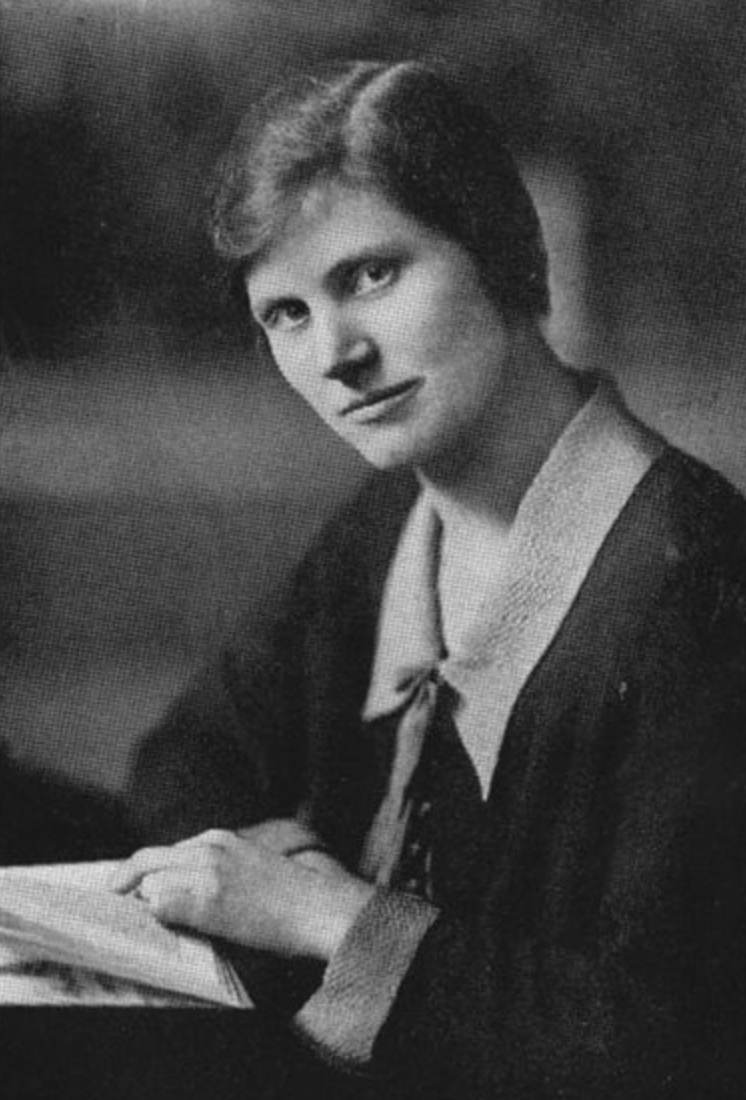
- Carroll in the 1926 yearbook of Goucher College
- Born: January 8, 1890; Des Moines, Iowa
- Died: 1977
- Occupation(s): Economist, college professor, settlement worker

Mollie Ray Carroll (January 8, 1890 – 1977) was an American economist and settlement worker, best known for her book Labor and Politics: The Attitude of the American Federation of Labor Toward Legislation and Politics (1923).

== Early life and education ==
Carroll was born in Des Moines, Iowa and raised in Chicago, the daughter of Alonzo Neighton Carroll and Rachel Pauline Morgan Carroll. She received a bachelor's degree in 1911 and her master's degree in 1915, and completed a PhD in 1920, all at the University of Chicago.

== Career ==
Carroll was general secretary of the university YWCA in Lawrence, Kansas as a young woman. She taught economics at Goucher College in the 1920s, and was an organizer of the Business and Professional Woman's Club in Baltimore. She was active in the League of Women Voters (LWV) at the national level, and represented the LWV at an international suffrage meeting in Berlin in 1929. She received a Guggenheim Fellowship in 1927 to study the system of unemployment insurance in Germany.

In 1930 Carroll became head resident of the University of Chicago Settlement, and taught social service courses at the University of Chicago. In 1931 she addressed the statewide conference of the Iowa Federation Business and Professional Woman's Clubs. She was director of research at the Workers' Education Bureau of the American Federation of Labor in 1937. In 1938, she was described as an industrial economist at the United States Department of Labor.

== Publications ==
=== Books ===
- Labor and politics; the attitude of the American Federation of Labor toward legislation and politics (1923)
- Our Wants and How they are Satisfied (1930)
- Unemployment Insurance in Germany (1930)
- Unemployment Insurance in Austria (1932)
- American workers' education; its meaning, methods, and policies (1936, with Spencer Miller Jr.)

=== Articles ===
- "Some Problems in the Training of Social Workers" (1923)
- "Women and the international labor movement" (1924)
- "Legislation and the Minimum Wage" (1926)
- "Recent Improvements in German Social Statistics" (1928)
- "Two Years of German Unemployment Insurance" (1929)
- "Present-Day Social Insurance in Germany" (1929)
- "Amending the German Unemployment Insurance Act" (1930)
- "Will Germany's Social Services Survive?" (1935)

== Personal life ==
Carroll was engaged to Kentucky clergyman Dilworth R. Lupton in 1917. She died in 1977.
