= Jill Reynolds =

American artist

- Born: 1956 (age 69–70); Chicago, Illinois, U.S.
- Education: Evergreen State College, Rutgers University
- Occupation: glass artist

Jill Reynolds (born 1956) is an American contemporary artist. She is known for her work in glass, often as glass art installations that address trauma.

== Early life ==
Reynolds was born in 1956 in Chicago, Illinois. In 1979, she earned a bachelor's degree in architecture from the Evergreen State College in Olympia, Washington. She received a Master of Fine Arts degree from Rutgers University in 1996.

== Career ==
In 2003, she was an artist-in-residence at the Pittsburgh Glass Center. Her work is included in the collections of the Seattle Art Museum, the New Britain Museum of American Art, the Corning Museum of Glass, and the Tacoma Art Museum.
