= Åby, Växjö Municipality =

Åby
- Location within Kronoberg Location within Sweden
- Coordinates: 57°02′N 14°47′E
- Country: Sweden
- Province: Småland
- County: Kronoberg County
- Municipality: Växjö Municipality

Area
  - Total: 0.73 km^{2} (0.28 sq mi)

Population (31 December 2010)
  - Total: 456
  - Density: 627/km^{2} (1,620/sq mi)
- Time zone: UTC+1 (CET)
  - Summer (DST): UTC+2 (CEST)

Åby is a locality situated in Växjö Municipality, Kronoberg County, Sweden with 456 inhabitants in 2010.

The 2022 Women's Bandy World Championship was held there, in Eriksson Arena, which normally is the home ice of bandy club Åby/Tjureda IF. The 2023 Women's Bandy World Championship and the 2023 Men's Bandy World Championship were held there.
