= Ida Friman =

Swedish bandy player

- Born: 26 December 1999 (age 26) Surte, Sweden
- Position: Forward
- Elitserien team Former teams: Villa Lidköping BK; Surte BK; Kareby IS
- Playing career: 2012–present
Medal record
Representing Sweden
Women's bandy
Universiade
Gold medal – first place	2019 Krasnoyarsk
World Championship
Gold medal – first place	2018 Chengde
Gold medal – first place	2020 Oslo
Gold medal – first place	2022 Växjö
Gold medal – first place	2023 Växjö
Gold medal – first place	2025 Lidköping

Ida Elin Friman (born 26 December 1999) is a Swedish bandy player, currently playing with Villa Lidköping BK in the women's Elitserien. She has played with the Swedish women's national bandy team.

== Playing career ==
Friman is from Surte and her mother club was Surte BK; she played at youth level for Surte/Kareby BK/IS. She joined Villa Lidköping BK in 2018.

== International play ==
Friman made her international debut in January 2017, at age 17, appearing in a pair of training matches against Finland and scoring twice in each match.

She also represented Sweden in the women's bandy tournament at the 2019 Universiade in Krasnoyarsk, Russia. Friman scored a goal in the gold medal match to help Sweden defeat Russia and claim top honours in the tournament.

== Personal life ==
Friman studies civil engineering and architecture at Chalmers University of Technology in Gothenburg; for the 2019–20 school year, she was awarded one of 75 annual scholarships for students who have represented Sweden in international sport. Her father, Jonny Friman, played for Surte BK, and her brother, Gustav, and sister, Moa, also play for Elitserien teams.
