= Penalty shot =

Penalty in several sports whereby a goal is attempted during untimed play

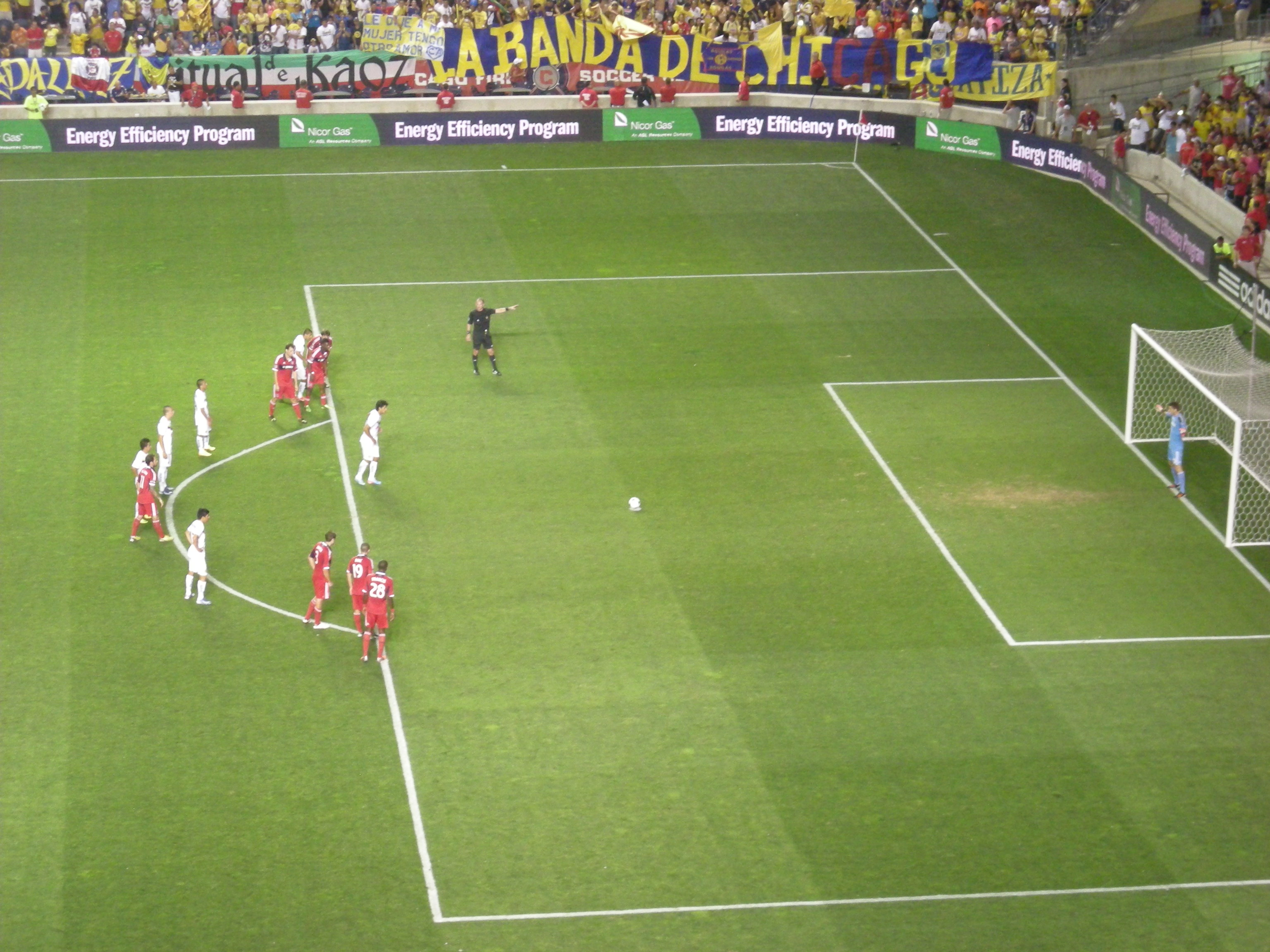
An association football player preparing to take a penalty kick, 2013.

A penalty shot or penalty kick is a play used in several sports whereby a goal is attempted during untimed play. Depending on the sport, when a player commits certain types of penalties, the opposition is awarded a penalty shot or kick attempt. The rules on how a player attempts a penalty shot or kick also varies between sports.

Penalty shots or kicks are sometimes grouped into the larger penalty shootout, which is used as a tiebreaker to decide games in several sports.

== Association football ==
In association football, a penalty kick is awarded to the opponent when a direct free kick foul has been committed by a team within its own penalty area. The shot is taken from the penalty mark, which is 11 m (12 yards) from the goal line and centred between the touch line, while the goal is defended only by the opposing team's goalkeeper. For a penalty to be correctly taken, the ball must be stationary at the penalty mark. All other players must be outside the box, at least ten yards from the ball. The players cannot enter the box until the ball has been touched. The goalkeeper also cannot move off of his line until the ball is kicked. If the match is tied after 90 min of regulation and 30 min of extra time, a penalty shootout is used to determine the winner. In a shootout, penalties are taken from the spot, but no rebounds are allowed.

== Bandy ==
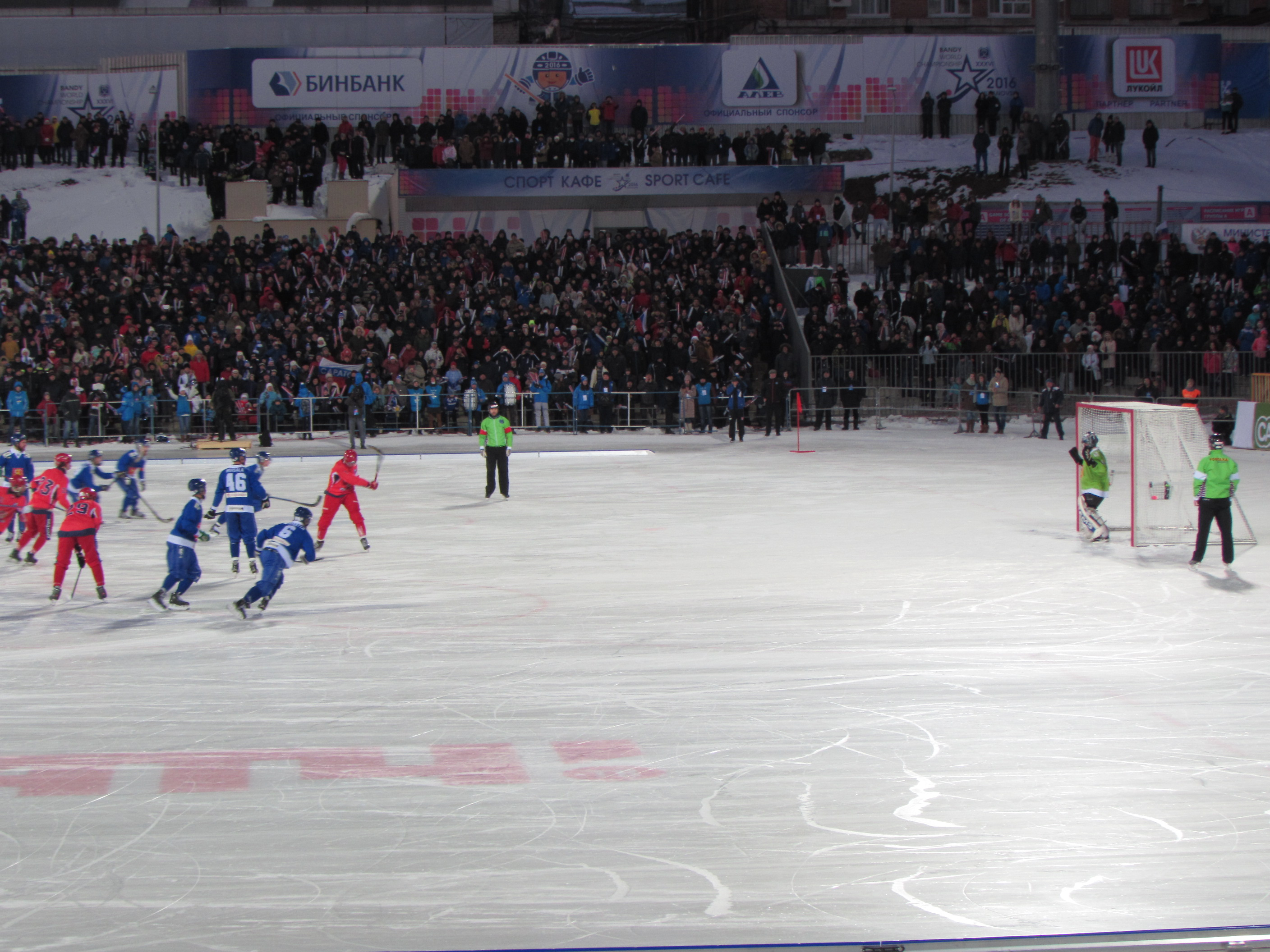
A penalty shot in bandy

A penalty shot is awarded to the fouled team in bandy, following a foul usually punishable by a free-shot but that has occurred within their opponent's penalty area.

The situations when a penalty shot is to be made is stated in Rule 14 of the Bandy Playing Rules published by the Federation of International Bandy. The execution of a penalty shot is regulated in Rule 15.

If a match is at a draw at full time, a penalty shot competition can be arranged in order to determine a winning team, either after an extension of the match which still is at a draw or instead of an extension. This is regulated in Rule 16.

== Gaelic football ==
In Gaelic football, a penalty kick may be awarded if a defender commits a foul within the large rectangle enclosing the goal. The penalty kick is taken from the ground from the centre of the 11 m (12 yards) line. Only the goalkeeper may guard the goals.

== Ice hockey ==
An ice hockey penalty shot

In ice hockey, a penalty shot is awarded to a player in a good shooting position denied a chance at a goal by the foul of an opponent. All players are required to leave the ice rink as the player who got fouled faces off solely against the goaltender of the opposite team. The puck is placed at the center of the ice rink as the player has twenty seconds to retrieve the puck and attempt to score a goal against the goaltender. The penalty shot ends as soon as the puck either crosses the goal line, is blocked by the goaltender, stops moving, moves in the opposite direction of the goal line, or if the shooter loses possession of the puck.

== Polo ==
A penalty shot is awarded. There is an example below: The player who is charged with a brutality is red-carded; that team plays shorthanded for 4 minutes, and is forced to play with one less player than the other team for that duration. In addition to the exclusion, a penalty shot is also awarded to the opposing team, if the foul occurs during actual play.

== Rugby ==
A rugby penalty goal attempt

If a side commits a penalty infringement the opposition can take the option of a place kick at goal from where the infringement occurred. A successful penalty kick is worth two points in rugby league and three points in rugby union.

== Water polo ==
A penalty shot or throw is awarded when a defender commits a major foul within the six meter area that prevents a likely goal.

== Handball ==
A penalty throw is awarded if a defender is defending within the 6 meter penalty area, commits a dangerous foul or commits a foul during a shot. The throw is taken 7 meters from the goal.

== Similar plays ==
In field hockey, a penalty stroke or a penalty corner is awarded after a foul.

Free throws are the equivalent of the penalty shot in basketball; free throws are much more common than penalty shots in other sports, due to the much higher rate of fouling in that game.

Gridiron football does not have any sort of explicit equivalent to the penalty shot; scenarios where an illegal act deprived someone of a score are handled through the unfair act clause, which allows officials the right to assess any penalty they see fit, including awarding the score automatically.
