= Krasnogorsk constituency =

Legislative constituency in Russia

Krasnogorsk single-member constituency
- Constituency of the Russian State Duma
- Deputy: Sergey Kolunov; United Russia
- Federal subject: Moscow Oblast
- Districts: Istra, Klin, Krasnogorsk, Lotoshino, Mozhaysk, Shakhovskaya, Volokolamsk, Voskhod
- Voters: 581,457 (2026)

The Krasnogorsk constituency (No.121 (Note: Istra constituency No.106 in 1993-1995 and 2003-2007, Istra constituency No.105 in 1995-2003, No.120 in 2016–2026)) is a Russian legislative constituency in Moscow Oblast. The constituency covers north-western and outer western Moscow Oblast, including the de-facto oblast capital Krasnogorsk.

The constituency has been represented since 2021 by United Russia deputy Sergey Kolunov, a construction businessman and real estate developer, who won the open seat, succeeding five-term United Russia incumbent Martin Shakkum.

== Boundaries ==
1993–1995 Istra constituency: Istra, Istrinsky District, Krasnogorsk, Krasnogorsky District, Lotoshinsky District, Mozhaysk, Mozhaysky District, Naro-Fominsk, Naro-Fominsky District, Shakhovskoy District, Volokolamsk, Volokolamsky District
The constituency stretched from the Moscow inner north-western suburb Krasnogorsk to outer western Moscow Oblast and then went eastwards to grab Moscow's outer south-western suburbs around Naro-Fominsk, surrounding the neighbouring Odintsovo constituency. It also covered the cities Istra and Mozhaysk.

1995–2007 Istra constituency: Istrinsky District, Khimkinsky District, Krasnogorsky District, Lotoshinsky District, Mozhaysky District, Shakhovskoy District, Volokolamsky District, Voskhod
The constituency was significantly altered following the 1995 redistricting, losing Naro-Fominsky District to Podolsk constituency. This seat instead gained the suburban city Khimki north of Moscow from Mytishchi constituency.

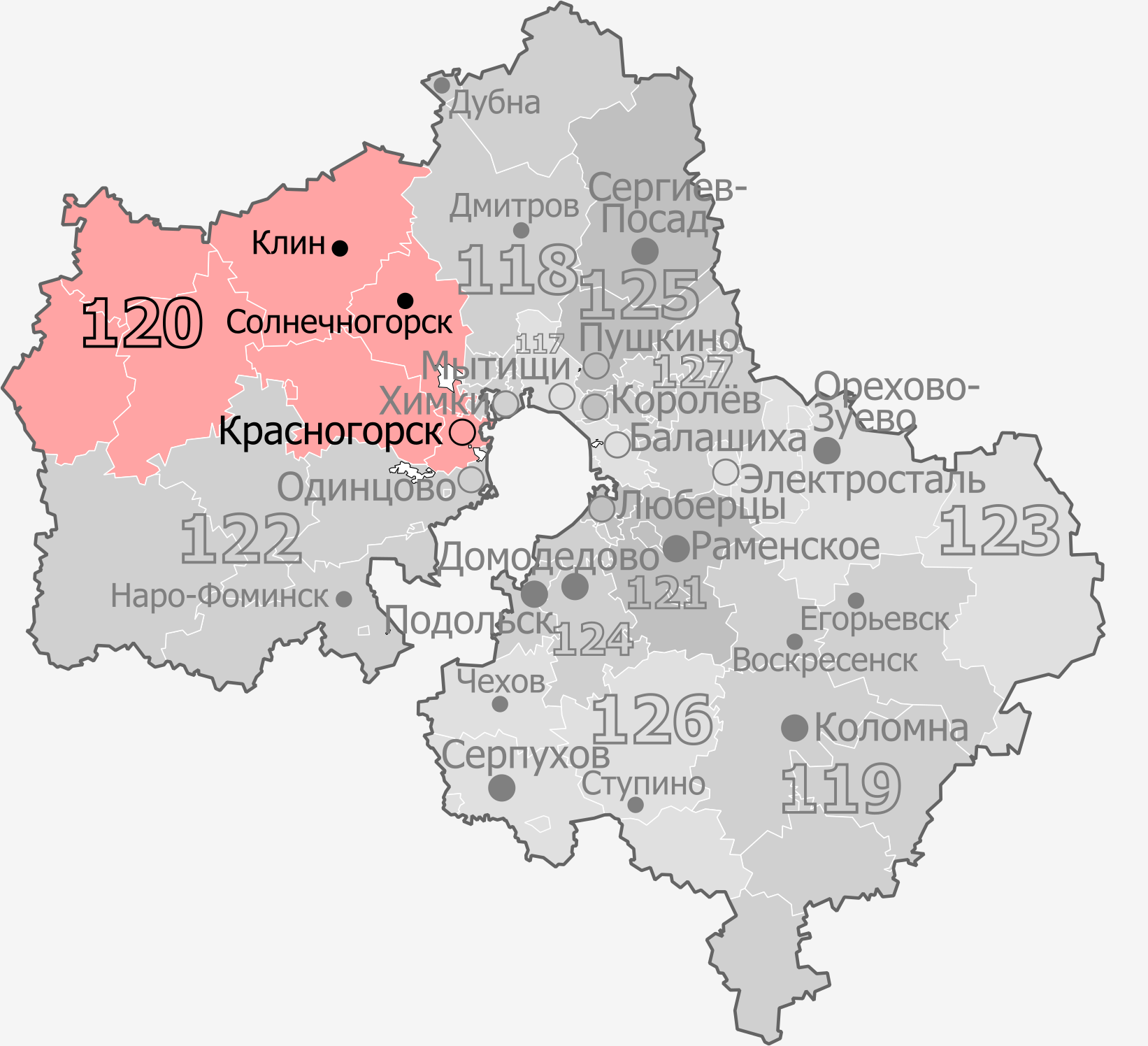
Constituency boundaries from 2016 to 2026

2016–2026: Istra, Klin, Krasnogorsk, Lotoshino, Shakhovskaya, Solnechnogorsky District (Andreyevka, Krivtsovskoye, Kutuzovskoye, Mendeleyevo, Peshkovskoye, Povarovo, Rzhavki, Smirnovskoye, Sokolovskoye, Solnechnogorsk), Volokolamsk, Voskhod
The constituency was re-created for the 2016 election and retained most of its territory, losing Mozhaysk to Odintsovo constituency and Khimki to Dmitrov constituency. This seat instead gained Klin from Dmitrov constituency and most of Solnechnogorsky District from the former Mytishchi constituency.

2026–present: Istra, Klin, Krasnogorsk, Lotoshino, Mozhaysk, Shakhovskaya, Volokolamsk, Voskhod
After the 2025 redistricting the constituency was slightly changed, losing its portion of Solnechnogorsky District to Dmitrov constituency and regaining Mozhaysk in western Moscow Oblast from Odintsovo constituency.

== Members elected ==
Election	Member	Party
1993	Vladimir Gaboyev	Yavlinsky–Boldyrev–Lukin
1995	Dmitry Krasnikov	Communist Party
1999	Martin Shakkum	Fatherland – All Russia
2003	Martin Shakkum	United Russia
2007	Proportional representation - no election by constituency	
2011	Proportional representation - no election by constituency	
2016	Martin Shakkum	United Russia
2021	Sergey Kolunov	United Russia
2026	Sergey Kolunov	United Russia

== Election results ==
=== 1993 ===
Summary of the 12 December 1993 Russian legislative election in the Istra constituency
Candidate	Party	Votes	%
Vladimir Gaboyev	Yavlinsky–Boldyrev–Lukin	57,284	20.61%
Viktor Melnikov	Dignity and Charity	47,837	17.21%
Dmitry Shalyganov	Choice of Russia	45,186	16.26%
Sergey Nigkoyev	Agrarian Party	18,764	6.75%
Vladimir Chiburayev	Kedr	8,009	2.88%
against all		81,085	29.18%
Total		277,890	100%

=== 1995 ===
Summary of the 17 December 1995 Russian legislative election in the Istra constituency
Candidate	Party	Votes	%
Dmitry Krasnikov	Communist Party	58,727	18.63%
Martin Shakkum	My Fatherland	35,328	11.21%
Sergey Kalashnikov	Liberal Democratic Party	28,299	8.98%
Yury Levitsky	Our Home – Russia	27,469	8.71%
Leonid Gozman	Democratic Choice of Russia – United Democrats	16,272	5.16%
Igor Yakovenko	Democratic Alternative	16,186	5.13%
Mikhail Sinelin	Congress of Russian Communities	15,655	4.97%
Natalya Burmistrova	Common Cause	10,567	3.35%
Nikolay Laptev	Duma-96	9,354	2.97%
Valery Bakunin	Party of Economic Freedom	8,454	2.68%
Aleksandr Grebenshchikov	Independent	7,780	2.47%
Valery Kvartalnov	Agrarian Party	7,061	2.24%
Vladimir Gaboyev (incumbent)	Independent	6,169	1.96%
Vladimir Davidenko	Trade Unions and Industrialists – Union of Labour	5,740	1.82%
Aleksandr Lyasko	Independent	4,833	1.53%
Sergey Malinin	Independent	2,502	0.79%
Yury Livin	Union of Patriots	2,406	0.76%
Stanislav Kolonyuk	Party of Russian Unity and Accord	1,719	0.55%
Aleksey Lintsov	Federal Democratic Movement	1,201	0.38%
Mikhail Khoruzhik	Bloc '89	1,048	0.33%
Lev Kononykhin	People's Union	545	0.17%
against all		38,421	12.19%
Total		315,242	100%

=== 1999 ===
Summary of the 19 December 1999 Russian legislative election in the Istra constituency
Candidate	Party	Votes	%
Martin Shakkum	Fatherland – All Russia	101,209	33.26%
Roman Popkovich	Our Home – Russia	30,408	9.99%
Yury Shchekochikhin	Yabloko	30,309	9.96%
Dmitry Krasnikov (incumbent)	Independent	22,772	7.48%
Valery Kvartalnov	Independent	19,955	6.56%
Mikhail Nenashev	Independent	12,585	4.14%
Anatoly Alekseyev	Independent	10,406	3.42%
Marina Mogilevskaya	Independent	6,291	2.07%
Yury Smirnov	Independent	5,689	1.87%
Mikhail Bondarenko	Independent	5,539	1.82%
Sergey Artamonov	Liberal Democratic Party	5,101	1.68%
against all		45,094	14.82%
Total		304,321	100%

=== 2003 ===
Summary of the 7 December 2003 Russian legislative election in the Istra constituency
Candidate	Party	Votes	%
Martin Shakkum (incumbent)	United Russia	101,714	38.84%
Yury Korablin	Independent	48,273	18.43%
Valery Bakunin	Yabloko	19,297	7.37%
Valery Sharnin	Communist Party	15,123	5.77%
Aleksandr Grebenshchikov	Agrarian Party	7,657	2.92%
Tatyana Khakhalina	Independent	5,698	2.18%
Nikolay Neverov	Independent	5,528	2.11%
Boris Pavlov	Party of Russia's Rebirth-Russian Party of Life	4,565	1.74%
Leonid Borisenko	Great Russia – Eurasian Union	1,997	0.76%
against all		45,304	17.30%
Total		262,394	100%

=== 2016 ===
Summary of the 18 September 2016 Russian legislative election in the Krasnogorsk constituency
Candidate	Party	Votes	%
Martin Shakkum	United Russia	77,423	38.38%
Aleksey Russkikh	Communist Party	30,344	15.04%
Vasily Kharpak	Liberal Democratic Party	23,959	11.88%
Igor Zaytsev	Yabloko	12,182	6.04%
Aleksandr Romanovich	A Just Russia	9,490	4.70%
Yelena Grishina	The Greens	9,141	4.53%
Nikolay Mechtanov	Communists of Russia	8,598	4.26%
Yevgeny Ivanov	Rodina	7,946	3.94%
Konstantin Klimenko	Party of Growth	6,545	3.24%
Vadim Kholostov	Patriots of Russia	5,417	2.69%
Total		201,746	100%

=== 2021 ===
Summary of the 17-19 September 2021 Russian legislative election in the Krasnogorsk constituency
Candidate	Party	Votes	%
Sergey Kolunov	United Russia	138,460	48.24%
Gleb Pyanykh	A Just Russia — For Truth	33,762	11.76%
Konstantin Cheremisov	Communist Party	26,641	9.28%
Mikhail Borushkov	Liberal Democratic Party	17,145	5.97%
Vladimir Ryazanov	Communists of Russia	14,612	5.09%
Yevgeny Yelagin	New People	13,473	4.69%
Maria Kozlovskaya	Party of Pensioners	13,062	4.55%
Vera Kozyreva	The Greens	7,048	2.46%
Andrey Aleshkin	Yabloko	5,663	1.97%
Inna Rodina	Rodina	5,553	1.93%
Total		287,038	100%

=== 2026 ===
Summary of the 18-20 September 2026 Russian legislative election in the Krasnogorsk constituency
Candidate	Party	Votes	%
Sergey Kolunov (incumbent)	United Russia	193,686	59.65%
Yegor Borodinov	Communist Party	40,904	12.60%
Yulia Stepanova	Liberal Democratic Party	34,363	10.58%
Nikolay Shcherbak	A Just Russia	19,869	6.12%
Anton Sadilov	Yabloko	12,664	3.90%
Tamara Meshchaninova	Party of Pensioners	11,194	3.45%
Sergey Shakhmatov	The Greens	8,393	2.58%
Total		324,681	100%
