= Krasnaya Gora =

Name of several Russian rural localities

Krasnaya Gora (Russian: Кра́сная Гора́) is the name of several inhabited localities in Russia.

== Arkhangelsk Oblast ==
As of 2010, two rural localities in Arkhangelsk Oblast bear this name:

- Krasnaya Gora, Kotlassky District, Arkhangelsk Oblast, a village in Zabelinsky Selsoviet of Kotlassky District
- Krasnaya Gora, Primorsky District, Arkhangelsk Oblast, a village in Pertominsky Selsoviet of Primorsky District

== Bryansk Oblast ==
As of 2010, two inhabited localities in Bryansk Oblast bear this name:

Urban localities

- Krasnaya Gora, Krasnogorsky District, Bryansk Oblast, a work settlement in Krasnogorsky District

Rural localities

- Krasnaya Gora, Rognedinsky District, Bryansk Oblast, a settlement in Sharovichsky Selsoviet of Rognedinsky District

== Ivanovo Oblast ==
As of 2010, one rural locality in Ivanovo Oblast bears this name:

- Krasnaya Gora, Ivanovo Oblast, a village in Puchezhsky District

== Kursk Oblast ==
As of 2010, one rural locality in Kursk Oblast bears this name:

- Krasnaya Gora, Kursk Oblast, a settlement in Berezovsky Selsoviet of Dmitriyevsky District

== Moscow Oblast ==
As of 2010, two rural localities in Moscow Oblast bear this name:

Urban localities

- Krasnaya Gora, Shatursky District, Moscow Oblast, a settlement under the administrative jurisdiction of the work settlement of Cherusti, Shatursky District

Rural localities

- Krasnaya Gora, Volokolamsky District, Moscow Oblast, a village in Spasskoye Rural Settlement of Volokolamsky District

== Novgorod Oblast ==
As of 2010, three rural localities in Novgorod Oblast bear this name:

- Krasnaya Gora, Borovichsky District, Novgorod Oblast, a village in Peredskoye Settlement of Borovichsky District
- Krasnaya Gora, Lyubytinsky District, Novgorod Oblast, a village under the administrative jurisdiction of the urban-type settlement of Lyubytino, Lyubytinsky District
- Krasnaya Gora, Moshenskoy District, Novgorod Oblast, a village in Dolgovskoye Settlement of Moshenskoy District

== Pskov Oblast ==
As of 2010, one rural locality in Pskov Oblast bears this name:

- Krasnaya Gora, Pskov Oblast, a village in Pechorsky District

== Tver Oblast ==
As of 2010, one rural locality in Tver Oblast bears this name:

- Krasnaya Gora, Tver Oblast, a selo in Kalininsky District

== Tyumen Oblast ==
As of 2010, one rural locality in Tyumen Oblast bears this name:

- Krasnaya Gora, Tyumen Oblast, a village in Dubrovinsky Rural Okrug of Vagaysky District

== Vladimir Oblast ==
As of 2010, one rural locality in Vladimir Oblast bears this name:

- Krasnaya Gora, Vladimir Oblast, a village in Kolchuginsky District

== Vologda Oblast ==
As of 2010, three rural localities in Vologda Oblast bear this name:

- Krasnaya Gora, Babayevsky District, Vologda Oblast, a village in Pyazhozersky Selsoviet of Babayevsky District
- Krasnaya Gora, Kichmengsko-Gorodetsky District, Vologda Oblast, a village in Nizhneyenangsky Selsoviet of Kichmengsko-Gorodetsky District
- Krasnaya Gora, Velikoustyugsky District, Vologda Oblast, a village in Opoksky Selsoviet of Velikoustyugsky District

== Yaroslavl Oblast ==
As of 2010, one rural locality in Yaroslavl Oblast bears this name:

- Krasnaya Gora, Yaroslavl Oblast, a village in Kladovsky Rural Okrug of Poshekhonsky District

== See also ==
- Krasna Hora (disambiguation), a list of settlements with the equivalent Ukrainian-language placename
- Krasna Gora
- Krasnogorsk (disambiguation)
- Krasnogorsky (disambiguation)
