= Krasnogorsky =

Krasnogorsky (masculine), Krasnogorskaya (feminine), or Krasnogorskoye (neuter) may refer to:

- Krasnogorsky District, several districts and city districts in Russia
- Krasnogorsky Urban Settlement (or Krasnogorskoye Urban Settlement), several municipal urban settlements in Russia
- Krasnogorsky (inhabited locality) (Krasnogorskaya, Krasnogorskoye), several inhabited localities in Russia

== See also ==
- Krasnogorsk (disambiguation)
- Krasnaya Gora
- Krasnogorsky Zavod, an optical and photography equipment factory in Moscow Oblast, Russia
