= Leonīds Breikšs =

Latvian poet, journalist, patriot

- Born: 8 April 1908; Yelizarovo, Volokolamsky Uyezd, Moscow Governorate, Russia
- Died: 30 September 1942 (aged 34) (Unconfirmed); Saratov gulag, Russia, Soviet Union
- Education: University of Latvia
- Occupations: Poet, Journalist
- Years active: 1921–1941
- Notable work: "Latvian's creed", "Prayer", "Sacred Legacy"
- Criminal charge: Anti-state activity, Article 58
- Criminal penalty: Hard labour (1941–1942)
- Spouse(s): Anna (née Bildere, b. 1918, Riga) (25 May 1940 – his death)
- Children: 1

Leonīds Breikšs (8 April 1908 – 30 September 1942) was a noted Latvian poet, journalist and nationalist. His Latvian-based country style sits with contemporaries including Aleksandrs Pelēcis, Jānis Medenis, Gunārs Freimanis, Broņislava Martuževa and Anda Līce, who all suffered the terror of Bolsheviks in 1941. He wrote the noted poems "Latvian's creed", "Prayer", and "Sacred Legacy", which became a noted nationalist song with music by Janis Norvilis. Having numerous poetry and political publications in his name in the 1930s, his third and last poetry collection was published after his death in a Soviet gulag in Saratov in September 1942.

== Early life ==
Leonīds Breikšs was born on 8 April 1908, the second of five children born to Pēteris and his wife Amalija. The youngest four children were all born in Russia, as Pēteris then was the steward of Prince Alexei Golytzin's manor in Yelizarovo, then in Ploskovskaya Volost of Volokolamsky Uyezd, part of the Moscow Governorate.

Pēteris and his wife were originally from Vītiņi parish, Latvia, where he had inherited his father Janis's house. Although the children were educated in Russian, at home their parents gave them a Latvian-based upbringing. The family were Lutheran, but the nearest church was in Moscow, some 150 kilometres (93 mi) away. So the family regularly attended the local Russian Orthodox Old-Rite Church, and for each of the three younger children born while in residence on his estate, Prince Golytzin paid for a Lutheran minister to make the journey from Moscow to baptise them.

In summer 1913, during a local peasant uprising, the neighbouring manor was destroyed. After Pēteris had ejected rioters from Prince Golytzin's manor, he sent his family to Moscow for safety. But during this time, those who did not speak the Russian language were considered German, and so Pēteris waved good bye to his family as they departed on a train for Vecpiebalga to live with his relatives, travelling via Koknese. Aged 5, like his father, Breikšs attended the local school, and also fished the local Ogre river. The family often visited his mothers parents in Pakalnieši, who were part of the local Hernhutian movement. From the 18th century onwards, and during the later-half of the 19th century, Piebalga district where the family now lived was home to many early Latvian nationalists, including the former house of linguist Atis Kronvalds and a monument to his acts of patriotism. The family also visited the home of local teacher and writer Matīss Kaudzīte, to whom the children would read Pushkin.

By Autumn 1913, Pēteris Breikšs had found employment as the manager's assistant in a textile factory in Serpuhovo, so the family returned to Russia. They arrived in the middle of a scarlet fever epidemic, in which the eldest sister died. After the outbreak of World War I, Pēteris decided to move back to Moscow to keep his family safe, gaining the position as manager of the French manufacturer Girot's silk factory. On 8 September 1915, youngest sister Tamara Anna was born, who after World War II brought Breikšs' poetry to the attention of the Latvian community in the United States. During the 1917 Russian Revolution, and following the abdication of Tsar Nikolai II, food and fuel were in short supply under the Bolsheviks. Being now close to the post-revolutionary cauldron in Moscow, Pēteris moved the family again to a state-farm (sovkhoz) close to Tula.

Following the end of World War I, the country of Latvia declared independence on 18 November 1918, which started the Latvian War of Independence. After agreement of a truce on 1 February 1920, Russia and Latvia signed a peace treaty on 11 August, formally recognised by the League of Nations on 26 January 1921. After the death of his younger sister (third child), the Breikšs family received a permit to leave Russia on 3 October 1920. Departing Moscow in a lorry convey in December 1920, the family of five leave Russia with only that which they can carry, travelling first to Zilupe and then catching a train to Riga.

== Early writing ==
Having been raised speaking Latvian, and mainly educated in the Russian language, as well as the German language, 12-year-old Leonīds Breikšs found it hard to fully understand the Slavic language letters. Educated privately at the Lutheran Marija Millere grammar school, the family also attended the local Lutheran church, which had an altarpiece titled "Jesus blessing children" by Janis Rozentāls.

Looking to express his isolation of living in his homeland while not being able to speak its language, Breikšs starts to write expressively in Russian aged 13. Moving quickly to Latvian, his early writings are sorrowful expressions for his lost sisters, using the metaphor of lost birds trying to make their way home. Beginning to develop his style, he writes of religious-based principles of the wrongdoings to other people, as well as reflectively about the summer that he spent in Vitini. This also led to his writing of Latvian patriotism, expressed through both the history of Piebalga district and its early heroes. After trusting his mother and reading her some of his poetry, she sought the advice of theology professor Voldemars Maldonis of the University of Latvia.

Aged 13, Breikšs won his first prize for poetry from youth magazine Cirulitis (Little Lark). The following year newspaper Kurzemnieks published his poem "On Christmas eve", published under his pen name of Sirijs. On 13 April 1924, his poem "I want to sing a song once" was published in newspaper Jaunatnes dzive (Life of Youth), later claimed to be his first commissioned publication.

Continuing his studies at Riga State Grammar school No. 1, his fellow students include Arnolds Lūsis, latterly the archbishop of the Latvian Evangelical Lutheran church, who was exiled from 1966. Aleksandrs Dauge, editor of magazine Latvju Jaunatne (Latvian Youth), began to feature his poems. Dauge also acts as a mentor, encouraging Leonids to develop his poetry using the natural wildlife and geography of Latvia to express his poetry. Breikšs returned the compliment by featuring Dauge in his poetry during this period.

After graduating in 1927 from the grammar school, with his father in a secure well-paying position with Latvian Railways, in 1928 having spent the year writing, Breikšs enrolled on a legal course at the University of Latvia. The following year he joined the student fraternity Fraternitas Latviensis, which helps develop his two loves: poetry, through its reading evenings; and politics, in which he starts writing on in published articles by criticising the speeches of the Latvia politicians. On 24 January 1929, along with Alfred Valdmanis and Ilona Leimane, Breikšs joined the Council of the Academic section of the National Union, a right-wing nationalist party with strong antisemitic views, led by Arveds Bergs.

At the time of his confirmation on Whitsunday of 1928 (an experience to which he would return many times in his poetry), his parents had by this time moved to a farm in Lower Kurzeme near Auce, situated next to Lake Kreklini, an extension of Lake Ezerupe. It was from his time on the farm, walking through and picking apples from the orchard, that he wrote the poem "My motherland".

== Writer and journalist ==
Encouraged by Bergs, Breikšs left university having not graduated and was employed on the editorial board of newspaper Latvis. His poetry was encouraged by both his employer and Bergs, a lawyer turned right-wing politician who worked in the press section of the Ministry of Internal Affairs, later shot in December 1941 in Orenburg prison.

In 1931, aged 23, Valters un Rapa publishing house publishes Leonids's first poetry collection Reverberant waters. This is a collection of the best of all of his poetry so far created.

In 1931, Leonīds Breikšs had joined the right-wing and antisemitic political party Perkonkrusts, led by Gustavs Celmiņš. He left the party very publicly in 1933 in an article published in Latvis. After this he became highly critical of the Saeima, writing the article "Their time has arrived!" ("Vinu laiks ir klat!"), published by Universitas magazine just before the President dissolved the Saeima and outlawed Perkonkrusts in May 1934. Both Leoinds and the publisher were unsuccessfully sued by the public prosecutors office, in the political aftermath of the parliaments dissolution. After this he tempered his political articles, but believed in President Karlis Ulmanis, who would later quote Leonids in various speeches.

In 1933, his semi-autobiographic novel Will-o'-the-wisp was published, which covers his student life and early experiences of journalism. He then gathers this short stories together in the publication My dream land, published by Gulbis in 1935, the same year in which his second collection of poems Our family was published, dedicated to his mother. Sections from this collection were read at the dedication ceremony of the Freedom Monument in 1934, which commemorates the Latvian War of Independence.

By 1934 Breikšs was working in the Writing and Books section of the Ministry of Social Affairs, under painter and historian Ernests Brastiņš, founder of the founder of the Dievturi congregation. During this time he wrote the poems "Christ" and "Prayer", in which he asks God for strength and resilience against evil. Still wanting to be a lawyer, but with little time to study to complete his degree, his writing output from his green-inked typewriter increased, covering a vast array of topics but mainly around the areas of culture and religion. In 1936 Leonids served as editor and contributor to the multi-author short story collection Work songs.

== National service ==
From 1937, Leonids served his two years of national service in the Latvian Army. After his basic training he was awarded the rank of corporal, but even while serving he continued to write, publishing over 30 pieces including "Latvian's prayer". Selected for officer training in Riga in 1939, he was joined there by Stanislavs Reinis, who would later fill-in the history of Breikšs time in the army and during the two-year course.

In 1935, Breikšs had met Anna Bildere (b. 1918, Riga). From 1939 their friendship developed, marrying at St. John’s church, Riga on 25 May 1940. After a reception at the Latvian Railways headquarters, they honeymooned along the River Ogre close to Vecpiebalga. They returned to live in an apartment in Riga rented from bibliographer Jānis Misiņš, where within his extensive library the pair began to translate John Steinbeck's novel The Grapes of Wrath into Latvian.

== World War II ==
After the signing of the Molotov–Ribbentrop non-aggression pact on 23 August 1939, the Wehrmacht invasion of Poland began on 1 September 1939. After the Soviet-Japanese ceasefire agreement took effect on 16 September, Stalin ordered his own invasion of Poland on 17 September. This triggered Latvia and the USSR to sign a treaty in Moscow on 6 October 1939, to protect the USSR's south western border. This allowed the Soviets to invade part of south-eastern region of Finland (Karelia and Salla) in the Winter War, which after 105 days were annexed.

After the death in March 1940 Edvarts Virza, in an unstable Latvian political environment that was highly aware of the aggressive powers to both its east and west, Soviet forces began to enforce the secret parts of the Molotov–Ribbentrop Pact on its neighbours, annexing: Estonia; Lithuania; Bessarabia; Northern Bukovina; and the Hertsa region. On the 14/15 June 1940, Red Army unit invaded the Russian/Latvian Masļenki border point, allowing Soviet tank units to invade and occupy Riga on 17 June.

Dismissed by the Soviet occupation forces from his work at the Ministry of Social Affairs, as they formed the Latvian Soviet Socialist Republic (LPSR), Leonids and Anna like many Latvians began a life of hardship between occasional hard but low paying work. They initially worked in the repatriation of Baltic Germans to Germany, but after that worked manually in construction and farming.

Breikšs also continued writing, composing the poem "Latvian's creed" during this period and planning the publication of his third poetry book. But a public profile as a noted nationalist writer and political commentator was not useful at this time, with Cheka informants everywhere, and both the Latvian Police and Soviet secret police making regular night time raids on any perceived antagonists. Leonids was also listed in Unam's Latvian biographic dictionary "I know him", which served as a guide to the Soviet forces as to whom they should interrogate.

=== Arrest ===
After dismissing his mother's suggestion of fleeing Soviet occupation by travelling to Germany, the couple announce to their families at Leonids 33rd birthday party that they are expecting their first child. On 17 April 1941, just after midnight with his parents in residence at the couple's apartment in Riga, Leonids is arrested by a combined force of Cheka and Soviet-controlled State police. Only allowed to say goodbye to his pregnant wife, the State police then took Leonids away, while Cheka guards then ransacked the property and over the following 24 hours kept all occupants in standing positions, and interrogated all visitors.

Over the following months, despite repeated attempts the family fail to confirm if the authorities hold Breikšs, let alone where he is or if he is still alive. In June 1941 the Cheka tell Breikšs' father that he has been arrested and convicted of "Anti-state activity according to article 58". After a number of visits to Riga Central Prison that all proved unfruitful, at midnight on 14 June 1941, the Cheka arrested Breikšs' brother Pēteris.

On 1 July 1941, the Wehrmacht invaded Latvia, entering Riga on the same day. While playing Leonids/Norvilis "Sacred Legacy", the last announcement from the radio presenter was: "Dievs, sveti Latviju" (God bless Latvia). Going to the now open prison, the family did not find Leonids among the 126 ordered shot dead prisoners of the fleeing Soviet forces.

To encourage pro-Nazi Germany feelings among the occupied Baltic states, and increase the locals hatred of the USSR, the German propaganda ministry encouraged the use and publishing of the works of both classical local writers and those missing from the time of the USSR's occupation. This resulted in Anna working with editor Anslavs Eglitis to compile Breikšs' third poetry collection Songs for the earth and the sky with the full support of the occupying Nazi forces, published by Latvju Gramata in 1942. On 15 June 1943, under the watchful eye of the occupying Nazi forces, the Latvian people held a ceremony to commemorate the deported, which included a playing of Leonids/Norvilis "Sacred Legacy".

=== Detention and death ===
From surviving prisoners testimonies, much written and compiled by fellow prisoner Martins Bisters who was himself arrested on 7 January 1941, and did not return to Latvia until 1955; much is known of Leonid's detention but not his exact place or date of death.

Severely physically tortured in the Cheka building in Riga, the interrogation of Breikšs was focused on members of the Latvian national resistance organization, specifically journalists: Edgars Samts, Voldemārs Krastiņš, plus students Leonids Vezis and Atis Ansis Zalitis (all later shot at Astrakhan prison on 28 November 1941). During their investigation, the Cheka also arrested writers Anšlavs Eglītis and Mārtiņš Zīverts on 27 May 1941, in connection with their case against Breikšs. All were eventually convicted based on paragraphs of article 58, which allowed convicts to be both harshly sentenced and deported. Transferred to Riga Central prison in May 1941, where on 11 June he signed a "Protocol on ceasing investigation". On 20 June 1941, Breikšs was convicted based on the 58th paragraph by a Captain of the LPSR.

On 24 June 1941, 3,150 Latvian prisoners including Breikšs were driven in cattle wagons by road to Kryazh station. There, 900 were then shipped by boat down the River Volga to a former horse farm now converted into a gulag at Astrakhan; the rest of the Latvian's were shipped by train further into Siberia. After a long march during which they were stoned by the local population, by late August 1941 Breikšs was resident in the Astrakhan Khan Palace Prison, with his bunk mate Bisters. The two adjacent camps were run on starvation rations and full of disease, including dysentery. Along with the nationalists the Soviet guards shot their fellow Latvian intellectuals: Ernests Brastiņš; Aleksandrs Grīns; Arveds Valtes Avots; Hugo Helmanis; Andrejs Kampe; Kārlis Krauze. By Autumn 1942, only 50 skeleton-like people remained.

In September 1942, Breikšs and Bisters were transferred by rail with Russian prisoners. As the Wehrmacht under Case Blue had broken through towards Stalingrad, many prisoners were moved deeper and further north into Russia, towards the Arctic Circle. Transferred to a prison camp in Saratov, during which Breikšs was suffering from severe stomach pains, Bisters and Breikšs were separated on arrival into a camp that was suffering from a typhoid epidemic. A few weeks later, Bisters was transferred to Krasnoyarsk, where fellow Latvian detainee's said that when ordered to leave their cells in Saratov, Breikšs' body had simply laid strewn on the floor. Later unsupported testimony suggested that Leonids may have been shot at Saratov, but his date and cause of death, plus his resting place remain to this day unknown.

== Post war and legacy ==
After moving within Riga in September 1941, Breikšs' parents and sister departed as post-war refugees to Germany on 8 October 1944.

Anna gave birth to their son Peteris on 24 November 1941, at a private clinic. After living with her parents, on 4 August 1944, she and her son left Riga as refugees on a German Army transport ship bound for Szczecin, Poland, from where they took a train to Vienna, Austria, to reside with a friend. As the Allied and Russian armies advanced on a collapsing Nazi Germany, Anna and her son fled to Bavaria. From there in 1948 she and her son emigrated to Canada, where she initially supported them both by working as a house maid.

Although many writers—particularly those with nationalist sympathies—were suppressed in Latvia during the Soviet Union period, Leonids writings were kept alive by Latvian expatriate communities. During the 1988–1991 Singing Revolution in Latvia, "Sacred Prayer" was revived as a popular nationalist song.

During the 2010 Winter Olympics held in Vancouver, his grandson Chris Breikss's office became the unofficial base for the Latvian Olympic team.

== Sources ==
- Goldman, Stuart D (2012). Nomonhan, 1939: The Red Army's Victory That Shaped World War II. Naval Institute Press. ISBN 978-1-61251-098-9.
- Leonids Breikss (1942). Anslavs Eglitis (ed.). Songs for the earth and the sky. Latvju Gramata.
- Martins Bisters (1998). Collection of L. Breikss' works, Volume I.
- Martins Bisters, Beatrise Cimermane (1998). Biography of L. Breikss.
- Ilgonis Bersons (1998). Collection of L. Breikss' works.
- Romans Pussars (1998). Selection of materials by Rainis' History Museum of Literature and Art.
