= 1973 Bandy World Championship =

8th Bandy World Championship

Tournament details
- Host country: Soviet Union
- Cities: Moscow; Krasnogorsk
- Dates: 17–24 February
- Teams: 4

Final positions
- Champions: Soviet Union (8th title)
- Runners-up: Sweden
- Third place: Finland
- Fourth place: Norway

Tournament statistics
- Games played: 12
- Goals scored: 74 (6.17 per game)

The 1973 Bandy World Championship was the eighth Bandy World Championship and was contested by four men's bandy playing nations. The championship was played in Moscow and Krasnogorsk (Soviet Union) on February 17–24, 1973. The Soviet Union won the championship.

== Qualified nations ==
- Soviet Union
- Finland
- Sweden
- Norway

== Tournament ==
All times are local (UTC+3).

Pos	Team	Pld	W	D	L	GF	GA	GD	Pts
1	Soviet Union (H)	6	6	0	0	32	4	+28	12
2	Sweden	6	4	0	2	21	12	+9	8
3	Finland	6	1	0	5	13	30	−17	2
4	Norway	6	1	0	5	8	28	−20	2

Source: 1973 WCS MEN – RESULTS
(H) Hosts
17 February 1973
15:00

Sweden	5-4	Finland
Bernt Eriksson <90', <90'; - <90', <90', <90'		Seppo Rounaja <90', <90'; - <90', <90'

Zorky, Krasnogorsk
Attendance: ~9,000
Referee: (Norway) T. Hansen, (Norway) I. Pettersen

17 February 1973
-

Soviet Union	11-0	Norway
Valery Bochkov 5', 71', 90'; Vladimir Plavunov 11'; Georgy Kanareykin 15', 28', 78'; Anatoly Frolov 33', 58'; Vladimir Yanko 62'; Nikolai Durakov 75'

Dynamo, Moscow
Attendance: ~8,500
Referee: (Sweden) O. Bennermo, (Sweden) B. Nilsson

18 February 1973
-

Soviet Union	8-3	Finland
Georgy Kanareykin 9'; Valery Bochkov 13'; Vladimir Yanko 19'; Anatoly Frolov 46', 47', 52', 73', 75'		Seppo Rounaja 35'; Veikko Niemikorpi 67'; Esko Holopainen 69'

Dynamo, Moscow
Attendance: ~10,100
Referee: (Norway) I. Pettersen, (Norway) T. Hansen

18 February 1973
17:00

Norway	1-3	Sweden
No Match Data		No Match Data

Zorky, Krasnogorsk
Attendance: ~11,000
Referee: (Soviet Union) Bocharov, (Soviet Union) Revzin

20 February 1973
-

Soviet Union	5-1	Sweden
Anatoly Frolov 13', 17', 89'; Yevgeny Gerasimov 16'; Valery Bochkov 59'		Håkan Olsson 27'

Dynamo, Moscow
Attendance: ~15,000
Referee: (Finland) R. Koskinen, (Finland) K. Ruutu

20 February 1973
17:00

Finland	3-2	Norway
No Match Data		No Match Data

Zorky, Krasnogorsk
Attendance: ~1,500
Referee: (Sweden) B. Nilsson, (Sweden) O. Bennermo, (Soviet Union) Bocharov

21 February 1973
17:00

Soviet Union	4-0	Norway
Yuri Lizavin 18'; Yevgeny Gerasimov 51'; Anatoly Frolov 59', 71'

Zorky, Krasnogorsk
Attendance: ~11,000
Referee: (Sweden) O. Bennermo, (Sweden) B. Nilsson

21 February 1973
19:00

Finland	0-8	Sweden
No Match Data		No Match Data

Dynamo, Moscow
Attendance: ~4,000
Referee: (Soviet Union) Bocharov, (Soviet Union) Revzin

23 February 1973
-

Soviet Union	3-0	Finland
Valery Maslov 27'; Yevgeny Gerasimov 63'; Nikolai Durakov 65'

Dynamo, Moscow
Attendance: ~1,500
Referee: (Norway) I. Pettersen, (Norway) T. Hansen

23 February 1973
-

Sweden	4-1	Norway
- >45', >45', >45', >45'		- <45'

Zorky, Krasnogorsk
Attendance: ~1,000
Referee: -

24 February 1973
-

Soviet Union	1-0	Sweden
Valery Maslov 50'

Dynamo, Moscow
Attendance: ~14,000
Referee: (Finland) R. Koskinen, (Finland) K. Ruutu

24 February 1973
-

Norway	4-3	Finland
- >45', >45', >45', >45'		- <45', <45', <45'

Zorky, Krasnogorsk
Attendance: ~1,000
Referee: (Soviet Union) Bocharov, (Soviet Union) Revzin

=== Final ranking ===
Rank	Team
1st place, gold medalist(s)	Soviet Union
2nd place, silver medalist(s)	Sweden
3rd place, bronze medalist(s)	Finland
4	Norway

=== Top Scorer ===
Scoring Leaders

- 12 Goals: (Soviet Union) Anatoly Frolov

=== Awards ===
Best players selected by the directorate:

- Best Goaltender: (Soviet Union) Leonid Mukhametzianov
- Best Defenceman: (Sweden) Örjan Modin
- Best Midfielder: (Soviet Union) Vladimir Plavunov
- Best Forward: (Soviet Union) Valery Maslov
