= 1975 Bandy World Championship =

9th Bandy World Championship

Tournament details
- Host country: Finland
- Dates: 25 January – 2 February
- Teams: 4

Final positions
- Champions: Soviet Union (9th title)
- Runners-up: Sweden
- Third place: Finland
- Fourth place: Norway

Tournament statistics
- Games played: 12
- Goals scored: 94 (7.83 per game)

The 1975 Bandy World Championship was the ninth Bandy World Championship and was contested by four men's bandy playing nations. The championship was played in Finland from 25 January-2 February 1975. The Soviet Union became champions.

== Qualified nations ==
- Soviet Union
- Finland
- Sweden
- Norway

== Tournament ==
All times are local (UTC+2).

Pos	Team	Pld	W	D	L	GF	GA	GD	Pts
1	Soviet Union	6	5	0	1	47	11	+36	10
2	Sweden	6	5	0	1	28	14	+14	10
3	Finland (H)	6	1	1	4	13	29	−16	3
4	Norway	6	0	1	5	6	40	−34	1

Source: 1975 WCS MEN – RESULTS
(H) Hosts
25 January 1975
-

Sweden	3-1	Soviet Union
Bernt Eriksson 8'; Lars Liv 28'; Håkan Olsson 66'		Yevgeny Gerasimov 56'

Pohja, Tornio
Attendance: 4,777
Referee: (Norway) F. Johansen, (Norway) F. Jakobsen

25 January 1975
-

Finland	2-1	Norway
No Match Data		No Match Data

Raksila, Oulu
Attendance: 1,830
Referee: (Sweden) A. Axelsson, (Sweden) S. E. Bergstrand

26 January 1975
13:00

Finland	2-3	Sweden
No Match Data		No Match Data

Veitsiluoto, Kemi
Attendance: 3,879
Referee: (Soviet Union) Bocharov, (Soviet Union) Ilyin

26 January 1975
13:00

Soviet Union	8-0	Norway
Valery Maslov 17', 50'; Leonid Lobachev 24'; Georgy Kanareykin 34'; Valery Bochkov 35'; Valery Eikhvald 72', 73', 81'

Raksila, Oulu
Attendance: 625
Referee: (Finland) P. Veromaa, (Finland) T. Enckell

28 January 1975
18:30

Sweden	6-0	Norway
No Match Data		No Match Data

Kämäri, Varkaus
Attendance: 945
Referee: (Soviet Union) Bocharov, (Soviet Union) Ilyin

28 January 1975
-

Soviet Union	12-4	Finland
Yevgeny Gorbachev 7'; Leonid Lobachev 8'; Valery Maslov 23', 38'; Valery Bochkov 46', 70'; Georgy Kanareykin 50'; Valery Eikhvald 52'; Vyacheslav Solovyov 56'; Yuri Lizavin 80', 88'; Vladimir Tarasevich 82'		Raimo Okkonen 33'; Veikko Niemikorpi 37'; Eero Hautala 48'; Pauli Auvinen 63'

Hänninhauta, Mikkeli
Attendance: 1,657
Referee: (Sweden) A. Axelsson, (Sweden) S. E. Bergstrand

29 January 1975
-

Soviet Union	7-2	Sweden
Vyacheslav Solovyov 2'; Valery Bochkov 8', 85'; Valery Maslov 38'; Yuri Lizavin 50', 71', 75'		Bernt Eriksson 40', 42'

Hänninhauta, Mikkeli
Attendance: 1,606
Referee: (Finland) P. Veromaa, (Finland) T. Enckell

30 January 1975
-

Finland	2-2	Norway
No Match Data		No Match Data

Kisapuisto, Lappeenranta
Attendance: 826
Referee: -

1 February 1975
13:00

Finland	3-6	Sweden
No Match Data		No Match Data

Hänninhauta, Mikkeli
Attendance: 822
Referee: (Norway) F. Johansen, (Norway) F. Jakobsen

1 February 1975
-

Soviet Union	14-2	Norway
Valery Maslov 1', 16'; Valery Bochkov 18', 28', 60', 73', 79'; Georgy Kanareykin 19', 47', 67', 89'; Yuri Lizavin 39'; Vladimir Plavunov 69'; Yevgeny Gerasimov 76'		Arve Johnsen 30'; Stein Arnesen 64'

Karhumäki, Imatra
Attendance: 271
Referee: (Sweden) A. Axelsson, (Sweden) S. E. Bergstrand

2 February 1975
13:00

Sweden	8-1	Norway
No Match Data		No Match Data

Soukasta, Espoo
Attendance: 587
Referee: (Finland) P. Veromaa, (Finland) T. Enckell

2 February 1975
-

Soviet Union	5-0	Finland
Valery Bochkov 42', 75'; Georgy Kanareykin 56'; Vladimir Plavunov 65'; Valery Eikhvald 74'

Hänninhauta, Mikkeli
Attendance: 502
Referee: (Norway) F. Johansen, (Norway) F. Jakobsen

=== Final ranking ===
Rank	Team
1st place, gold medalist(s)	Soviet Union
2nd place, silver medalist(s)	Sweden
3rd place, bronze medalist(s)	Finland
4	Norway

=== Top Scorer ===
Scoring Leaders

- 12 Goals: (Soviet Union) Valery Bochkov

=== Awards ===
Best players selected by the directorate:

- Best Goaltender: (Sweden) Tommy Axelsson
- Best Defenceman: (Sweden) Håkan Sundin
- Best Forward: (Soviet Union) Valery Bochkov
