= Krasna Hora (disambiguation) =

Krasna Hora is a town in eastern Ukraine. Krasna Hora may also refer to:

- Krásná Hora, a settlement in the Czech Republic
- Krásná Hora nad Vltavou, a settlement in the Czech Republic

== See also ==
- Krasnaya Gora, a list of settlements with the equivalent Russian-language placename
- Krasna Góra, a village in Poland
