= Krasnogorsky (inhabited locality) =

Krasnogorsky (Russian: Красного́рский; masculine), Krasnogorskaya (Красного́рская; feminine), or Krasnogorskoye (Красного́рское; neuter) is the name of several inhabited localities in Russia.

Urban localities

- Krasnogorsky, Chelyabinsk Oblast, a work settlement in Yemanzhelinsky District of Chelyabinsk Oblast
- Krasnogorsky, Mari El Republic, an urban-type settlement in Zvenigovsky District of the Mari El Republic

Rural localities

- Krasnogorsky, Republic of Bashkortostan, a khutor in Araslanovsky Selsoviet of Meleuzovsky District of the Republic of Bashkortostan
- Krasnogorsky, Ivanovo Oblast, a selo in Kineshemsky District of Ivanovo Oblast
- Krasnogorsky, Kemerovo Oblast, a settlement under the administrative jurisdiction of the town of Polysayevo, Kemerovo Oblast
- Krasnogorsky, Krasnoyarsk Krai, a settlement in Stepnovsky Selsoviet of Nazarovsky District of Krasnoyarsk Krai
- Krasnogorsky, Novosibirsk Oblast, a settlement in Moshkovsky District of Novosibirsk Oblast
- Krasnogorsky, Orenburg Oblast, a settlement in Krasnogorsky Selsoviet of Asekeyevsky District of Orenburg Oblast
- Krasnogorsky, Volgograd Oblast, a khutor in Amovsky Selsoviet of Novoanninsky District of Volgograd Oblast
- Krasnogorsky, Yaroslavl Oblast, a settlement in Troitsky Rural Okrug of Pereslavsky District of Yaroslavl Oblast
- Krasnogorskoye, Altai Krai, a selo in Krasnogorsky Selsoviet of Krasnogorsky District of Altai Krai
- Krasnogorskoye, Tyumen Oblast, a selo in Isetsky District of Tyumen Oblast
- Krasnogorskoye, Udmurt Republic, a selo in Krasnogorsky Selsoviet of Krasnogorsky District of the Udmurt Republic
- Krasnogorskaya, Karachay-Cherkess Republic, a stanitsa in Ust-Dzhegutinsky District of the Karachay-Cherkess Republic
- Krasnogorskaya, Kirov Oblast, a village in Yubileyny Rural Okrug of Kotelnichsky District of Kirov Oblast
- Krasnogorskaya, Oryol Oblast, a village in Trosnyansky Selsoviet of Trosnyansky District of Oryol Oblast
