= Dmitrov constituency =

Legislative constituency in Russia

Dmitrov single-member constituency
- Constituency of the Russian State Duma
- Deputy: Denis Kravchenko; United Russia
- Federal subject: Moscow Oblast
- Districts: Dmitrov, Khimki, Lobnya, Solnechnogorsk
- Voters: 532,706 (2026)

The Dmitrov constituency (No.119 (Note: No.105 in 1993-1995 and 2003-2007, No.104 in 1995-2003, No.118 in 2016–2026)) is a Russian legislative constituency in Moscow Oblast. The constituency stretches from inner northern Moscow suburbs of Khimki and Lobnya to northern Moscow Oblast.

The constituency has been represented since 2026 by United Russia deputy Denis Kravchenko, three-term State Duma member and former United Rocket and Space Corporation first deputy director general, who won the open seat after four-term United Russia incumbent Irina Rodnina successfully sought re-election on the party list.

== Boundaries ==
1993–2007: Dmitrovsky District, Dubna, Klinsky District, Sergiyevo-Posadsky District, Taldomsky District
The constituency covered outer Moscow suburbs and exurbs in northern Moscow Oblast, including the cities Dmitrov, Klin, Sergiyev Posad and naukograd Dubna.

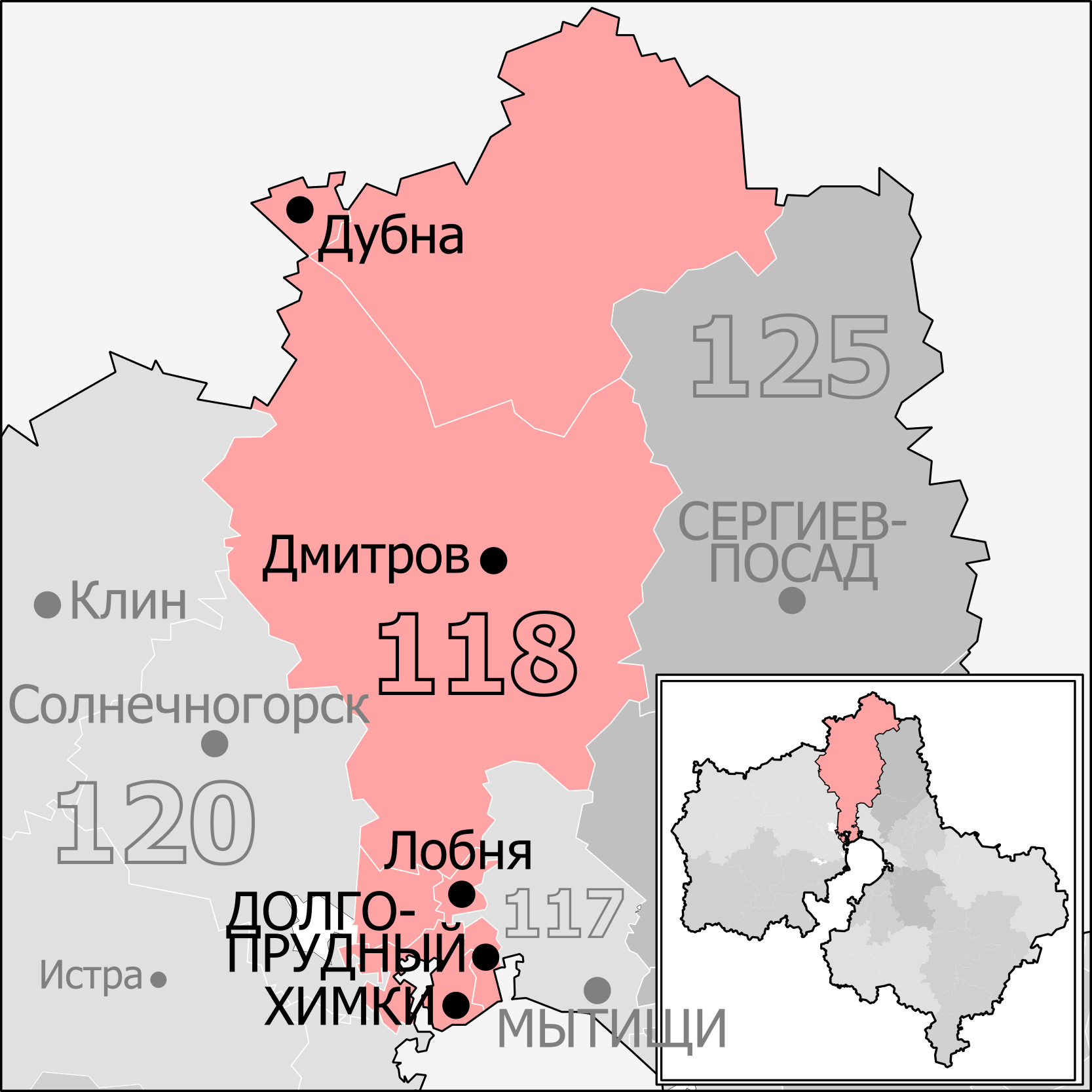
Constituency boundaries from 2016 to 2026

2016–2026: Dmitrov, Dolgoprudny, Dubna, Khimki, Lobnya, Solnechnogorsky District (Lunyovskoye), Taldom
The constituency was re-created for the 2016 election and retained only Dmitrov, Dubna and Taldom, losing Klin to Krasnogorsk constituency and Sergiyev Posad to Sergiyev Posad constituency. This seat instead was pushed southwards to inner Moscow suburbs of Dolgoprudny, Khimki and Lobnya, gained from the former Istra and Mytishchi constituencies.

2026–present: Dmitrov, Khimki, Lobnya, Solnechnogorsk
After the 2025 redistricting the constituency was significantly changed, losing Dolgoprudny to reinstated Mytishchi constituency as well as Dubna and Taldom in its north to Sergiyev Posad constituency. This seat instead gained all of Solnechnogorsk to its west from Krasnogorsk constituency.

== Members elected ==
Election	Member	Party
1993	Artur Muravyov	Independent
1995	Mikhail Men	Yabloko
1999	Valery Galchenko	Fatherland – All Russia
2003	Valery Galchenko	People's Party
2007	Proportional representation - no election by constituency	
2011	Proportional representation - no election by constituency	
2016	Irina Rodnina	United Russia
2021	Irina Rodnina	United Russia
2026	Denis Kravchenko	United Russia

== Election results ==
=== 1993 ===
Summary of the 12 December 1993 Russian legislative election in the Dmitrov constituency
Candidate	Party	Votes	%
Artur Muravyov	Independent	54,326	16.97%
Valery Galchenko	Independent	34,200	10.68%
Aleksey Klimenko	Independent	32,056	10.01%
Vladimir Klimenko	Party of Russian Unity and Accord	25,581	7.99%
Yury Aleksakhin	Choice of Russia	20,090	6.27%
Lidia Gorbatova	Yavlinsky–Boldyrev–Lukin	19,833	6.19%
Vladimir Pchyolkin	Liberal Democratic Party	16,533	5.16%
Sergey Belekhov	Independent	10,701	3.34%
Vitaly Perov	Agrarian Party	9,688	3.03%
Igor Sobolev	Independent	6,836	2.14%
Aleksey Krasnikov	Independent	5,349	1.67%
Aleksandr Shirokov	Independent	4,904	1.53%
Vladimir Kozharov	Democratic Party	4,684	1.46%
Vladimir Svirsky	Independent	3,890	1.21%
against all		49,185	15.36%
Total		320,177	100%

=== 1995 ===
Summary of the 17 December 1995 Russian legislative election in the Dmitrov constituency
Candidate	Party	Votes	%
Mikhail Men	Yabloko	59,194	17.77%
Artur Muravyov (incumbent)	Ivan Rybkin Bloc	50,822	15.25%
Nikolay Solodnikov	Independent	41,300	12.40%
Vladimir Frolov	Communist Party	24,668	7.40%
Nikolay Pavlov	National Republican Party	17,601	5.28%
Yury Samsonov	Independent	15,477	4.65%
Aleksey Prigarin	Communists and Working Russia - for the Soviet Union	11,080	3.33%
Ivan Shkolnik	Agrarian Party	9,320	2.80%
Yevgeny Mysyagin	Congress of Russian Communities	9,264	2.78%
Yevgeny Nikiforov	Independent	8,633	2.59%
Yevgeny Fyodorov	Party of Economic Freedom	8,475	2.54%
Boris Mironov	Independent	8,465	2.54%
Aleksey Zuyev	Liberal Democratic Party	7,079	2.12%
Aleksey Kretov	Party of Workers' Self-Government	5,440	1.63%
Pavel Sokolov	Independent	4,602	1.38%
Vladimir Alferov	Federal Democratic Movement	3,115	0.93%
Valery Artemyev	Derzhava	2,683	0.81%
Oleg Dalkarov	Tikhonov-Tupolev-Tikhonov	1,403	0.42%
Anatoly Sliva	Party of Russian Unity and Accord	1,294	0.39%
Vera Ryabokon	Zemsky Sobor	743	0.22%
against all		33,784	10.14%
Total		333,157	100%

=== 1999 ===
Summary of the 19 December 1999 Russian legislative election in the Dmitrov constituency
Candidate	Party	Votes	%
Valery Galchenko	Fatherland – All Russia	74,238	23.38%
Aleksandr Korovnikov	Independent	58,105	18.30%
Aleksey Ivanenko	Independent	26,346	8.30%
Sergey Kryzhov	Yabloko	20,120	6.34%
Sergey Bedov	Independent	15,917	5.01%
Yevgeny Fyodorov	Our Home – Russia	14,509	4.57%
Yelena Vyalbe	The Greens	11,809	3.72%
Lev Ponomaryov	Union of Right Forces	10,532	3.32%
Gennady Yevdokimov	Independent	4,893	1.54%
Vladimir Mukusev	Social-Democrats	2,615	0.82%
Vladimir Suntsov	Independent	2,233	0.70%
Dmitry Shmelkov	Congress of Russian Communities-Yury Boldyrev Movement	2,158	0.68%
Igor Malkov	Independent	2,078	0.65%
Aleksey Shornikov	Independent	1,776	0.56%
Sergey Yermoshkin	Spiritual Heritage	1,156	0.36%
Aleksey Lysanov	Independent	498	0.16%
against all		60,025	18.90%
Total		317,586	100%

=== 2003 ===
Summary of the 7 December 2003 Russian legislative election in the Dmitrov constituency
Candidate	Party	Votes	%
Valery Galchenko (incumbent)	People's Party	142,518	49.88%
Aleksandr Romanovich	Party of Russia's Rebirth-Russian Party of Life	28,832	10.09%
Sergey Mukhin	Communist Party	15,628	5.47%
Nikolay Salomatin	Union of Right Forces	12,249	4.29%
Galina Kulagina	United Russian Party Rus'	9,931	3.48%
Yevgeny Fyodorov	Independent	6,975	2.44%
Vladimir Kaverin	Agrarian Party	6,700	2.35%
Mikhail Kaganovich	Independent	1,946	0.68%
against all		54,325	19.01%
Total		286,386	100%

=== 2016 ===
Summary of the 18 September 2016 Russian legislative election in the Dmitrov constituency
Candidate	Party	Votes	%
Irina Rodnina	United Russia	89,139	45.25%
Mikhail Avdeyev	Communist Party	22,980	11.66%
Viktoria Dmitriyeva	Liberal Democratic Party	17,280	8.77%
Vyacheslav Belousov	A Just Russia	13,585	6.90%
Mikhail Zernov	Independent	12,673	6.43%
Boris Nadezhdin	Party of Growth	10,744	5.45%
Dmitry Trunin	Yabloko	8,901	4.52%
Vladimir Ryazanov	Communists of Russia	6,972	3.54%
Stanislav Bychinsky	Patriots of Russia	3,942	2.00%
Yury Vzyatyshev	The Greens	2,915	1.48%
Total		197,011	100%

=== 2021 ===
Summary of the 17-19 September 2021 Russian legislative election in the Dmitrov constituency
Candidate	Party	Votes	%
Irina Rodnina (incumbent)	United Russia	96,505	40.89%
Boris Nadezhdin	A Just Russia — For Truth	40,421	17.12%
Aleksandr Kornev	Communist Party	29,110	12.33%
Andrey Litvinov	Communists of Russia	12,005	5.09%
Pavel Kolosok	New People	11,879	5.03%
Aleksey Sokov	Liberal Democratic Party	9,390	3.98%
Daniil Ovsyannikov	Party of Pensioners	9,082	3.85%
Yaroslav Nekrasov	Yabloko	5,057	2.14%
Larisa Kosyuk	The Greens	4,692	1.99%
Gennady Bichev	Russian Party of Freedom and Justice	4,167	1.77%
Semyon Ulanovsky	Rodina	3,016	1.28%
Total		236,038	100%

=== 2026 ===
Summary of the 18-20 September 2026 Russian legislative election in the Dmitrov constituency
Candidate	Party	Votes	%
Denis Kravchenko	United Russia	127,818	47.89%
Aleksandr Romanov	Communist Party	35,174	13.18%
Natalya Potseluyeva	New People	29,780	11.16%
Daniil Zhabin	Liberal Democratic Party	25,490	9.55%
Olga Andreyeva	A Just Russia	22,564	8.45%
Vladislav Chuvakov	The Greens	10,213	3.83%
Pavel Khoba	Party of Pensioners	8,721	3.27%
Total		266,880	100%
