= Krasnogorsky Urban Settlement =

Krasnogorsky Urban Settlement or Krasnogorskoye Urban Settlement is the name of several municipal formations in Russia.

- Krasnogorsky Urban Settlement, a municipal formation which the Urban-Type Settlement of Krasnogorsky in Zvenigovsky District of the Mari El Republic is incorporated as
- Krasnogorskoye Urban Settlement, a municipal formation corresponding to Krasnogorsky Settlement Administrative Okrug, an administrative division of Krasnogorsky District of Bryansk Oblast
- Krasnogorskoye Urban Settlement, a municipal formation which the Work Settlement of Krasnogorsky in Yemanzhelinsky District of Chelyabinsk Oblast is incorporated as

== See also ==
- Krasnogorsky (disambiguation)
- Krasnogorsk, Moscow Oblast, a city in Krasnogorsky District of Moscow Oblast, municipally incorporated as Krasnogorsk Urban Settlement
