= Lotoshino =

Urban locality in Lotoshinsky District, Moscow Oblast, Russia

Coordinates: 56°13′48″N 35°38′12″E

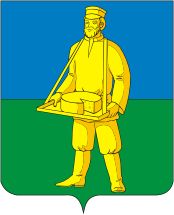
Coat of arms of Lotoshino

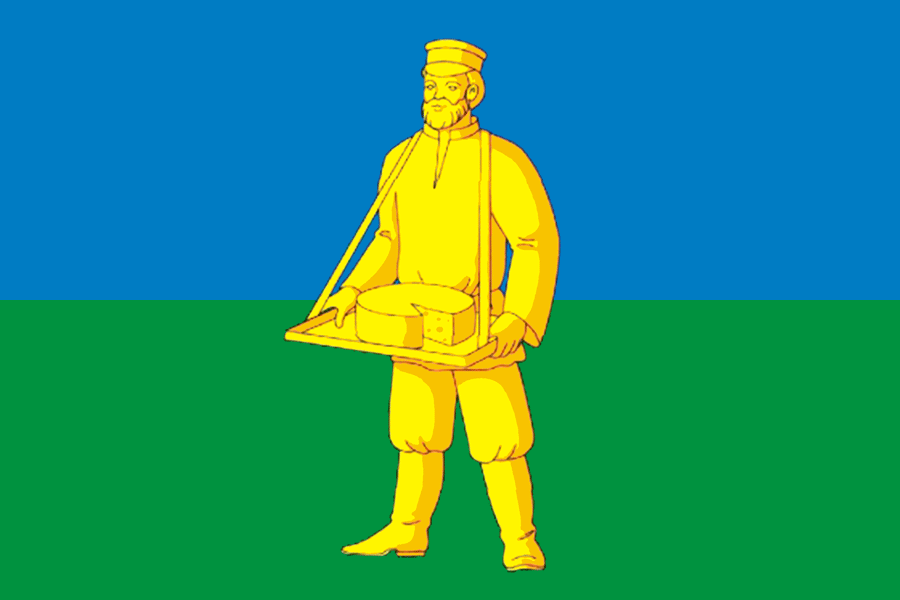
Flag of Lotoshino

Lotoshino (Russian: Лотошино́) is an urban locality (an urban-type settlement) and the administrative center of Lotoshinsky District of Moscow Oblast, Russia. It is the least populous administrative center of a district in Moscow Oblast. Population: 5,558 (2010 census); 5,670 (2002 census); 8,752 (1989 Soviet census).

Lotoshino was first mentioned in a chronicle in 1478. Under the Russian Empire, it was a village within Volokolamsky Uyezd of Moscow Governorate, but it was not even a volost center. It became the administrative center of the district in 1929, when Moscow Oblast was founded. In 1951, it was granted urban-type settlement status.

Postal codes: 143800, 143801.
