= Martin Shakkum =

Russian politician, economist and psychologist

- Мартин Шаккум
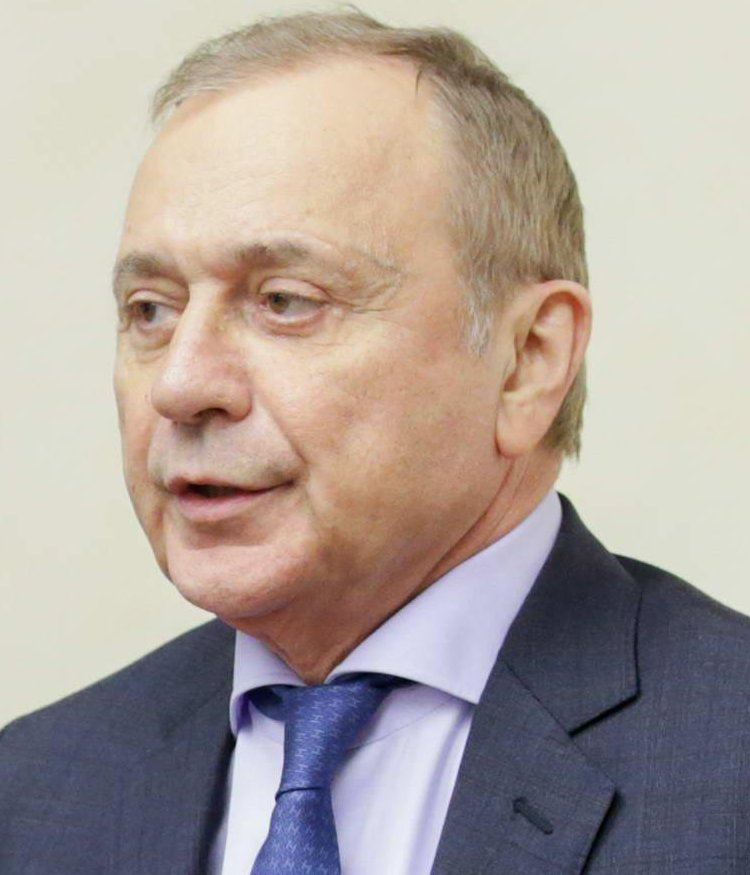
- Shakkum in 2018

Member of the State Duma for Moscow Oblast
- In office 5 October 2016 – 12 October 2021
- Preceded by: constituency re-established
- Succeeded by: Sergey Kolunov
- In office 18 January 2000 – 24 December 2007
- Preceded by: Dmitry Krasnikov
- Succeeded by: constituencies abolished
- Constituency: Krasnogorsk (No. 120)

Member of the State Duma (Party List Seat)
- In office 24 December 2007 – 5 October 2016

Personal details
- Born: 21 September 1951 (age 74) Krasnogorsk, Moscow Oblast, Russian SFSR, USSR
- Party: United Russia (since 2002); Fatherland – All Russia (until 2002); Socialist People's Party (1996)

Martin Lucianovich Shakkum (Russian: Мартин Люцианович Шаккум; born 21 September 1951) is a Russian politician, economist and psychologist. He was a member of the State Duma between 1999 and 2021.

Shakkum was a candidate in the 1996 Russian presidential election.

== Biography ==
=== Early life ===
Shakkum was born on 21 September 1951 in Krasnogorsk, Moscow Oblast, Russian SFSR, USSR. His father was an ethnic Latvian, his mother - Russian. He studied at school No.7 of Krasnogorsk. He graduated from Kaliningrad Higher Military Engineering College, then All-Union Correspondence Civil Engineering Institute. For three years he worked as an employee of the laboratory of the Space Research Institute in Moscow.

From 1978 to 1991 he worked as a service–engineer, chief engineer, deputy chief and then chief of special works of the Main Department for Construction in the Moscow Oblast.

From 1991 to 1999 Shakkum was CEO, Vice President and then President of the International Fund for Economic and Social Reforms ("Reforma" Fund). This Fund was created by Martin Shakkum together with academicians-economists Stanislav Shatalin, Leonid Abalkin, political scientist Andranik Migranyan and other prominent scientists and public figures.

=== Presidential campaign ===
Shakkum ran for President as independent candidate in the 1996 Russian presidential election.

An associate of radical economist Shatalin, Shakkum was on the right wing of the Russian political spectrum. While he presented an authoritarian personality, he held moderate positions on many social issues.

To protect the rights and liberties of citizens against government corruption and abuses of power, Shakkum proposed forming a chain of executive power, excluding the possibility of concentration of various forms of power in the hands of individual central and regional elites. Specifically, he proposed forming 19 federal administrative districts across Russia, creating a system of separate federal executive bodies.

He also proposed requiring all civil servants of federal and regional government bodies and deputies of elective bodies to publish their income reports and documentation of all property belonging to them and their immediate relatives, including adult children, both in Russia and abroad.

To address the nation's economic woes, Shakkum proposed, "establishing a reliable system of control over cash flows and strengthening the country's banking system by reorganizing it and creating special investment banks."

At the same time, however, Shakkum supported the existence natural resource monopolies, such as Gazprom, and warned against attempts to split them into smaller entities.

Shakkum's original registration had been rejected by the Central Election Commission on account of lacking a sufficient number of signatures. However, Shakkum successfully managed to appeal through the Supreme Court.

In April 1996, he created the Socialist People's Party and became its leader.

Shakkum received 277,068 votes in the first round (0.4% of the overall vote).

=== Subsequent career ===
In 1998, Shakkum survived an assassination attempt. On 8 September, around 9 PM, near his house, his car was shot from a machine gun. Shakkum was not injured. However, the employee of Fund "Reform" Valery Basok, who was with him in the car, received a slight injury. Commenting on the attack, Shakkum stated that he could not link the incident to his personal and public life.

In December 1999, Shakkum was elected to the State Duma for the Istra single-member constituency. He was supported by the electoral bloc Fatherland — All Russia. In the election, Martin Shakkum was ahead of three incumbent State Duma deputies in his constituency, and showed one of the highest results in the elections for single-member constituencies in terms of the percentage of votes. In 2003, 2007, 2011 and 2016 he was re-elected to the State Duma.

Shakkum was a member of the Presidium of the General Council of United Russia in 2004-2005, and in 2006 became a member of the Supreme Council of party. In publications and speeches in 2000 and 2004, Shakkum actively supported Vladimir Putin in his presidential campaigns.

At a meeting between a United Russia faction activist and Vladimir Putin in July 2006, Shakkum publicly invited him to join the party and lead it. He told Putin that he wants to see him as national leader which then caused applause in a hall. The newspaper Moskovskij Komsomolets called Shakkum's performance "a real hit".

Shakkum has scientific degrees of Candidate of Sciences by Psychology and Doctor of Sciences by Economy.

== Honours ==
- Order of Friendship (2003)
- Order "For Merit to the Fatherland" 4th class (2006)
- Order "For Merit to the Fatherland" 3rd class (2012)
