= Sergey Kolunov =

Russian politician

- Сергей Колунов
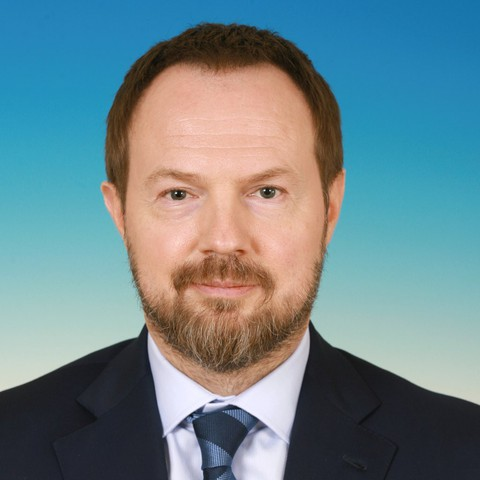
- official portrait, circa 2021

Member of the State Duma for Moscow Oblast
- Incumbent
- Assumed office 19 September 2021
- Preceded by: Martin Shakkum
- Constituency: Krasnogorsk (No. 120)

Personal details
- Born: 22 March 1973 (age 53) Kazan, Tatar ASSR, Russian SFSR, USSR
- Party: United Russia
- Spouse: Elena Kolunova
- Children: Ilya Sergeyevich (son)
- Education: State University of Management; University of Wolverhampton

Sergey Vladimirovich Kolunov (Russian: Сергей Владимирович Колунов; born 22 March 1973, Kazan, Tatar Autonomous Soviet Socialist Republic) is a Russian political figure and deputy of the 8th State Duma.

After graduating from the State University of Management in 1995, Kolunov had an internship at the University of Wolverhampton (Great Britain). In 1995–2003, he worked as a representative of the Italian Furniture Company. In 2003, he founded his own investment and development company "Sadovoe Koltso". Since September 2021, he has served as deputy of the 8th State Duma.

== Sanctions ==
He was sanctioned by the UK government in 2022 in relation to the Russo-Ukrainian War.
