= Lotoshinsky District =

Lotoshinsky District Лотошинский район (Russian)
- District
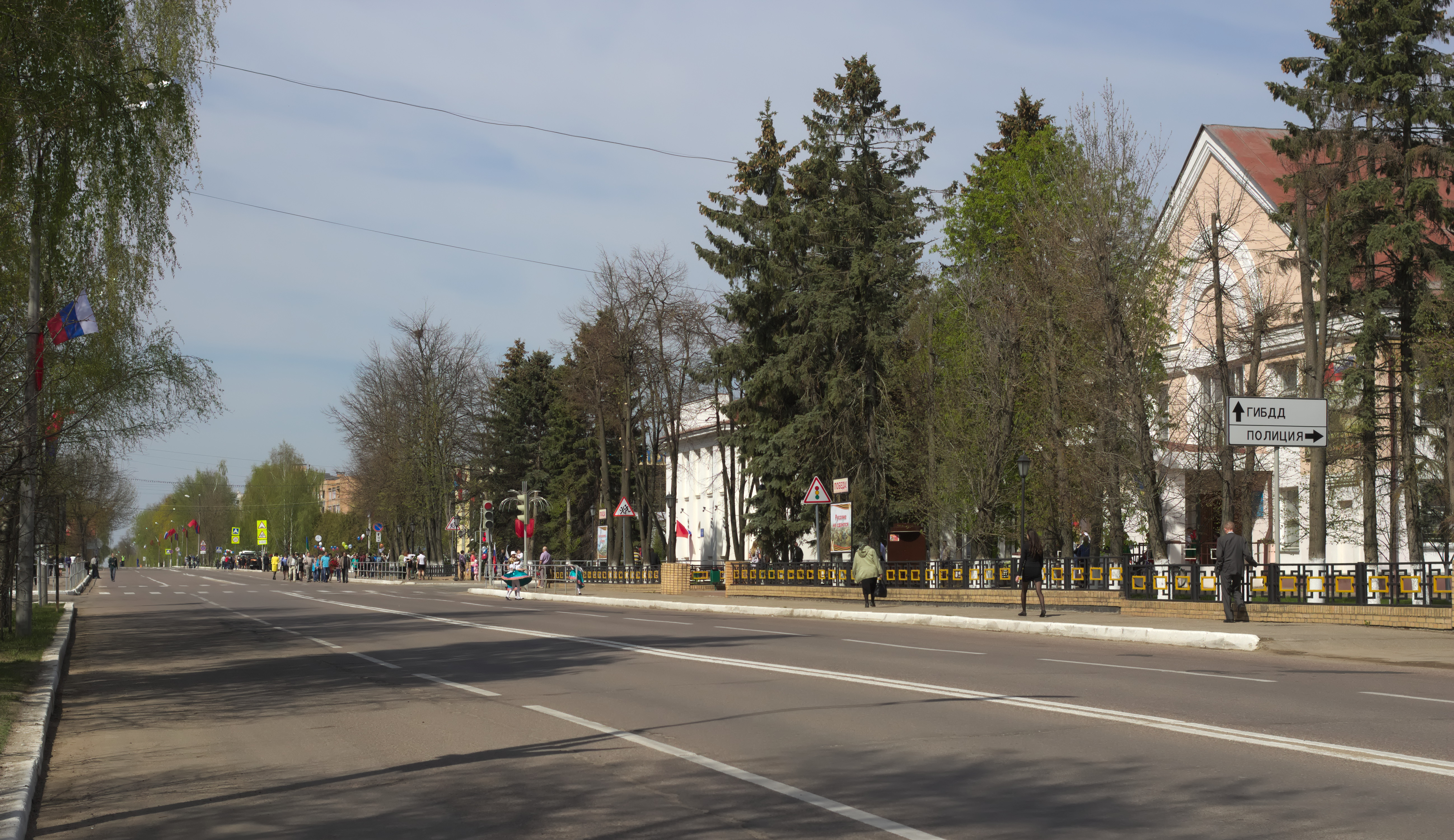
- Street view in Lotoshino, Lotshinsky District

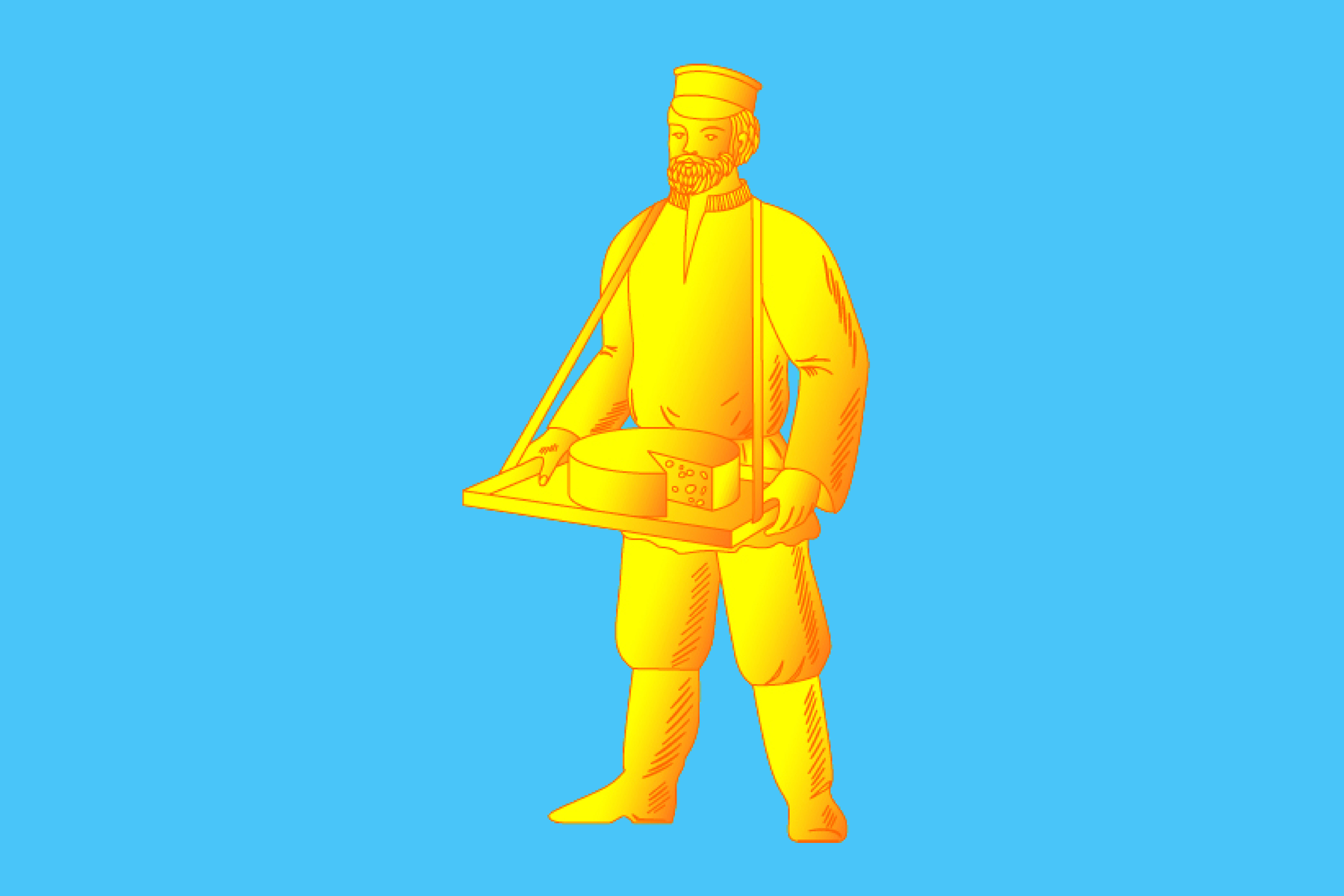
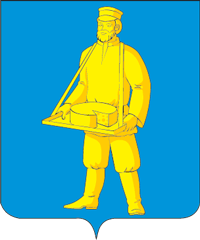
- Flag Coat of arms
- Location of Lotoshinsky District in Moscow Oblast (before July 2012)
- Coordinates: 56°13′48″N 35°38′12″E
- Country: Russia
- Federal subject: Moscow Oblast
- Established: 1929
- Administrative center: Lotoshino

Area
  - Total: 979.57 km^{2} (378.21 sq mi)

Population (2010 Census)
  - Total: 17,859
  - Density: 18.231/km^{2} (47.219/sq mi)
  - Urban: 31.1%
  - Rural: 68.9%

Administrative structure
  - Administrative divisions: 1 Work settlements, 2 Rural settlements
  - Inhabited localities: 1 urban-type settlements, 123 rural localities

Municipal structure
  - Municipally incorporated as: Lotoshinsky Municipal District
  - Municipal divisions: 1 urban settlements, 2 rural settlements
- Time zone: UTC+3 (MSK)
- OKTMO ID: 46629000
- Website: http://lotoshino.org/

Lotoshinsky District (Russian: Лотоши́нский райо́н) is an administrative and municipal district (raion), one of the thirty-six in Moscow Oblast, Russia. It is located in the northwest of the oblast and borders with Tver Oblast in the north and west, Volokolamsky District in the southeast, Shakhovskoy District in the southwest, and with Klinsky District in the east. The area of the district is 979.57 square kilometers (378.21 sq mi). Its administrative center is the urban locality (a work settlement) of Lotoshino. Population: 17,859 (2010 Census); 18,337 (2002 census); 18,290 (1989 Soviet census). The population of Lotoshino accounts for 31.1% of the district's total population.

== Geography ==
About 40% of the district's territory is covered by forests. Major rivers flowing through the district include the Lama and the Lob.

== History ==
The district was created in 1929.
