= Krasnogorsky, Republic of Bashkortostan =

Rural locality in Bashkortostan, Russia

Krasnogorsky Красногорский
- Khutor
- Location within Bashkortostan Location within Russia
- Coordinates: 53°05′N 56°00′E
- Country: Russia
- Region: Bashkortostan
- District: Meleuzovsky District
- Time zone: UTC+5:00

Krasnogorsky (Russian: Красногорский) is a rural locality (a khutor) in Araslanovsky Selsoviet, Meleuzovsky District, Bashkortostan, Russia. The population was 96 as of 2010. There are 2 streets.

== Geography ==
Krasnogorsky is located 24 km north of Meleuz (the district's administrative centre) by road. Vasilyevka is the nearest rural locality.
