= Yevgeni Gerasimov (footballer) =

Russian footballer and coach

Personal information
- Full name: Yevgeni Viktorovich Gerasimov
- Date of birth: 27 March 1968 (age 58)
- Place of birth: Legnica, Poland
- Height: 1.74 m (5 ft 8 1/2 in)
- Position: Defender

Senior career*
Years	Team	Apps	(Gls)
1986–1988	FC Zenit Leningrad	3	(0)
1989–1992	FC Dynamo St. Petersburg	138	(4)
1993–1994	FC Zenit St. Petersburg	31	(3)
1994	→ FC Zenit-d St. Petersburg	3	(0)
1994	FC Vympel Rybinsk	22	(1)
1995–1998	FC Tekstilshchik Kamyshin	81	(1)
1998	FC Fakel Voronezh	11	(0)
1999	FC Balakovo	26	(0)
2000	FC Metallurg Lipetsk	3	(0)
2001	FC SKA St. Petersburg (amateur)		
2002	FC Kukaracha St. Petersburg		
2002	FC Petrotrest St. Petersburg (amateur)		
2003	FC Petrotrest St. Petersburg	21	(0)
2004	FC FShI Master-Saturn Yegoryevsk		

Managerial career
- 2008: FC Master-Saturn Yegoryevsk
- * Club domestic league appearances and goals

Yevgeni Viktorovich Gerasimov (Russian: Евгений Викторович Герасимов; born 27 March 1968 in Legnica) is a Russian football coach and a former player.
