= Krasnogorsky, Ivanovo Oblast =

Krasnogorsky Красногорский
- Village
- Location within Ivanovo Oblast Location within Russia
- Coordinates: 57°30′N 42°49′E
- Country: Russia
- Region: Ivanovo Oblast
- District: Kineshemsky District
- Time zone: UTC+3:00

Krasnogorsky (Russian: Красногорский) is a rural locality (a selo) in Kineshemsky District, Ivanovo Oblast, Russia. Population: 183 (2010 census);

== Geography ==
This rural locality is located 42 kilometres (26 mi) from Kineshma (the district's administrative centre), 125 kilometres (78 mi) from Ivanovo (capital of Ivanovo Oblast) and 367 kilometres (228 mi) from Moscow. Vedrovo is the nearest rural locality.
