= Shakhovskaya, Moscow Oblast =

Human settlement in Shakhovskoy District, Moscow Oblast, Russia

Coordinates: 56°01′58″N 35°30′31″E

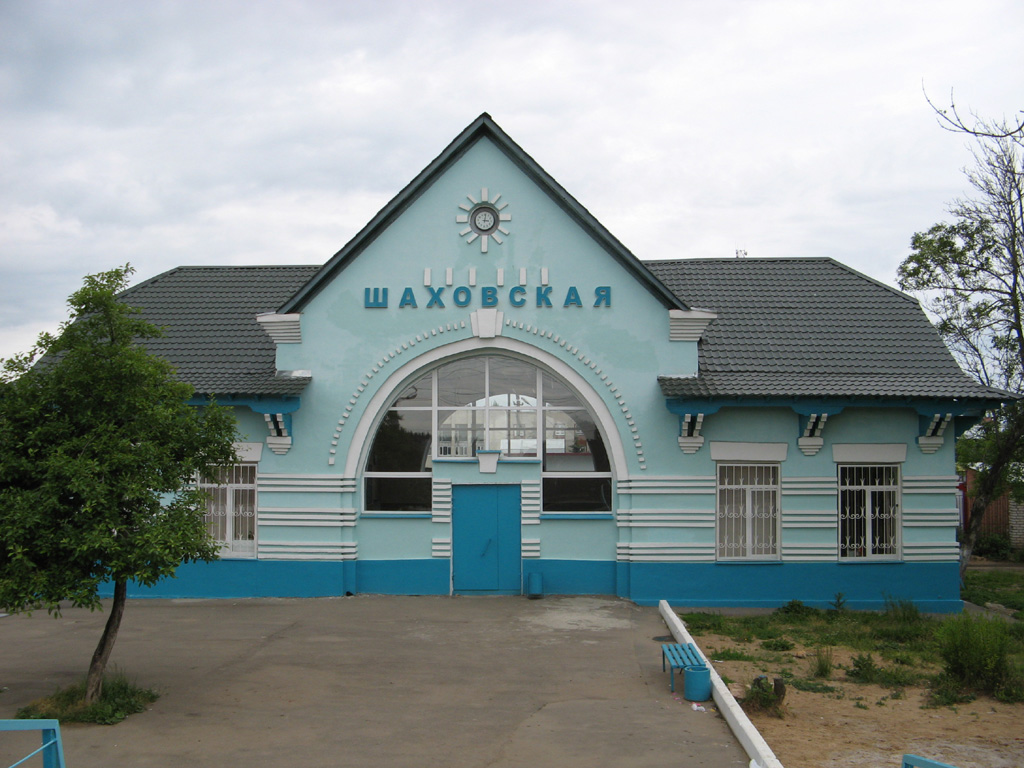
Railroad station building in Shakhovskaya

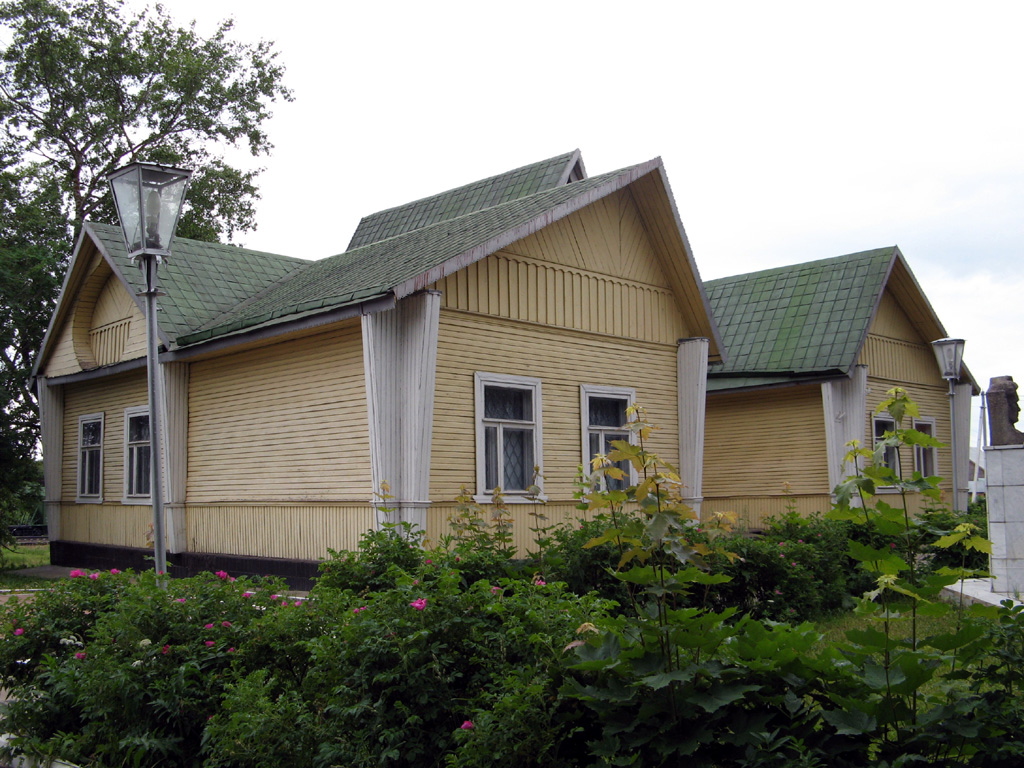
Museum of local lore in Shakhovskaya

Shakhovskaya (Russian: Шаховская) is an urban locality (a work settlement) and the administrative center of Shakhovskoy District of Moscow Oblast, Russia, located on the Izel and the Khovanka Rivers, 154 kilometers (96 mi) from Moscow. Population: 10,728 (2010 census); 10,439 (2002 census); 10,393 (1989 Soviet census). Postal code: 143700. Dialing code: +7 49637. Municipally, it is incorporated as Shakhovskaya Urban Settlement.

Shakhovskaya was founded in 1901 during the construction of the Moscow-Vindava railroad. It became the administrative center of the district on August 4, 1929, when Moscow Oblast was founded, and was granted urban-type settlement status in 1958.

Shakhovskaya stands on the M9 highway (Moscow–Riga) and the Moscow–Riga railway, being the terminus of suburban trains from Moscow.
