= Vyacheslav Solovyov =

Vyacheslav Solovyov (or Soloviev) may refer to the following Russian people:

- Vyacheslav Solovyov (footballer) (1925–1996)
- Vyacheslav Solovyov (serial killer) (1970–2008)
