= Voskhod, Moscow Oblast =

Closed settlement in Moscow Oblast, Russia

Voskhod Восход
- Settlement
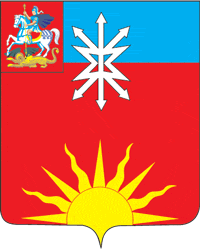
- Flag Coat of arms
- Interactive map of Voskhod
- Location of Voskhod Voskhod (Moscow Oblast)
- Coordinates: 55°58′27″N 36°27′26″E
- Country: Russia
- Federal subject: Moscow Oblast
- Founded: 1965

Population (2010 Census)
  - Total: 2,007
  - Estimate (2025): 2,056 (+2.4%)

Administrative status
  - Subordinated to: closed administrative-territorial formation of Voskhod
  - Capital of: closed administrative-territorial formation of Voskhod

Municipal status
  - Urban okrug: Voskhod Urban Okrug
  - Capital of: Voskhod Urban Okrug
- Time zone: UTC+3 (MSK)
- Postal code: 143562
- Dialing code: +7 49631
- OKTMO ID: 46763000051

Voskhod (Russian: Восхо́д) is a closed urban locality (a settlement) in Moscow Oblast, Russia. It was formerly called Novopetrovsk-2 (Новопетровск-2). Population: 2,007 (2010 census); 1,785 (2002 census);

== Overview ==
It is located near the Moscow-Volokolamsk highway and the Novorozhdestvensky Forest, and was involved in the November 1941 Battle of Moscow between Germany and the Soviet Union.

== Administrative and municipal status ==
Within the administrative divisions framework, it is incorporated as the closed administrative-territorial formation of Voskhod—an administrative unit with the status equal to that of the districts. As a municipal division, the closed administrative-territorial formation of Voskhod is incorporated as Voskhod Urban Okrug.
