= Krasnogorsky District =

Krasnogorsky District (Russian: Красного́рский райо́н, Krasnogórskiy raion) is the name of several administrative and municipal districts in Russia. The name is generally derived from or related to the collocation "krasnaya gora", meaning roughly "(a) red/beautiful mountain(s)/hill(s)".

== Districts of the federal subjects ==
Federal subjects of Russia which have an entity called Krasnogorsky District

- Krasnogorsky District, Altai Krai, an administrative and municipal district of Altai Krai
- Krasnogorsky District, Bryansk Oblast, an administrative and municipal district of Bryansk Oblast
- Krasnogorsky District, Moscow Oblast, an administrative and municipal district of Moscow Oblast
- Krasnogorsky District, Udmurt Republic, an administrative and municipal district of the Udmurt Republic

== City divisions ==
Location of Kamensk-Uralsky in Russia
- Krasnogorsky City District, a city district of Kamensk-Uralsky, a city in Sverdlovsk Oblast

== See also ==
- Krasnogorsk (disambiguation)
