= Krasnaya Gora, Vladimir Oblast =

Krasnaya Gora Красная Гора
- Village
- Location within Vladimir Oblast Location within Russia
- Coordinates: 56°27′N 39°20′E
- Country: Russia
- Region: Vladimir Oblast
- District: Kolchuginsky District
- Time zone: UTC+3:00

Krasnaya Gora (Russian: Красная Гора) is a rural locality (a village) in Ilyinskoye Rural Settlement, Kolchuginsky District, Vladimir Oblast, Russia. The population was 48 as of 2010. There are 4 streets.

== Geography ==
Krasnaya Gora is located on the Peksha River, 22 km north of Kolchugino (the district's administrative centre) by road. Bolshepetrovskoye is the nearest rural locality.
