= Krasnogorsky, Volgograd Oblast =

Krasnogorsky Красногорский
- Khutor
- Location within Volgograd Oblast Location within Russia
- Coordinates: 50°25′N 42°49′E
- Country: Russia
- Region: Volgograd Oblast
- District: Novoanninsky District
- Time zone: UTC+4:00

Krasnogorsky (Russian: Красногорский) is a rural locality (a khutor) in Amovskoye Rural Settlement, Novoanninsky District, Volgograd Oblast, Russia. The population was 122 as of 2010. There are 2 streets.

== Geography ==
Krasnogorsky is located 24 km southeast of Novoanninsky (the district's administrative centre) by road. Panfilovo is the nearest rural locality.
