= Yevgeni Gerasimov =

Yevgeni Gerasimov may refer to:

- Yevgeni Gerasimov (footballer)
- Yevgeni Gerasimov (actor)
