= Valters un Rapa =

Company based in Riga, Latvia

- Industry: Specialty retail
- Founded: 1912
- Founders: Jānis Rapa, Arturs Valters
- Headquarters: Riga, Latvia
- Products: Books, notebooks
- Services: Printing, publishing
- Website: http://www.valtersunrapa.lv

Grāmatu Nams Valters un Rapa (Book House Valters and Rapa) is a bookstore and publishing house in Riga, Latvia.

== History ==
In 1912, Janis Rapa together with the bibliophile Arturs Valters founded a limited partnership "A. Valters, J. Rapa and Company", a bookstore to serve Latvian intellectuals needs. In 1920 the limited partnership was changed to Joint Stock Company and went to new premises in 11 Teatra St. In 1924 Arturs Valters died, and in 1925 J. Grins came to the assistance of J. Rapa.

Following the Soviet occupation of Latvia in 1940, the property owned by the Joint Stock Company was nationalized and operation of the company was stopped. There was established the Publishing House of the State Printing and Publishing Department and its Central bookshop on the ground of the company.

On May 10, 1996, Valters un Rapa was re-established as a Joint-stock company. On October 28 of the same year, Valters un Rapa published the first book of the re-established joint Stock Company – 2nd volume of collected works of Anna Brigadere.
