= Krasnaya Gora, Kichmengsko-Gorodetsky District, Vologda Oblast =

Krasnaya Gora Красная Гора
- Village
- Location within Vologda Oblast Location within Russia
- Coordinates: 59°59′N 46°25′E
- Country: Russia
- Region: Vologda Oblast
- District: Kichmengsko-Gorodetsky District
- Time zone: UTC+3:00

Krasnaya Gora (Russian: Красная Гора) is a rural locality (a village) in Yenangskoye Rural Settlement, Kichmengsko-Gorodetsky District, Vologda Oblast, Russia. The population was 12 as of 2002.

== Geography ==
Krasnaya Gora is located 52 km east of Kichmengsky Gorodok (the district's administrative centre) by road. Pakhomovo is the nearest rural locality.
