= Denis Kravchenko =

Russian politician

- Денис Кравченко
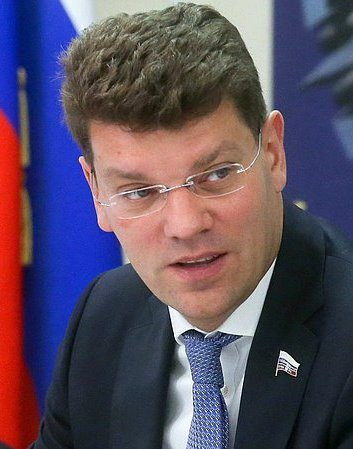

Deputy of the 8th State Duma
- Incumbent
- Assumed office 19 September 2021

Deputy of the 7th State Duma
- In office 5 October 2016 – 12 October 2021

Personal details
- Born: 17 April 1976 (age 50) Volgograd, Russian Soviet Federative Socialist Republic, USSR
- Party: United Russia
- Education: Peter the Great St. Petersburg Polytechnic University

Denis Kravchenko (Russian: Денис Борисович Кравченко; born 17 April 1976, in Volgograd) is a Russian political figure and deputy of the 8th State Duma. He holds a Candidate of Sciences in Economics degree (2005)

From 1999 to 2001, he was the Deputy Chairman and, later, the Chairman of the Student Council of the Saint Petersburg City Administration. From July 2001 to March 2002, he was an assistant to the First Vice-president of St. Petersburg State Polytechnical University. In 2003, Kravchenko joined the United Russia. From 2011 to 2013, he worked as deputy to the Governor of Pskov Oblast Andrey Turchak. In 2016, he became the deputy of the 7th State Duma. In 2021, he was re-elected for the 8th State Duma from the Moscow Oblast constituency.

He is one of the members of the State Duma the United States Treasury sanctioned on 24 March 2022 in response to the 2022 Russian invasion of Ukraine.

Legislative activity

From 2016 to 2025, during his tenure as a deputy of the State Duma of the VII and VIII convocations, he authored more than 90 legislative initiatives and supported over 100 initiatives introduced by the Government of the Russian Federation. He is also the author of more than 200 amendments to the Federal Law “On State Support of Entrepreneurial Activity in the Arctic Zone of the Russian Federation.”
