= Krásná Hora nad Vltavou =

- Town
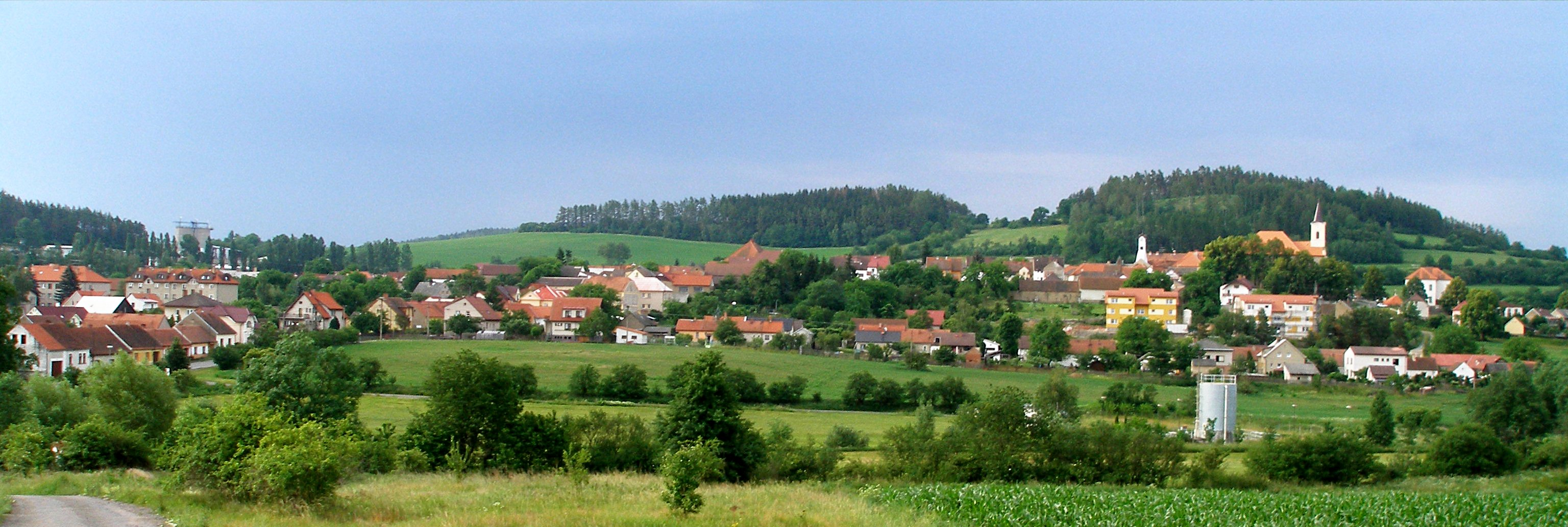
- View from the north

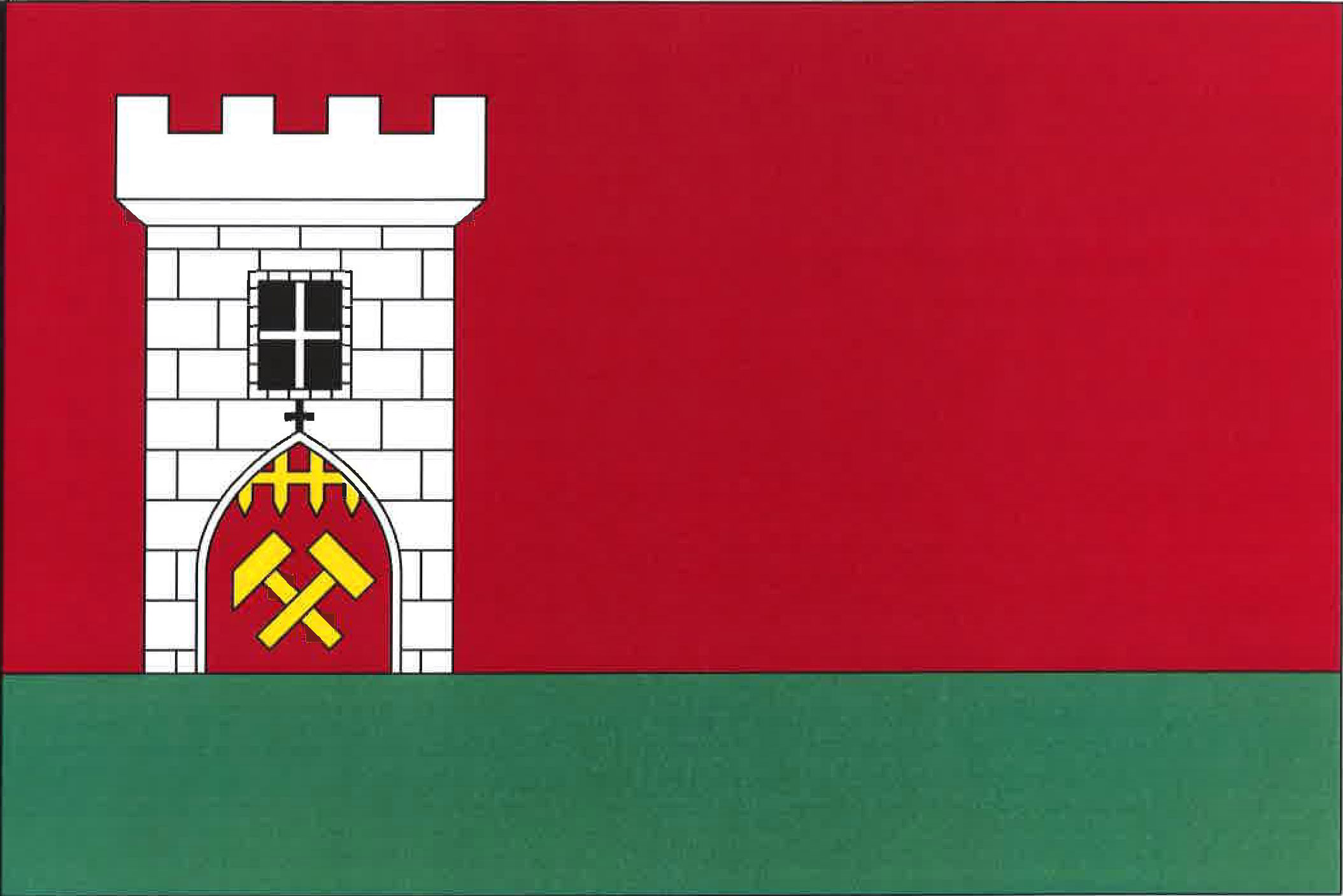
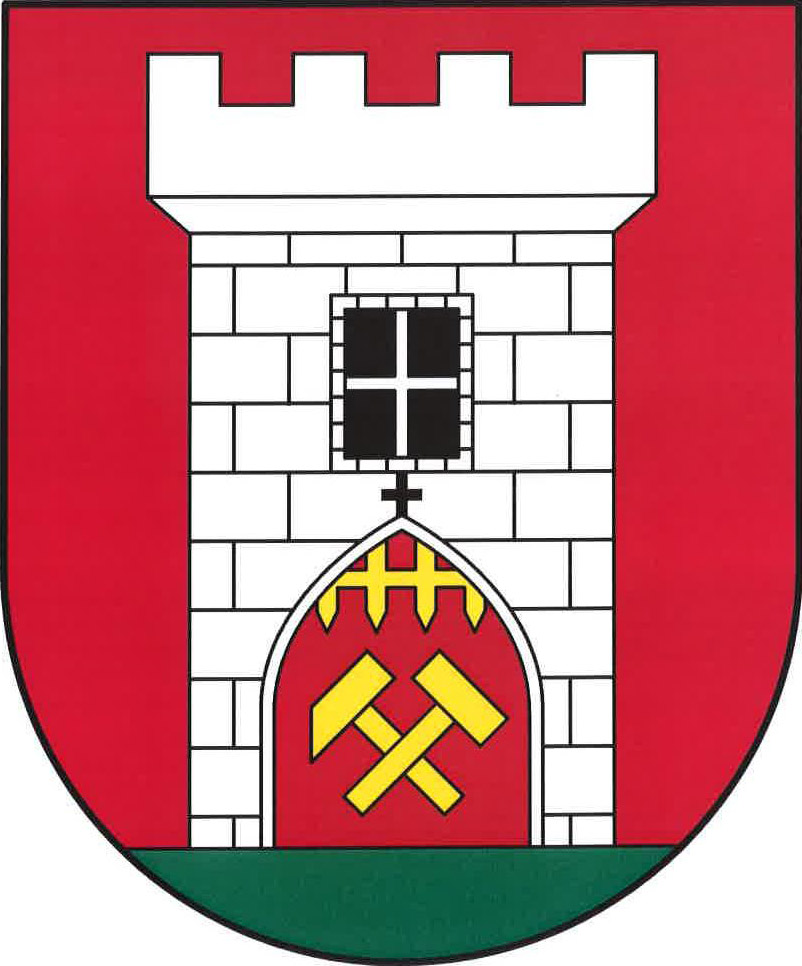
- Flag Coat of arms

- Location in the Czech Republic
- Coordinates: 49°36′17″N 14°16′39″E
- Country: Czech Republic
- Region: Central Bohemian
- District: Příbram
- First mentioned: 1341

Government
  - Mayor: Jaroslav Kříž

Area
  - Total: 36.80 km^{2} (14.21 sq mi)
- Elevation: 434 m (1,424 ft)

Population (2026-01-01)
  - Total: 1,144
  - Density: 31.09/km^{2} (80.51/sq mi)
- Time zone: UTC+1 (CET)
  - Summer (DST): UTC+2 (CEST)
- Postal code: 262 56
- Website: www.krasna-hora.cz

Krásná Hora nad Vltavou (Czech pronunciation: [ˈkraːsnaː ˈɦora ˈnad vl̩tavou]; German: Schönberg) is a town in Příbram District in the Central Bohemian Region of the Czech Republic. It has about 1,100 inhabitants. Located in the Benešov Uplands, it was founded as a mining settlement, connected with mining of gold and later antimony.

== Administrative division ==
Krásná Hora nad Vltavou consists of 11 municipal parts (in brackets population according to the 2021 census):

- Krásná Hora nad Vltavou (790)
- Hostovnice (16)
- Krašovice (47)
- Mokřice (26)
- Plešiště (16)
- Podmoky (60)
- Švastalova Lhota (26)
- Tisovnice (6)
- Vletice (36)
- Vrbice (11)
- Zhoř (57)

== Etymology ==
The name Krásná Hora literally means "beautiful mountain". The name arose due to the mining activity, when gold and later antimony were mined here. The suffix nad Vltavou ('upon the Vltava') was added in 1907 to distinguish it from other places with the same name.

== Geography ==
Krásná Hora nad Vltavou is located about 21 kilometres (13 mi) east of Příbram and 47 km (29 mi) south of Prague. It lies in the Benešov Uplands. The highest point is the hill Bukovec at 554 m (1,818 ft) above sea level. The Brzina Stream flows through the municipal territory. In the west, the municipal border is formed by the Kamýk Reservoir, built on the Vltava River.

== History ==
The first written mention of Krásná Hora is from 1341, when it was listed among the mining settlements. Gold was first panned here and then mined together with antimony. Krásná Hora received various privileges from the Czech kings and became a royal town. It lost this title in 1554, which also meant the loss of privileges and gradual decline. The decline was completed by the Thirty Years' War, when mining came to an end.

The town then often changed owners. Mining of antimony was first revived briefly between 1700 and 1712, and then to a greater extent during the 19th century. The mines reached their peak in 1881, when 700 miners were employed there.

== Demographics ==
Historical population

Year	Pop.	±%
1869	2,447	—
1880	2,418	−1.2%
1890	2,416	−0.1%
1900	2,509	+3.8%
1910	2,200	−12.3%

Year	Pop.	±%
1921	2,112	−4.0%
1930	1,937	−8.3%
1950	1,472	−24.0%
1961	1,478	+0.4%
1970	1,323	−10.5%

Year	Pop.	±%
1980	1,129	−14.7%
1991	1,116	−1.2%
2001	1,047	−6.2%
2011	1,067	+1.9%
2021	1,091	+2.2%

Source: Censuses

== Transport ==
There are no railways or major roads passing through the municipality.

== Sights ==
The main landmarks of Krásná Hora nad Vltavou are the town hall and Church of Saint Nicholas. The church was first documented in 1350. The original Gothic church collapsed in 1839 and was replaced by a new one, built in 1850–1855.

In the village of Plešiště is a building called Holanova Turyně. It was a medieval fortress, which was rebuilt in the Baroque style and then further modified in the 19th century. It is a cultural monument.
