= Krasnogorsk =

Krasnogorsk may refer to one of the following:

- Krasnogorsk Urban Settlement, a municipal formation which the City of Krasnogorsk in Krasnogorsky District of Moscow Oblast, Russia is incorporated as
- Krasnogorsk, Russia, several inhabited localities in Russia
  - Krasnogorsk, Moscow Oblast
- Krasnogorsk, Uzbekistan, a town in Tashkent Province of Uzbekistan
- Krasnogorsk (camera), a Soviet brand of film camera
- Krasnogorsk, a Soviet ZX Spectrum computer clone

== See also ==
- Krasnogorsky (disambiguation)
- Krasnaya Gora
