= Klin, Klinsky District, Moscow Oblast =

Town in Moscow Oblast, Russia

Klin Клин
- Town
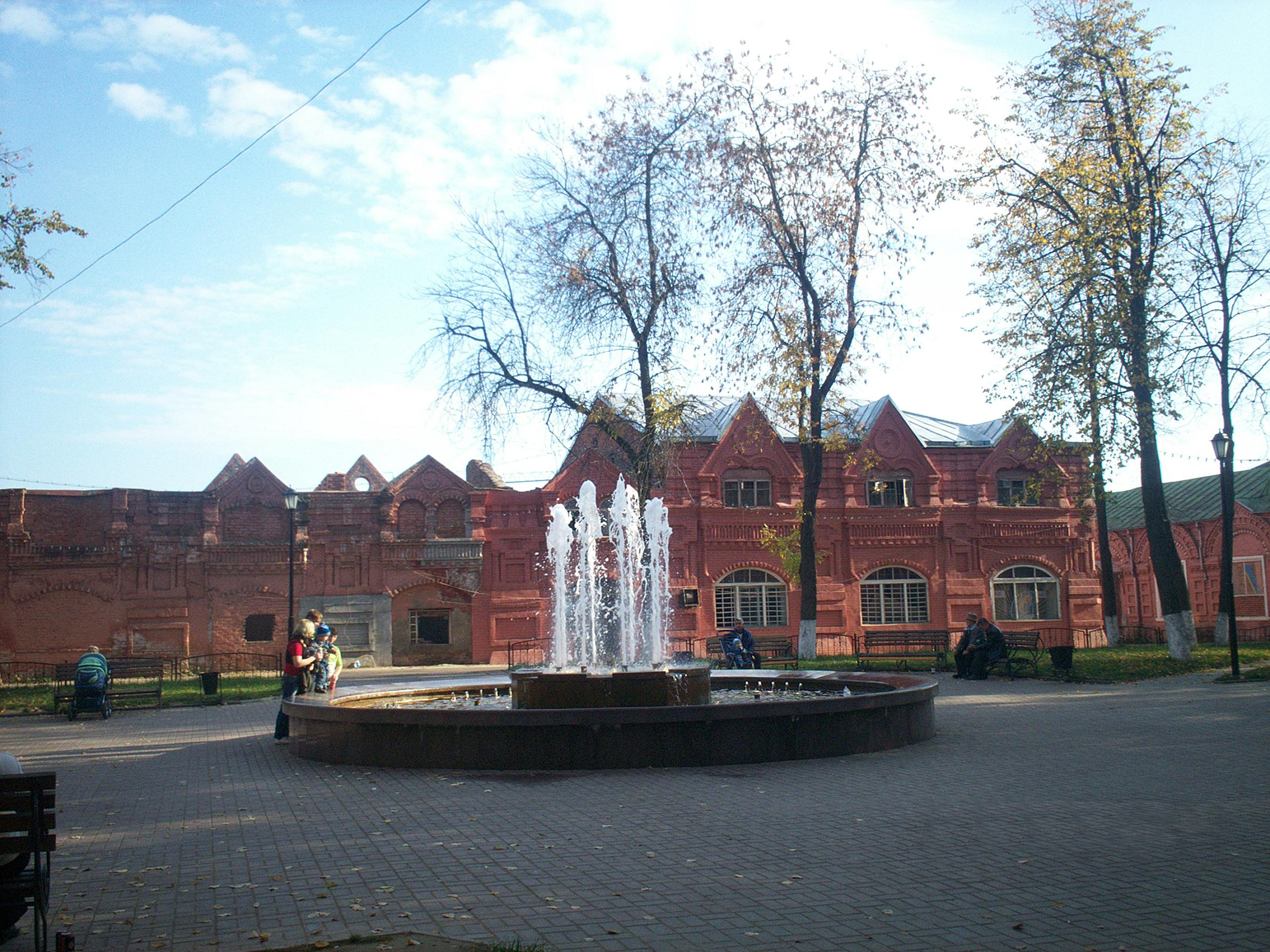
- Sovetskaya Square in Klin

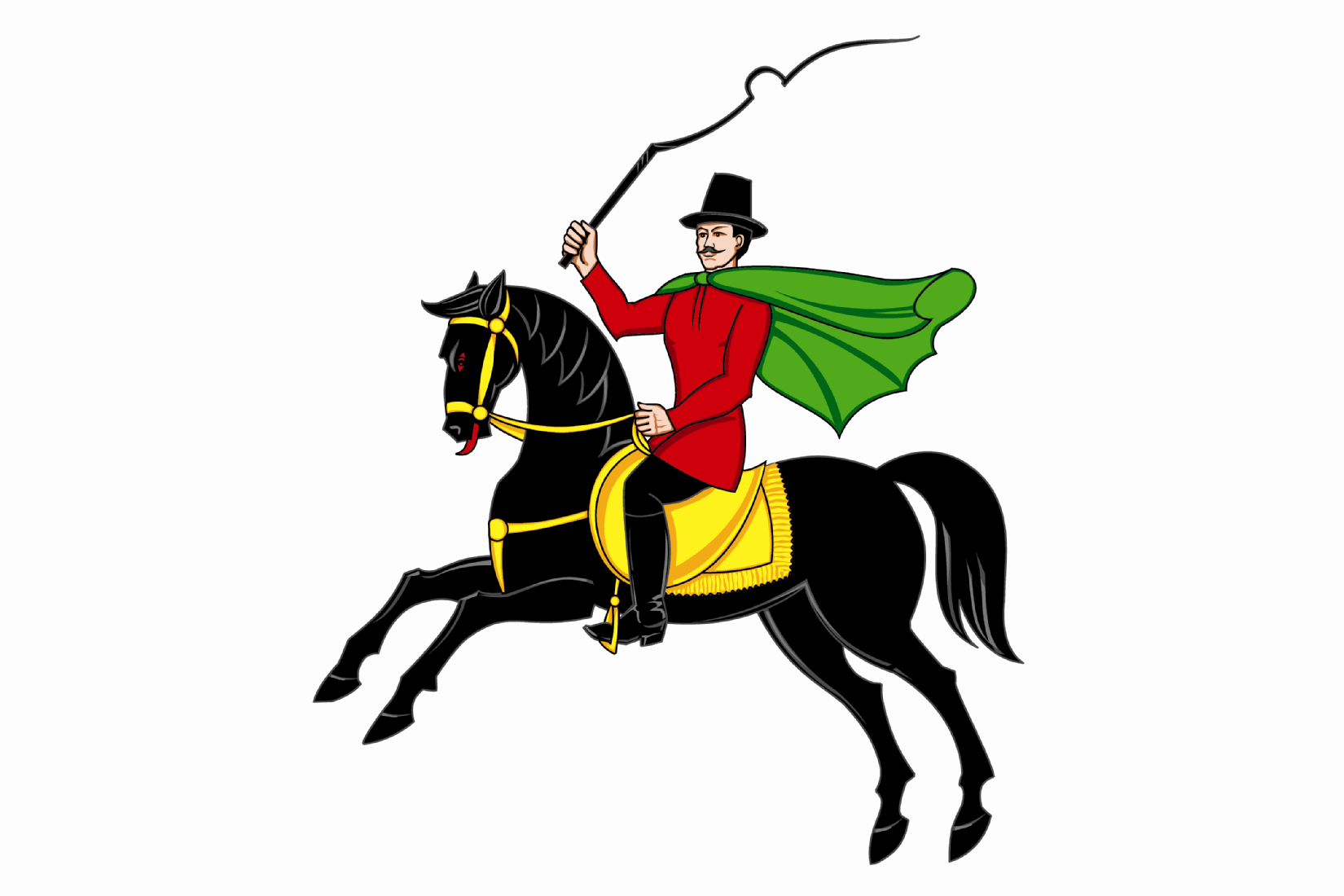
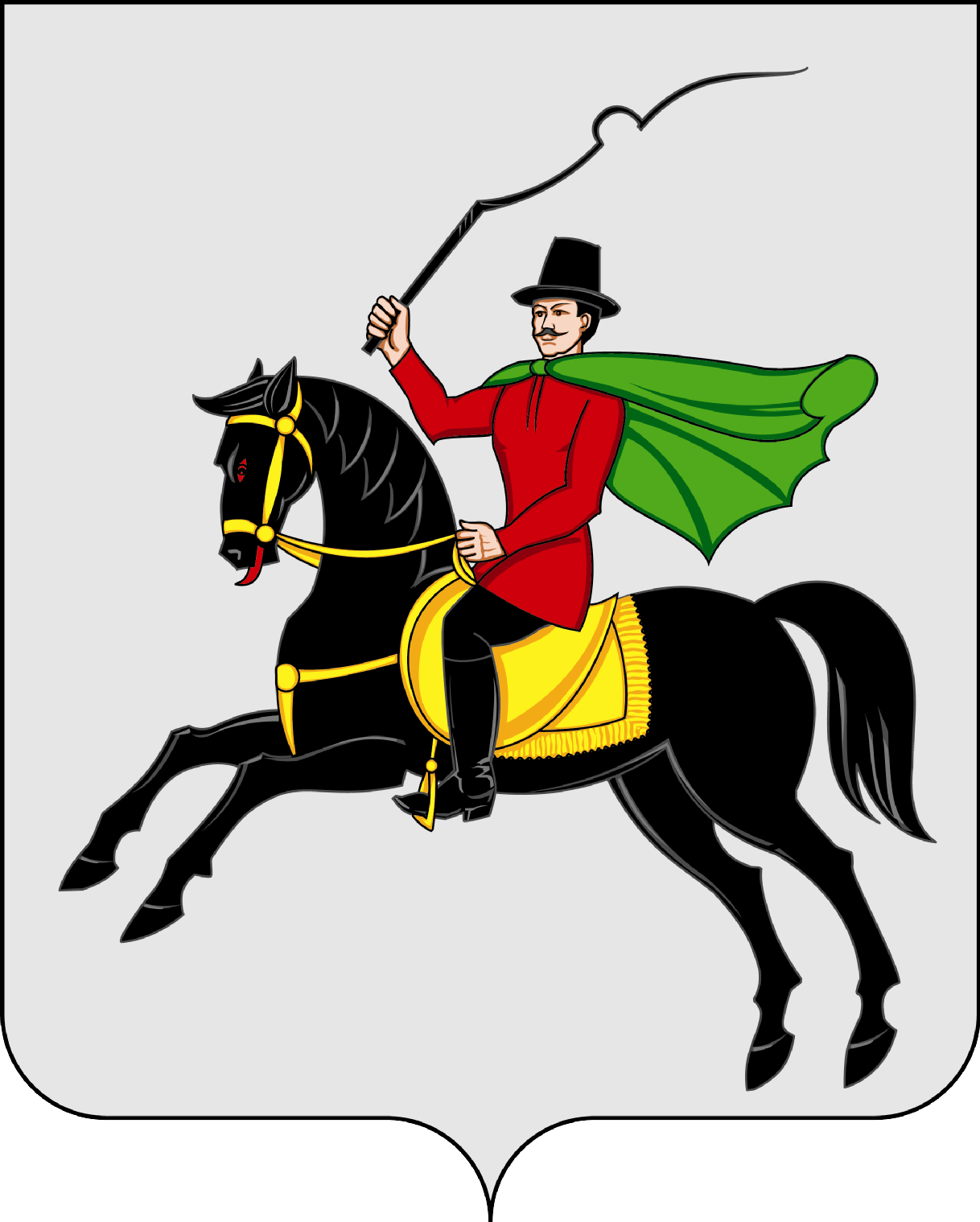
- Flag Coat of arms
- Interactive map of Klin
- Location of Klin Klin (Moscow Oblast)
- Coordinates: 56°20′N 36°44′E
- Country: Russia
- Federal subject: Moscow Oblast
- Administrative district: Klinsky District
- TownSelsoviet: Klin
- Known since: 1317
- Town status since: 1781

Government
  - Head: Vasiliy Vlasov
- Elevation: 160 m (520 ft)

Population (2010 Census)
  - Total: 80,585
  - Estimate (2025): 89,153 (+10.6%)
  - Rank: 206th in 2010

Administrative status
  - Capital of: Klinsky District, Town of Klin

Municipal status
  - Municipal district: Klinsky Municipal District
  - Urban settlement: Klin Urban Settlement
  - Capital of: Klinsky Municipal District, Klin Urban Settlement
- Time zone: UTC+3 (MSK)
- Postal codes: 141601–141607, 141609, 141612, 141613, 141618
- Dialing code: +7 (496)-24
- OKTMO ID: 46737000001

Klin (Russian: Клин, lit. a wedge) is a town and the administrative center of Klinsky District in Moscow Oblast, Russia, located 85 kilometers (53 mi) northwest of Moscow. Population: 80,585 (2010 census); 83,178 (2002 census); 94,908 (1989 Soviet census); 94,000 (1985 est.).

== History ==
It has been known since 1317. In 1482, it was incorporated into the Grand Duchy of Moscow with the rest of the Principality of Tver. Town status was granted in 1781.

Klin was taken by the Germans briefly during the Battle of Moscow in 1941. The German occupation lasted from 23 November to 15 December 1941. On 19 December 1941, the British Foreign Secretary Anthony Eden and the Soviet ambassador to the United Kingdom Ivan Maysky visited the town with more than twenty correspondents during Eden's first diplomatic mission to Moscow.

== Administrative and municipal status ==
Within the framework of administrative divisions, Klin serves as the administrative center of Klinsky District. As an administrative division, it is, together with sixty-one rural localities, incorporated within Klinsky District as the Town of Klin. As a municipal division, the Town of Klin is incorporated within Klinsky Municipal District as Klin Urban Settlement.

== Architecture and culture ==
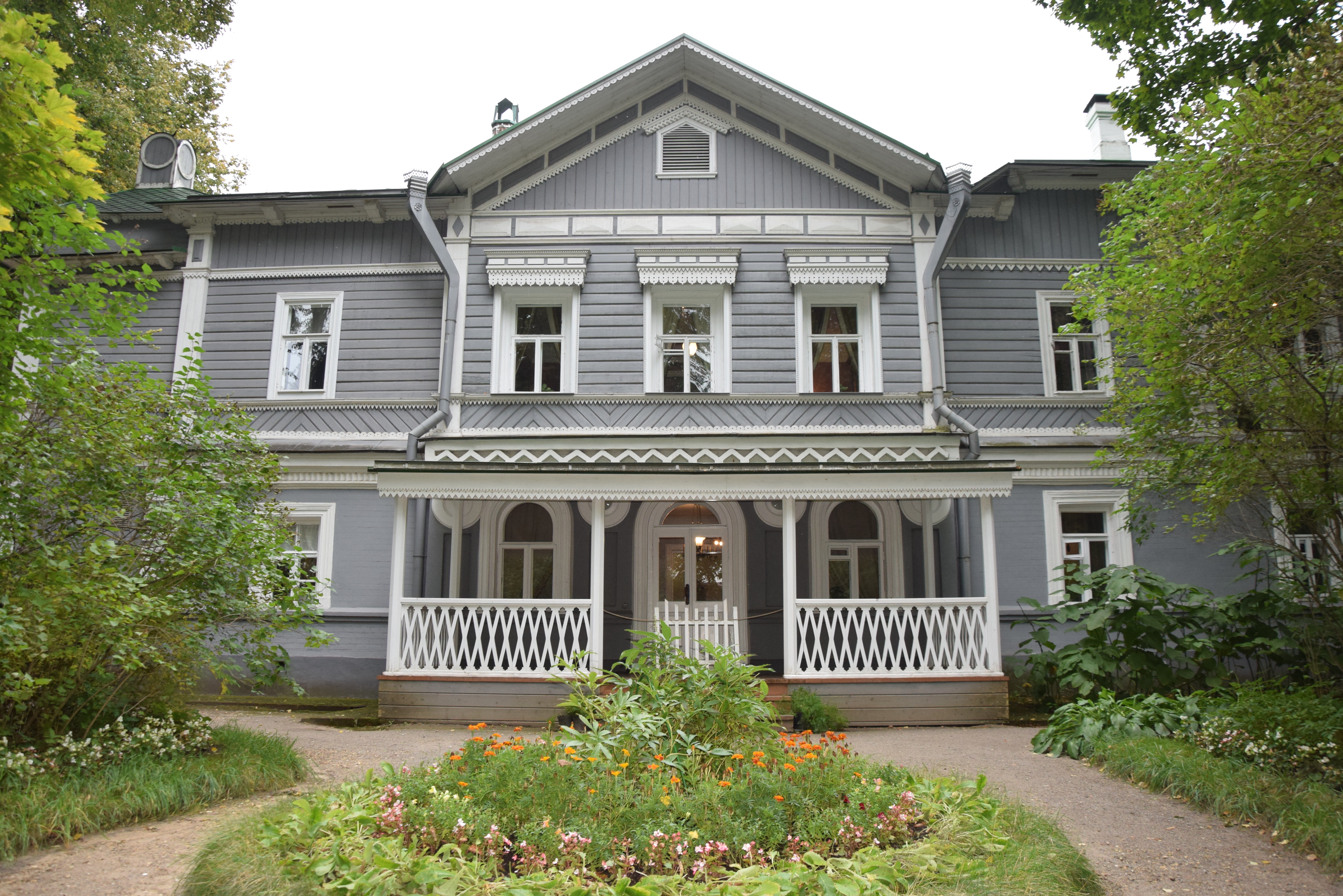
Museum of Pyotr Ilyich Tchaikovsky in Klin

The town is best known as the residence of Pyotr Ilyich Tchaikovsky, whose house, the Tchaikovsky House-Museum, is open to visitors as a museum. It was here that the composer wrote his last major work, the 6th symphony, or the "Pathetique".

Among several churches, the most noteworthy are the 16th-century church of the Dormition cloister and the baroque Resurrection cathedral (1712).

== Economy ==
There is a large beer factory, which produces Klinskoye beer.

=== Transportation ===
The M10 highway connecting Moscow to St. Petersburg and the Moscow-Saint Petersburg Railway run through the town. Also the M11 highway runs nearby

== Geography ==
=== Climate ===
Climate data for Klin
Month	Jan	Feb	Mar	Apr	May	Jun	Jul	Aug	Sep	Oct	Nov	Dec	Year
Mean daily maximum °C (°F)	−4 (25)	−3 (27)	1 (34)	10 (50)	17 (63)	21 (70)	23 (73)	22 (72)	16 (61)	9 (48)	1 (34)	−3 (27)	9 (49)
Mean daily minimum °C (°F)	−11 (12)	−11 (12)	−5 (23)	1 (34)	7 (45)	11 (52)	13 (55)	11 (52)	7 (45)	2 (36)	−3 (27)	−8 (18)	1 (34)
Average precipitation mm (inches)	35 (1.4)	34 (1.3)	33 (1.3)	40 (1.6)	66 (2.6)	80 (3.1)	69 (2.7)	64 (2.5)	60 (2.4)	53 (2.1)	44 (1.7)	39 (1.5)	617 (24.2)
Source: www.meteoblue.com

== Military ==
It was home to the Klin air base during the Cold War.

== Sports ==
Local association football team Khimik plays in the Moscow Oblast league. Titan Klin play in the VHL, the second level of Russian ice hockey.

== Notable people ==
- Sergei Tyablikov, theoretical physicist
- Yevgeny Minayev, Soviet Olympic weightlifter
- Yevgeny Leonov, film director who grew up in Klin
- Vera Mukhina, sculptor; one of the streets in the town is named after her

== Twin towns – sister cities ==
Klin is twinned with:

- Lappeenranta, Finland (1975)
- Orly, France (1980)
- Meishan, China (1998)
- Krychaw, Belarus (2002)
- Byerazino, Belarus (2005)
