= Krasna Góra =

- Village
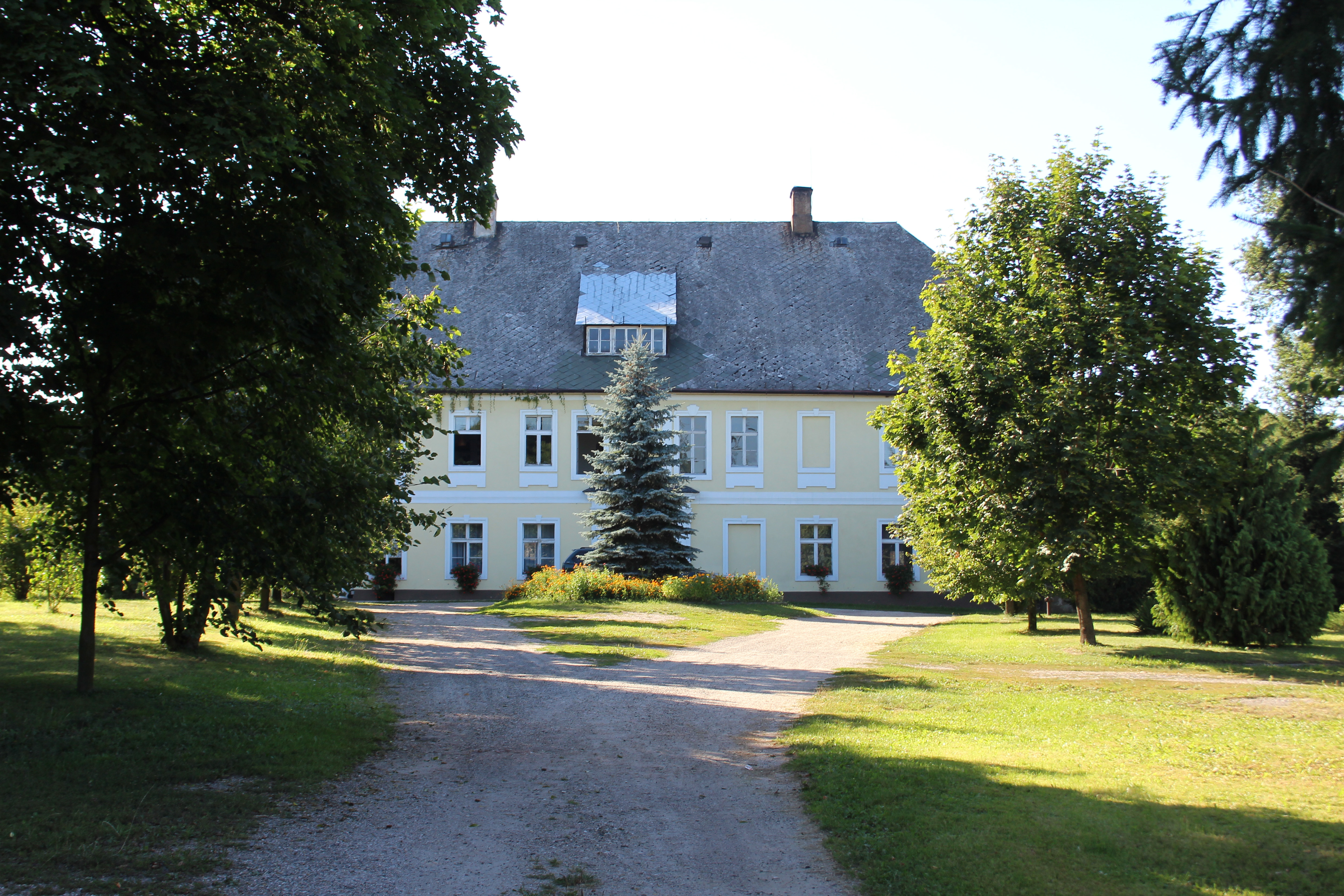

- Location within Poland
- Coordinates: 50°38′N 17°30′E
- Country: Poland
- Voivodeship: Opole
- County: Opole
- Gmina: Niemodlin

Krasna Góra [ˈkrasna ˈɡura] (German: Sonnenberg) is a village in the administrative district of Gmina Niemodlin, within Opole County, Opole Voivodeship, in south-western Poland.
