= Volokolamsky Uyezd =

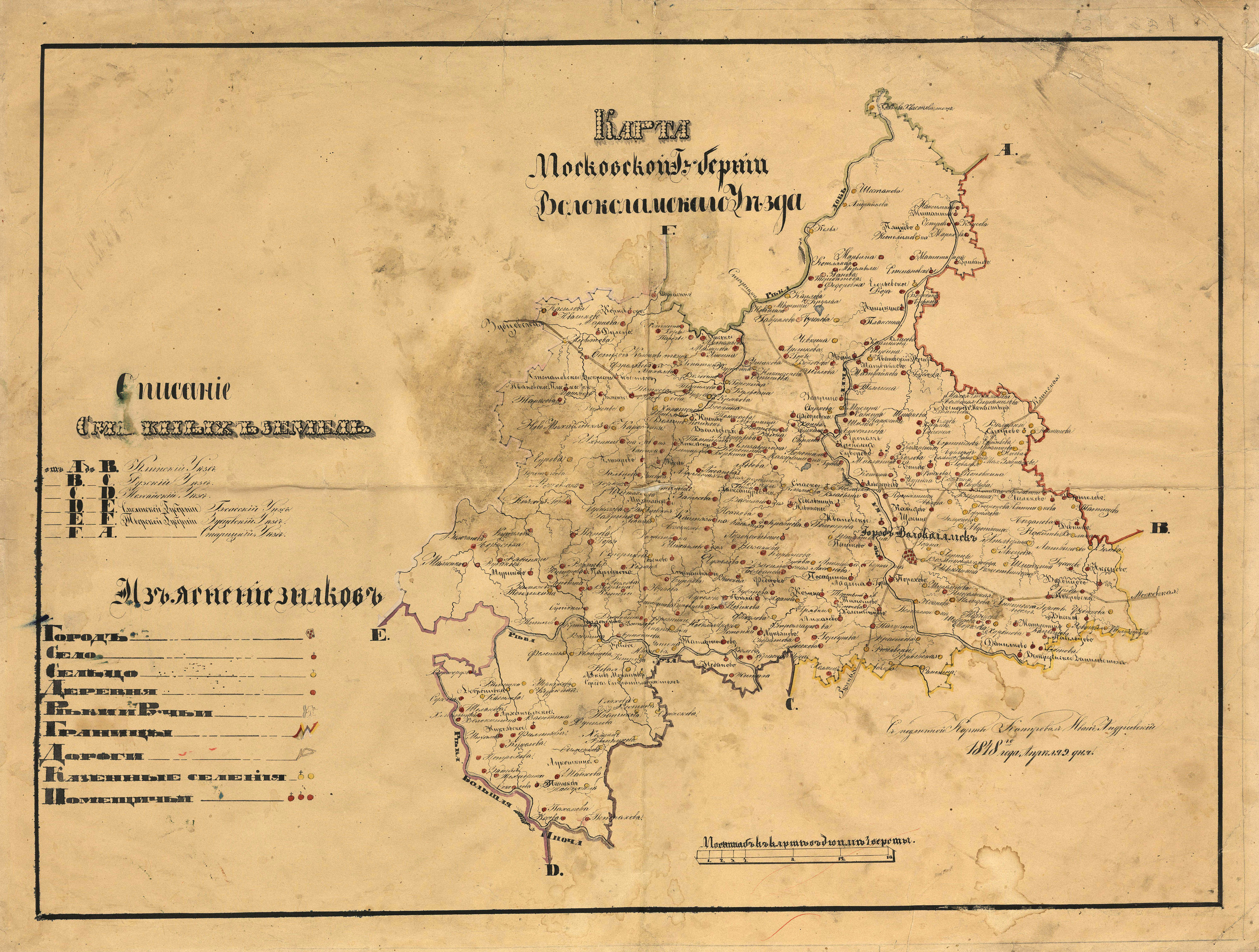
Map of the Volokolamsky Uyezd of the Moscow province, 1848.

Volokolamsky Uyezd (Волоколамский уезд) was one of the subdivisions of the Moscow Governorate of the Russian Empire. It was situated in the northwestern part of the governorate. Its administrative centre was Volokolamsk.

== Demographics ==
At the time of the Russian Empire Census of 1897, Volokolamsky Uyezd had a population of 80,984. Of these, 99.9% spoke Russian as their native language.
