= Shakhovskoy District =

Shakhovskoy District Шаховской район (Russian)
- District
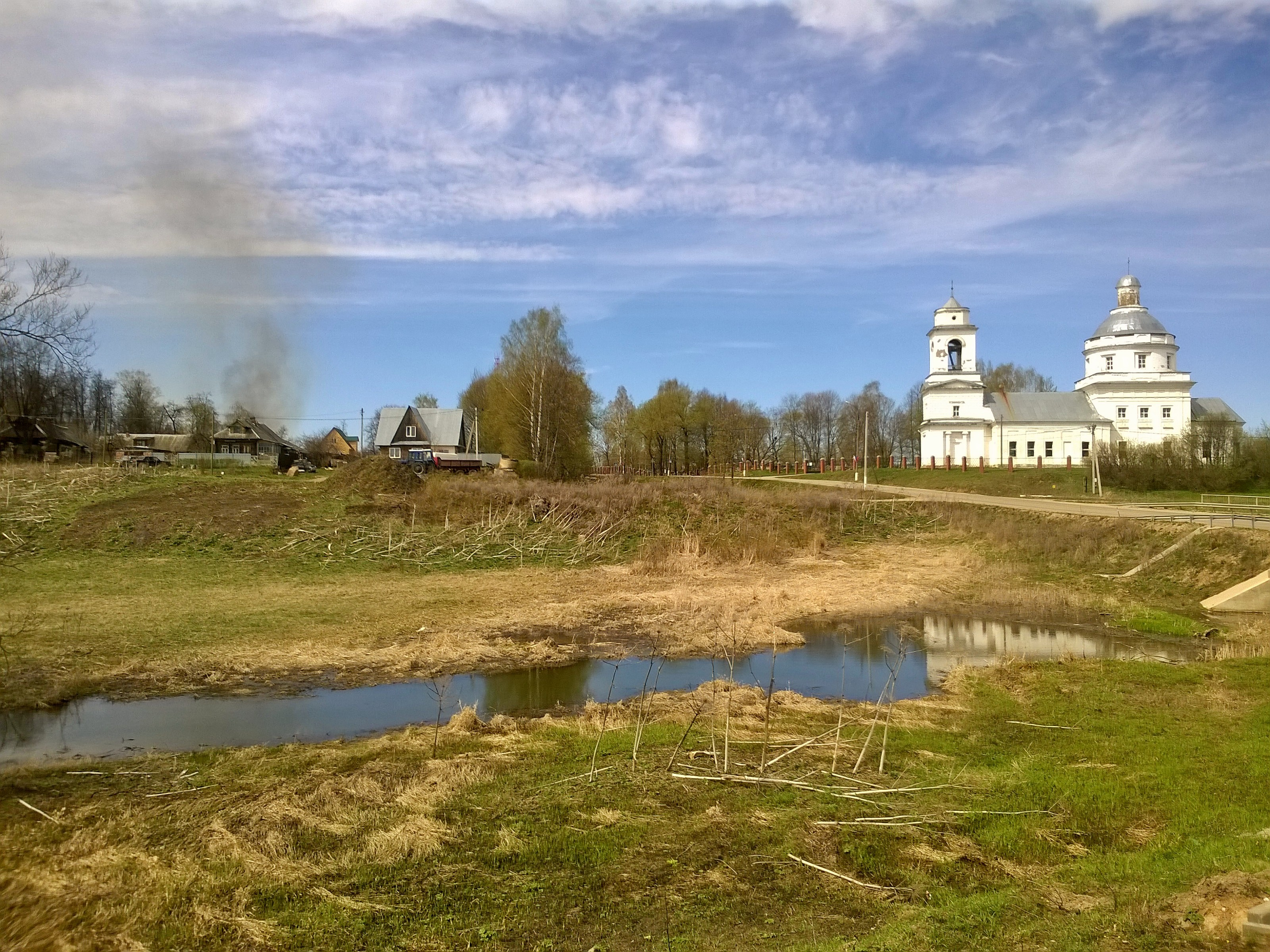
- Village Belaya Kolp, Shakhovskoy District

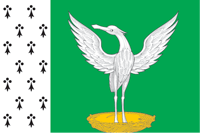
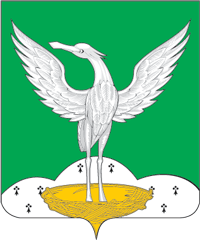
- Flag Coat of arms
- Location of Shakhovskoy District in Moscow Oblast (before July 2012)
- Coordinates: 56°01′58″N 35°30′31″E
- Country: Russia
- Federal subject: Moscow Oblast
- Administrative center: Shakhovskaya

Area
  - Total: 1,218.88 km^{2} (470.61 sq mi)

Population (2010 Census)
  - Total: 25,372
  - Density: 20.816/km^{2} (53.913/sq mi)
  - Urban: 42.3%
  - Rural: 57.7%

Administrative structure
  - Administrative divisions: 1 Work settlements, 3 Rural settlements
  - Inhabited localities: 1 urban-type settlements, 151 rural localities

Municipal structure
  - Municipally incorporated as: Shakhovskoy Municipal District
  - Municipal divisions: 1 urban settlements, 3 rural settlements
- Time zone: UTC+3 (MSK)
- OKTMO ID: 46787000
- Website: http://pgt-mo.com/

Shakhovskoy District (Russian: Шаховско́й райо́н) is an administrative and municipal district (raion), one of the thirty-six in Moscow Oblast, Russia. It is located in the west of the oblast. The area of the district is 1,218.88 square kilometers (470.61 sq mi). Its administrative center is the urban locality (a work settlement) of Shakhovskaya. Population: 25,372 (2010 Census); 23,061 (2002 census); 23,783 (1989 Soviet census). The population of Shakhovskaya accounts for 42.3% of the district's total population.

== Notable residents ==
- Leonīds Breikšs (1908–1942), Latvian poet, born in Yelizarovo village
