= Odintsovo constituency =

Legislative constituency in Russia

Odintsovo single-member constituency
- Constituency of the Russian State Duma
- Deputy: Denis Maydanov; United Russia
- Federal subject: Moscow Oblast
- Districts: Krasnoznamensk, Molodyozhny, Naro-Fominsk, Odintsovo, Ruza, Vlasikha
- Voters: 579,916 (2026)

The Odintsovo constituency (No.124 (Note: No.111 in 1993-1995 and 2003-2007, No. 110 in 1995-2003, No.122 in 2016–2026)) is a Russian legislative constituency in Moscow Oblast. The constituency covers western Moscow Oblast, including inner and outer Moscow suburbs Naro-Fominsk, Odintsovo, Ruza and Zvenigorod. In 1993–2007 the constituency also included voters from Baikonur.

The constituency has been represented since 2021 by United Russia deputy Denis Maydanov, an estrada singer and songwriter, who won the open seat, succeeding one-term United Russia incumbent Oksana Pushkina.

== Boundaries ==
1993–1995: Domodedovo, Domodedovsky District, Leninsky District, Odintsovo, Odintsovsky District, Ruzsky District, Vidnoye, Zvenigorod
The constituency inner Moscow suburbs to the west, south-west and south of the city, including the cities Domodedovo, Odintsovo, Vidnoye and Zvenigorod as well as outer western suburban Ruzsky District.

1995–2007: Krasnoznamensk, Leninsky District, Lytkarino, Odintsovsky District, Ruzsky District, Zvenigorod
The constituency was significantly altered following the 1995 redistricting, losing Domodedovo and Domodedovsky District to new Serpukhov constituency and gaining Lytkarino from Lyubertsy constituency.

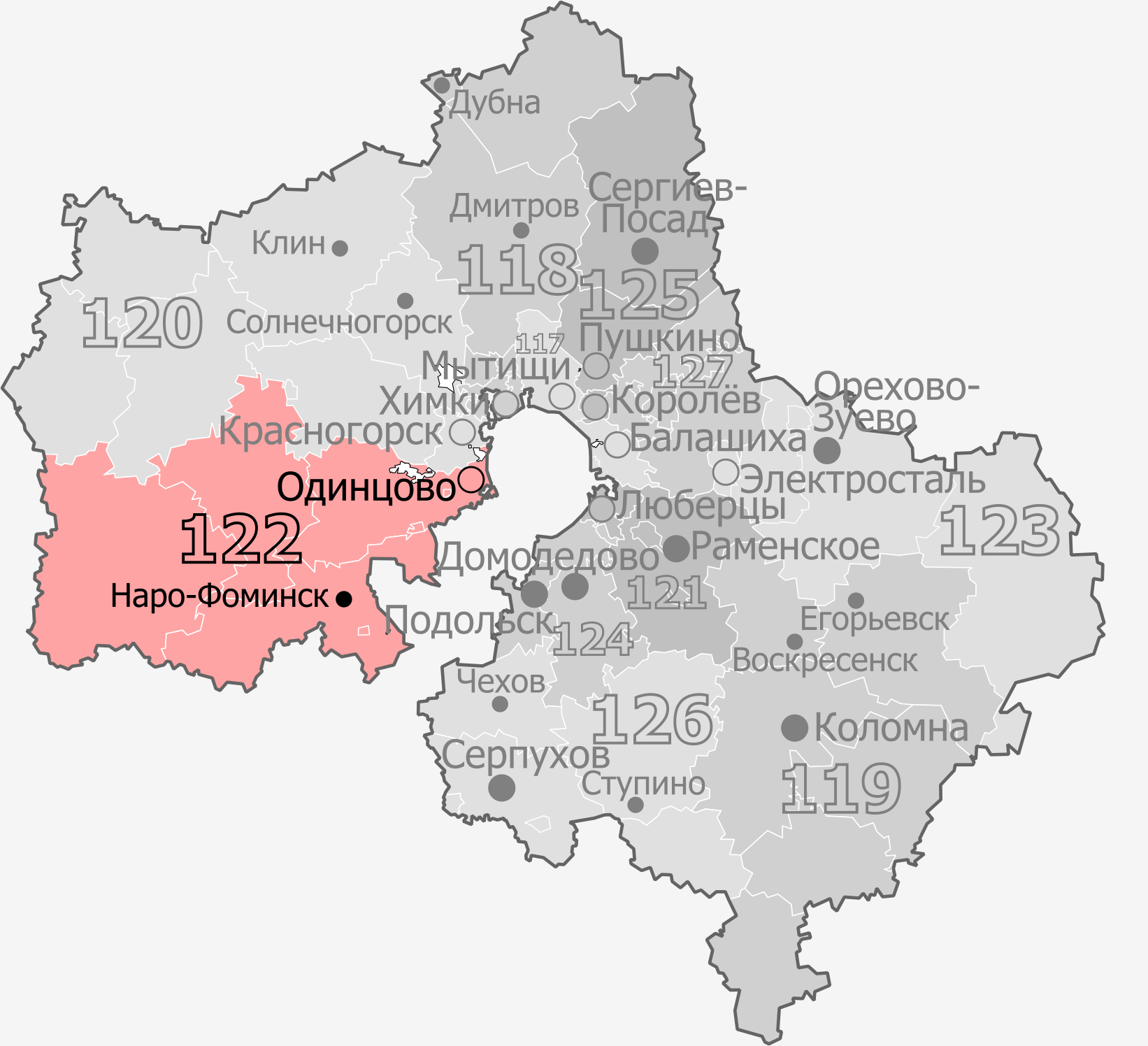
Constituency boundaries from 2016 to 2026

2016–2026: Krasnoznamensk, Molodyozhny, Mozhaysk, Naro-Fominsk, Odintsovo, Ruza, Vlasikha, Zvenigorod
The constituency was re-created for the 2016 election and retained only its western portion, including Odintsovo, Ruza and Zvenigorod, while Lytkarino and eastern Leninsky District were placed into Podolsk constituency (western Leninsky District was absorbed by Moscow in 2012 as part of New Moscow and placed into New Moscow constituency). This seat instead gained western outer suburbs of Moscow: Naro-Fominsk from Podolsk constituency and Mozhaysk from Istra constituency.

2026–present: Krasnoznamensk, Molodyozhny, Naro-Fominsk, Odintsovo, Ruza, Vlasikha
After the 2025 redistricting the constituency was slightly changed, only losing Mozhaysk to Krasnogorsk constituency.

== Members elected ==
Election	Member	Party
1993	Vladimir Lukin	Yavlinsky–Boldyrev–Lukin
1995	Yevgeny Sobakin	Yabloko
1999	A by-election was scheduled after Against all line received the most votes	
2000	Viktor Alksnis	Independent
2003	Viktor Alksnis	Great Russia – Eurasian Union
2007	Proportional representation - no election by constituency	
2011	Proportional representation - no election by constituency	
2016	Oksana Pushkina	United Russia
2021	Denis Maydanov	United Russia
2026	Denis Maydanov	United Russia

== Election results ==
=== 1993 ===
Summary of the 12 December 1993 Russian legislative election in the Odintsovo constituency
Candidate	Party	Votes	%
Vladimir Lukin	Yavlinsky–Boldyrev–Lukin	47,996	16.18%
Andrey Belogurov	Choice of Russia	30,305	10.22%
Aleksey Mitrofanov	Liberal Democratic Party	30,073	10.14%
Viktor Kurentsov	Independent	25,062	8.45%
Pyotr Ryabtsev	Agrarian Party	22,170	7.47%
Vladimir Vakhania	Independent	20,749	7.00%
Boris Mayorov	Russian Democratic Reform Movement	19,396	6.54%
Viktor Shevelukha	Communist Party	13,671	4.61%
Sergey Plekhanov	Civic Union	8,727	2.94%
against all		59,435	20.04%
Total		296,618	100%

=== 1995 ===
Summary of the 17 December 1995 Russian legislative election in the Odintsovo constituency
Candidate	Party	Votes	%
Yevgeny Sobakin	Yabloko	60,577	17.76%
Yury Gusev	Independent	33,639	9.86%
Viktor Chibisov	Independent	33,329	9.77%
Vitaly Lysov	Communists and Working Russia - for the Soviet Union	30,661	8.99%
Viktor Alksnis	Independent	29,105	8.54%
Vyacheslav Moslakov	Independent	25,333	7.43%
Aleksey Mikhaylov	Forward, Russia!	14,408	4.23%
Dmitry Valigursky	Democratic Choice of Russia – United Democrats	14,300	4.19%
Aleksey Mitrofanov	Liberal Democratic Party	13,158	3.86%
Nikolay Nikolayev	Congress of Russian Communities	12,859	3.77%
Anatoly Larin	Stable Russia	8,224	2.41%
against all		56,840	16.67%
Total		341,006	100%

=== 1999 ===
A by-election was scheduled after Against all line received the most votes.

Summary of the 19 December 1999 Russian legislative election in the Odintsovo constituency
Candidate	Party	Votes	%
Yevgeny Sobakin (incumbent)	Yabloko	53,115	16.44%
Viktor Alksnis	Russian All-People's Union	52,692	16.31%
Vitaly Lysov	Communist Party	25,783	7.98%
Vasily Popov	Unity	22,461	6.95%
Viktor Averin	Independent	17,996	5.57%
Tatyana Andreyeva	Socialist Party	9,974	3.09%
Aleksandr Gornov	Liberal Democratic Party	9,371	2.90%
Fyodor Burlatsky	Union of Right Forces	9,313	2.88%
Aleksandr Galkin	Our Home – Russia	7,863	2.43%
Viktor Shchekochikhin	Independent	7,628	2.36%
Andrey Brezhnev	Independent	7,598	2.35%
Viktor Pronin	Congress of Russian Communities-Yury Boldyrev Movement	4,718	1.46%
Yevgeny Mititel	Party of Pensioners	4,333	1.34%
Aleksandr Malov	Independent	3,786	1.17%
Vladimir Miloserdov	Russian Party	3,719	1.15%
Yevgeny Milashchenko	Independent	2,588	0.80%
Oleg Savin	Spiritual Heritage	2,215	0.69%
Aleksandr Shapovalov	Independent	1,948	0.60%
Igor Obukhov	Independent	1,360	0.42%
against all		64,843	20.07%
Total		323,128	100%

=== 2000 ===
Summary of the 26 March 2000 by-election in the Odintsovo constituency
Candidate	Party	Votes	%
Viktor Alksnis	Independent	83,089	23.76%
Yevgeny Sobakin	Independent	67,718	19.36%
Viktor Averin	Independent	37,559	10.74%
Vladimir Ivanov	Independent	17,273	4.94%
Nikolay Babkin	Independent	11,468	3.28%
Tatyana Igumenova	Independent	10,646	3.04%
Nikolay Moskovchenko	Independent	7,862	2.25%
Vladimir Miloserdov	Independent	5,703	1.63%
Gennady Ryzhenko	Independent	5,574	1.59%
Gennady Benov	Independent	5,479	1.57%
Gennady Krylov	Independent	5,110	1.46%
Yury Kara	Independent	4,414	1.26%
Vladimir Vakhaniya	Independent	4,074	1.16%
Andrey Kashelkin	Independent	2,559	0.73%
Yevgeny Tarlo	Independent	2,230	0.64%
Sergey Pavlyuk	Independent	2,191	0.63%
Zagalav Nurudinov	Independent	1,742	0.50%
against all		64,872	18.55%
Total		349,701	100%

=== 2003 ===
Summary of the 7 December 2003 Russian legislative election in the Odintsovo constituency
Candidate	Party	Votes	%
Viktor Alksnis (incumbent)	Great Russia – Eurasian Union	68,582	24.47%
Nikolay Kovalyov	United Russia	57,237	20.42%
Vladimir Lukin	Yabloko	35,717	12.74%
Yevgeny Sobakin	Party of Russia's Rebirth-Russian Party of Life	18,350	6.55%
Natalya Sokolkova	United Russian Party Rus'	13,469	4.81%
Yevgeny Tarasov	Agrarian Party	6,503	2.32%
Maksim Rokhmistrov	Liberal Democratic Party	6,241	2.23%
Vladimir Vakhaniya	Independent	5,121	1.83%
Vladimir Guzhva	Development of Enterprise	3,007	1.07%
Stanislav Sindrevich	Independent	1,601	0.57%
Igor Krutovykh	Independent	1,355	0.48%
Aleksey Volynets	Independent	1,350	0.48%
against all		55,653	19.85%
Total		281,254	100%

=== 2016 ===
Summary of the 18 September 2016 Russian legislative election in the Odintsovo constituency
Candidate	Party	Votes	%
Oksana Pushkina	United Russia	95,812	45.02%
Vladimir Chuvilin	Communist Party	21,389	10.05%
Yury Spirin	Liberal Democratic Party	20,974	9.85%
Viktor Alksnis	A Just Russia	19,882	9.34%
Sergey Artemov	Communists of Russia	11,979	5.63%
Sergey Astashov	The Greens	10,066	4.73%
Aleksey Korolev	Rodina	8,177	3.84%
Yaroslav Svyatoslavsky	People's Freedom Party	7,309	3.43%
Vyacheslav Savinov	Patriots of Russia	5,130	2.41%
Fyodor Tsekhmistrenko	Civic Platform	1,234	0.58%
Total		212,831	100%

=== 2021 ===
Summary of the 17-19 September 2021 Russian legislative election in the Odintsovo constituency
Candidate	Party	Votes	%
Denis Maydanov	United Russia	102,124	40.39%
Sergey Tenyayev	Communist Party	48,189	19.06%
Dmitry Parkhomenko	Liberal Democratic Party	16,468	6.51%
Fyodor Stepanov	Communists of Russia	16,317	6.45%
Aleksandr Kumokhin	A Just Russia — For Truth	16,177	6.40%
Ruslan Kalimullin	New People	12,913	5.11%
Zhaudat Khanafiyev	Party of Pensioners	8,032	3.18%
Aleksey Dulenkov	Yabloko	7,328	2.90%
Vladimir Sheryagin	Rodina	5,873	2.32%
Artur Sukyazyan	The Greens	4,708	1.86%
Total		252,815	100%

=== 2026 ===
Summary of the 18-20 September 2026 Russian legislative election in the Odintsovo constituency
Candidate	Party	Votes	%
Denis Maydanov (incumbent)	United Russia	180,484	57.57%
Konstantin Chmarov	Communist Party	38,527	12.29%
Mikhail Zuyev	New People	33,976	10.84%
Konstantin Kravchuk	Liberal Democratic Party	22,914	7.31%
Vadim Popov	A Just Russia	18,172	5.80%
Dmitry Shatalov	Party of Pensioners	12,993	4.14%
Total		313,488	100%
