= Vlasikha, Moscow Oblast =

Vlasikha Власиха
- Work settlement
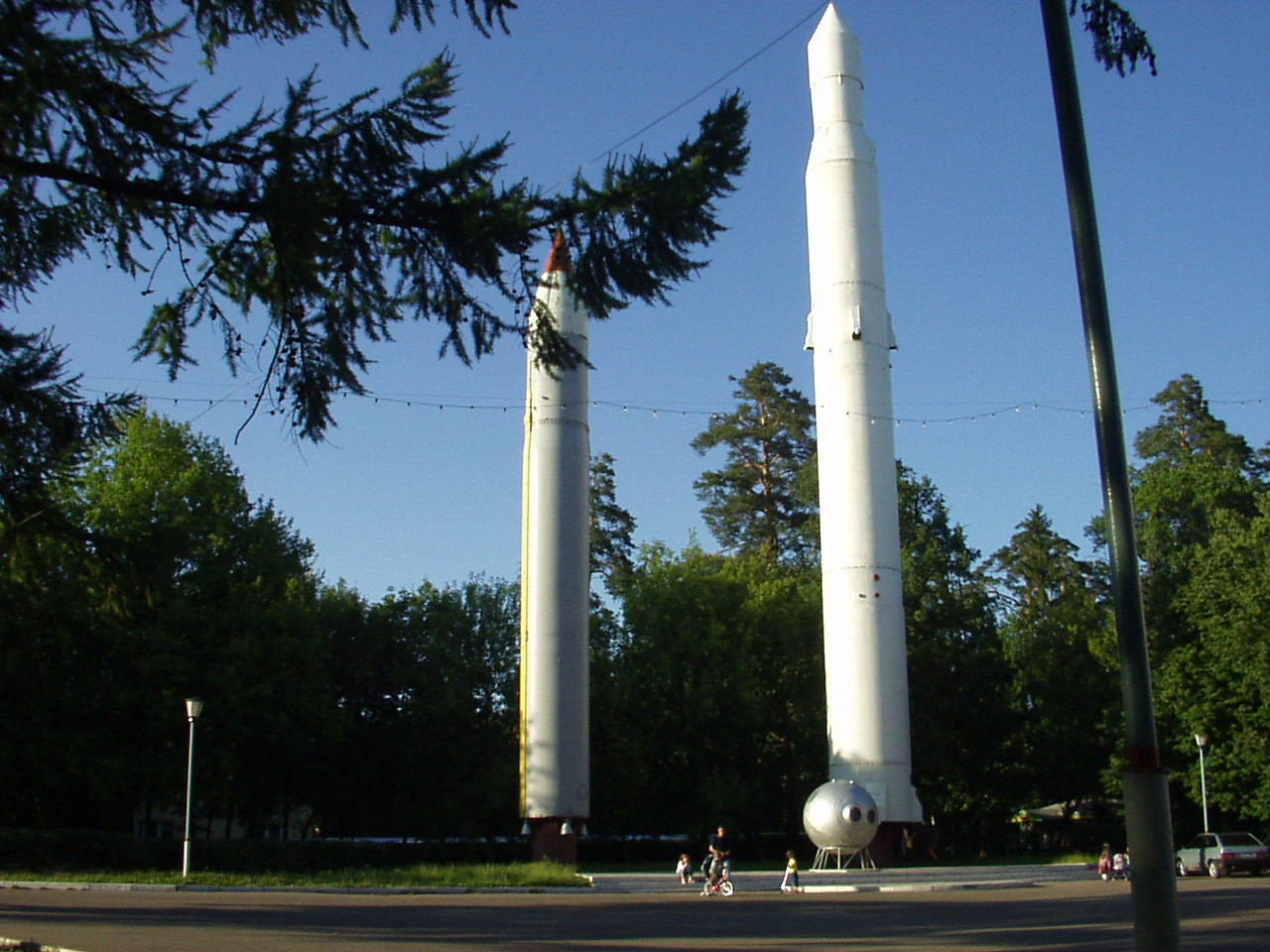
- Central square in Vlasikha

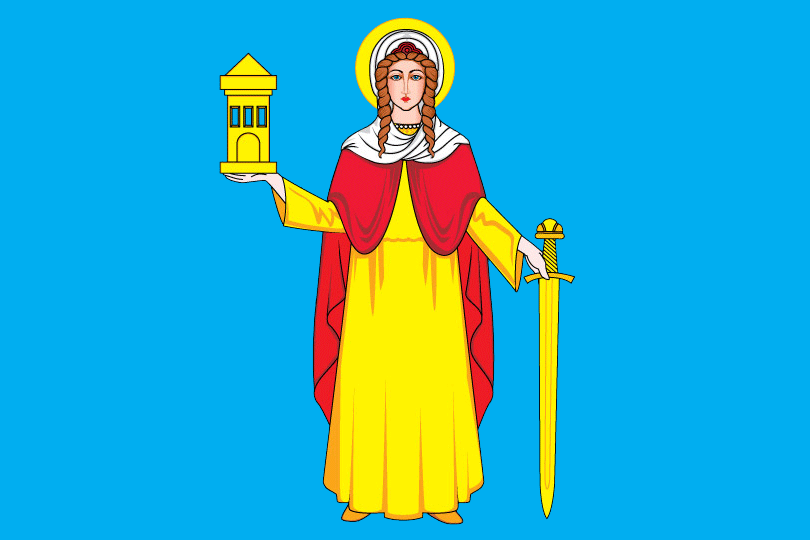
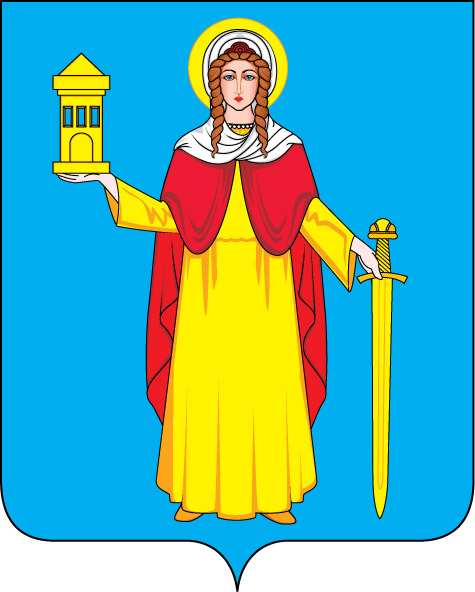
- Flag Coat of arms
- Interactive map of Vlasikha
- Location of Vlasikha Vlasikha (Moscow Oblast)
- Coordinates: 55°41′06″N 37°11′30″E
- Country: Russia
- Federal subject: Moscow Oblast
- First mentioned: 1646
- Urban-type settlement status since: August 5, 2009
- Elevation: 190 m (620 ft)

Population (2010 Census)
  - Total: 26,359
  - Estimate (2023): 28,401 (+7.7%)

Administrative status
  - Subordinated to: closed administrative-territorial formation of Vlasikha
  - Capital of: closed administrative-territorial formation of Vlasikha

Municipal status
  - Urban okrug: Vlasikha Urban Okrug
  - Capital of: Vlasikha Urban Okrug
- Time zone: UTC+3 (MSK)
- Postal code: 143010
- Dialing codes: +7 495, 498
- OKTMO ID: 46773000051
- Website: vlasiha-zato.ru

Vlasikha (Russian: Вла́сиха) is a closed urban locality (a work settlement) in Moscow Oblast, Russia. It serves as the headquarters of the Strategic Missile Troops of Russia. Population: 28,240 (2021 census); 26,359 (2010 census);

== History ==
It was first mentioned in the 17th century as the village of Kostino. In 1646, this was the votchina of the widow A. Pushkina. One kholop lived in the estate, and in 9 peasant households there were 30 male souls. The Tsar's father-in-law, boyar Kirill Naryshkin, bought this estate from the Pushkins. By 1678 the village began to be called the Seltso of Kostino. In it and in the neighboring village of Lapino at that time there were 15 peasant households and 55 men.

At the end of the 18th century, the village of Vlasikha was mentioned in the possession of the Moldavian native Prince Alexander Mavrocordatos Firaris. There were 19 male and 25 female souls in 6 households. The manor's two-story wooden house on a stone foundation, with a garden with fruit trees, and a “rusted” mill about one stand are noted.

According to information from 1852, the village was owned by the collegiate assessor Abram Petrovich Khvoshchinsky and there were 23 men and 26 women in his 8 households. In 1890, 63 residents lived here.

In 1928, the leadership of the Red Army decided to organize the Vaccine and Serum Laboratory of the Military Sanitary Directorate of the Red Army, which was engaged in the creation of vaccines and serums for the needs of the army. The laboratory was established by 1930 on the territory of the summer house of the former tea merchant Wahau. On April 16, 1933, the laboratory was reorganized into the Military Scientific Medical Institute of the Red Army, which in 1934 was renamed the Biotechnical Institute of the Red Army. The institute operated in Vlasikha until 1937.

In October 1941, the headquarters of the Western Front was deployed in Vlasikha, from which its commander, Georgy Zhukov, led the defense of Moscow.

In 1958, a command complex with a 4-tier bunker and a residence began to be built in Vlasikha. On January 15, 1960, the Minister of Defense of the USSR, Marshal Rodion Malinovsky signed an order “On the deployment of control bodies of the Commander-in-Chief of the Missile Forces” which ordered: “The main headquarters and directorates of the Commander-in-Chief of the Missile Forces should be located in Perkhushkovo (32 km west of Moscow) on the funds of the military town 22/1".

In 1986, in Vlasikha they began to build a new 12-tier bunker two kilometers from the old one.

In modern Russia, the headquarters of the Strategic Rocket Forces is located in Vlasikha.

By decree of the President of Russia of January 19, 2009 A closed administrative-territorial formation was established on the territory of the closed military townlet #22/1 on January 19, 2009. The ZATO also included the Shkolny microdistrict in the village of Yudino. On June 7, 2009, the first elections of deputies of the Council and the Head of the urban district were held in the Vlasikha urban district. The head of the city district, O. V. Agafonova, and 15 deputies of the Council of Deputies were elected

On August 5, 2009, Boris Gromov, the Governor of Moscow Oblast, issued a Resolution which transformed the military townlet into an urban-type settlement. On October 29, the urban-type settlement was named "Vlasikha".

== Administrative and municipal status ==
Within the framework of administrative divisions, it is incorporated as the closed administrative-territorial formation of Vlasikha—an administrative unit with the status equal to that of the districts. As a municipal division, the closed administrative-territorial formation of Vlasikha is incorporated as Vlasikha Urban Okrug.
