= Denis Maydanov =

Russian musician and politician (born 1976)

- Денис Майдaнов
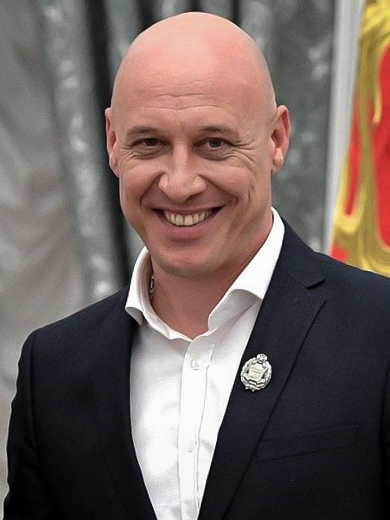
- Maydanov in 2017

Member of the State Duma for Moscow Oblast
- Incumbent
- Assumed office 12 October 2021
- Preceded by: Oksana Pushkina
- Constituency: Odintsovo (No. 122)

Personal details
- Born: 17 February 1976 (age 50) Balakovo, Saratov Oblast, Russian SFSR, USSR
- Party: United Russia
- Spouse: Natalya Kolesnikova
- Children: 2
- Education: Moscow State Art and Cultural University
- Occupation: Musician
- Awards: Merited Artist of the Russian Federation; Golden Gramophone; Song of the Year
- Website: Musical act Political office

Denis Vasilyevich Maydanov (Russian: Денис Васильевич Майдaнов, born 17 February 1976) is a Russian singer, songwriter, actor, and politician. An accomplished artist known throughout Russia, Maydanov also serves in the Russian State Duma as a representative of the Odintsovo constituency of Odintsovsky District, Moscow Oblast since 2021. He is a member of United Russia. Maydanov's accolades as an artist include the title of People's Artist of Russia, as well as the Golden Gramophone, song of the year, and chanson of the year. In his political career, Maydanov has vocally supported the policies of Vladimir Putin, and supported the invasion of Ukraine. In 2022 he was sanctioned by the European Union.

== Early life and education ==
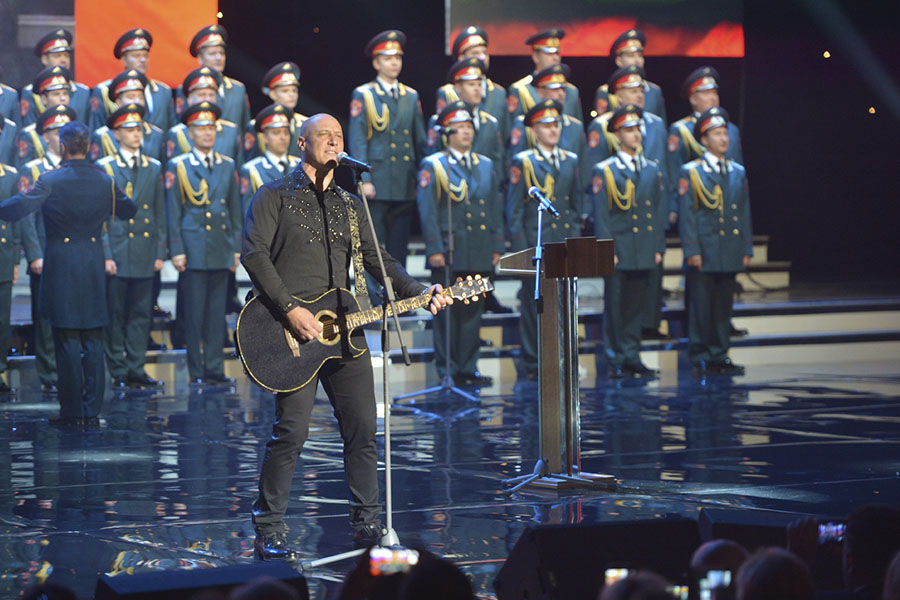
Maydanov performing with a military band in a concert for members of the Main Military Medical Directorate on Medical Worker Day in 2018.

Denis Maydanov was born on February 17, 1976, in the city of Balakovo, Saratov Region, to a family of petrochemical workers. His father was born in the Mogilev Region of Belarus, but moved to Balakovo in the Saratov oblast of southwest Russia to work as an engineer in the state petrochemical industry. Maydanov's mother, Evgenia Petrovna, was born in the suburbs of Luhansk, in the Donbas region of Ukraine; when she moved to Balakavo at the age of 20 she worked as an inspector in Saratovgasstroy, later as head of the personnel department in Zhilstroy. When Denis was eight, his parents divorced, leaving Denis to be raised by his single mother. At an early age he was forced to work to provide for the two of them: when he was 13 years old he worked as a janitor, security guard in a kindergarten, and washed cars.

By the time of his parents divorce at the age of eight, Maydanov had already begun composing poetry: he wrote his first poems to his mother for International Women's Day. At 13, he learned to play guitar from a neighbor. At that point, he stopped playing the bayan, which he had studied at music school, and began to write his own songs. Alongside the guitar lessons, Maydanov taught himself the piano, and began to get involved in the poetic and theatrical circles of the Balakovo House of Culture, taking part in the vocal-instrumental ensemble. In 1992, at the age of 16, he earned third place at a city competition of variety art with a performance of his own song. As a result, Maydanov secured a spot among the young performers of the studio "MUZ-A" at the city's House of Creativity, and learned to become a songwriter for soloists. Since then he has maintained his affiliation with the House of Creativity, as head of the VIA, methodologist, and head of the "Club of High School Students". In school Denis was successful, but after his ninth year he was forced to drop out and enter a chemical technical college in order to provide for himself and his mother.

While studying at the technical school, the future artist decided to enter the Moscow State Art and Cultural University (MGUKI); he studied at the evening school in parallel with the technical school with the intention to receive a certificate a year earlier before the official deadline. In 1995, when he succeeded, Denis entered the correspondence department of MGUKI in the specialty "Manager-director of show programs"; At admission he had significant competition – 72 people for 6 seats. In MGUKI he studied directing and acting. In parallel to his studies Maydanov worked; first at a car-wash, then his mother managed to arrange him a job as a repairman-fitter at the Syzran oil refinery. Despite the good salary, Denis left the factory after a year of work, realizing that this is not his profession. Also during this period he directed the VIA and theater studio in the Balakovo House of Creativity; There was a recording studio which Denis used to record his first songs and for subsequently selling them to local Volga musicians. He graduated from MGUKI in 1999, afterward becoming director of the musical theater and the head of the music department of the House of Creativity.

== Musical career ==
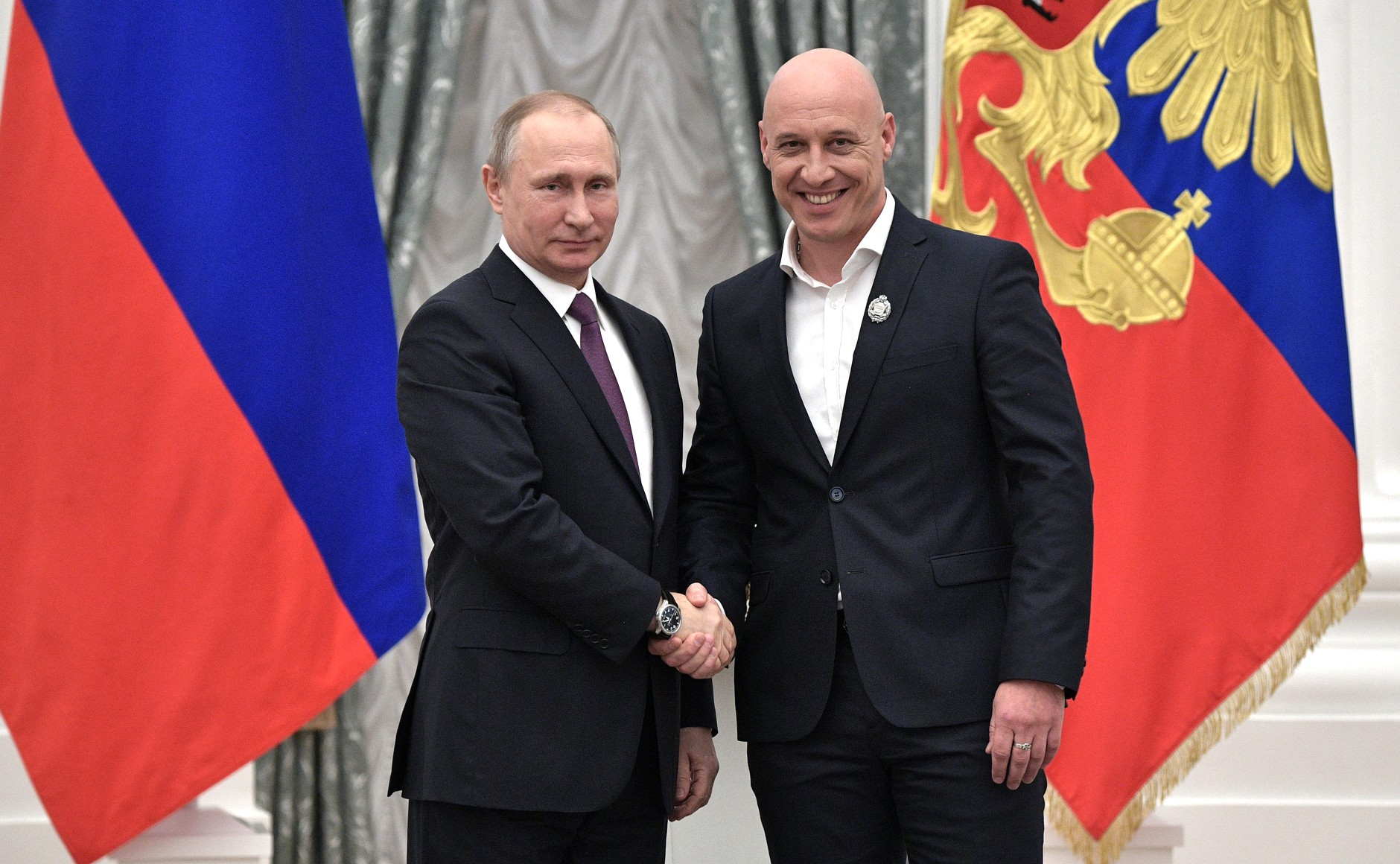
Vladimir Putin bestowing the title Meritorious Artist of the Russian Federation on Maydanov in 2017

In 2001, Maydanov moved from Balakovo to Moscow, working as a composer-songwriter for other Russian performers. In his first two years living in Moscow, Maydanov had little stable earnings or housing, moving more than 15 times, and couch surfing with friends from college, sometimes sleeping at railway and metro stations. His first significant earnings (US$150) came from producer Yuri Aizenshpis for writing the lyrics to the song "Behind the Fog" for singer Sasha Gradiva. The song became a hit, winning the "Song of the Year 2002" festival, and bringing Maydanov his first musical award. Gradually Maydanov received recognition, and many Russian artists began singing his songs, in particular, Nikolai Baskov, Filipp Kirkorov, Turetsky Choir Art Group, Alexander Buinov, Mikhail Shufutinsky, Aleksandr Marshal, Lolita Milyavskaya, Jasmin, Joseph Kobzon, Tatiana Bulanova. He also wrote songs and soundtracks for a number of Russian films and serials.

In 2008 Maydanov switched from songwriting to recording and performing his own songs. After being commissioned by the president of AvtoRadio Alexander Varin to write "This radio is Avtoradio", Varin invited Maydanov to put the song "Eternal Love" on the air, insisting that Maydanov should start his own performing career. Within six months of debut, the track made the rotation of major Russian radio stations, and the song would go on to earn Maydanov the Golden Gramophone. "Eternal Love" was Maydanov's first hit, and remains among his most famous songs. In June 2009, he released his first album "I'll Know That You Love Me ... Eternal Love", and soon after appeared on stage as a solo artist for the first time at the Moscow International House of Music. Over the next decade he would go on to release albums "World for rent" (2011), "Flying over us" (2013), "Flag of my state" (2015), "Half a lifetime on the road: Unreleased" (2015), and "What will the wind leave" (2017).

In October 2013, Maydanov joined a group of Russian performers who participated – at the invitation of Defense Minister Sergey Shoygu – in the new performance of the National anthem of Russia. Along with Maydanov, Valeriya, Oleg Gazmanov, Larisa Dolina, Aleksandr Marshal, Jasmin, Alsou, Dina Garipova, Vitas and other artists took part in the recording

In 2017, he was given the honorific Merited Artist of the Russian Federation.

On April 12, 2021, in honor of the 60th anniversary of Yuri Gagarin's flight to space, audioservice Sberzvuk and Roscosmos included tracks from Maydanov among a playlist of music sent to orbiting International Space Station cosmonauts Sergei Kud-Sverchkov and Oleg Novitsky, accompanied by a personal note from Maydanov and each of the other artists.

May 1, 2022, Maydanov and other acts such as folk-rocker Pelageya performed at a Putin-backed concert.

=== Musical themes ===
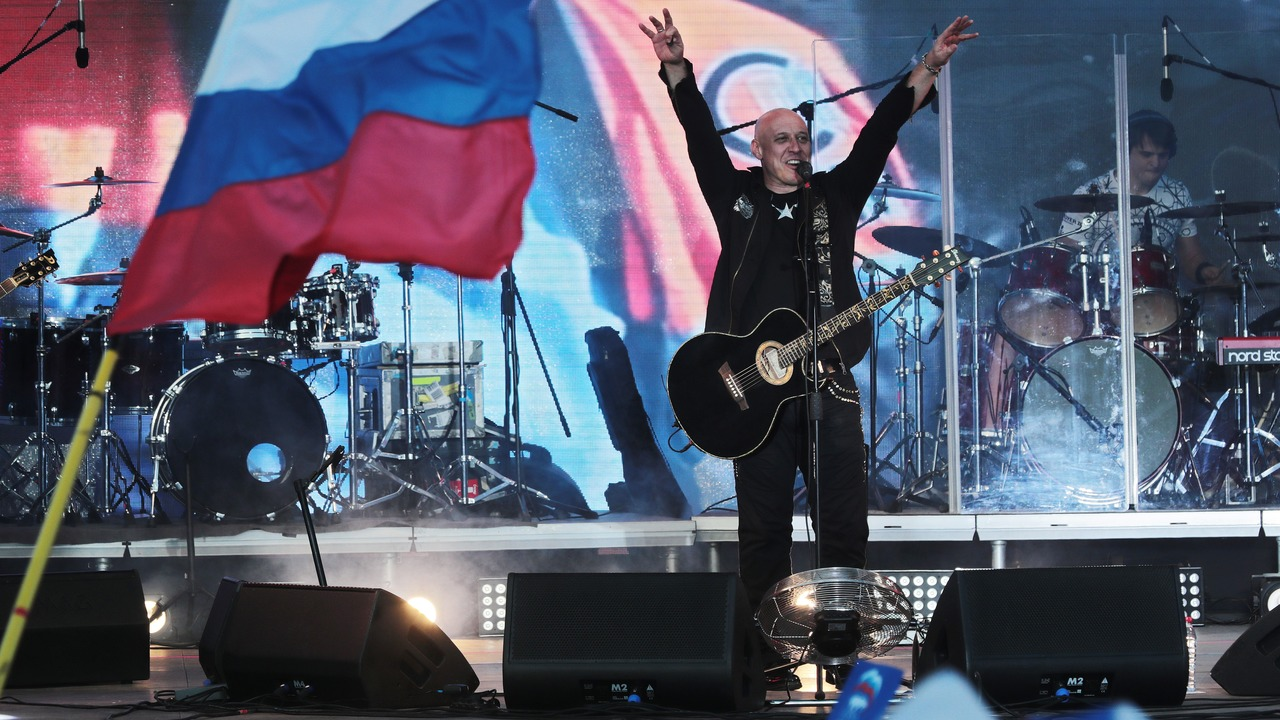
Maydanov performing in Simferopol.

Many of Maydanov's songs feature Russian nationalist and irredentist themes, with several songs about the VDV, OMON, and Spetsnaz, and corresponding music videos which feature soldiers and equipment of the units performing tactical demonstrations. He has performed on many occasions for Russian troops and national pride events, including at the Kremlin. When asked whether the values he espouses in his music would carry over to his political career, Maydanov told Gazeta.Ru:

"many of my songs are of a patriotic and social nature, which is an important cultural contribution to the country's ideological agenda."

In January and June 2016, Maydanov held concerts for Russian servicemen at Khmeimim Air Base in Syria. In 2019 he performed on Lenin Square in Simferopol, at a concert in the Crimean city to commemorate the fifth anniversary of the Annexation of Crimea by the Russian Federation. In the 2021 music video for the song Spetsnaz, Maydanov sings that "Spetsnaz operates from Moscow to New York", while surrounded by FSB officers and Russian soldiers. His December 2022 release Sarmatushka celebrates the RS-28 Sarmat missile with the lyrics, "Its will is stronger than the Ural Mountains/It’ll scatter our enemies to dust in an instant/It’s ready to carry out the sentence/The U.S.’s air defense is no hindrance to it.”

== Political career ==
Maydanov was politically active prior to beginning his own political career, having been a member of the All-Russia Popular Front, a winner of the Russian FSB Prize and Prize of the Ministry of Defense of the Russian Federation in the field of culture and art, and a reported confidante of President Vladimir Putin. He is also Deputy Chairman of the Public Council within the Ministry of Culture, and a member of the Cultural Council of the Rosgvardia Russian Army ensemble.

=== State Duma ===
In March 2021, Maydanov announced his decision to run for the State Duma in the 122nd Odintsovo single-mandate district of the Moscow Oblast, as a member of the incumbent United Russia party. After prevailing in the internal party primaries in May, he was officially registered as the party's candidate on July 29. In the elections held September 17–19, 2021, he received a majority of votes - 40.39% (102,124 votes), ahead of Communist Party candidate Sergei Tenyaev (19.06%).

On September 22, 2021, Maydanov attended the inauguration of Aleksey Dyumin, following his re-election for a second term as governor of Tula Oblast.

==== Committees ====
Upon taking office Maydanov was assigned to the State Duma Committee on Culture as First Deputy Chairman of the committee.

==== Legislation ====
In 2021, Maydanov proposed legislation to enshrine Father's Day as a holiday across the Russian Federation. Later in the year President Vladimir Putin took up the idea, announcing it would be celebrated on the third Sunday in October. The legislation served to create a de jure day of celebration, though since the early days of the Soviet Union the traditional celebration of Defender of the Fatherland Day on February 23 had been treated as a de facto Father's Day, often referred to as "Man's Day." Separately, 28 of the Russian Republics had already adopted Father's Day as a regional holiday prior to the national legislation.

In 2022 he voted in favor of recognizing the People's Republic of Donetsk and People's Republic of Luhansk as sovereign states, in violation of the Minsk Agreements.

=== Political views ===
==== Putinism ====
Maydanov vocally supports the policies of Russian President Vladimir Putin, describing him as a "strong man and leader." He reportedly became a close confidant of Putin during the Russian leader's 2018 presidential campaign. In an interview in February 2018, he reiterated his support for Putin, describing him as a man who tore Russia out of the devastation of the 1990s and restored order, and saying he would put Putin "on par" with Peter the Great.

In 2012, when Putin ran for a third presidential term, Maydanov participated in two political rallies in support. Three times, in 2013, 2015 and 2017, he spoke to the guests of the international professional combat sambo tournament "Plotform S-70", with Putin – a staple among the tournaments guests – in attendance.

Just before the 2013 federal elections, Maydanov took part in a concert rally in support of Moscow mayoral candidate Sergey Sobyanin at the Sochi Olympic Park.

==== Ukraine ====
===== 2014 annexation =====
Prior to holding political office Maydanov supported Russian irridentist views on Ukraine, calling the 2014 annexation of Crimea the "trajectory of historical justice". He took part in a number of public events in support of Russian policy in Crimea, including a public concert and rally in Moscow in March 2014, and a subsequent appearance in Sevastopol in July. In 2015, Maydanov held a public concert in Donetsk, repeating the event in 2016.

In 2017 Maydanov was barred from entering Ukraine by the Ukrainian government. Despite this, in 2019 he performed on Lenin Square in Simferopol, at a concert in the Crimean city to commemorate the fifth anniversary of the annexation. In 2016, Maydanov served a member of the Eurovision jury from Russia, alongside Anastasia Stotskaya and Oscar Kuchera. He condemned the refusal of the Ukrainian authorities to allow Russian representative Yulia Samoilova to enter the Eurovision Song Contest held in Kyiv the following year.

===== 2022 invasion =====
In an editorial for RIA FAN the day before Russia began the invasion of Ukraine in February 2022, Maydanov claimed that "everyone understands that this is primordially Russian land... ..everything up to the Dnieper". In it he also claimed the United States was "provoking Russia" in order to sell weapons to the Ukrainian government, which he predicted would soon collapse.

In a second editorial with the Internet Research Agency released in the hours after the invasion, Maydanov closely echoed the Russian leader's late night televised declaration of war. He claimed the relationship Russia had with Ukraine in 2022 was analogous to when Nazi Germany attacked the Soviet Union in 1941, asserting that Russia was playing the role of the Soviets in the analogy. He echoed Putin's claim that the invasion was a peacekeeping operation for the "demilitarization" and "denazification" of the Jewish-led Ukrainian government, and spoke effusively of Putin's speech announcing the invasion and the speech two days prior recognizing Donetsk and Luhansk as "a kind of charter, a political bible for the future leaders of our state." Despite precipitating unprecedented sanctions and economic ruin, Maydanov called Putin's actions "the standard of how a president should think, how he should take care of his country." In the week following the invasion Maydanov told local outlet Odin.ru that the invasion was necessary to end the "genocide of the people who opposed the [euro]maidan."

When asked about domestic opposition to the war he claimed there was no room for peace activism, saying "to be both a pacifist and a patriot is now simply impossible!" He also told Russia-24 he supports efforts to block access to Facebook, Instagram, and Twitter, and increase controls on VKontakte and Odnoklassniki "for the duration of the special operation" in order to "control misinformation."

In late February 2022, Maydanov was sanctioned by the European Union, part of a comprehensive travel ban and foreign asset seizure package implemented against members of the State Duma who voted to recognize the Ukrainian regions of Donetsk and Luhansk as independent republics in violation of the Minsk agreements, and authorize Russian military intervention.

On March 26, 2022, Maydanov and Roman Razum, leader of the ensemble of the 2nd Army Corps of the Luhansk People's Republic released a collaboration called "Victory is ours" in support of the Russian attack on Ukraine. In April and May 2022, Maydanov participated in a series of concerts organized in order to support the 2022 Russian invasion of Ukraine.

== Personal life ==
Maydanov is married to Natalya Maydanova (née Kolesnikova). Born in Tashkent, Uzbek SSR in 1981, she has acted in his music videos on occasion, and serves as his creative director. The two met when Natalya went to support her friend in an audition for Fabrika Zvyozd ("Star Factory"), an influential televised talent competition which Maydanov was attending. Together they have two children, Vlada, born in 2008, and Borislav, born in 2013. In 2022, Maydanov began performing with 13 year old Vlada, who he says wants to "continue the musical dynasty", predicting she would begin an independent career at age 15.

== Discography ==
- I will know, that you love me... Eternal love (Я буду знать, что ты любишь меня… Вечная любовь) (2009)
- World for rent (Арендованный мир) (2011)
- Flying over us... (Пролетая над нами…) (2014)
- Flag of my nation (Флаг моего государства) (2015)
- Half of life on the road... Unpublished (Полжизни в пути… Неизданное) (2015)
- What wind leaves (Что оставит ветер) (2017)
