= Snezhnogorsk, Murmansk Oblast =

Town in Murmansk Oblast, Russia

Snezhnogorsk Снежногорск
- Town
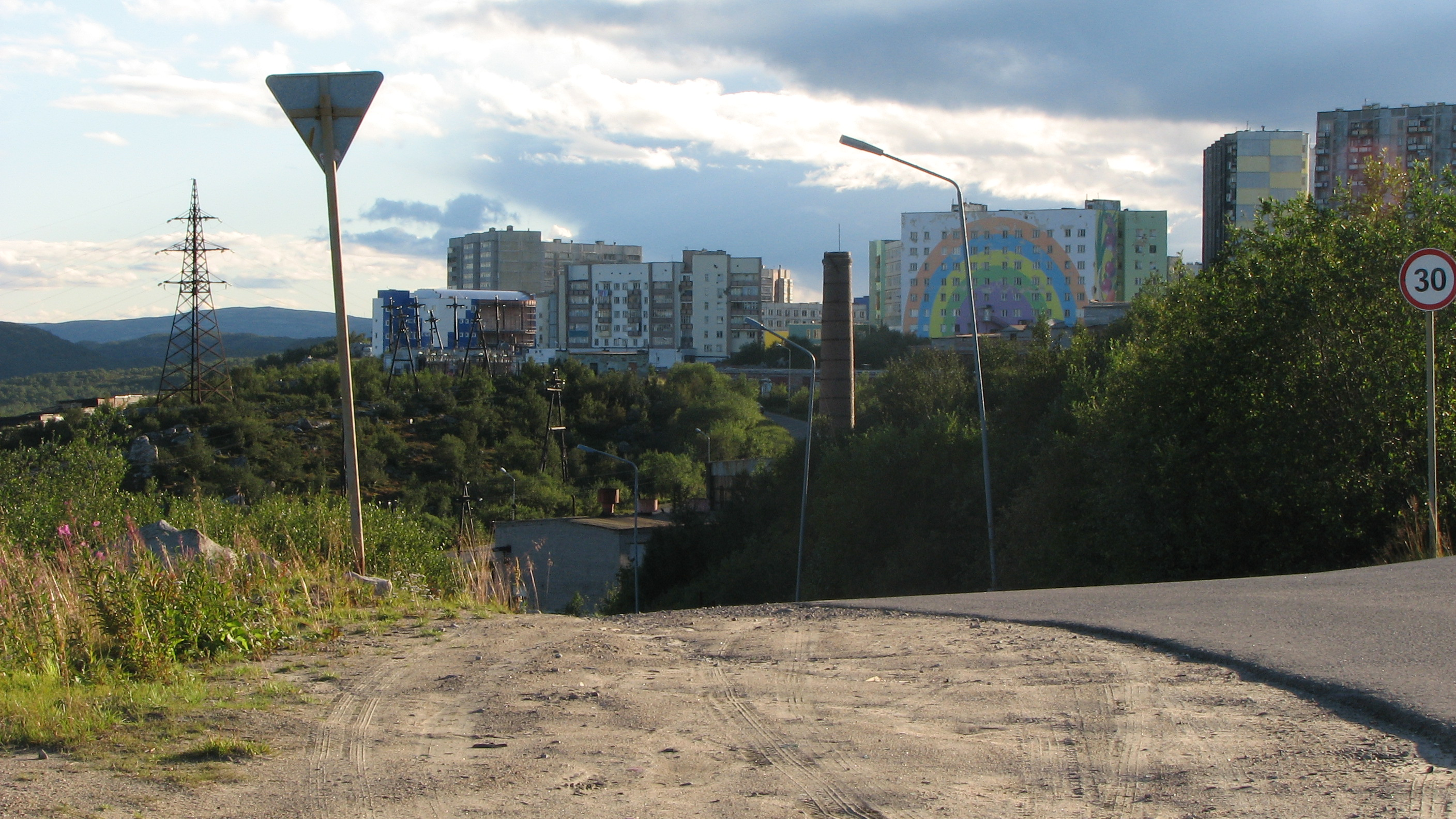
- The Rainbow House in Snezhnogorsk

- Flag Coat of arms
- Interactive map of Snezhnogorsk
- Location of Snezhnogorsk Snezhnogorsk (Murmansk Oblast)
- Coordinates: 69°12′N 33°14′E
- Country: Russia
- Federal subject: Murmansk Oblast
- Founded: 1970
- Town status since: 1980
- Elevation: 80 m (260 ft)

Population (2010 Census)
  - Total: 12,683
  - Estimate (2023): 10,023 (−21%)

Administrative status
  - Subordinated to: closed administrative-territorial formation of Alexandrovsk

Municipal status
  - Urban okrug: Alexandrovsk Urban Okrug
- Time zone: UTC+3 (MSK)
- Postal codes: 184682, 184683
- Dialing code: +7 81530
- OKTMO ID: 47737000011

Snezhnogorsk (Russian: Снежного́рск) is a town under the administrative jurisdiction of the closed administrative-territorial formation of Alexandrovsk in Murmansk Oblast, Russia. Population: 9,942 (2021 census); 12,689 (2010 census); 12,737 (2002 census);

Historical population
Year	Pop.	±%
1979	8,617	—
2002	12,737	+47.8%
2010	12,683	−0.4%
2021	9,942	−21.6%
Source: Censuses

== History ==
It was founded in 1970 and was granted town status in 1980. It was previously known as Murmansk-60 and Vyuzhny.

== Administrative and municipal status ==
Within the framework of administrative divisions, Snezhnogorsk is subordinated to the closed administrative-territorial formation of Alexandrovsk—an administrative unit with the status equal to that of the districts. Within the framework of municipal divisions, the town of Snezhnogorsk is a part of Alexandrovsk Urban Okrug.

== Economy ==
Map of Northern Fleet bases

The town's main employer is the Nerpa shipyard, which services and repairs the nuclear submarines of the Russian Northern Fleet.
