= Closed city =

Settlement with restricted access

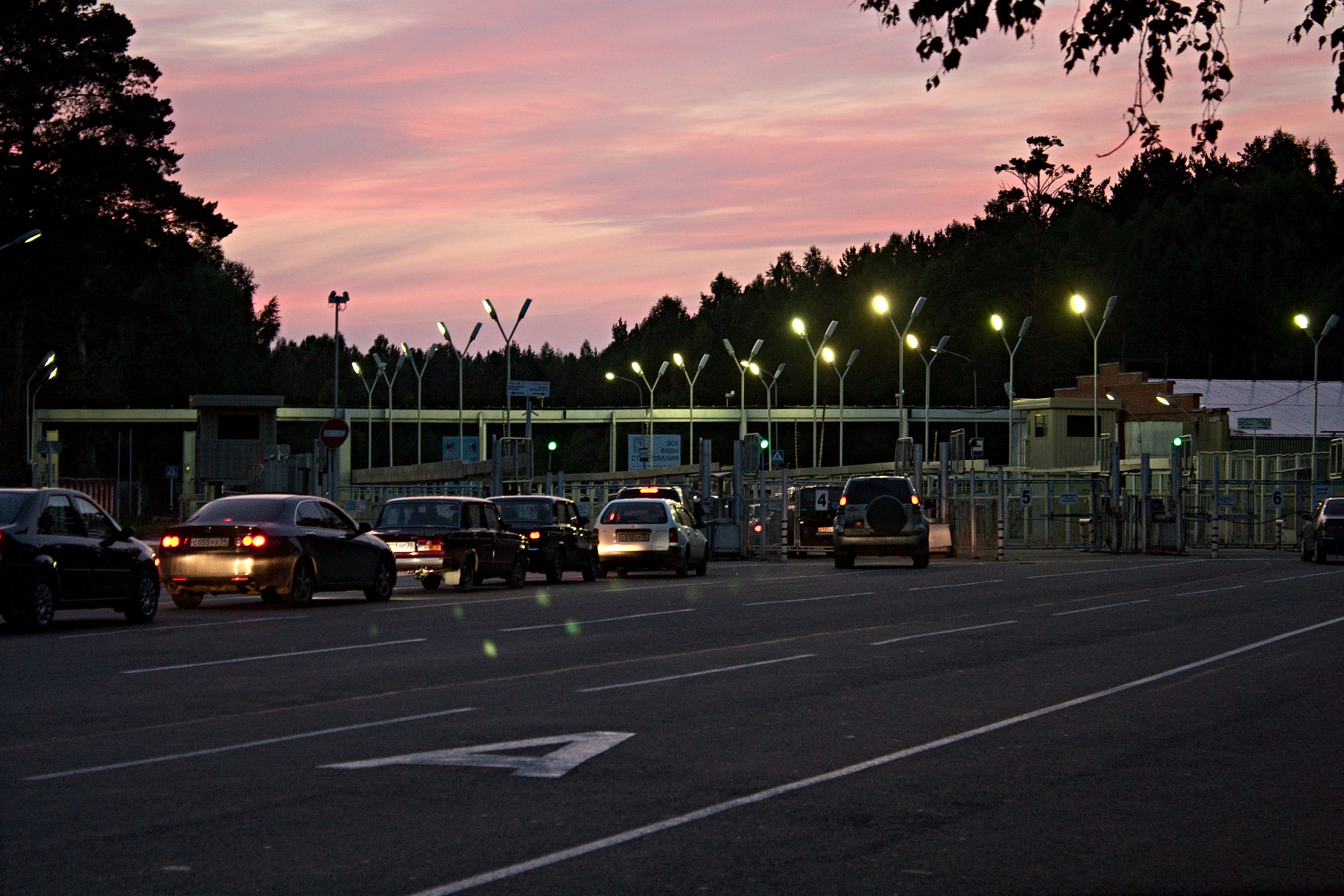
Central entry checkpoint to Seversk, a closed city in Russia's Tomsk Oblast, 2010

A closed city or closed town is a settlement where travel or residency is restricted. In the Soviet Union, closed cities were quarantined for research and military purposes. Many of them have stayed closed in Russia and some post-Soviet states. The concept exists in other countries as well.

Historically, the construction of closed cities became increasingly common after the beginning of the Cold War, particularly in the Soviet Union. Since the dissolution of the Soviet Union in 1991, they remain widespread in Russia and some of the other post-Soviet states. The Russian government officially designates these closed cities as "closed administrative–territorial formations" (ZATO; Russian: закрытые административно–территориальные образования [ЗАТО]), for the management and execution of high-value research and development concerning nuclear energy, weapons of mass destruction, or the space industry.

== Structure and operations ==
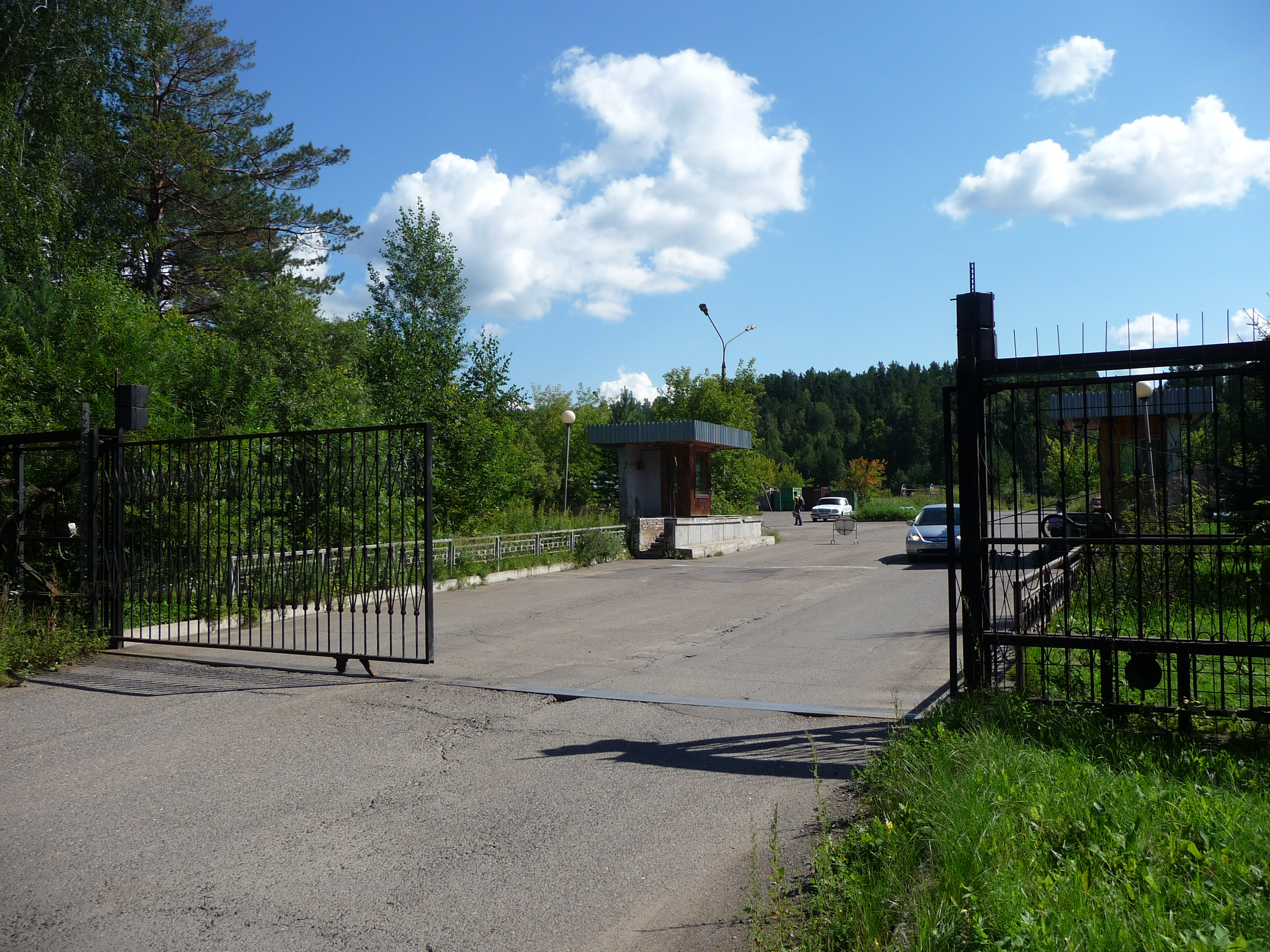
A checkpoint in Zheleznogorsk, a closed city in Russia's Krasnoyarsk Krai, 2011

Closed cities are sometimes represented only on classified maps that are not available to the general public.

Sometimes, closed cities are indicated obliquely as a nearby insignificant village, with the name of the stop serving the closed city made equivocal or misleading. For mail delivery, a closed city is usually named as the nearest large city and a special postcode, for example, Arzamas‑16, Chelyabinsk‑65. The actual settlement can be rather distant from its namesakes; for instance, Sarov, designated Arzamas-16, is in Nizhny Novgorod Oblast, whereas Arzamas is roughly 75 kilometres (47 mi) away. People not living in a closed city were subject to document checks and security checkpoints, and explicit permission was required for them to visit. To relocate to a closed city, one would need security clearance by the organization running it, such as the KGB in Soviet closed cities.

Closed cities may be guarded by a security perimeter with barbed wire and towers. The very fact of such a city's existence was often classified, and residents were expected not to divulge their place of residence to outsiders. This lack of freedom was often compensated by better housing conditions and a better choice of goods in retail trade than elsewhere in the country.

== In the Soviet Union ==
Map of Russia's federal subjects, with those highlighted in red containing closed cities for nuclear research and development, as of July 2009.

Closed cities were established in the Soviet Union from the late 1940s onwards under the euphemistic name of "post boxes", referring to the practice of addressing post to them via mailboxes in other cities. They fell into two distinct categories.

1. The first category comprised relatively small communities with sensitive military, industrial, or scientific facilities, such as arms plants or nuclear research sites. Examples are the modern towns of Ozyorsk (Chelyabinsk-65) with a plutonium production plant, and Sillamäe, the site of a uranium enrichment facility. Even Soviet citizens were not allowed access to these places without proper authorization. In addition to this, some bigger cities were closed for unauthorized access to foreigners, while they were freely accessible to Soviet citizens. These included cities like Perm, a center for Soviet artillery, munitions, and also aircraft engines production, and Vladivostok, the headquarters and primary base of the Soviet Pacific Fleet.
2. The second category consisted of border cities (and some whole border areas, such as the Kaliningrad Oblast, Saaremaa, and Hiiumaa), which were closed for security purposes. Comparable closed areas existed elsewhere in the Eastern bloc; a substantial area along the inner German border and the border between West Germany and Czechoslovakia was placed under similar restrictions (although by the 1970s foreigners could cross the latter by train). Citizens were required to have special permits to enter such areas.

The locations of the first category of closed cities were chosen for their geographical characteristics. They were often established in remote places deep in the Urals and Siberia, out of reach of enemy bombers. They were built close to rivers and lakes that were used to provide the large amounts of water needed for heavy industry and nuclear technology. Existing civilian settlements in the vicinity were often used as sources of construction labour. Although the closure of cities originated as a strictly temporary measure that was to be normalized under more favorable conditions, in practice the closed cities took on a life of their own and became a notable institutional feature of the Soviet system.

Any movement to and from closed areas was tightly controlled. Foreigners were prohibited from entering them and local citizens were under stringent restrictions. They had to have special permission to travel there or leave, and anyone seeking residency was required to undergo vetting by the NKVD and its successor agencies. Access to some closed cities was physically enforced by surrounding them with barbed wire fences monitored by armed guards.

== In post-Soviet countries ==
=== Russia ===
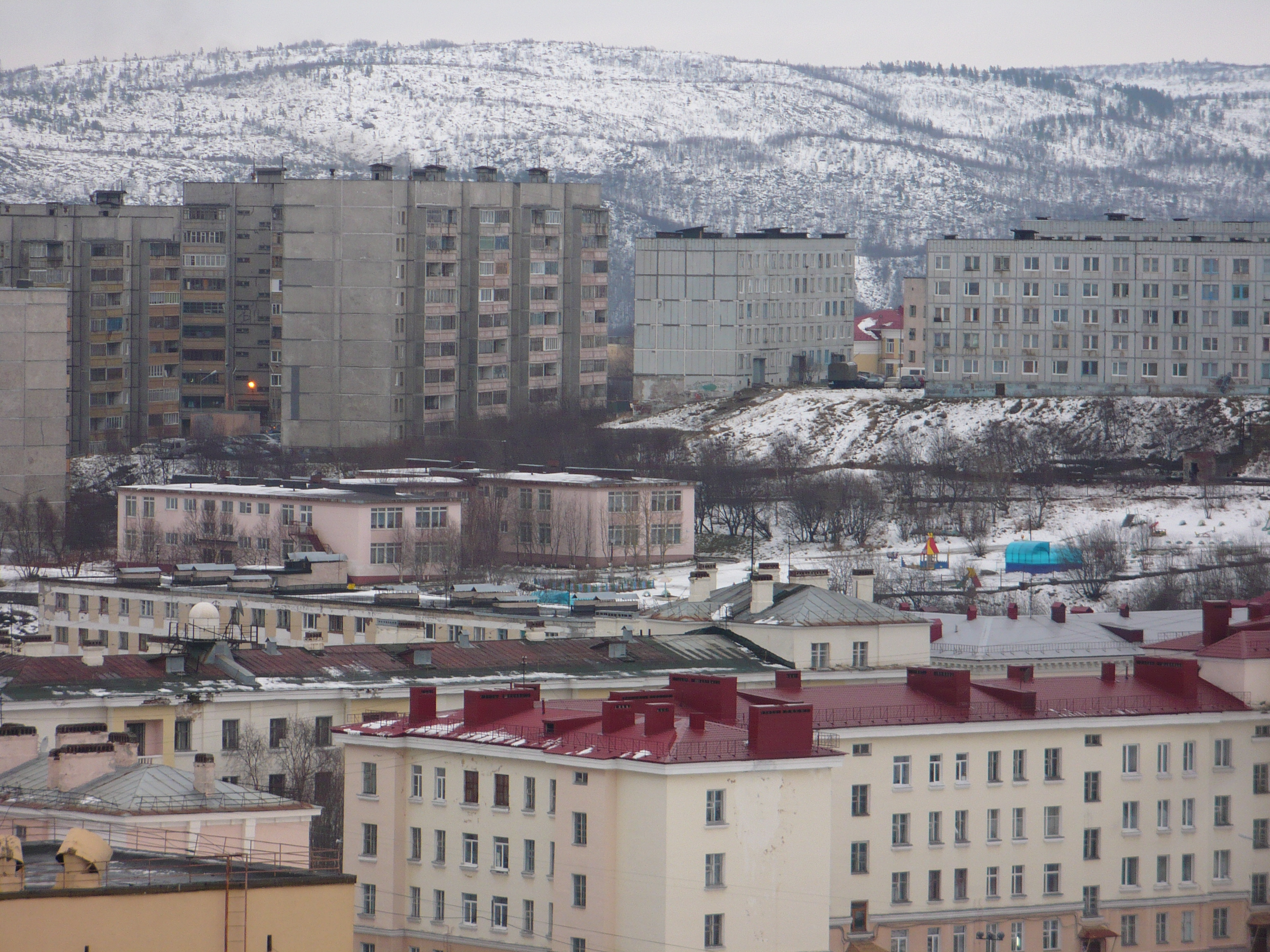
A view of housing units in Severomorsk, a closed town that serves as the headquarters of the Northern Fleet in Russia's Murmansk Oblast, 2010

Russia has the largest number of closed cities globally. The policy governing these cities underwent significant changes in the late 1980s and early 1990s. The adoption of a new constitution for the Russian Federation in 1993 prompted substantial reforms to the status of closed cities, which were subsequently renamed "closed administrative-territorial formations" (or ZATO, from the Russian acronym, Закры́тое администрати́вно-территориа́льное образова́ние (ЗАТО́)). Municipally, all such entities have the status of urban okrugs, as mandated by federal law.

There are 44 publicly acknowledged closed cities in Russia with a total population of approximately 1.5 million people. Seventy-five percent are administered by the Russian Ministry of Defense, with the remainder under the administration of Rosatom. It is believed that about 15 additional closed cities exist, but their names and locations have not been publicly disclosed by the Russian government.

Some Russian closed cities are open to foreign investment, but entry for foreigners requires a permit. An example of international cooperation in these cities is the Nuclear Cities Initiative (NCI), a joint effort of the United States National Nuclear Security Administration and Minatom, which involves, in part, the cities of Sarov, Snezhinsk, and Zheleznogorsk.

The number of closed cities has been significantly reduced since the mid-1990s. However, on 30 October 2001, foreign travel was restricted without exception in the northern cities of Norilsk, Talnakh, Kayerkan, Dudinka, and Igarka. Russian and Belarusian citizens visiting these cities are not required to have permits; however, local courts have been known to deport Belarusian citizens.

The number of closed cities in Russia is defined by government decree. The reasons for restrictions vary. These cities include:

Altai Krai

- Sibirsky

Amur Oblast

- Tsiolkovsky – renamed from Uglegorsk in 2013 and known as Svobodny-18 (Свободный-18) before that, site of the second Russian trial cosmodrome of the Ministry of Defense of the Russian Federation, also called Svobodny Cosmodrome.

Arkhangelsk Oblast

- Mirny – site of Plesetsk Cosmodrome.

Astrakhan Oblast

- Znamensk – formerly known as Kapustin Yar-1 (Капустин Яр-1), home to the Kapustin Yar (air base) and the "4th Missile Test Range".

Republic of Bashkortostan

- Mezhgorye – formerly known as Ufa-105 (Уфа-105) and Beloretsk-15 (Белорецк-15), home to the 129th Directorate of strategic subjects' technical supply and maintenance.

Chelyabinsk Oblast

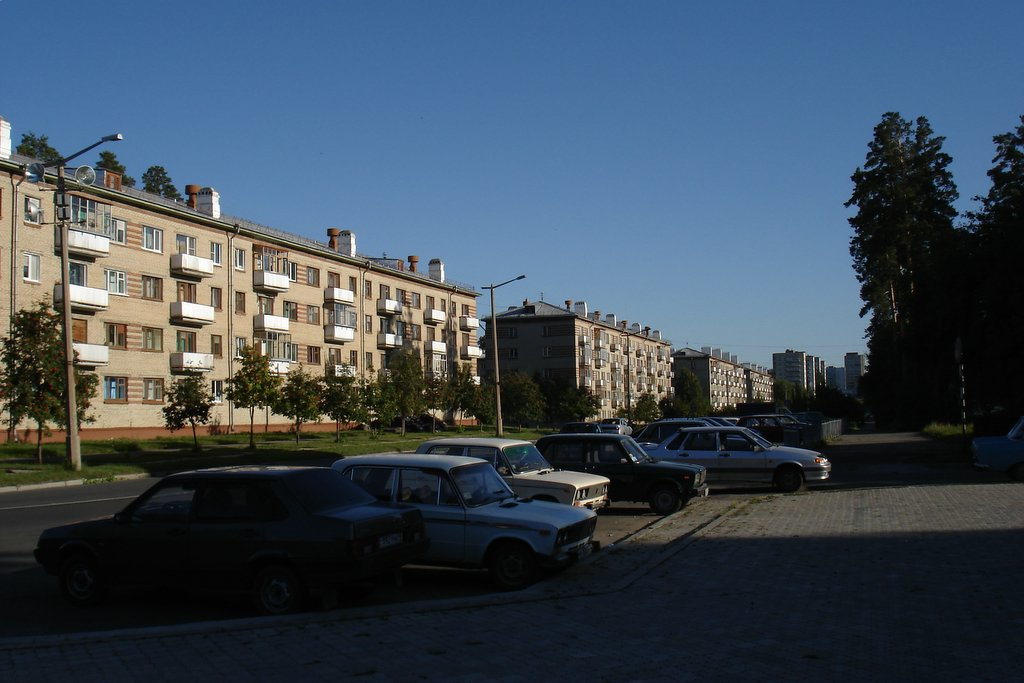
A street in Snezhinsk, a closed town in Russia's Chelyabinsk Oblast, 2006

- Lokomotivny
- Ozyorsk – formerly known as Chelyabinsk-65 (Челябинск-65) and Chelyabinsk-40 (Челябинск-40), nuclear material processing and recycling plant.
- Snezhinsk – formerly known as Chelyabinsk-70 (Челябинск-70), site of one of the two major Russian Federal Nuclear Centers.
- Tryokhgorny – formerly known as Zlatoust-36 (Златоуст-36), site of development of parts and machinery for atomic stations and weaponry.

Kamchatka Krai

- Vilyuchinsk – formerly known as Petropavlovsk-Kamchatsky-50 (Петропавловск-Камчатский-50), base of a squadron of submarines from the Russian Pacific Fleet, also involved in the production of nuclear submarines.

Kirov Oblast

- Pervomaysky – formerly known as Yurya-2 (Юрья-2).

Krasnoyarsk Krai

- Dikson
- Solnechny – formerly known as Uzhur-4 (Ужур-4).
- Zelenogorsk – formerly known as Krasnoyarsk-45 (Красноярск-45).
- Zheleznogorsk – formerly known as Krasnoyarsk-26 (Красноярск-26).

Moscow Oblast

- Krasnoznamensk – formerly known as Golitsyno-2 (Голицыно-2).
- Molodyozhny – formerly known as Naro-Fominsk-5 (Наро-Фоминск-5).
- Vlasikha – formerly known as Gorky-2 (Горький-2).
- Voskhod – formerly known as Novopetrovsk-2 (Новопетровск-2).
- Zvyozdny gorodok – formerly known as Shchyolkovo-14 (Щёлково-14).

Murmansk Oblast

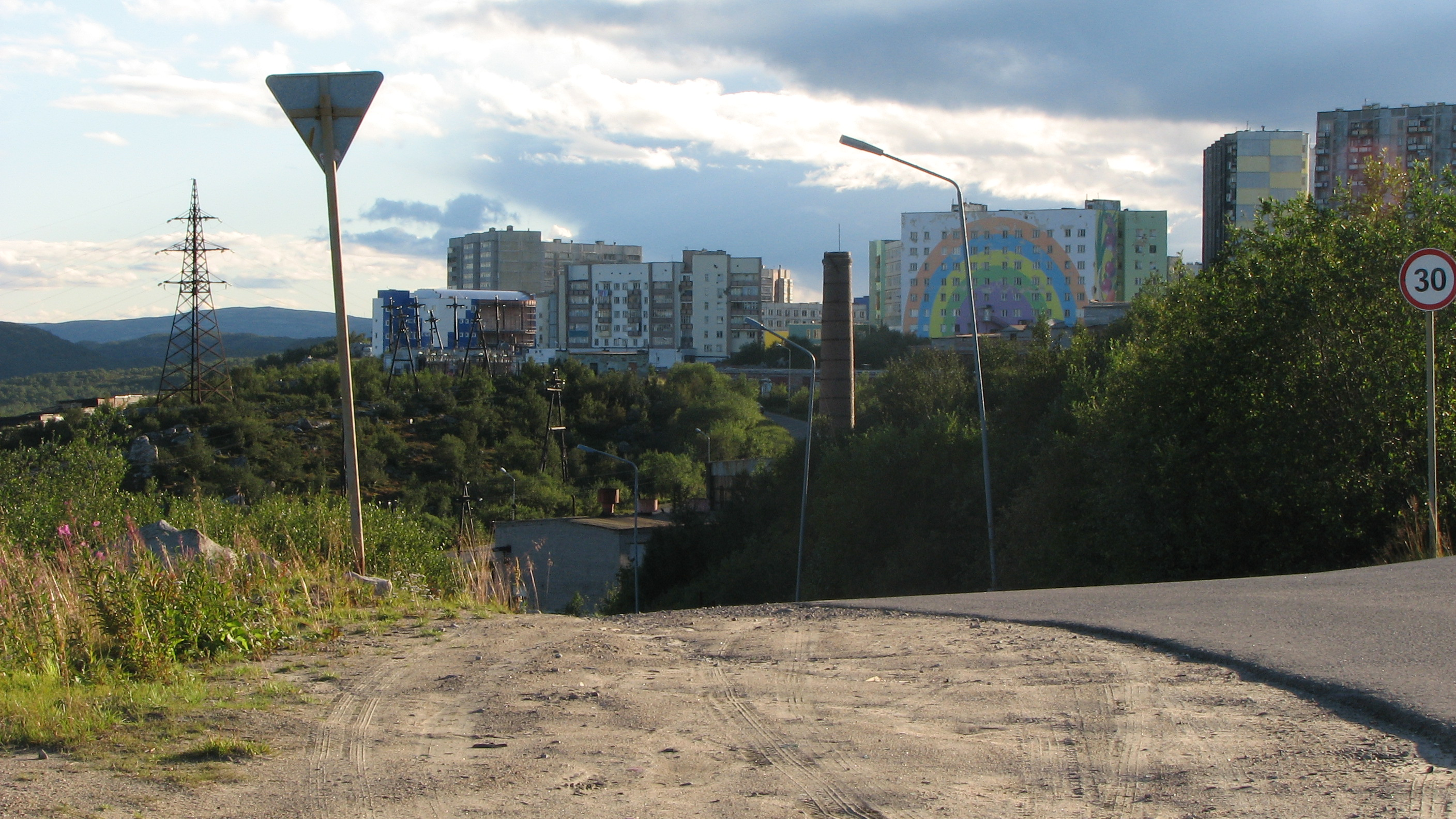
A view of Snezhnogorsk, a closed town in Russia's Murmansk Oblast, 2008

- Alexandrovsk – closed administrative-territorial formation, includes the towns of Gadzhiyevo, Polyarny, and Snezhnogorsk
- Ostrovnoy
- Severomorsk
- Snezhnogorsk
- Vidyayevo
- Zaozyorsk

Nizhny Novgorod Oblast

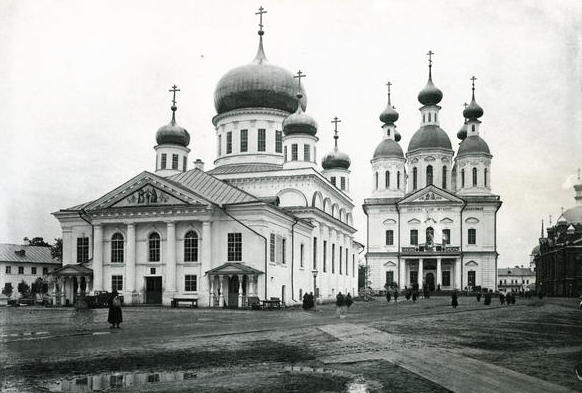
A view of the Sarov Monastery in 1904 in Sarov, which was a regular city in the Russian Empire at the time. It became a closed city in the Soviet Union in 1946, and has remained a closed city in the Russian Federation since 1991.

- Sarov – formerly known as Arzamas-16

Orenburg Oblast

- Komarovsky

Penza Oblast

- Zarechny – formerly known as Penza-19

Perm Krai

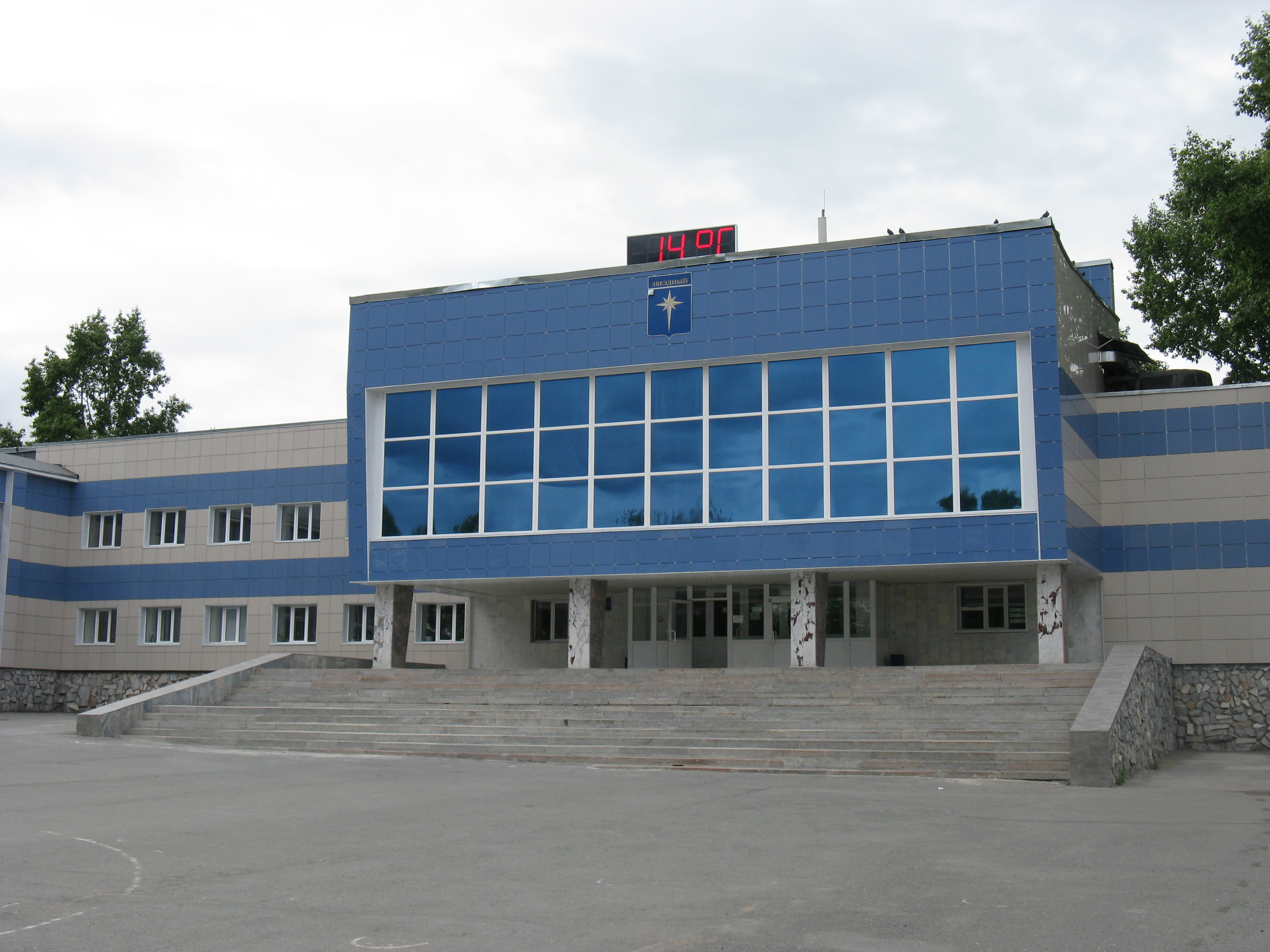
A cultural centre in Zvyozdny, a closed "urban-type settlement" in Russia's Perm Krai, 2010

- Zvyozdny – formerly known as Perm-76 (Пермь-76).

Primorsky Krai

- Fokino – formerly known as Shkotovo-17 (Шкотово-17).

Pskov Oblast

- Smuravyevo

Saratov Oblast

- Mikhaylovsky
- Shikhany
- Svetly

Sverdlovsk Oblast

- Lesnoy – formerly known as Sverdlovsk-45
- Novouralsk – formerly known as Sverdlovsk-44
- Svobodny
- Uralsky

Tomsk Oblast

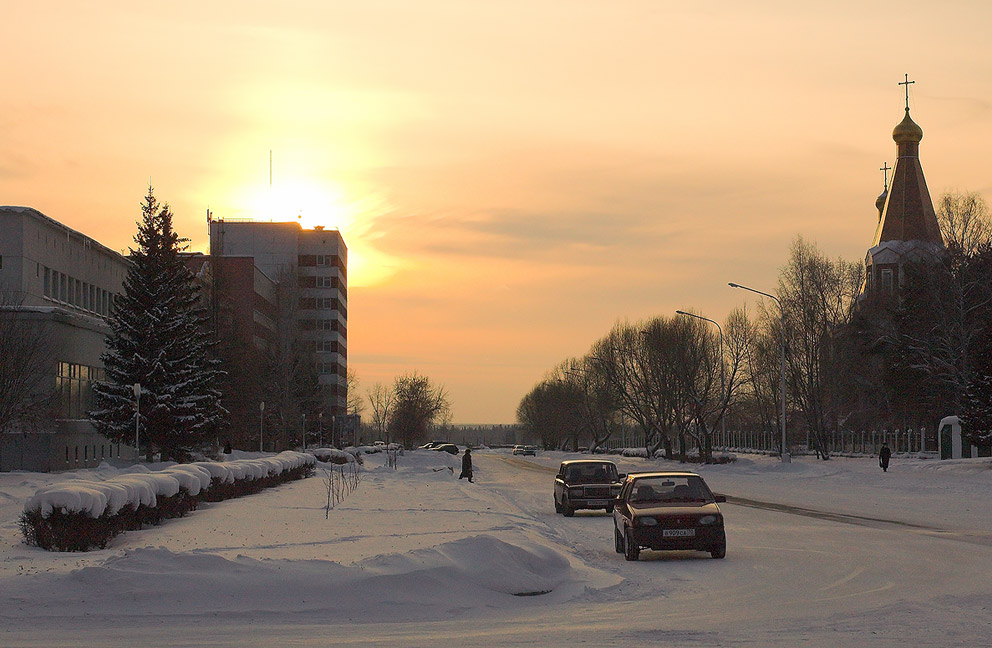
A view of Seversk, a closed city in Russia's Tomsk Oblast, 2006

- Seversk – formerly known as Tomsk-7

Tver Oblast

- Ozyorny
- Solnechny

Vladimir Oblast

- Raduzhny

Zabaykalsky Krai

- Gorny – formerly known as Chita-46 (Чита-46).

==== Non-ZATO restricted territories ====
There is a list of territories within Russia that do not have closed-city status but require special permits for foreigners to visit. The largest locality within such territory is the city of Norilsk.

=== Estonia ===
There were two closed cities in Estonia: Sillamäe and Paldiski. As with all the other industrial cities, their population was mainly Russian-speaking. Sillamäe was the site for a chemical factory that produced fuel rods and nuclear materials for the Soviet nuclear power plants and nuclear weapon facilities, while Paldiski was home to a Soviet Navy nuclear submarine training centre. Sillamäe was closed until Estonia regained its independence in 1991; Paldiski remained closed until 1994, when the last Russian warship left.

Tartu, home to Raadi Airfield, was partially closed. Foreign academics could visit the University of Tartu, but had to sleep elsewhere.

=== Kazakhstan ===
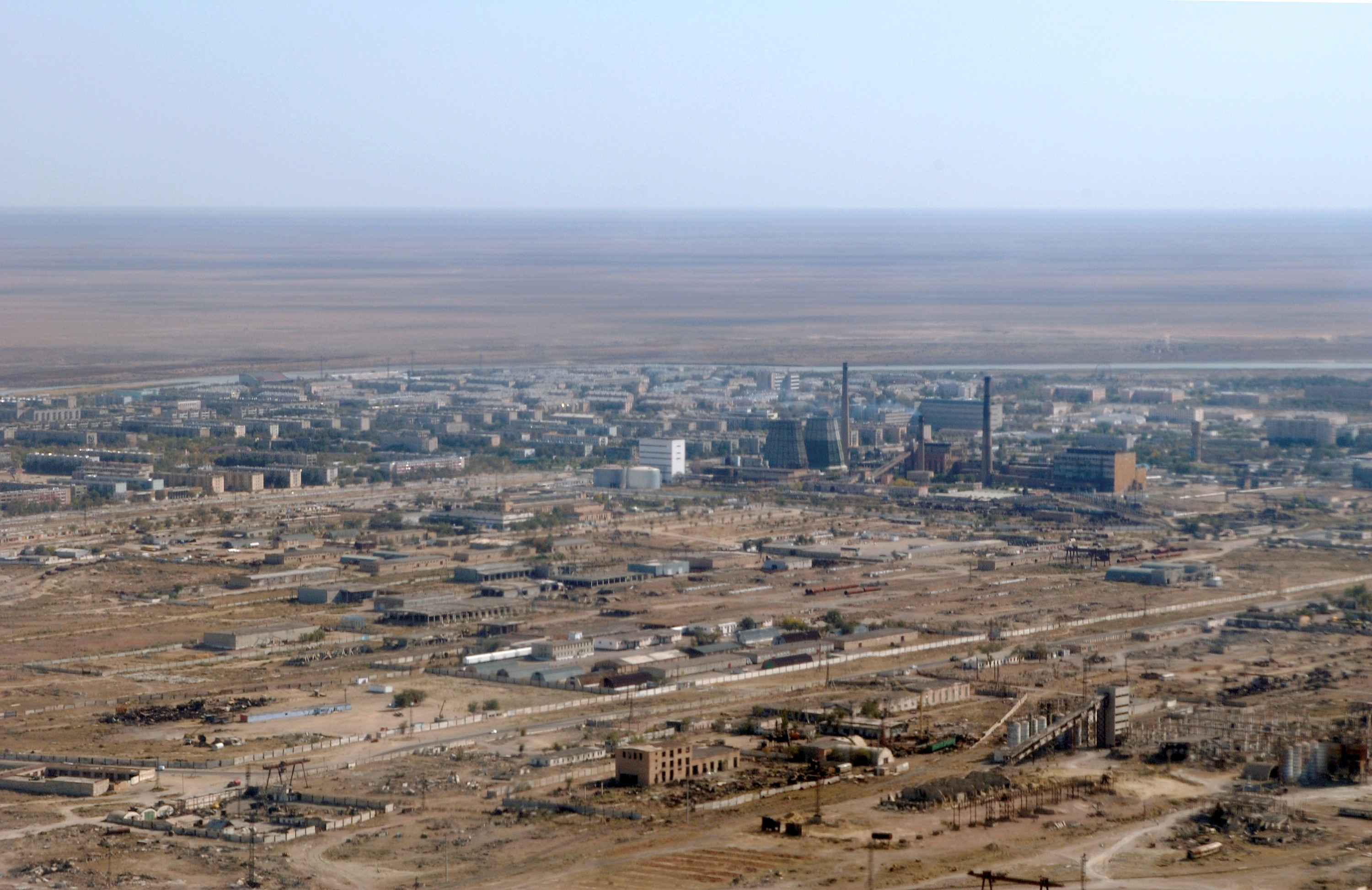
A 2004 aerial photograph of Baikonur, which became a closed city in the Kazakh SSR of the Soviet Union after it began serving the Soviet space program in 1955. Although it is now within the Kyzylorda Region of Kazakhstan, it has been leased to Russia until 2050. Accordingly, those who visit the city require a permit from Russia's Roscosmos, which manages the Soviet-era Baikonur Cosmodrome.

- Baikonur, a town close to the Baikonur Cosmodrome in Kazakhstan, leased to and administered by Russia. Non-resident visitors require prior approval from the Russian authorities to visit both the town of Baikonur itself and the Cosmodrome. Note that said approval is completely separate from just having a Russian visa. Some tourism organisations in Kazakhstan provide services in organising trips to visit Baikonur and the museums contained there.
- Priozersk, Kazakhstan
- Kurchatov, Kazakhstan – a former closed city that was known by its postal code, Semipalatinsk-21.

=== Kyrgyzstan ===
- Mailuu-Suu, Jalal-Abad Region, a formerly closed uranium mining town, once known as "Mailbox 200".

=== Latvia ===
- Karosta, a former Russian and Soviet naval base.
- Skrunda-1, a former Soviet communications base. Currently used by the Latvian Armed Forces as of 2022.

=== Moldova ===
Moldova has one partially closed city: the village of Cobasna (Rîbnița District), which is under the control of the unrecognized state of Transnistria internationally recognized as part of Moldova. The village, on the left bank of the Dniester river, contains a large Soviet-era ammunition depot guarded by Russian troops. Only the Transnistrian and Russian authorities have detailed information about this depot.

=== Ukraine ===
Ukraine had eighteen closed cities, including:

- Dnipro – former closed city, a major center of Soviet aerospace industry.
- Simferopol-28, Crimea – former closed town, a Soviet military space mission control center.
- Kamianske – former closed city, largest uranium processing factory in former Soviet Union.
- Feodosia-13, Crimea – former closed town, a central storage of nuclear weapons.
- Balaklava, Sevastopol – former closed town, the location of a submarine repair plant.
- Chernobyl-2, Kyiv Oblast – former closed town, the location of the receiving unit of the Duga radar.
- Liubech-1, Chernihiv Oblast – former closed town, the location of the transmission unit of the Duga radar.

== In other countries ==
=== Albania ===
During the period of communist rule in Albania, the towns of Çorovodë and Qyteti Stalin (now Kuçovë) were closed cities with a military airport, military industry and other critical war infrastructure.

=== Australia ===
- Arnhem Land is a historical region of the Northern Territory which requires permits for access to non-Aboriginal individuals beyond public roads.
- Puckapunyal is a restricted-access town in a military area in Victoria, home to some 250 families.

=== Canada ===
- Ralston, Alberta, is a closed village located in CFB Suffield.

=== China ===
- No. 404 Factory of China National Nuclear Corporation (中国核工业总公司第四零四厂), then the Ministry of Nuclear Industry, in the Gobi desert in the western part of Gansu, is a closed town often called the nuclear town (核城). Built in 1958, it is China's biggest nuclear industry base. China built its first military nuclear reactor there and 80% of the core parts for China's nuclear bombs were produced there. Until the 1980s, the whole town was closed to outsiders. A nuclear accident happened in 1969, involving a leak. The name "mine area of Gansu" (甘肃矿区) was used for secrecy. In 2007, most residents were moved to nearby Jiayuguan City.
- Some remote areas in China, such as Datong Hui and Tu Autonomous County (except Laoye Mountain), Huangzhong County (except Kumbum Monastery), and Huangyuan County around Xining, the capital of Qinghai, maintain travel restrictions for foreigners. A foreigner must apply for an alien travel document (外国人旅行证) in advance, and report their accommodation to local police within 24 hours after entering the area.

=== Germany ===
- Riems, Germany, an island in the Bay of Greifswald, is home to the oldest virological research institution in the world and is closed to the public. Quarantine stables and laboratories have a high level of security. This means employees and visitors to the complex must change their clothes and shower when entering and exiting.

=== Hong Kong ===
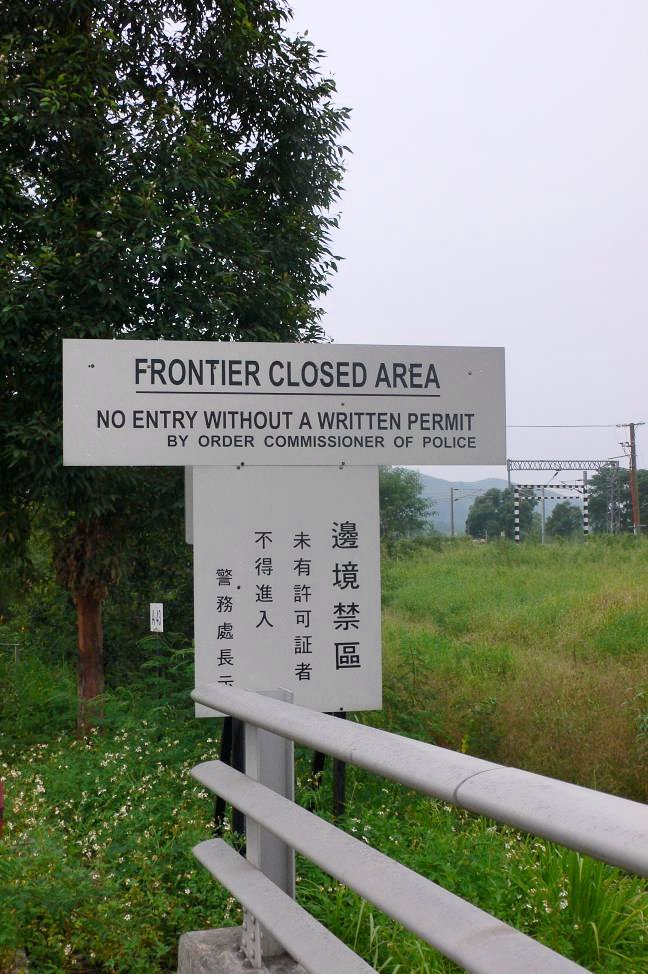
A signboard for the Frontier Closed Area in Hong Kong, 2006

The Frontier Closed Area (FCA) is a restricted zone along the northern border of Hong Kong, serving as a buffer between the closed border and the rest of the territory. Access to this area requires a Closed Area Permit. From 1951 to 2012, the FCA encompassed an area of 28 square kilometres, containing numerous villages. Following several stages of reduction, by 2016, the border town of Sha Tau Kok remained as the sole settlement within the FCA.

=== Indonesia ===
- Three inner Baduy hamlets, Cibeo, Cikawartana, and Cikeusik, and an Outer Baduy hamlet, Gajeboh, are closed to foreign tourists.

=== South Korea (ROK) ===
Within the Korean Demilitarized Zone between North Korea and South Korea are two "peace villages" (one maintained by each nation): Daeseong-dong (South) and (possibly) Kijŏng-dong (North). Access by non-residents to Daeseong-dong requires a military escort, while Kijŏng-dong is not accessible to visitors.

=== North Korea (DPRK) ===
The Yongbyon Nuclear Scientific Research Center sits within a closed city that occupies 24.8 square kilometers (9.6 sq mi). The classification of a city being closed or not closed is dubious in a North Korean context, as North Korean citizens generally need a permit if they wish to travel outside of their county, and further permits required for entry to Pyongyang, thus the whole nation could be considered closed.

=== Mexico ===
- In Baja California, the communities on Guadalupe Island (such as Campo Oeste) can be considered closed towns; because Guadalupe Island is within a Biosphere Reserve, the Mexican government requires special permits in order to visit the island.

=== Saudi Arabia ===
- Mecca is closed to non-Muslims. Similar restrictions are in place for the city centre of Medina.

=== South Africa ===
- Alexander Bay, Northern Cape. After diamonds were discovered along this coast in 1925 by Hans Merensky, Alexander Bay became known for its mining activities. The town was a high-security area and permits were needed when entered. Today, it is no longer a high-security area and no permits are needed.

=== Sweden ===
- Fårö and the northernmost parts of Gotland were closed to foreign citizens until 1998.

=== United Kingdom ===
- Imber, England, has been closed since 1943 when its residents were evicted by the British Army, who continue to use the village as a training ground for urban warfare. While most of the village's buildings have been demolished and replaced for training purposes, the village church (St Giles') was kept intact and the village is occasionally opened to the public during holidays.
- Foulness Island contains two villages with permanent residences, but public right of way is limited to certain paths and access controlled by the Ministry of Defence. The site contains an active live firing range, several inactive firing ranges and other structures, and the site of the development and testing of the UK's first atomic weapons.

=== United States ===
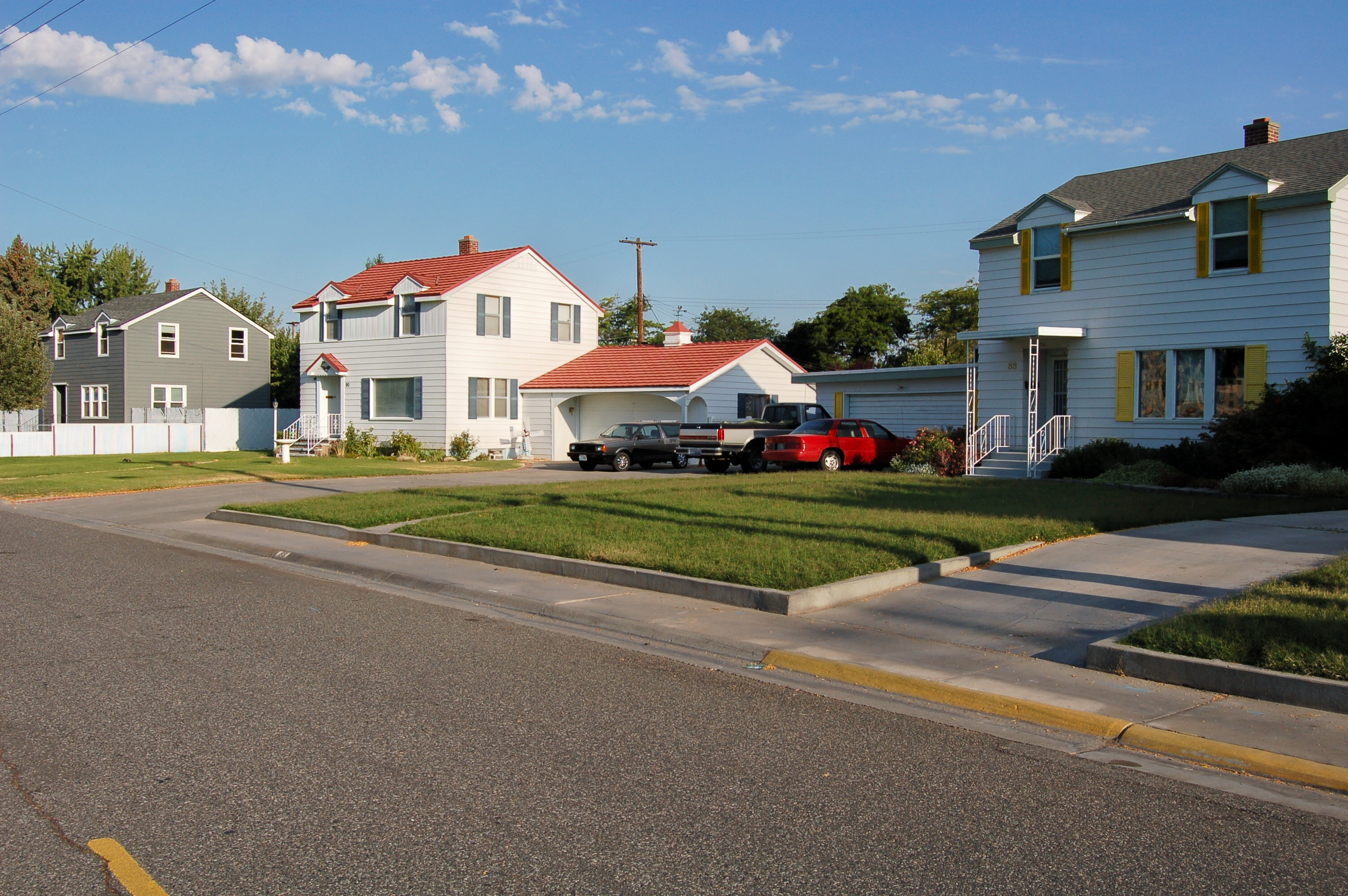
A street in the Gold Coast Historic District, which was a closed zone in Richland, Washington, during the Manhattan Project in the United States, 2007

- Dugway, Utah, inside the Dugway Proving Ground.
- The Gold Coast Historic District in Richland, Washington, was a closed city during the Manhattan Project.
- Johnston Atoll is closed to public entry, with limited access for management needs if one is granted a letter of authorization from the United States Air Force.
- Los Alamos, New Mexico, was a closed city during the Manhattan Project.
- Mercury, Nevada, is within the Nevada Test Site, the primary testing location of American nuclear devices from 1951 to 1992, currently called Nevada National Security Site, and is currently closed as part of this site.
- Oak Ridge, Tennessee, was a closed city during the Manhattan Project.
- Hart Island in New York City: former military site, a city potter's field and occasional site of crisis mass graves including for 1918 flu, AIDS, and COVID-19 victims. Some visitors may be allowed after 2023.
- Plum Island, New York, home of the Plum Island Animal Disease Center

Between 1957 and 1962, approximately one-third of the United States was closed to Soviet citizens. Only seven states were accessible in their entirety: Oregon, Wyoming, Utah, North Carolina, Arkansas, Vermont, and Mississippi.

== In popular culture ==
The 2020 film Tenet prominently features a fictional Soviet-era closed city in Siberia called Stalsk-12.

The 2025 video game Z.A.T.O // I Love the World and Everything In It is set in the fictional closed city of Vorkuta-5.

== See also ==
- Coast Guard City
- Exclusion zone
- Internal passport
- Border barrier
- Separation barrier
- Closed military townlet
- Naukograd
- Nuclear Cities Initiative
- Propiska in the Soviet Union
- List of cities with defensive walls
