= Molodyozhny, Moscow Oblast =

Closed settlement in Moscow Oblast, Russia

Molodyozhny Молодёжный
- Settlement
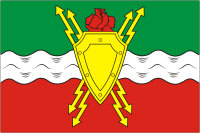
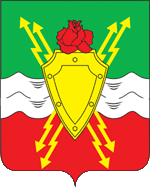
- Flag Coat of arms
- Interactive map of Molodyozhny
- Location of Molodyozhny Molodyozhny (Moscow Oblast)
- Coordinates: 55°19′40″N 36°47′10″E
- Country: Russia
- Federal subject: Moscow Oblast
- Founded: 1964

Population (2010 Census)
  - Total: 2,920
  - Estimate (2025): 2,838 (−2.8%)

Administrative status
  - Subordinated to: closed administrative-territorial formation of Molodyozhny
  - Capital of: closed administrative-territorial formation of Molodyozhny

Municipal status
  - Urban okrug: Molodyozhny Urban Okrug
  - Capital of: Molodyozhny Urban Okrug
- Time zone: UTC+3 (MSK)
- Postal code: 143355
- OKTMO ID: 46761000051

Molodyozhny (Russian: Молодёжный), formerly known as Naro-Fominsk-5 (Наро-Фоминск-5) is a closed urban locality (a settlement) in Moscow Oblast, Russia. Population: 2,920 (2010 census); 2,599 (2002 census).

== Geography and transportation ==
It is surrounded by the territory of Naro-Fominsky District of Moscow Oblast. There is an automobile road to the village of Ateptsevo.

== Administrative and municipal status ==
Within the framework of administrative divisions, it is incorporated as the closed administrative-territorial formation of Molodyozhny—an administrative unit with the status equal to that of the districts. As a municipal division, the closed administrative-territorial formation of Molodyozhny is incorporated as Molodyozhny Urban Okrug.

== Military ==
It is used by the Strategic Missile Troops of Russia.
