= Oksana Pushkina =

Russian journalist, human rights activist and politician (born 1963)

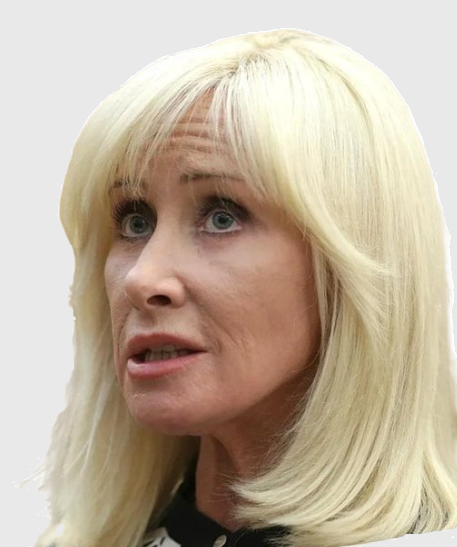

Member of the State Duma for Moscow Oblast
- In office 5 October 2016 – 12 October 2021
- Preceded by: constituency re-established
- Succeeded by: Denis Maydanov
- Constituency: Odintsovo (No. 122)

Personal details
- Born: 10 May 1963 (age 63) Petrozavodsk, Russian SFSR, Soviet Union
- Party: United Russia
- Spouse(s): Vladislav Konovalov (divorced) Alexey Shirokikh
- Children: Artyom Konovalov (son)
- Parents: Viktor Pushkin (father); Svetlana Pushkina (mother)
- Education: Leningrad State University
- Occupation: Journalist; Human rights activist

Oksana Viktorovna Pushkina (Russian: Оксана Викторовна Пушкина; born 10 May 1963) is a Russian journalist, television presenter, author and women's rights advocate who served in the State Duma from 2016 to 2021. In 2018 she was the only Duma member to publicly back the journalists who accused Leonid Slutsky, then chairman of the Duma's Foreign Affairs Committee and since 2022 leader of the LDPR party, of sexual harassment. In 2019 she co-authored a bill on preventing domestic violence, for which she received death threats. She was a member of the Russian delegation to the Parliamentary Assembly of the Council of Europe, where she sat on the Committee on Equality and Non-Discrimination. The BBC named her to its 100 Women list in 2020. In 2020 she was named a Leadership Champion of the Women Entrepreneurs Finance Initiative (We-Fi) for 2020-2022, a G20 programme hosted by the World Bank. Pushkina lives in the United States; a 2024 Public Voices Fellow of The OpEd Project and Equality Now, she writes for the San Francisco Chronicle and other publications.

== Biography ==
Oksana Viktorovna Pushkina was born on 10 May 1963 in Petrozavodsk. Her mother, Svetlana Andreevna, was a television journalist and her father, Viktor Vasilyevich Pushkin, was a coach of the Russian national athletics team.

=== Journalism ===
In 1979, she obtained a diploma in rhythmic gymnastics and finished in 1980 a school of general education and music. In 1985 she graduated from the Faculty of Journalism of Leningrad State University. She then worked from 1985 to 1991 at the youth editorial board of Leningrad TV-5.

In 1990–1992, she produced the monthly programs Lady Luck («Госпожа Удача») and Man of Results ("Человек результата"). In 1993, she left for an internship in San Francisco, where she worked as a correspondent and coordinator at ABC. After studying television management and marketing, she returned to Russia in 1997.

In September 1997, she presented, in a special edition of the program Outlook ("Взгляд"), her first broadcast after her return to Russia, The Return of Irina Rodnina ("Возвращение Ирины Родниной") .

In December 1997, she was the author of the television project Oksana Pushkina's Women's Stories ("Женские истории Оксаны Пушкиной"), presented on the ORT channel (currently Channel One Russia). In September 1999, Oksana Pushkina left the channel.

A month later, she joined the broadcaster NTV, where she presented Oksana Pushkina's Female View ("Женский взгляд Оксаны Пушкиной"). ORT launched at the same time the program Tatiana Pushkina's Women's Stories, whose presenter resembled her. Oksana Pushkina presented her weekly program from 27 October 1999 to 1 February 2013.

In 2006, she participated in the Channel One show Stars on the Ice with Alexei Yagudin.

In February 2013, she left NTV and returned to Channel One where she hosted the show I am Filing for Divorce ("Я подаю на развод")

The show was put on air on weekdays from March to August 2013, then was cancelled for unexplained reasons.

In 2016, Oksana Pushkina returned to NTV where she hosted the program Mirror for Heroes ("Зеркало для героя") She described her return to air on the main event of 8 March. This show lasted from 8 March to 7 July 2016.

Oksana is an author of 25 bestseller books on topics of women's personal development, professional career advancements and entrepreneurship.

=== Defender of Children's rights ===
On 18 June 2015, Oksana Pushkina was appointed by the Moscow Oblast Duma, on the proposal of the governor, Andrey Vorobyov, as the delegate for the children's rights of the Moscow Oblast. In these roles, she helped to create accommodation for children raised in orphanages, and proposed the creation of crisis center welcoming mothers in emergency conditions and for the child victims of domestic violence.

She is also on the board of 'League of the Dream', an organization working to support people with cerebral palsy, autism, Down Syndrome, visual and hearing impairments and other disabilities.

=== Member of the Duma ===
Pushkina left her job on 29 September 2016 after she was elected to the State Duma of the Federal Assembly of the Russian Federation. She was a candidate in the 2016 Russian parliamentary elections on the list United Russia in the district of Odintsovo (Moscow Oblast) and was elected as a member of Parliament.

She was vice-chair of the Committee on the Family, Women and Children.

Oksana Pushkina was the only parliamentarian who publicly sided with the journalists Farida Rustamova, Ekaterina Kotrikadze, Anastasia Karimova and Darya Schuk, who accused Leonid Slutsky, a member of the Committee on Foreign Affairs of the Duma and since 2022 leader of the LDPR party, of sexual harassment. She expressed her regret about the legal vacuum on harassment that existed in Russian legislation. and stated "This problem is a reality in our country. It must be regulated by legislation and I will do everything in my power in this regard".

In 2019 she co-authored a bill on preventing domestic violence, for which she received death threats.

Oksana Pushkina has more generally condemned publicly the professional inequalities between women and men in Russia. and defended a bill to fight discrimination against women which has not been included in the agenda of parliament. She was also the author of a draft law on childbirth under X, and another on the obligation for parents to care for children who are HIV-positive, justified by denials of attention in traditionalist families.

She has also been the author and supporter of the bills on federal alimony fund, on female entrepreneurship and gender equality.

== Advocacy and membership in international organizations ==
Oksana Pushkina is a member of the board of the SPID Foundation, which aims to prevent and combat AIDS.

She was a member of the Russian delegation to the Parliamentary Assembly of the Council of Europe, where she sat on the Committee on Equality and Non-Discrimination.

In 2020 she was named a Leadership Champion of the Women Entrepreneurs Finance Initiative (We-Fi) for 2020-2022, a G20 programme hosted by the World Bank.

Pushkina lives in the United States; a 2024 Public Voices Fellow of The OpEd Project and Equality Now, she writes for the San Francisco Chronicle and other publications.

== TV shows ==
- Lady Luck («Госпожа Удача») (1992–1993)
- Man of Results («Человек результата») (1992–1993)
- Oksana Pushkina's Women's Stories («Женские истории Оксаны Пушкиной») (1997–1999) – ORT
- The Female View («Женский взгляд»)(1999–2013) – NTV
- I am Filing for Divorce («Я подаю на развод») – Channel one
- Irina Rodnina. A Woman of Character («Ирина Роднина. Женщина с характером») (2014) – documentary (author and director), Channel One
- Mirror for Heroes («Зеркало для героя») (2016) – NTV.

== Prizes and awards ==
- BBC 100 Women 2020 (23 November 2020), selected by BBC as one of 100 inspiring and influential women from around the world who are leading change and making a difference in 2020.
- Order of Friendship (27 June 2007), for her great contribution to the development of national television and her many years of fruitful work.
- National Public Recognition Award for Women's Achievement Olympia of the Russian Academy of Commerce and Entrepreneurship (2004).
