= Sasha Gradiva =

American singer (born 1979)

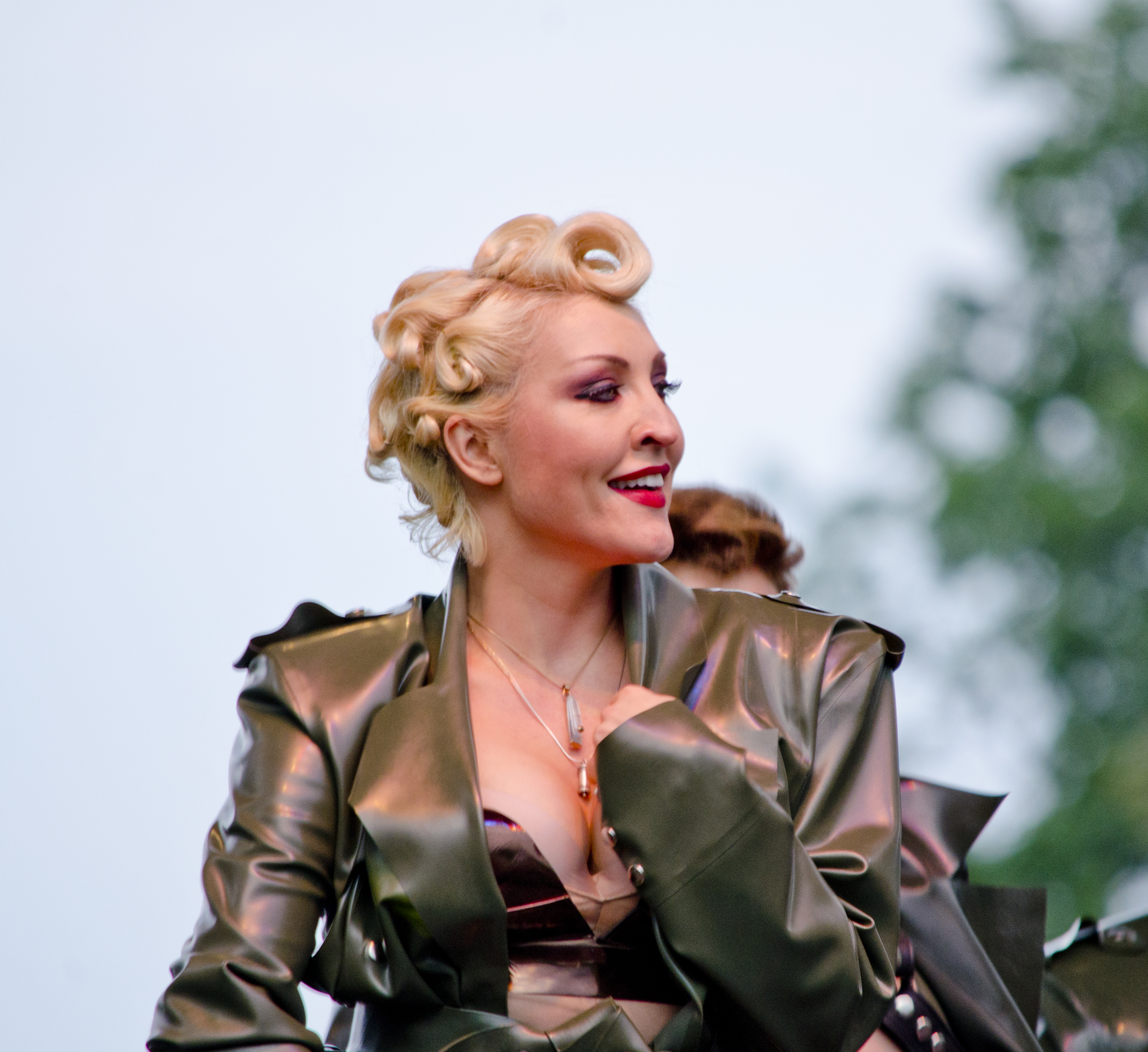
- Gradiva performing at Gay Pride in Washington D.C. in 2013

Background information
- Born: Sasha Mikhailovna Antonova; 5 February 1979 (age 47); Moscow, Russia
- Genres: Pop, dance
- Occupations: Singer, songwriter, producer, performing artist
- Years active: 2000–present
- Labels: ARS Records, ProfMusic, Saadko Music, Inc
- Website: sashagradiva.com

Sasha Mikhailovna Antonova (Russian: Саша Михайловна Антонова; born 5 February 1979), known professionally as Sasha Gradiva, is a Russian-born American singer, songwriter, producer, and performing artist. Her music is a blend of pop dance with infusions of electronica. She began her professional career at the age of 16, and has gained recognition within the European music scene, on MTV and in the Russian music industry.

Making a transition to the US music scene, Sasha attracted press attention when attending at the 54th Annual Grammy Awards. Gradiva met American producer Tricky Stewart and soon after released her first US single "Wanted". It was co-written with Justin Tranter of Semi Precious Weapons and produced by Stewart and Norwegian producer Axident. She has gained recognition within the club dance scene and has been referred to by Hot Spot Magazine and Gay Pride as "one of the most promising artists in the mainstream US music scene."

== Career ==
Sasha, Gradiva's self-titled debut solo album, was released by ARS Records. It produced six hit singles that propelled her to stardom. Sasha followed up the impressive success of her debut solo album with yet another hit record- Say My Name with Love. Gradiva has appeared in the pages of the Russian publications of Cosmopolitan, Maxim and Vogue. Skum's lead guitarist John Eaton, is impressed with Sasha's commitment to not lip sync, has been quoted saying, "Sasha doesn't go that route and makes it live, the way it should be. I like her style and she is going to be a huge star."

Gradiva was the first Russian artist to be invited to the Grammy Awards in 2012, where she wore a pink gown with a gun sleeve, causing a media frenzy. Dubbed "The Gun Girl" at the Grammys, stories circulated in outlets that included Rolling Stone Magazine, US Weekly, Entertainment Weekly, The Hollywood Reporter, The New York Times and The Wall Street Journal, among others, that quickly gained her the reputation of being a showstopper. When asked to explain the meaning behind her ensemble, she has said that she was calling all countries to submit their weapons for fashion and artistic expression.

Her singles "Pandemonium" and "I'm on Fire" were placed on MTV Network, but it was her collaboration with Semi Precious Weapons' lead singer Justin Tranter, as well as recorder producer Tricky Stewart, for her debut U.S single release, Wanted that put her on the US map. Wanted was released on February 25, 2012, nearly one month after the media frenzy that followed her appearance at the 54th Annual Grammy Awards in a pink gown and Terminator-esque arm sleeve. "Wanted" reached No. 3 on Billboard's Hot Dance Single Sales chart and #5 on their overall Hot Single Sales chart in 2012, further proving she is well on her way to matching her European success in the U.S.

Gradiva spent all of 2013 and part of 2014 touring the entire US, and hit all 50 states, gaining a large fan base in America. She put on shows across the country to crowds of over 300,000 and has shared stages with the likes of Adam Lambert, Icona Pop, Cher Lloyd and Emeli Sande among others. Her latest single "Tin Foil" has been well received in the UK, and charted at #10 in the Music Week Upfront Club Chart, while its Super Stylers Remix charted at #12. Gradiva remains upfront and center as a fashionista in the media, and is popular among household media names like Hollywood Life, Radar Online, OK!, Star, National Enquirer, People, and many others.

Sasha lives in Los Angeles, California with her daughter Uma, where she is spending most her time in the studio working on new music for her fans. In May 2016 Gradiva announced that she will be partnering with Jolie Jewelry for her new "Gun Girl" jewelry line that's set to be sold online and in a few select stores, including H. Lorenzo and Fred Segal.

== Political views ==
In 2014, Gradiva condemned Russia's controversial anti-gay law in an interview with The Huffington Post. Her strong sense of self paired with an equally strong voice and set of liberal political views, has made her an icon in the LGBT dance scene. She most recently took a stand against the racial injustices that took place in Baltimore, Spring of 2015, by putting on a show at the House of Blues Sunset Strip in West Hollywood, called "No Color Just Shine." Gradiva is also rumored to be pairing up with controversial artist ChadMichael C Morrisette for a creative collaboration, possibly in honor of the Orlando Pulse shooting victims.

She supports the Russian invasion of Ukraine.

== Discography ==
=== Studio albums ===
- Sasha (2003)
- Pozovi Lyubya (2005)
- "Tin Foil EP" (2016)

=== Singles ===
- "Wanted" (2012)
- "I'm on Fire" (2012)
- "Come with Us" (2013)
- "Come with Us (No Big Deal Remix)" (2013)
- "Unbreakable" (2015)
- "Tin Foil" (2016)
- "Tin Foil (Super Stylers Remix)" (2016)
