= Seltso (rural locality type) =

Seltso (Russian: сельцо; Polish: siołko) was a type of rural locality in the Polish–Lithuanian Commonwealth and the Russian Empire.

In the Polish–Lithuanian Commonwealth, the term referred to a small standalone khutor (hamlet), which often served as a unit into which a volost was subdivided. On the territory of Russia proper, this type of settlement was most common in Smolensk lands. The population of a typical seltso tended to be quite small, often limited to one or several families, or sometimes even just one person.

In the later periods, the term was used to refer to a peasant settlement without a church around a landowner's estate.

== See also ==
- Village#Russia
- Types of inhabited localities in Russia
