= Gold Coast Historic District (Richland, Washington) =

Historic district in Washington, United States

- U.S. National Register of Historic Places
- U.S. Historic district
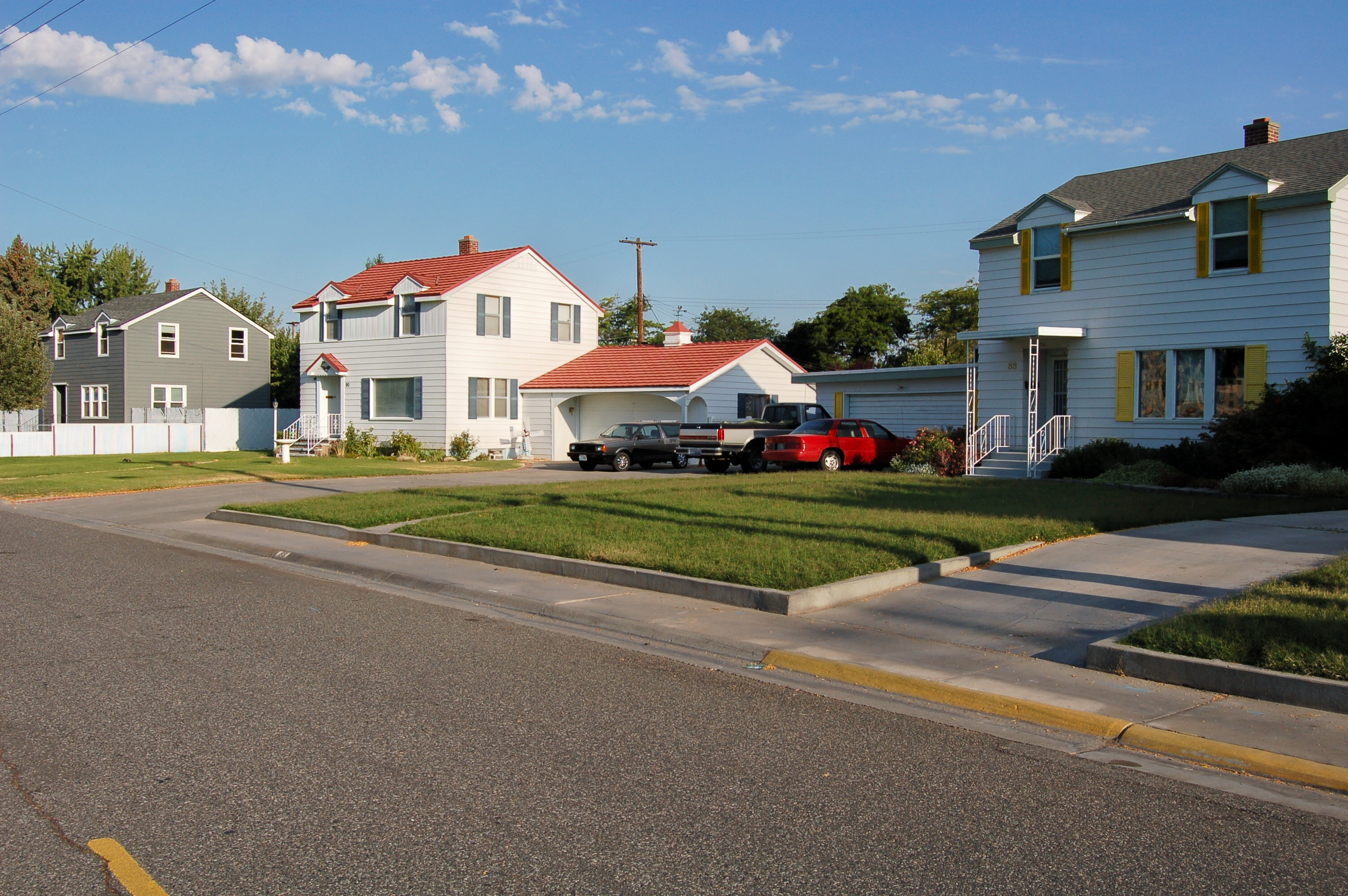
- F-type letter houses in 2007

- Location within Washington (state)

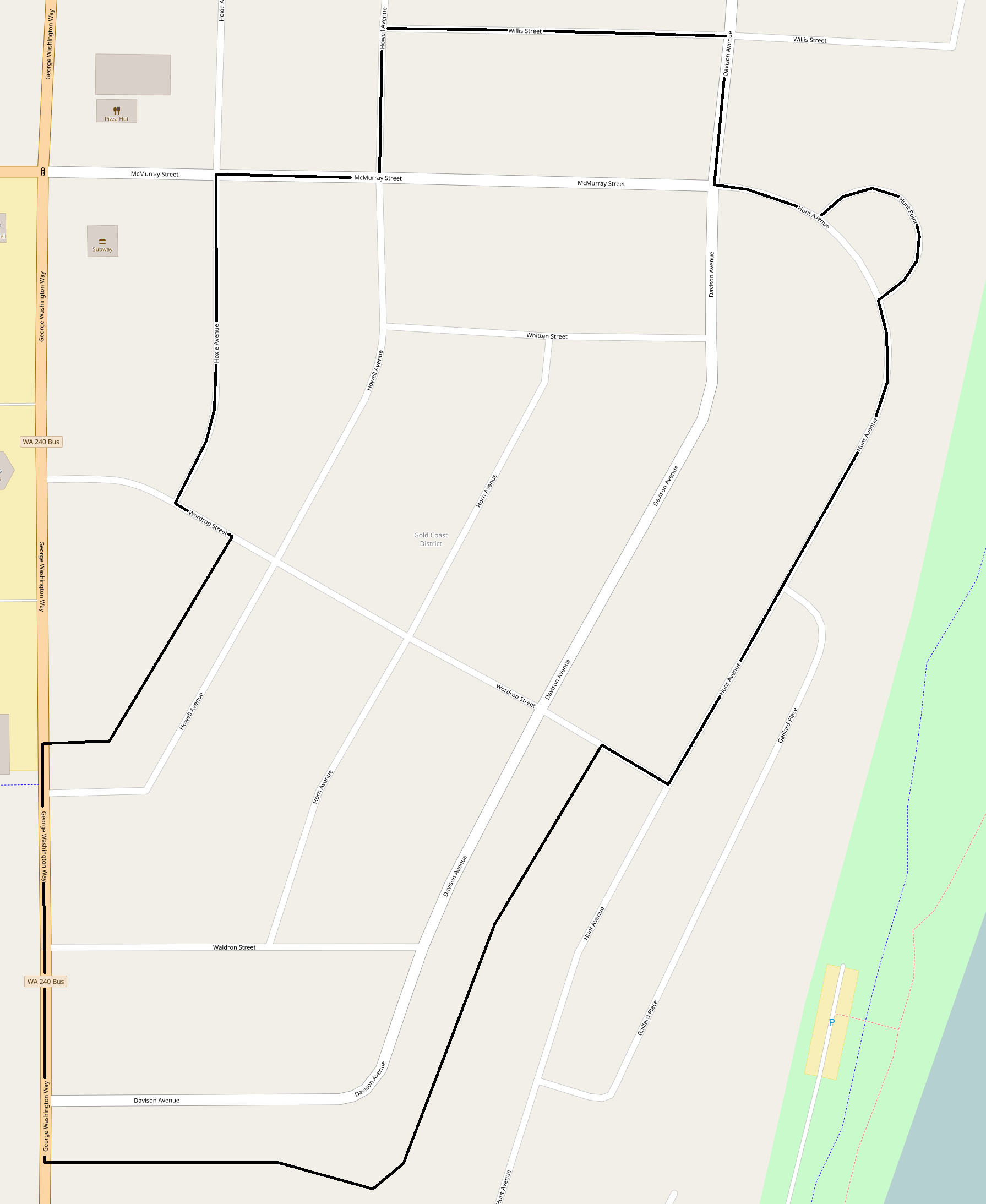
- Location: Roughly bounded by Willis Street to the north, Davison Avenue and Hunt Avenue to the east, Davison Avenue to the south, and George Washington Way to the west, Richland, Washington
- Coordinates: 46°17′52″N 119°16′17″W
- Area: 890 acres (360 ha)
- Built: 1948-49
- Architect: Gustav Albin Pehrson; Hoffman Smith and Wight Company; et al.
- Architectural style: Modern Movement
- NRHP reference No.: 04000315
- Added to NRHP: March 7, 2005

The Gold Coast Historic District is a residential area in Richland, Washington, United States, the town that was built during the World War II Manhattan Project to house workers at the Hanford atomic plant. The homes within the district date from 1948 to 1949 and are associated with the Cold War expansion of plutonium manufacturing at the plant.

== History ==
From its inception in 1943, when it displaced the existing village at the site, wartime Richland grew to a population of 25,000 by 1945. It was built up rapidly in stages under a master plan that covered residential areas, commercial centers and government facilities along with all related infrastructure. Housing was built in tracts and clustered by demographic (apartments for singles, houses for families, etc.) and, to some extent, income. All land and buildings were owned by the government. Residents paid a nominal rent and were assigned their units through waiting lists. Because homes were allocated based on family size and need, there were a number of floor plans available. These were each identified by a letter of the alphabet, and so came to be known as "alphabet" houses.

With the advent of the Cold War, plutonium production at the Hanford plant was ramped up, resulting in a need for increased staffing of the technical and administrative ranks. This in turn created a need for new housing in Richland. Accordingly, new neighborhoods were created in 1948–49. The historic district comprises one of these neighborhoods. Because the housing was intended for upper-income families and was near the Columbia River, it came to be known as the "Gold Coast." The moniker was in use for the area as early as 1952.

The motivation for seeking a place in the National Register arose from an inventory of 5000 of the alphabet houses prepared in the early 2000s by local residents interested in documenting the unique aspects of Richland's built environment. In 2004, the Governor's Advisory Council on Historic Preservation (GACHP) began reviewing the city's Gold Coast Historic District preservation application. The district, comprising 118 contributing and 45 noncontributing properties was added to the National Register of Historic Places in 2005.

== See also ==
- National Register of Historic Places listings in Benton County, Washington
