= Classification of inhabited localities in Russia =

The classification system of inhabited localities in Russia and some other post-Soviet states has certain peculiarities compared with those in other countries.

== Classes ==
During the Soviet time, each of the republics of the Soviet Union, including the Russian SFSR, had its own legislative documents dealing with classification of inhabited localities. After the Dissolution of the Soviet Union, the task of developing and maintaining such classification in Russia was delegated to the federal subjects. While currently there are certain peculiarities to classifications used in many federal subjects, they are all still largely based on the system used in the RSFSR. In all federal subjects, the inhabited localities are classified into two major categories: urban and rural. Further divisions of these categories vary slightly from one federal subject to another, but they all follow common trends described below.

=== Urban ===
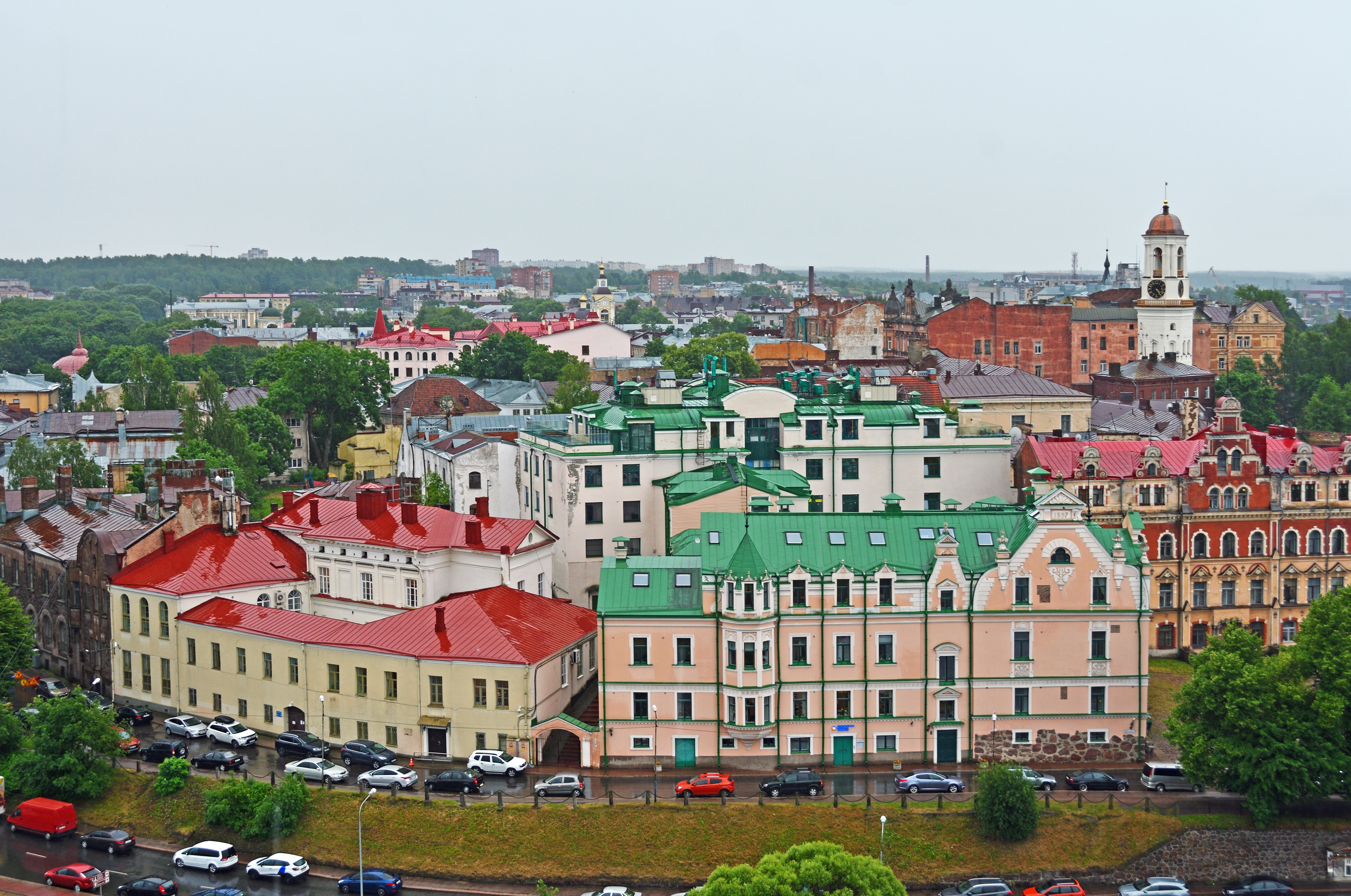
Vyborg, a town (gorod) in the Leningrad Oblast

- Cities and towns (город, gorod; pl. города, goroda). Cities and towns are classified by their level of jurisdiction (district/federal subject/federal). The Russian language has no separate words for "town" and "city" ("город" is used for both).
- Urban-type settlements (посёлок городского типа, posyolok gorodskogo tipa; pl. посёлки городского типа) is a type of smaller urban locality. This type of urban locality was first introduced in the Soviet Union in 1924, with the following subcategories:
  - Urban-type settlement proper—mostly urban population of 3,000–12,000.
    - Workers' settlement (рабочий посёлок, rabochy posyolok)—mostly urban population occupied in industrial manufacture.
    - Suburban (dacha) settlement (дачный посёлок, dachny posyolok)—typically, a suburban settlement with summer dachas.
    - Resort settlement (курортный посёлок, kurortny posyolok)—mostly urban population occupied in services to holidaymakers (on the seaside or a mineral water spa, or in the mountains for walks and alpine skiing).
    - Shift settlements for shift method work.

In 1957, the procedures for categorizing urban-type settlements were further refined.

=== Rural ===
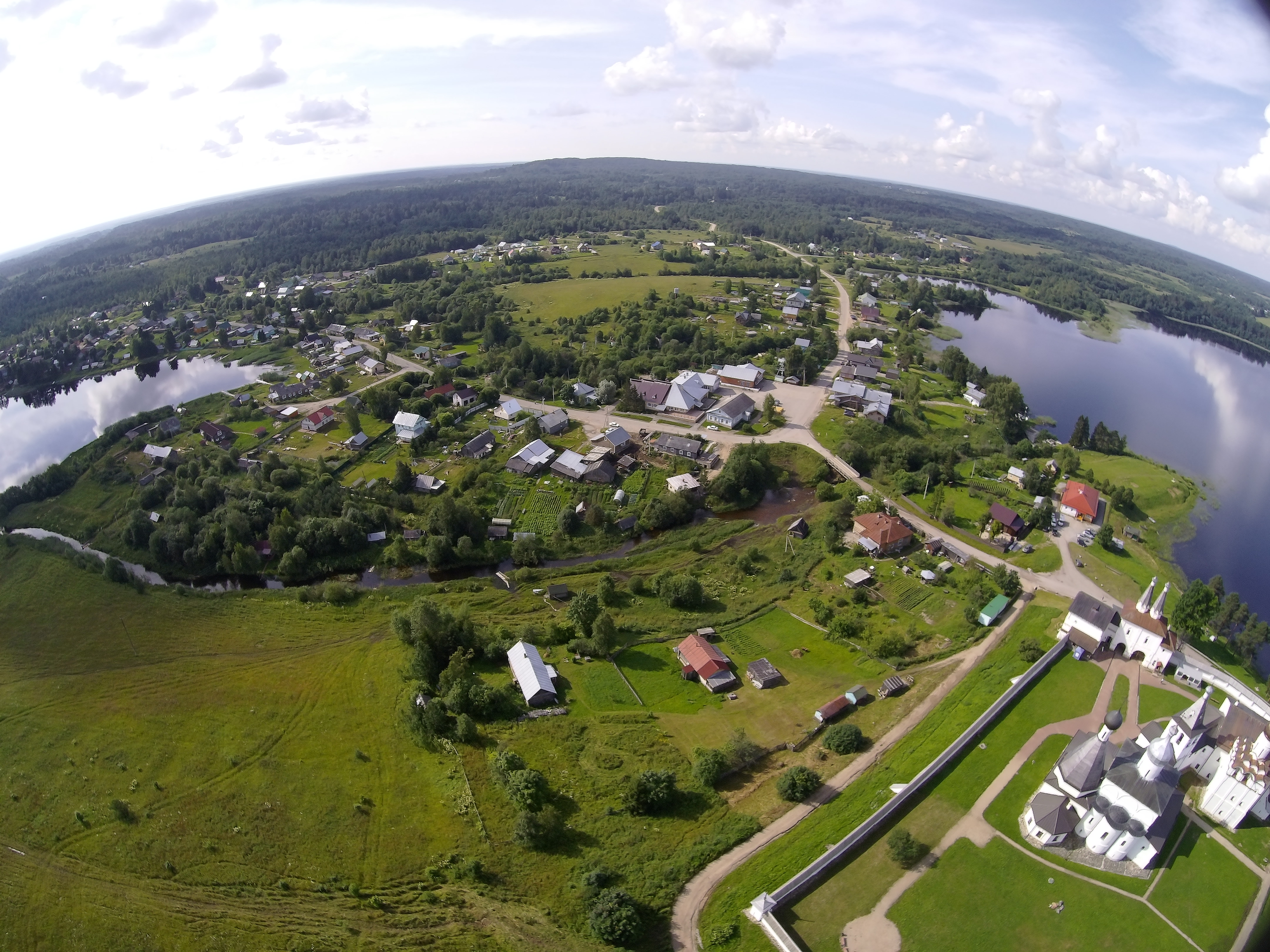
Ferapontovo, a village (selo) in the Vologda Oblast

Multiple types of rural localities exist, some common through the whole territory of Russia, some specific to certain federal subjects. The most common types include:

- Derevnyas (деревня, derevnya; pl. деревни, derevni), hamlets
- Selos (село, selo; pl. сёла, syola), villages (historically, ones with an Orthodox church).
- Stanitsas (станица, stanitsa; pl. станицы, stanitsy), villages (historically, Cossack rural settlements)
- Khutor (хутор), small hamlets, only in some federal subjects
- Slobodas (слобода, sloboda; pl. слободы, slobody), villages (historically, settlements freed from taxes and levies)
- (Rural-type) settlements (посёлок (сельского типа), posyolok (selskogo tipa); pl. посёлки (сельского типа)). The "rural-type" (сельского типа) designation is added to the settlements the population of which is mostly occupied in agriculture, while posyolok (посёлок) proper indicates a mix of population working in agriculture and industry.

=== Historical ===
- Krepost (крепость, a fort), a fortified settlement
  - A kremlin (кремль, citadel), a major krepost, usually including a castle and surrounded by a posad
  - An ostrog, a more primitive kind of krepost which could be put up quickly within rough walls of debarked pointed timber
- Posad (посад), a medieval suburban settlement
- Mestechko (местечко, from Polish: miasteczko), a small town in the Western Krai annexed during the partitions of Poland; typically a mestechko would have a Jewish majority and such towns are referred to in English by the Yiddish term shtetl
- Pogost
- Seltso, a type of rural locality in the Russian Empire and the Polish–Lithuanian Commonwealth
- Pochinok (починок, pochinok; pl. починки, pochinki), a newly formed rural locality of one or several families. Pochinoks were established as new settlements and usually grow into larger villages as they developed.

== See also ==
- City of federal subject significance
- List of terms for administrative divisions
- Lists of rural localities in Russia
- Political divisions of Russia
- Town of district significance
