= Moscow electoral district =

Constituency of the Russian Republic

Moscow
- Former Civilian constituency for the All-Russian Constituent Assembly
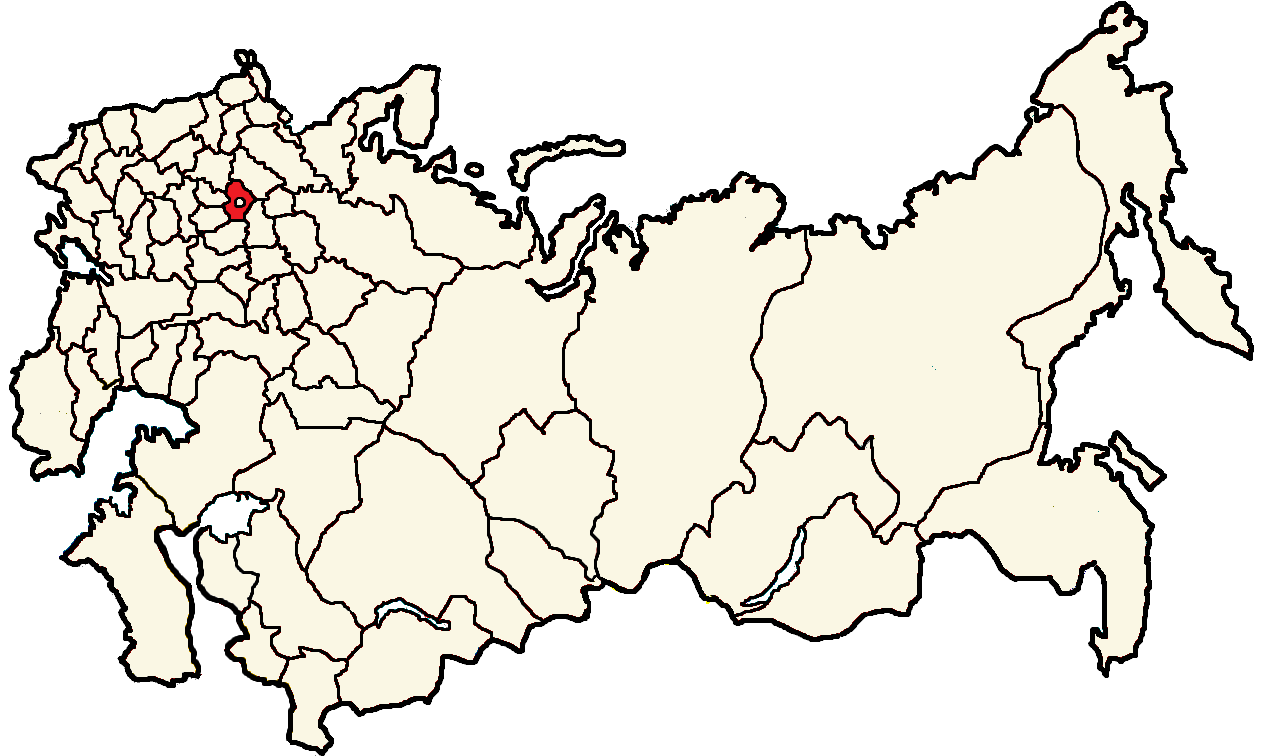

Former constituency
- Created: 1917
- Abolished: 1918
- Number of members: 9
- Number of Uyezd Electoral Commissions: 13
- Number of Urban Electoral Commissions: -
- Number of Parishes: 167

The Moscow electoral district (Russian: Московский избирательный округ) was a constituency created for the 1917 Russian Constituent Assembly election. The electoral district covered the Moscow Governorate, except for the city of Moscow.

According to the account of U.S. historian Oliver Henry Radkey, which constitutes the source for the results table below, only few votes were missing from the summary (one military voting box in Moscow uezd, the votes from a single volost in Bronnitsy uezd and the votes for smaller parties in Serpukhov uezd).

== Results ==
Moscow Province
Party	Vote	%
List 5 - Bolsheviks- Menshevik-Internationalists	351,853	56.43
List 3 - Socialist-Revolutionaries	159,630	25.60
List 1 - Kadets	43,295	6.94
List 4 - Mensheviks	27,108	4.35
List 6 - All-Russian Peasants Union	12,967	2.08
List 10 - Group of Public Figures (rightists)	8,443	1.35
List 9 - Old Believers	7,467	1.20
List 2 - Popular Socialists	6,058	0.97
List 7 - Democratic Non-partisan Group of Members of District Committees of Sergiev Posad	4,497	0.72
List 8 - Landowners	2,189	0.35
Total:	623,507	

Deputies Elected
Dolgorukov	Kadet
Bykov	SR
Pavlov	SR
Baryshnikov	Bolshevik
Kokushkin	Bolshevik
Nogin	Bolshevik
Sapronov	Bolshevik
Smirnov	Bolshevik
