= Bronnitsy =

Town in Moscow Oblast, Russia

Bronnitsy Бронницы
- Town
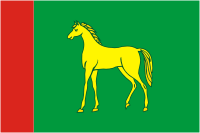
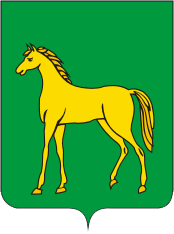
- Flag Coat of arms
- Interactive map of Bronnitsy
- Location of Bronnitsy Bronnitsy (Moscow Oblast)
- Coordinates: 55°25′34″N 38°15′54″E
- Country: Russia
- Federal subject: Moscow Oblast
- Known since: 1453
- Town status since: 1780s

Government
  - Mayor: Viktor Nevolin
- Elevation: 120 m (390 ft)

Population (2010 Census)
  - Total: 21,102
  - Estimate (2025): 21,050 (−0.2%)

Administrative status
  - Subordinated to: Bronnitsy Town Under Oblast Jurisdiction
  - Capital of: Bronnitsy Town Under Oblast Jurisdiction

Municipal status
  - Urban okrug: Bronnitsy Urban Okrug
  - Capital of: Bronnitsy Urban Okrug
- Time zone: UTC+3 (MSK)
- Postal code: 140170
- Dialing code: +7 49646
- OKTMO ID: 46705000001
- Website: bronnitsy.ru

Bronnitsy (Russian: Бро́нницы) is a town in Moscow Oblast, Russia, located 54.5 kilometers (33.9 mi) southeast of central Moscow and 13 kilometers (8.1 mi) west of the Bronnitsy station on the Moscow–Ryazan railroad. The town is surrounded by Ramensky District but is administratively incorporated as a town under oblast jurisdiction. Population: 21,831 (2021 census).

Local economy relies on food processing and packaging, construction services and jewellery manufacturing. Bronnitsy is listed among the twenty-two historical towns of Moscow Oblast.

Existence of Bronnitsy is attested since 1453. The village emerged as a stopover station on the highway between Moscow and Ryazan (present-day M5 road), and its population and economy traditionally tended to horses. The House of Romanov stables, established in Bronnitsy by 1634, evolved into stud farms supplying riding horses to the cavalry. In the 1780s the administrative reform of Catherine the Great turned the village into a proper small town with a grid plan and a growing merchant community. In the second half of the 19th century Bronnitsy was gradually industrialized, becoming a town of small textile mills and jewelers.

Bronnitsy had a minor role in the military history of the Time of Troubles and Napoleon's invasion of Russia, when it became the farthest point of French advance after the fall of Moscow, but were spared from military action and destruction. Its key landmarks are the five-domed cathedral of Archangel Michael (completed in 1705), the church of Entry into Jerusalem (1845) and the neoclassical cavalry barracks.

== Etymology ==
Toponyms starting with Bron- (plural Bronnitsy, Broniki; singular Bronnikovo, Brontsa etc.) are common to all Eastern Slavic territories, from Bronytsia in Lviv Oblast of Ukraine to Bronnikovo in Chita Oblast of Russia. Each of these towns and villages has a different etymology behind its name. In case of Bronnitsy in Moscow Oblast, all proposed versions were contested and none gained a solid preference of the historians.

- The most popular version derives Bronnitsy from bron' (modern Russian: броня, armor), suggesting that Bronnitsy was a settlement of armorers. This version, however, contradicts history of medieval Bronnitsy.
- Distantly related explanations suggest the existence of a notable bronnik - an armored warrior, or a person named Bronislav.
- Another explanation connects Bronnitsy to bran' (брань, fight or battle), referring to the struggle against Tatars.
- The most plausible version derives Bronnitsy from obsolete bronka, a word originally meaning oat spikes, later spikes of any cultivated cereal. Bronnitsy emerged as a station on a yam highway, and its grain caches were essential for feeding yam horses. Bronnitsy, presumably, were the feeding troughs placed along the highway.

The latter version is supported by the fact that another, and older, village once named Bronnitsy, present-day Bronnitsa on Msta River, also evolved as a yam station.

== Geography ==
The historical center of Bronnitsy stands on the southern bank of narrow and shallow Lake Belskoe, a former path of the Moskva River that is now completely cut off from the river. Narrow and flat land between the lake and the river is in part occupied by fifteen soccer fields and the Olympic Reserve school, specializing in training rowing athletes; the lake itself serves as a rowing channel. Two small islands on the lake are uninhabited, the lake itself is spanned with a pedestrian suspension bridge.

The Moscow-Ryazan road, which once ran through Bronnitsy, now bypasses the city center north of the A-107 Ring Road and returns to the old track south from it. Sovetskaya Street, the segment of the M5 road that passed through Bronnitsy, is still an important street, passing through the town center. A-107, the main east-west corridor, crosses the city and Moskva River a few blocks south from Lake Belskoye. The old and narrow bridge across the Moskva River causes traffic queues that have sometimes reached 10 kilometers (6.2 mi). In August 2008, the poor condition of the bridge due to its extensive usage led to a ban on truck and heavy bus traffic over the bridge, further aggravating congestion. One year later the town administration agreed to proceed with the construction of a second two-lane bridge next to the old one, but no funds have yet been firmly allocated.

Most of the town's territory retained traditional single-family houses. Midrise housing concentrates in the southern part of Bronnitsy along A-107.

== History ==
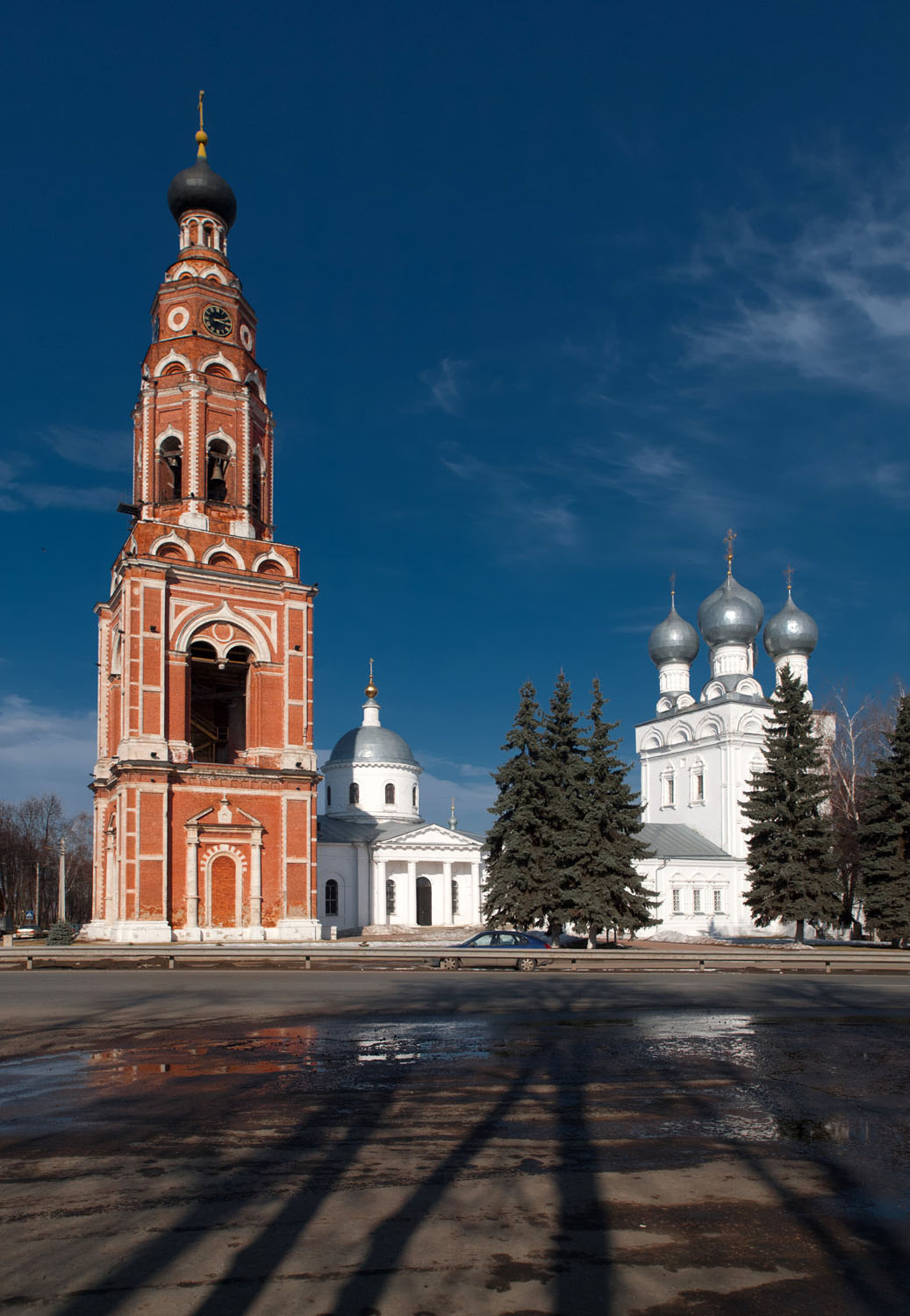
Cathedral Square with the 73-meter (240 ft) tall belltower

=== Rurikids and early Romanovs (1453–1780) ===
Bronnitsy were first mentioned, as Bronniche (Бронниче) in the 1453 testament of Sophia of Lithuania; she bequeathed Bronnitsy and other villages of her private domain around Kolomna to her grandson Yury. Wars of the 15th and 16th centuries spared the village; the first, although insignificant, military action took place during the Time of Troubles. In 1606, prince Vasily Mosalsky troops, engaged against Ivan Bolotnikov's rebels, passed three versts from Bronnitsy. In 1618 Hetman Petro Konashevych-Sahaidachny, acting in accord with Władysław IV Vasa, stayed in Bronnitsy on his march from Serpukhov to Moscow.

Mikhail Romanov owned Bronnitsy as his private domain, and kept there royal stables with up to 190 horses (the first written evidence of Tsar's stables in Bronnitsy is dated 1634). Romanovs of the 17th century maintained Bronnitsy merely as a household item and the village evolved in relative prosperity, evidenced by the construction of the Cathedral of Archangel Michael, launched in the 1690s and completed in 1705. Peter the Great reformed it into a productive stud farm. He granted Bronnitsy to Alexander Menshikov; after his fall in 1727 control over the village and government-owned stud farms passed to statesman Pavel Yaguzhinsky who "managed" the business into a ruin. Statesman Artemy Volynsky, Yaguzhinsky's nemesis, took control of the stud farms in 1733. The business recovered slowly; by the time of Volynsky's treason trial in 1740 the farm in Bronnitsy had 221 horse and specialized into breeding riding horses. The next manager, Alexander Kurakin, increased the number of horses to 277 in less than a decade.

Microhistory of Bronnitsy of the period, despite substantial surviving archives, has not been properly collated and published yet. Everyday life of the town in the 17th and 18th centuries remains, largely, unknown, apart from a few unusual events that attracted attention of the imperial government. For example, when nearby Kolomna was hit by the plague of 1770–1772, the priests of Bronnitsy refused to respect quarantine enforced by civil authorities and kept on organizing potentially hazardous mass processions. The Holy Synod had to press on archbishop Feodosy who, in turn, personally pressed the priests into obedience.

=== Growth and the French invasion ===
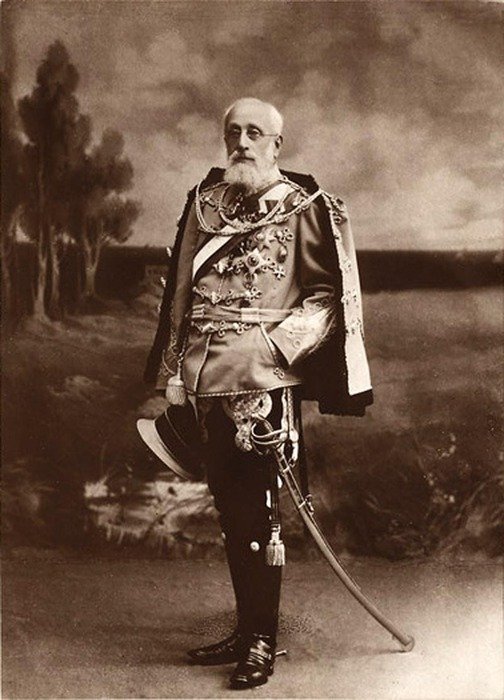
Alexander Pushkin (son of the poet), pictured here as an old man, administered peasant reform in Bronnitsy in his thirties

In 1781, Bronnitsy, then having a population of five hundred, became the administrative center of an uyezd of Moscow Governorate. Catherine the Great granted the former village a town charter and a coat of arms featuring golden horse on a green field, a nod to Bronnitsy stud farms. Influx of petty bureaucrats resulted in a significant growth in population and construction of the first public buildings; the new grid plan was approved in 1784 and by 1787 population tripled. It leveled at around 1,500 until the middle of the 19th century.

In September 1812, Bronnitsy and Bogorodsk became the farthest points reached by the French troops in Napoleon's invasion of Russia. After the surrender of Moscow on September 14, the main Russian Army retreated south-east along the Ryazan road, "cautiously" shadowed by Murat's cavalry. On September 17 Kutuzov made a sharp westward turn to Podolsk; a small task force continued movement to Ryazan, impersonating the whole army. Murat missed Kutuzov's turn and did not discover the deception until he reached Bronnitsy. Although by September 21 Napoleon suspected the Russian maneuver, the French lost the track of the Russian Army for two days and waged a wide pursuit that culminated in the Battle of Tarutino. Murat's raid, accompanied with inevitable plunder and fires, was the last foreign incursion into Bronnitsy ever (World War II spared the town).

After the war of 1812, Bronnitsy slowly evolved as a typical small trading town and served as a base of a cavalry regiment; the former cavalry barracks, built in Empire style, are attributed either to Vasily Stasov or to Alexander Kutepov. Rotunda of Jerusalem church, standing near the Cathedral of Archangel Michael, was built in the 1840s by Alexander Shestakov in late neoclassical style. Its pseudo-Russian red brick belltower was erected in the 1850s in apparent mismatch to historical churches. These landmarks survived despite a number of sweeping fires; the worst recorded fire of 1861 destroyed 115 houses. Another major fire struck in 1863, yet despite the damages Bronnitsy still had one inn, two pubs, and 118 trading outlets; two hundred families held trading patents but the town's finances were poor and could not even pay for paving the unbearably impassable main square.

In the 1850s and 1860s, Bronnitsy became home to notable members of the declining Russian nobility. Decembrist Mikhail Fonvizin (1787–1854) and his wife Natalya, a local landowner, retired to Bronnitsy after exile to Siberia. Fonvizin died soon upon return; the widow married another decembrist, Ivan Pushchin (1798–1859). Both Fonvizin and Pushchin were buried near the Cathedral of Archangel. Retired Army colonel Alexander Pushkin (1833–1914), son of poet Alexander Pushkin, served as the justice of the peace in Bronnitsy in 1862–1866, administering the Emancipation reform of 1861. His son, also Alexander Pushkin (1863–1916), born in Bronnitsy, became judge of Bronnitsy uezd (Russian: Земский начальник) in 1890 and since 1897 later managed the whole zemstvo of the town and country.

=== Industrialization ===
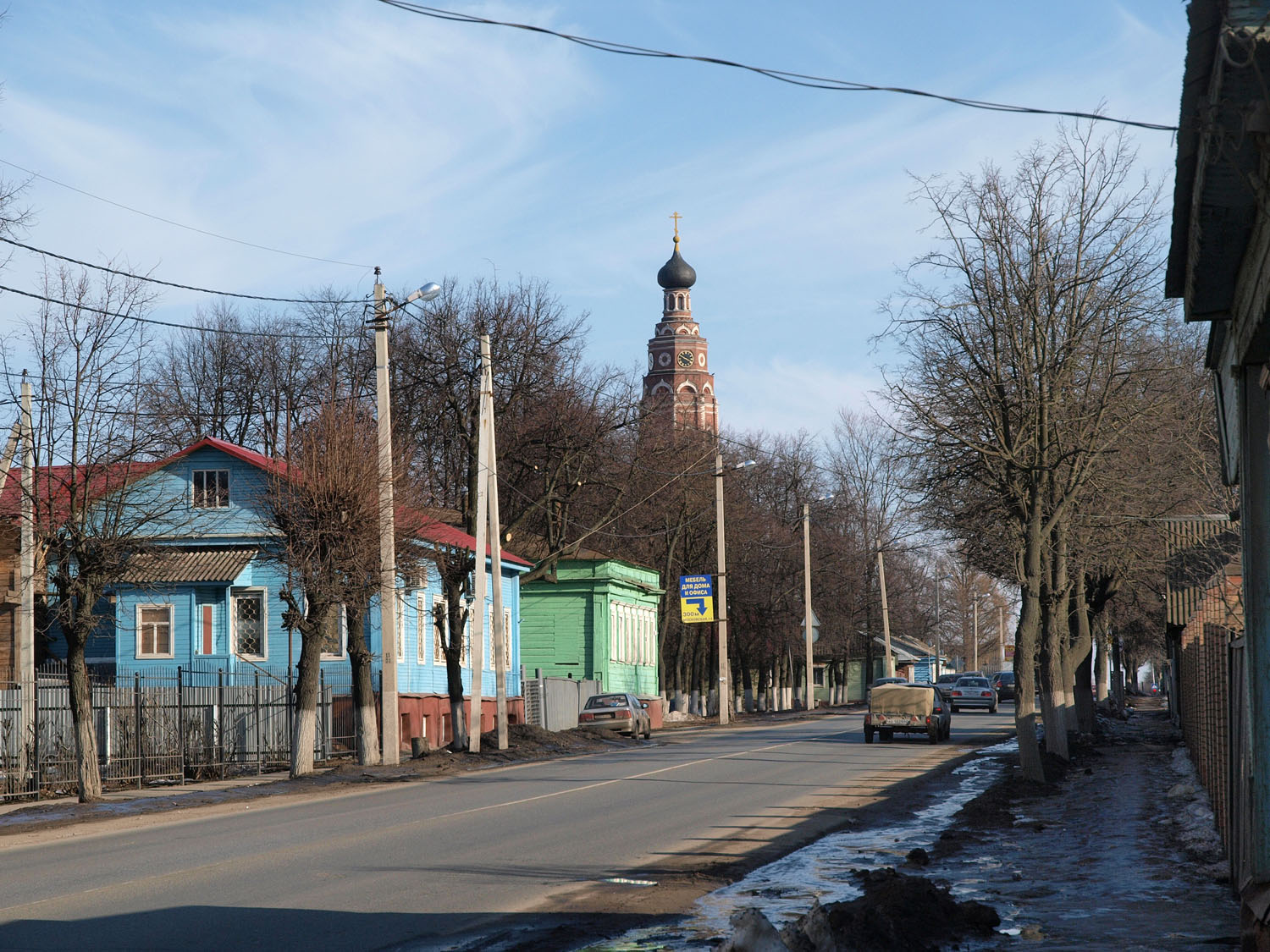
Main street of Bronnitsy, the Sovetskaya street

Railroad boom of the 1860s bypassed Bronnitsy: eponymous Bronnitsy railroad station, operating since 1864, was actually built 12 versts (13 km) from the center of the town, on the opposite bank of the river. The dam and bridge across the river were built by local contractor Smorchkov in 1872. Residents were eagerly leaving Bronnitsy for industrial and service jobs in Moscow: by 1882, Bronnitsky, Podolsky, Serpukhovsky, and Moskovsky Uezds were the leading suppliers of manpower to the metropolis. Bronnitsky Uyezd was sending twice as many men as densely populated and far better industrialized Bogorodsky Uyezd.

Relative share of migrants to total population, however, was less than in the western uyezds of Moscow Governorate. Bronnitsy gradually became a minor textile industry hub and its factories employed a substantial share of the remaining population, especially under-age girls. By the end of the 19th century one quarter of all local girls under the age of twelve and 65% of the girls under the age of fourteen were employed in the industry, compared to only 7% and 23% for Volokolamsky Uyezd. Jewelers emerged in Bronnitsky Uyezd earlier, in the middle of the 19th century, and by 1900 there were 737 independent, predominantly male craftsmen. The largest jewellery business, in nearby Sinkovo, employed around twenty workers. Cost of living in Bronnitsy was very low, at least according to imperial government: the 1902 Army regulations placed it in the seventh grade of housing costs—just a notch above the cheapest eighth grade, or two and a half times cheaper than Moscow and Odessa.

Mayor Alexander Pushkin (the third) struggled to improve the performance of peasant households; increase in average area of a family lot, he reasoned, would enable a switch from obsolete three-field crop rotation to intensive farming methods. He set up five model farms attended by qualified agronomists and provided subsidized loans to the peasants. In twenty years of his tenure, the uyezd opened twenty-five new elementary schools, two high schools for boys, and one high school for girls. Despite Pushkin's efforts, cultural split between landed peasants and urbanized classes widened to a point of armed conflict. During the 1905 Russian Revolution liberal-minded teachers and medics supported the political changes while the peasants distrusted their promises, fearing a return to dreaded serfdom system. On one occasion the peasants stormed and burnt down a school building housing a convention of zemstvo employees who barely escaped the mob.

The town slowly grew until World War I. By 1914, Bronnitsy hospital acquired an X-ray machine, one of the first in the region. According to Bronnitsy Museum staff, in 1914 the Fifth Air Company of Bronnitsy operated from a military airfield near the town; local pilot Konstantin Savitsky, distantly related to the Pushkin family, and lieutenant Mikhail Lyaschenko were killed there in an accident in April 1914. In November 1914, the company left Bronnitsy; a different air wing was based there from 1917 to 1919. According to pilot Ivan Spirin, in 1924 Moscow-Bronnitsy-Moscow route was used to test new instrument flying technologies.

=== Soviet period ===
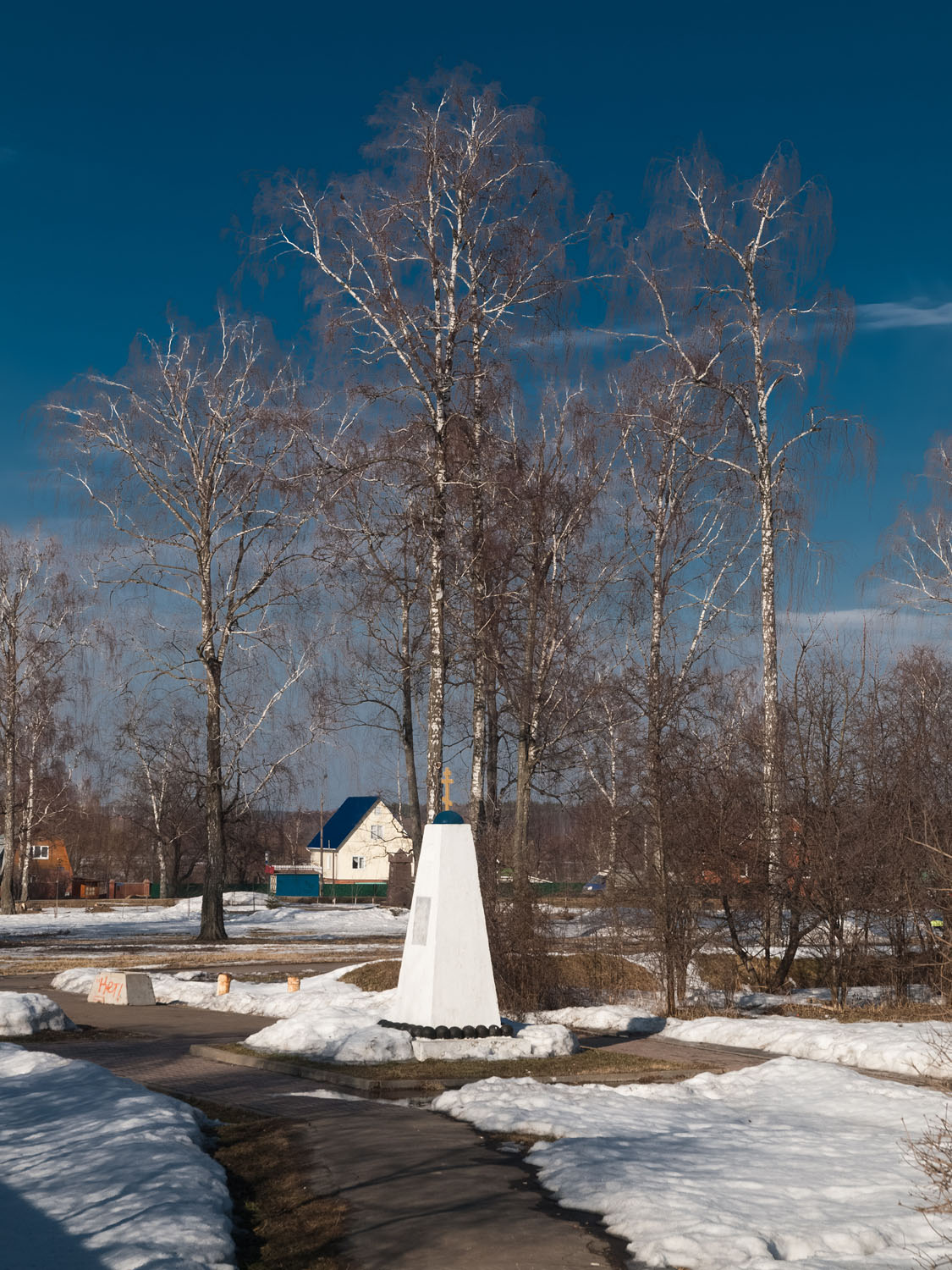
Monument to the fallen soldiers, installed in 1916, is all that remains of the town's old cemetery

In the 1920s, the town housed two competing cells of the Militant Atheists Union reporting directly to the national Union in Moscow. Population, however, remained superstitious: in 1926 Bronnitsy were swept with an outbreak of alleged demonic possession blamed on a local homosexual healer. The temples of Bronnitsy were closed in the 1930s and used as archives; they were struck off heritage register during Nikita Khrushchev's anti-religious campaign, but survived to date. Religion persisted, sometimes literally underground: parents of Alexey Vdovin (born 1958) belonged to the Catacomb Church (in the 1980s, Vdovin himself initiated destruction of monument to Vladimir Lenin and repossession of churches in his hometown; he became a radical nationalist, activist of Pamyat and co-founder of the Russian National Union).

Human losses of Bronnitsy during the terror campaigns of the 1930s have been only partially estimated. By 2007, 300 out of 31,000 victims of political terror in Moscow Oblast were identified as residents of Bronnitsy.

During World War II, Bronnitsy served as the southern vortex of Moscow's inner radar arc; the 337th air defense battalion, equipped with RUS-1 Reven (later RUS-2 and RUS-2c) radars, was based there since March 1941. In 1945, Bronnitsy housed one of five displaced persons camps for the repatriation of American and British prisoners of war from the USSR. Front-line action did not reach Bronnitsy but the town and country lost so many men that after the war the government resorted to returning "political" prisoners of Gulag to take up administrative jobs.

On April 16, 1964, Bronnitsy witnessed a mass riot after a local resident died in police custody. A mob of around 300 attacked the jail; police did not dare to use firearms and there were no more casualties. Eight of the protesters were prosecuted in court. It was added to the list of the historical towns of the Moscow Oblast in 1990, and gained the status of a city of regional subordination, along with a new charter, in 1992. A gas explosion occurred in a five-story apartment at 15:45 on October 17, 2011, resulting in two people killed and fifteen wounded. It was apparently due to human error.

== Administrative and municipal status ==
Within the framework of administrative divisions, it is incorporated as Bronnitsy Town Under Oblast Jurisdiction—an administrative unit with the status equal to that of the districts. As a municipal division, Bronnitsy Town Under Oblast Jurisdiction is incorporated as Bronnitsy Urban Okrug.

== Demographics ==
- 1780: 500
- 1787: 1,500
- 1836: 1,500
- 1897: 3,800
- 1926: 3,800
- 1939: 6,100
- 1959: 10,100
- 1967: 11,900
- 1979: 14,200
- 1989: 16,057
- 2002: 18,232
- 2007: 18,600
- 2010: 21,102
- 2021: 21,831
- 2023: 21,294
- 2024: 20,981

== Economy ==
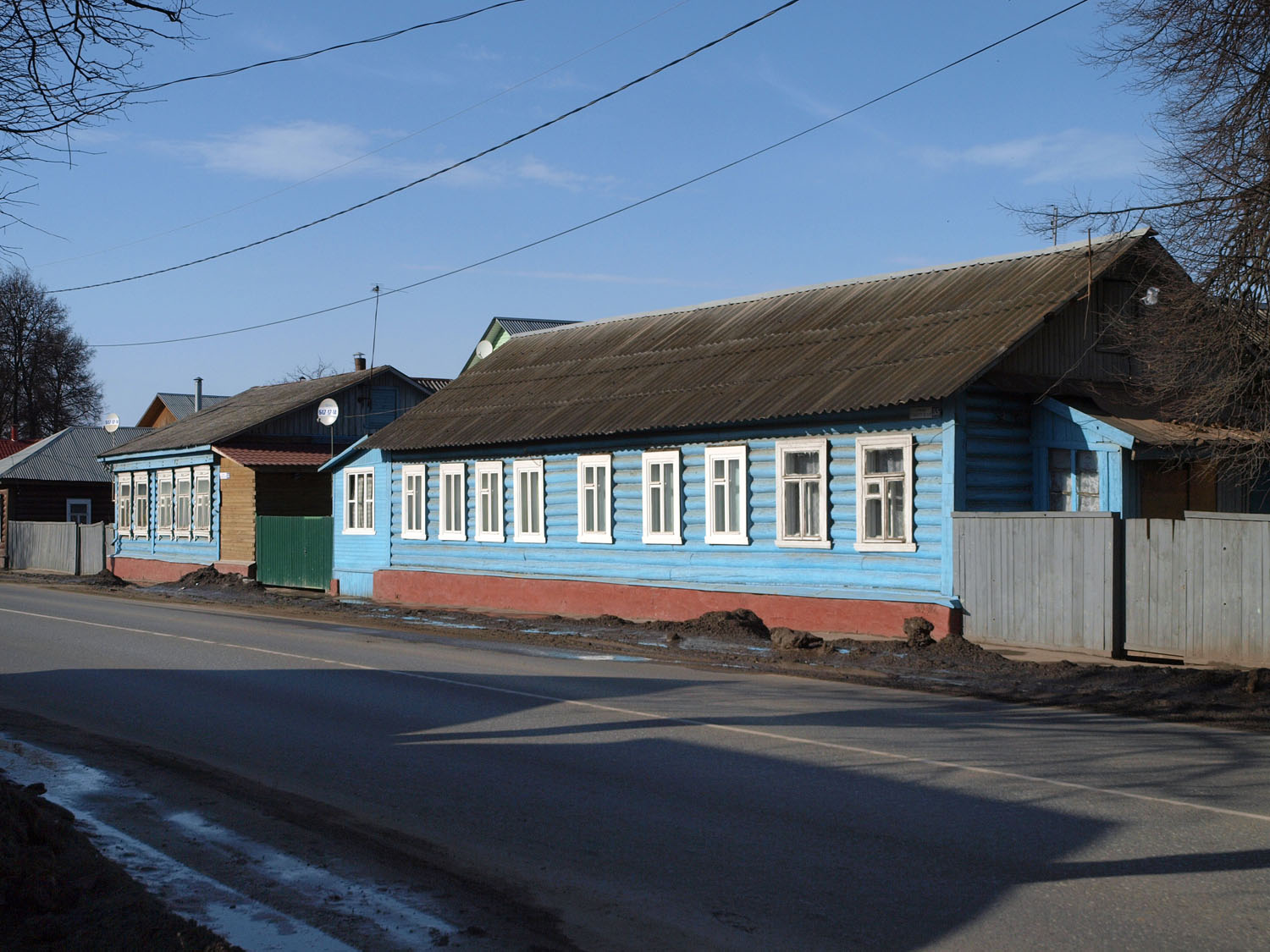
Buildings on the main street, the Sovetskaya street, built during the early 1950s

The largest employer in Bronnitsy, a jewellery factory, dates back to a cooperative established in November 1924. According to the factory's website, at that time all local craftsmen processed no more than 100 kilograms (220 lb) of gold per annum, compared to present-day four metric tons per annum. The cooperative was reformed into a factory in 1956; in 1963 it absorbed another former cooperative from nearby Sinkovo. The factory relocated into its current buildings, constructed since 1968, in 1972. According to its website, it employs around seven hundred people in Bronnitsy alone, or 10% of the town's workforce.

NII-21 (21st research institute of the Ministry of Defence) is Russian military's primary facility for testing wheeled vehicles. Establishment of NII-21 in the 1950s was followed with much-needed professional training facilities; Moscow Motorway Institute (MADI) operates a branch in Bronnitsy since 1959.

The town's revenue for 2010 is set at around fifteen million US dollars; around half of it is collected locally through taxes, the balance is remitted from regional and federal funds. In 2009 fraud in the city hall became a subject of criminal case; deputy mayor committed suicide in jail.

== Education and sports ==
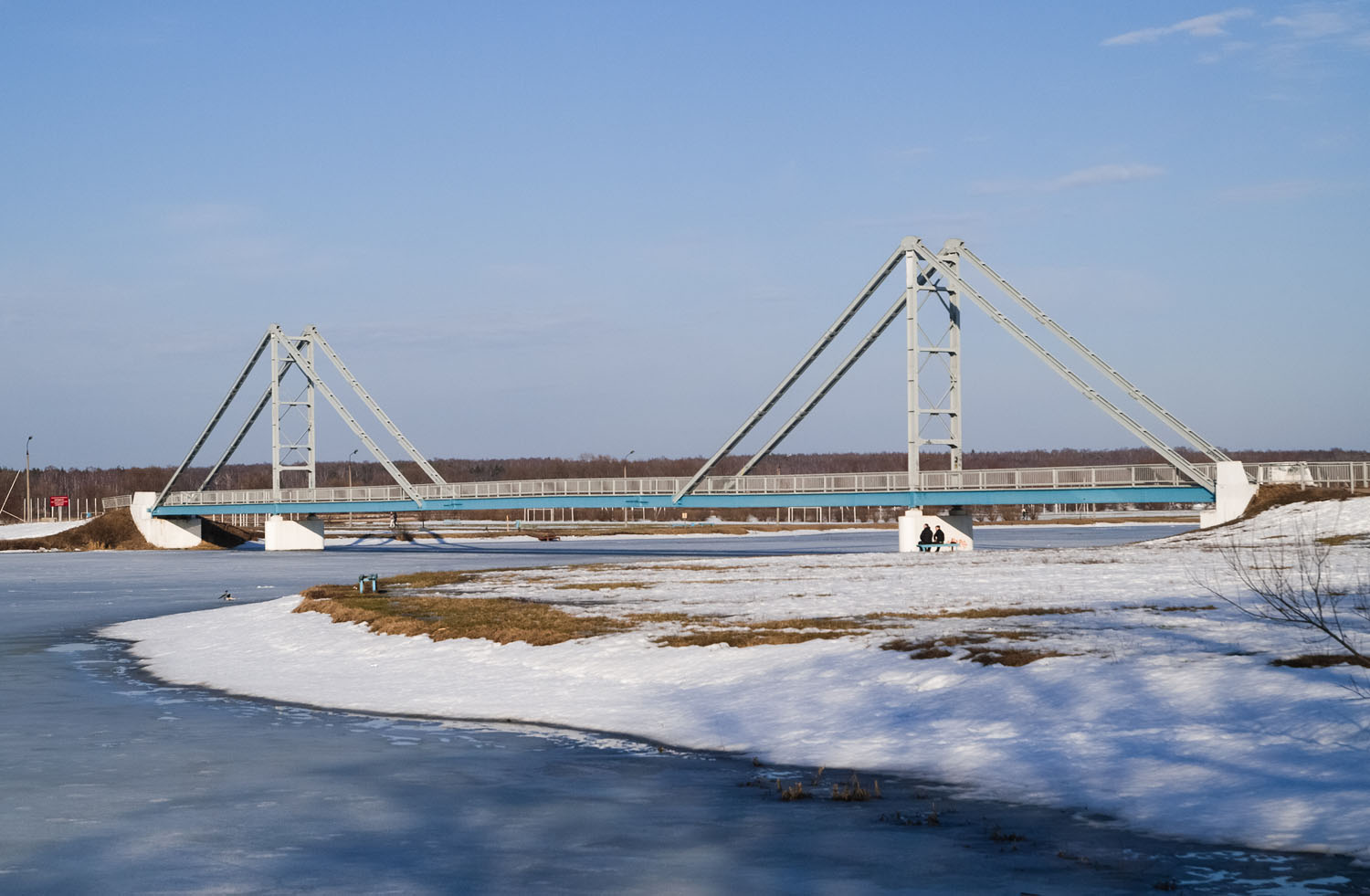
Foot bridge over Lake Belskoye

Bronnitsy has four high schools (one catering to the working youth) and a road workers' college. Two Moscow-based undergraduate-level schools, the Motorway Institute, and the Agricultural Engineering University, operate their branches here.

Bronnitsy and Lake Belskoye are home to two Olympic Reserve boarding schools (high school level and college level), specializing in rowing and canoeing and association football. Local football team, FC Fabus, has competed in Russia's Second League since 1995 with no significant results.

Since March 1996, Bronnitsy has hosted a competition in winter beach running (held on the next to last weekend of November and the second weekend of March).

Lake Belskoye and Moskva River regularly host sport fishing events. Attempts to acclimatize common carp and grass carp in Belskoe Lake failed (carp catch usually has no point value in fishing competitions). Silver carp (Hypophthalmichthys molitrix), released in 1993, survived and established a viable population despite very long sexual maturity period (12 to 13 years in Belskoe Lake). One silver carp, caught in 2006, reached 130 centimeters in length and weighed over 20 kilograms.

== Notable people ==
- Maksim Kaynov (born 2002), football player
- Mikhail Kuzyayev (born 1988), football player
