= Gurilyov =

Gurilyov is a Russian surname. Notable people with the surname include:

- Aleksander Gurilyov (1803–1858), Russian composer, pianist, and music teacher, son of Lev
- Lev Gurilyov (1770–1844), Russian musician and composer
