= Anatoly Dobrynin =

Soviet Russian diplomat and statesman (1919–2010)

- Анатолий Добрынин
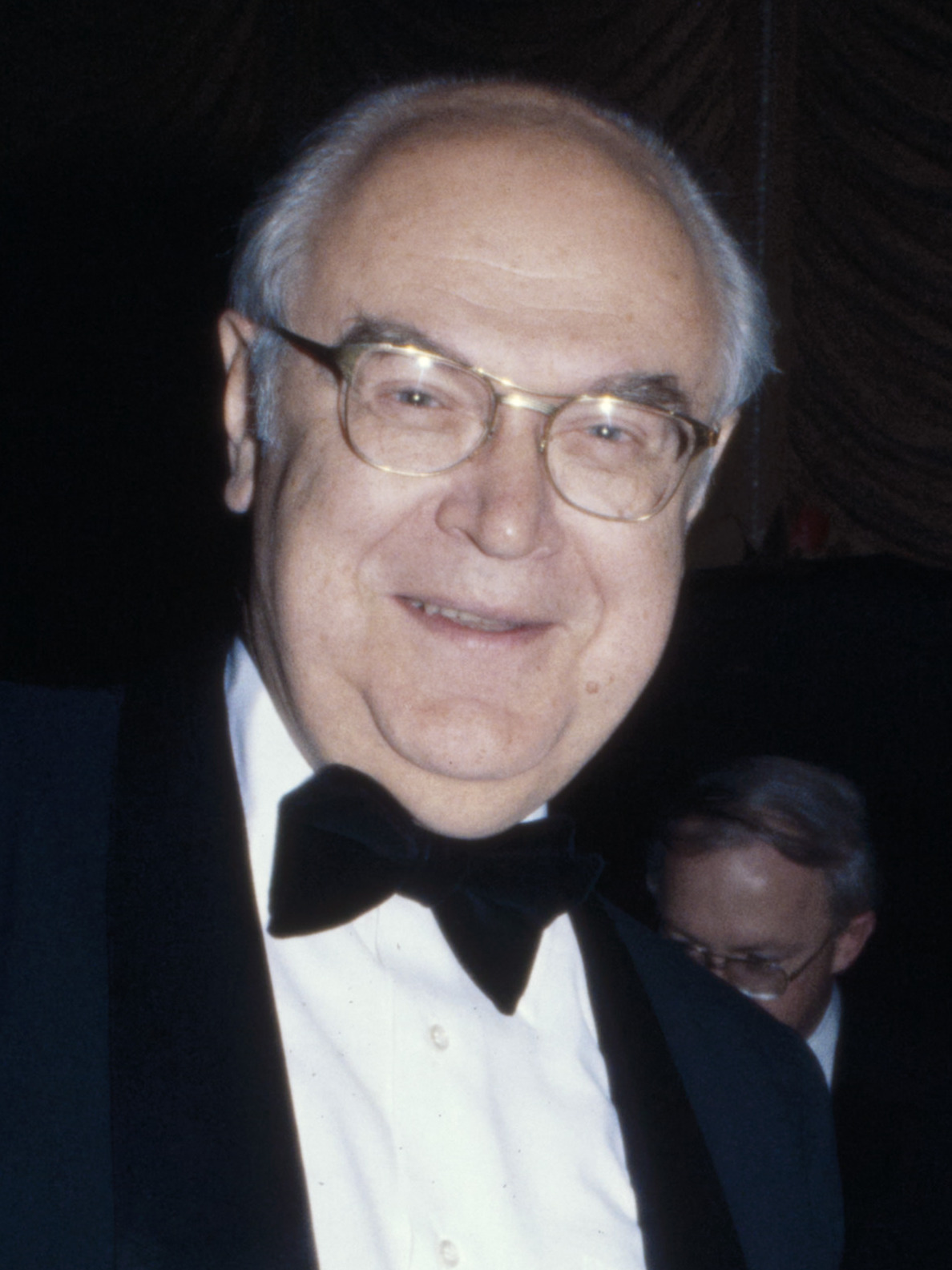
- Dobrynin in 1977

Head of the International Department of the Central Committee
- In office 6 March 1986 – 30 September 1988
- Preceded by: Boris Ponomarev
- Succeeded by: Valentin Falin

Ambassador of the Soviet Union to the United States
- In office 4 January 1962 – 19 May 1986
- Preceded by: Mikhail Menshikov
- Succeeded by: Yuri Dubinin

Member of the 27th Secretariat
- In office 6 March 1986 – 30 September 1988

Full member of the 24th, 25th, 26th, 27th Central Committee
- In office 9 April 1971 – 14 July 1990

Candidate member of the 23rd Central Committee
- In office 8 April 1966 – 9 April 1971

Personal details
- Born: Anatoly Fyodorovich Dobrynin; 16 November 1919 Krasnaya Gorka, Mozhaysky Uyezd, Moscow Governorate, Russian SFSR
- Died: 6 April 2010 (aged 90) Moscow, Russia
- Party: Communist Party of the Soviet Union (1946–1991)
- Spouse: Irina Dobrynina
- Education: Moscow Aviation Institute
- Profession: Diplomat, civil servant, politician

Anatoly Fyodorovich Dobrynin (Russian: Анато́лий Фёдорович Добры́нин, 16 November 1919 – 6 April 2010) was a Soviet statesman, diplomat, and politician. He was the Soviet ambassador to the United States for more than two decades, from 1962 to 1986.

He attracted notoriety among the American public during and after the Cuban Missile Crisis at the beginning of his ambassadorship, when he denied the presence of Soviet missiles in Cuba. However, he did not know until days later that Soviet premier Nikita Khrushchev had already sent the missiles and that the Americans already had photographs of them. Between 1968 and 1974, he was known as the Soviet end of the Kissinger–Dobrynin direct communication and negotiation link between the Nixon administration and the Soviet Politburo.

== Early life and education ==
Dobrynin was born in the village of Krasnaya Gorka, near Mozhaisk in the Moscow Oblast, on 16 November 1919. His father was a locksmith. He attended the Moscow Aviation Institute and after graduation went to work for the Yakovlev Design Bureau. He entered the Higher Diplomatic School in 1944 and graduated with distinction.

== Career ==
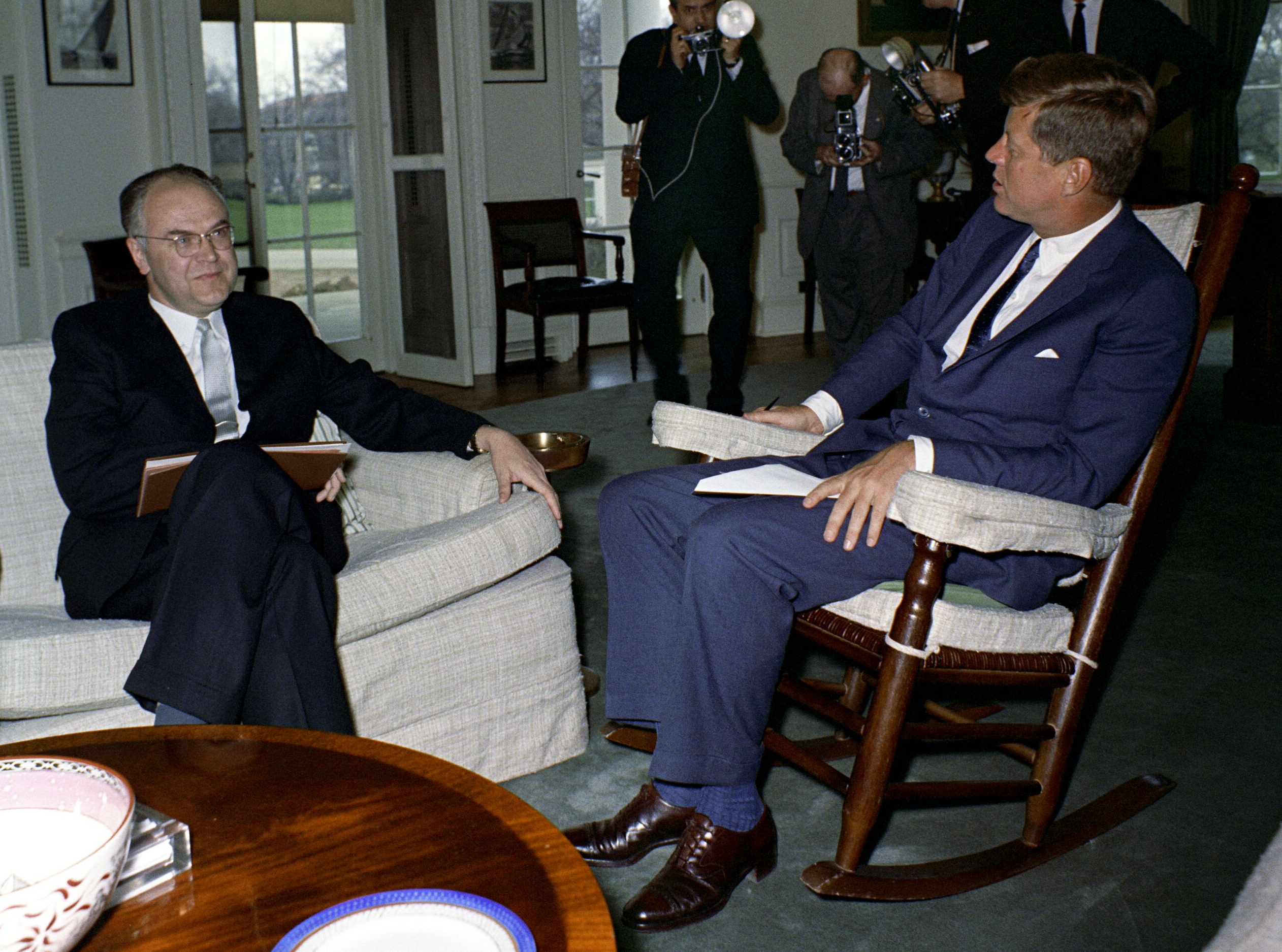
Dobrynin speaking with president Kennedy in The Oval Office on March 30, 1962

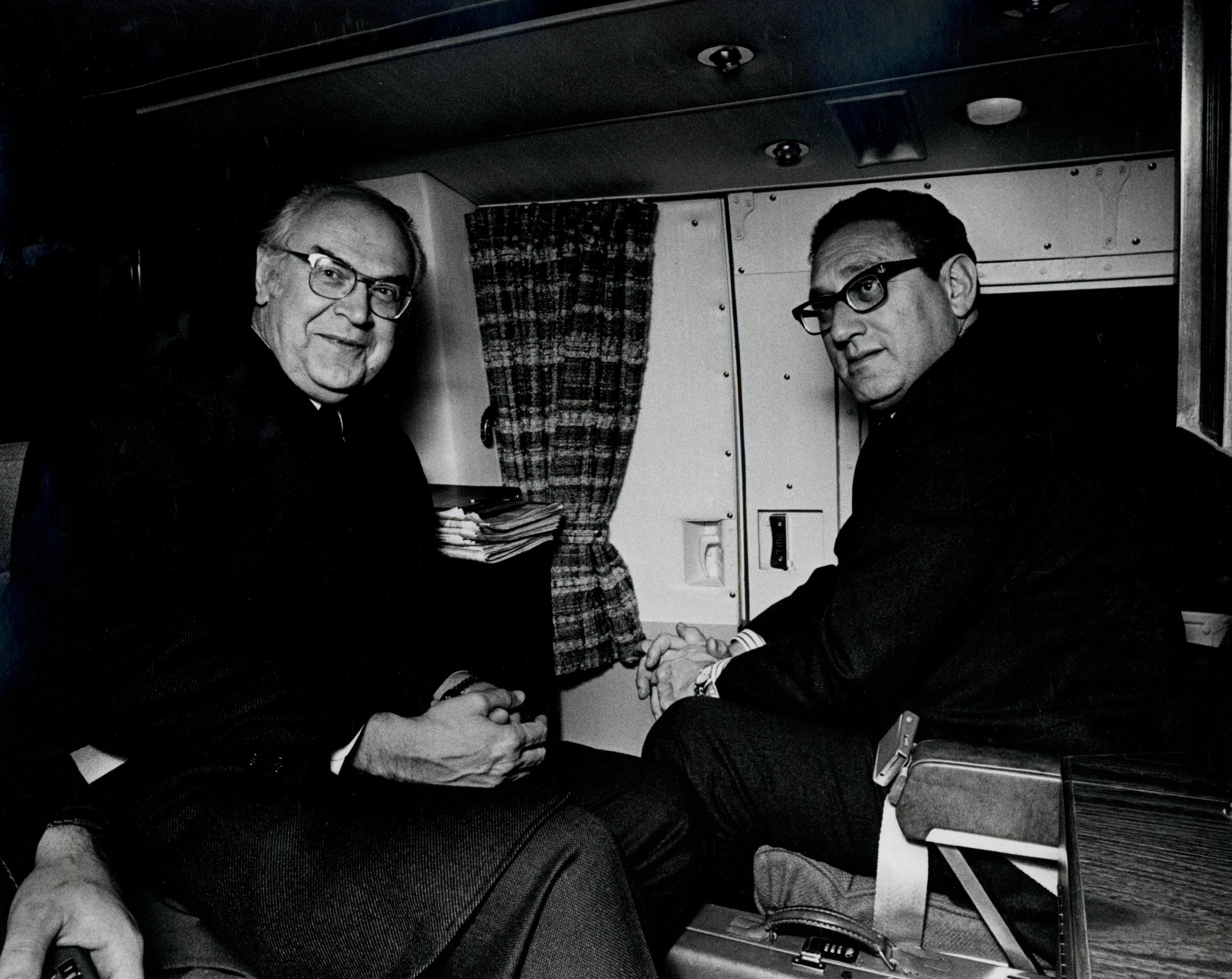
With Henry Kissinger on January 25, 1974

Dobrynin joined the diplomatic service of the Ministry of Foreign Affairs in 1946. He later joined the secretariat of the ministry and worked for Vyacheslav Molotov, Dmitri Shepilov, Andrei Gromyko, and Valerian Zorin. He was appointed deputy secretary general at the United Nations in 1957 and returned to Moscow as head of the foreign ministry's department of the United States and Canada in 1960. Dobrynin was appointed as Soviet ambassador to the United States in 1962, and he was the Dean of the Diplomatic Corps from July 1979. His tenure lasted until 1986.

Dobrynin had the unique experience of serving as Soviet ambassador to the United States during the terms of six presidents (Kennedy, Johnson, Nixon, Ford, Carter and Reagan). The Cold War rivalry made his position one of the key elements in Soviet–American relations, and between the Soviet ambassador to the United States (in Washington) and the United States Ambassador to the Soviet Union (in Moscow), most diplomatic business channeled through the former. Dobrynin's regular contacts with the US State Department resulted in him being granted his own parking spot in the State Department garage. When President Reagan revoked that privilege in 1981, he remarked about Dobrynin, "I couldn't help liking him as a human being."

Dobrynin developed an especially close relationship with Henry Kissinger with whom he often met and dined with up to four times a week. They had a direct line to each other's office; they exchanged gifts, shared inside jokes, and even met each other's parents. Following President Ford's defeat in the 1976 presidential election, Dobrynin called Kissinger to say, "I am going to miss you." Kissinger returned the sentiment: "I will miss you too. If it is possible to have a Marxist friend." It was the last transcribed telephone conversation between the two during Kissinger's White House tenure.

In 1971, he was elected to the Central Committee of the Communist Party of the Soviet Union (CPSU). After his long term as ambassador to the United States, he returned to Moscow in 1986 and joined the party's Secretariat and led the international department of the CPSU Central Committee for two years. At the end of 1988, he retired from the Central Committee and served as an advisor to the Soviet presidency.

He attended the December 1989 Malta Summit, which formally marked the end of the Cold War. He was given the honorary rank of Russian ambassador extraordinary and plenipotentiary in 1992.

== Works and death ==
His book, In Confidence: Moscow's Ambassador to Six Cold War Presidents, was published in 1995. (It was last reprinted in 2001 as ISBN 0-295-98081-8.)

Dobrynin died in Moscow on 6 April 2010. In a telegram to Dobrynin's family, Russian president Dmitry Medvedev paid tribute to Dobrynin, stating:

Anatoly Dobrynin, a talented and memorable figure, professional of the highest calibre and legend of Russian diplomacy has left us. His name is associated with a whole epoch in Russian and global foreign policy.

There can be no overestimating Anatoly Dobrynin's personal contribution to resolving the Cuban missile crisis and normalising Soviet-American relations.

His outstanding abilities as a negotiator and analyst earned him the respect of both colleagues and opponents, and his goodwill, deep knowledge and wealth of life experience won him the respect and liking of everyone around him.

== Honours and awards ==
- Hero of Socialist Labour
- Five Orders of Lenin
- Order of the Red Banner of Labour
- Order of Honour (18 August 2009) – for his great contribution to the foreign policy of the Russian Federation and many years of diplomatic service
- Honored Worker of the Diplomatic Service of the Russian Federation
- Honorary Doctor of the Diplomatic Academy of Russia

== See also ==
- The Kennedys (miniseries)
