= Semenkovich (disambiguation) =

Semenkovich may refer to:

- Semenkovich, minor planet named after Nicholas Paul Semenkovich, ISEF awardee in 2003
- Vladimir Semenkovich (1861–1932), Russian ethnologist and archaeologist
