= Kuzyayev =

Kuzyayev (Russian: Кузяев, Tatar: Хуҗаев) is a Russian masculine surname; its feminine counterpart is Kuzyayeva. It may refer to

- Adyam Kuzyayev (born 1965), Russian football player and coach
- Daler Kuzyayev (born 1993), Russian football player of Tatar descent
- Mikhail Kuzyayev (born 1988), Russian football player
