= Afanasy Fet =

Russian poet (1820–1892)

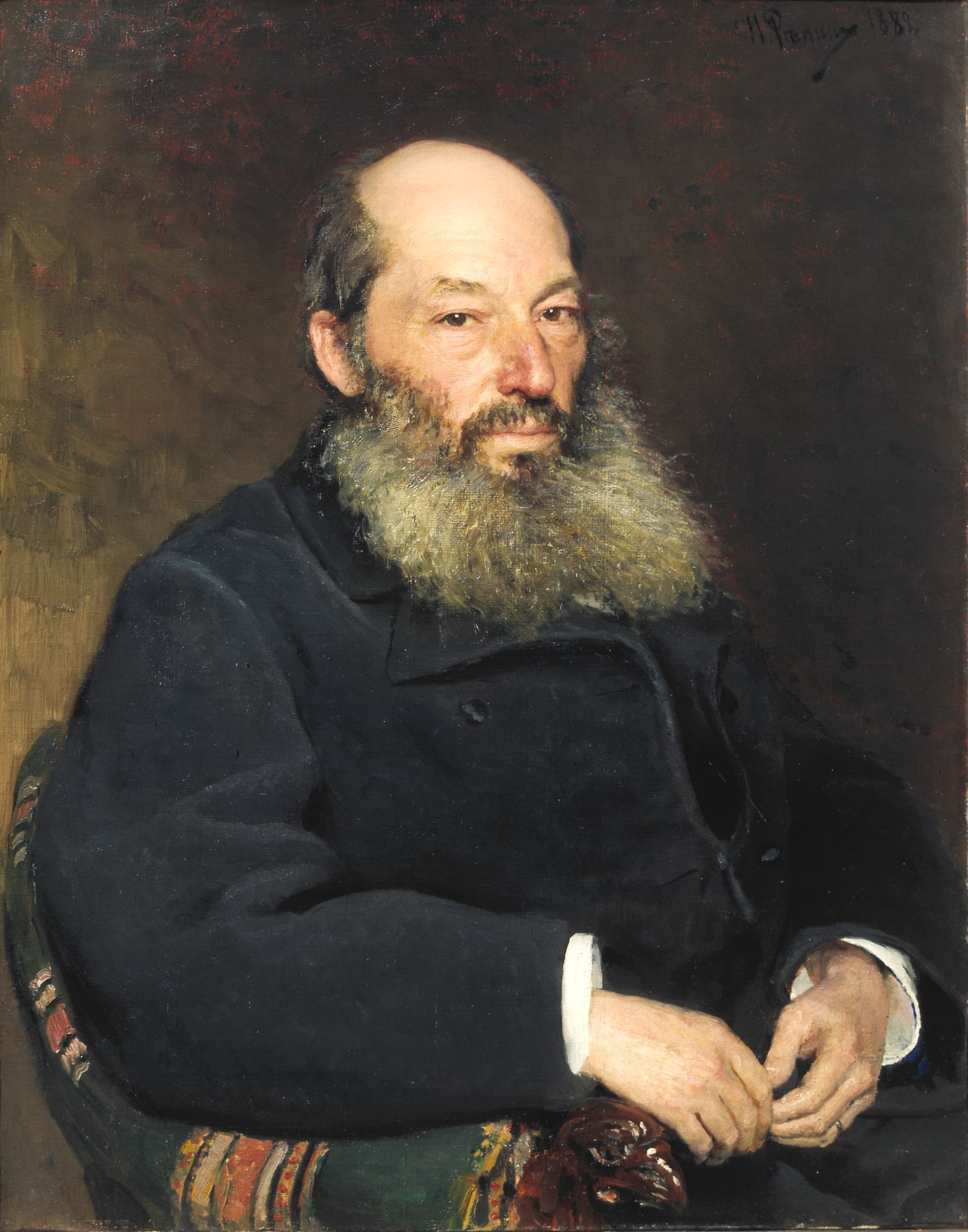
- Portrait by Ilya Repin, 1882
- Born: 5 December [O.S. 23 November] 1820; Mtsensk, Russian Empire
- Died: 3 December 1892 (aged 71); Moscow, Russian Empire
- Relatives: Vladimir Semenkovich

Afanasy Afanasyevich Fet (Russian: Афана́сий Афана́сьевич Фет, IPA: [ɐfɐˈnasʲɪj ɐfɐˈnasʲjɪvʲɪtɕ ˈfʲɛt]), later known as Shenshin (Russian: Шенши́н, IPA: [ʂɨnˈʂɨn]; 5 December [O.S. 23 November] 1820 – 3 December [O.S. 21 November] 1892), was a Russian poet regarded as the finest master of lyric verse in Russian literature.

== Biography ==
Afanasy Fet was born on 5 December 1820 to Afanasy Shenshin, a 44-year-old Russian landlord from Mtsensk, and Charlotte Becker, a 22-year-old daughter of Karl Becker, a German inn-keeper. While staying with them during his visit to Germany, Shenshin fell in love with Charlotte, who agreed to follow him to Russia. Pregnant with her second child, she divorced her husband Johann Foeth, a Darmstadt court official, and married her Russian suitor, but was forced to leave her one-year-old daughter Carolina behind. (Note: Later Carolina Foeth too came to Russia where she married Alexander Matveyev, the rector of Kiev University.) In November, at Shenshin's Novosyolky estate, she gave birth to a boy who was christened Afanasy Afansyevich Shenshin.

Fourteen years later, as Shenshin and Becker's marriage, registered in Germany, proved to be legally void in Russia, Afanasy had to change his surname from Shenshin to Foeth, that of his biological father. This proved to be an exceptionally traumatic experience for the boy, aggravated as it was by the fact that back in Darmstadt Johann Foeth refused to acknowledge him as his son. (Note: It was this humiliation, scholars later opined, that accounted for the idiosyncrasies of a man who spent most of his life contemplating suicide. This outcome, though, was not the worst of possible evils: as an illegitimate child he fell to the bottom of the Russian social hierarchy.) According to Tatyana Kuzminskaya (Sophia Tolstaya's sister), Fet's "greatest grievance in life was that he was not a legitimate Shenshin like his brothers (who treated him as an equal) but the out-of-wedlock son of Foeth, a German Jew. (Note: There are several marginal theories as to Fet's parents' origins. According to one of them, advocated by the Russian women's magazine Sudarushka, Charlotte Becker descended from an "ancient aristocratic family based in East Germany" while Johann Foeth was an illegitimate son of Louis I, Grand Duke of Hesse, which supposedly made Afanasy Fet a cousin of Maria Alexandrovna.) But he couldn't bring himself to admit that the name Fet was so much superior to that of Shenshin, and that he himself had made it so through his poetry, a fact which Leo Tolstoy tried in vain to convince him of."

=== Education and literary debut ===
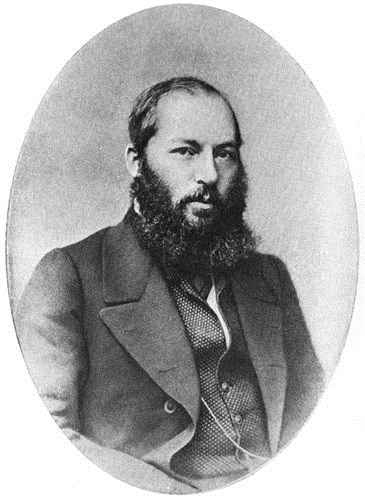
Afanasy Fet in 1860; photograph by Andrey Denyer

At age 14 Afanasy Shenshin was sent to a German boarding school in Võru. It was there that he was informed in a letter that from then on his name would be Fet, not Shenshin, which made him feel, admittedly, "like a dog that had lost its master." In 1837 Afanasy Shenshin moved his stepson to a Moscow boarding school owned by the historian Mikhail Pogodin. In autumn 1838 Fet enrolled at Moscow University to study law and philology. In his first year he started writing poetry, later citing Goethe, Heine, and Yazykov as influences, and met Apollon Grigoriev, a fellow student and aspiring poet. The two became close friends and soon Afanasy moved into Grigoriev's house in Zamoskvoretchye and settled in a small room on the upper floor, often visited by two other friends, Yakov Polonsky and Sergey Solovyov. Apollon Grigoriev's ideas concerning poetry writing influenced young Fet too.

In the late 1830s Fet showed some of his poems to Pogodin, who sent them to Nikolay Gogol for an opinion. The writer's verdict ("undoubtedly gifted") encouraged Fet to publish his first collection, Lyric Pantheon (1840, signed "A.F."). It was praised first by professor Pyotr Kudryavtsev in Otechestvennye Zapiski, then by Vissarion Belinsky, who several years later maintained: "of the living Russian poets Fet is the most gifted." In 1841 the poem "Poseidon" appeared in Otechestvennye Zapiski; it was the first one to be published under the author's full name. Later scholars wondered if it hadn't been a mere typesetter mistake that caused the Russian ё (as in Foeth) to be turned into e (as in Fet). Regardless of this, according to biographer Tarkhov, "the transformation was significant: in one moment the surname of 'a Hesse-Darmstadt citizen' turned into the pseudonym of a Russian poet."

In 1842–1843 Fet's poems were regularly printed in Otechestvennye Zapiski and Moskvityanin, the latter's editor Stepan Shevyryov becoming his mentor. Some of his poems appeared in the collection The Best of Russian Poetry compiled by Aleksey Galakhov in 1843. "Don't wake her up at dawn..." (На заре ты её не буди) was set to music by Alexander Varlamov and become a popular Russian romance. Yet, in those years Fet was a miserable man: "Never in my life have I known a person so tormented by depressions… The possibility of him committing suicide horrifies me greatly," wrote Apollon Grigoriev in his autobiographical novella Ophelia.

=== Military service and the Sovremennik years ===
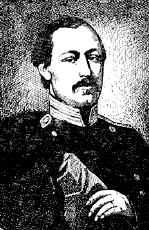
Afanasy Fet as a Russian army officer

In 1844 Fet graduated from the University. Later that year he lost his mother to cancer. In early 1845 he left the Novosyolky estate, went to Kherson, and in April, following the Shenshin family tradition, joined the Imperial Cuirassier regiment as a junior officer with the view of possibly retrieving his surname and all the privileges of nobility he'd lost with it. There was just one aspect of the army life that he enjoyed, discipline. Otherwise, he complained in letters of cultural isolation and feeling 'buried alive'. On one occasion he described his experience there as "life amongst monsters" when "once an hour another Viy approaches you, expecting you to smile back."

In autumn 1848 Fet fell in love with 20-year-old Maria Lazich, a well-educated and intelligent girl, who loved him too. Seeing no way of marrying the penniless daughter of a poor Kherson landowner, Fet abandoned her. In 1851 Maria died, having set her dress on fire. Some suggested this might have been an accident, others saw it as the final statement of "a proud and desperate girl who decided life was not worthwhile without the man she loved." Maria died from her burns four days later, her last words allegedly being: "Do not blame him for this." An immense feeling of remorse tormented Fet for the rest of his life. This incident and the image of Maria would frequently be evoked in his later verses.

In the late 1840s, after stopping for several years, Fet returned to writing. In 1850 a collection called Poems by A. Fet heralded his successful return to the Russian literary scene. In 1853 he was transferred to an uhlan regiment based in nearby Saint Petersburg. During the Crimean War he served with the troops guarding the Estonian coastline. In 1853 Nikolai Nekrasov invited Fet to join Sovremennik, where he re-joined his old friends Ivan Turgenev and Vasily Botkin. In Turgenev's house Fet met Leo Tolstoy, then a young officer fresh from the Crimean War, which resulted in lifelong friendship. Not only did Nekrasov actively promote Fet as a poet, he obviously preferred his work to that of others, his own included. "What the source of this miraculous poetic daring could be, the true characteristic of a great poet, coming from this good natured, plump officer, is beyond me," wondered Leo Tolstoy.

Poems by A.A. Fet came out in 1856 but proved to be little more than a re-worked and edited version of his 1850 book. According to writer and memoirist Avdotya Panaeva, Fet gave Nekrasov and Turgenev carte blanche in compiling this anthology and while the former was against extensive editing, the latter insisted on drastic cuts and, in the end, his argument won out. In the preface to the book, Nekrasov wrote: "Not a single poet since Pushkin has managed to give such delight to those who understand poetry and readily open their soul to it, as Fet does. This does not mean to say both are equal: it's just that in his own field Fet is as superb as Pushkin was in his, much more vast and diverse one."

By 1856, when the poetry collections by Fet and Nekrasov came out almost simultaneously, their personal relations had already become strained due to ideological differences. In his 1859 essay on Fyodor Tyutchev Fet wrote: "The notion that poetry's social mission, moral value, or relevance could be superior to its artistic aspects, is nightmarish to me; I abandoned this notion long ago." The rift with the rest of the Sovremennik staff became apparent, and later that year Fet left the journal, now dominated by Nikolay Chernyshevsky and Nikolay Dobrolyubov.

=== Retirement from the army ===
In 1857 in Paris Afanasy Fet married Maria Petrovna Botkina (the daughter of a rich tea-trader and sister of his good friend, literary critic Vasily Botkin), described as an exceptionally kind and sympathetic person, totally devoid of jealousy, who was perfectly happy to treat her husband "like a nanny treats a child". In 1858 Fet retired from army service and returned to Moscow. A year later he purchased the desolate Stepanovka khutor in the Mtsensk region of Oryol gubernia, and in 1860 moved there. In the course of the next fourteen years he turned a piece of bare (even if fertile) land into a flourishing garden, launched a horse-breeding farm, built a mill and embarked upon agricultural ventures which proved successful and lucrative. In 1862 Russky Vestnik started to publish his articles on agricultural commerce and economy. All this evoked sharp criticism from, among others, Mikhail Saltykov-Shchedrin. "One of those who have disappeared down into their earthly holes is now Fet who… in the moments of leisure produces by turns now a fine romance, next a misanthropic essay, then another romance, and more misanthropy," he wrote. For eleven years (1867–1877) Fet served as a local Justice of the peace and became much respected both by peasants and by fellow landowners.

Leo Tolstoy, who retired to his Yasnaya Polyana country estate at roughly the same time, approved of Fet's decision to "settle upon the land". Unlike Tolstoy, though, who departed to the country looking for better working conditions, Fet stopped writing altogether. "He turned into an agronomist, a 'landlord in desperation', let his beard grow, some improbable behind-the-ears curls as well is unwilling to hear of literature and only damns all periodicals enthusiastically," Turgenev informed Polonsky in a May 1861 letter. "Once I was a poor man, a regimental adjutant, now, thank God, I am an Oryol, Kursk and Voronezh landowner, and live in a beautiful manor with a park. All this I've achieved by hard labour, not by some machinations", wrote Fet in a letter to Reveliotti, his Army officer friend.

=== Later years ===
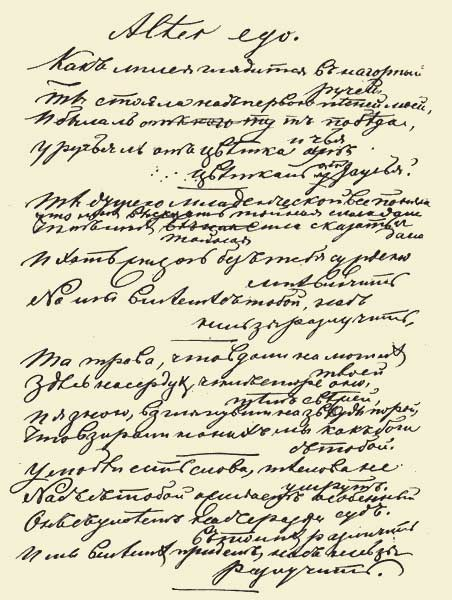
Alter Ego. 1875 poem autograph.

In 1860s Fet translated Aeneid and Arthur Schopenhauer's The World as Will and Representation. His translation of Shakespeare's Julius Caesar, published in 1859, though, was negatively reviewed by Sovremennik. "There is just no dramatist gift in me whatsoever," Fet conceded later. From the Village and Notes on Civilian Labour, two collections of essays which were originally published by Russky Vestnik, Literaturnaya biblioteka and Zarya magazines in 1862–1871, featured some finely written novellas and short stories too. In retrospect, the best example of Fet's prose is considered to be the short novel The Golts Family (1870) which told the tragic story of an alcoholic village doctor's social and mental decline. Those were the years of Fet's close contact with Leo Tolstoy whom he often visited at Yasnaya Polyana.

In 1873 Fet wrote to his wife: "You cannot even imagine how I hate the name Fet. I implore you never to mention it… If someone would ask me to give one single name to all the trials and tribulations of my life, I'd say without hesitation, this name is 'Fet'". That same year Fet's greatest ambition was finally achieved: Tsar Alexander II granted him the return of his stepfather's surname with all the rights and privileges of the Russian nobility. Turgenev greeted with sarcasm "the disappearance of Fet and the emergence of Shenshin." More sympathetic proved to be Leo Tolstoy who praised Fet's courage and patience in bringing this painful matter to an end. Now officially Shenshin, the poet retained Fet as his nom de plume.

In 1873 Fet bought a second village, Vorobyovka, nearby Kursk and returned to writing poetry. "At Vorobyovka my muse awoke from many years of sleep and started visiting me as often as she used to at the dawn of my life," Fet wrote to Grand Duke Konstantin Romanov on 25 August 1891. In 1881 Fet bought a small house at Plyuschikha Street in Moscow. From then on he would spend winters in the city, move to Vorobyovka in April and stay there till late September. The result of this new surge of creativity were four books of the Evening Lights series (released in 1883, 1885, 1888 and 1891) which featured some of his finest work.

Fighting off hostile reviewers, who were making much of the contrast between an affluent and somewhat pompous landowner and his sublime, elegant poetry, Fet insisted it was his pragmatism that helped him get the absolute artistic freedom. Still, the interest in his work started to diminish. Evening Lights sold poorly and only a circle of close friends (Leo Tolstoy, Vladimir Solovyov, Nikolay Strakhov, Yakov Polonsky, Aleksey K. Tolstoy, Pyotr Tchaikovsky among them) expressed delight with Fet's latter life poetry. "I await eagerly for [the 4th volume of] your Evening Lights… I wish I could add – 'like the rest of our intelligentsia does', but sadly that is not the case," Polonsky wrote in a November 1890 letter.

In 1890 two volumes of Fet's My Memories: 1848–1889 were published. Another book, My Early Years, came out posthumously, in 1893. On 28 January 1892 at the Moscow Hermitage restaurant the grandiose event celebrating the 50th anniversary of Fet's literary career was held. He seemed pleased with the lavishness of it, but later in the poem On My Muse's 50th Birthday referred to the celebration as a 'requiem'. On 26 February Fet was granted the title of kamerger by a monarch's decree. His last poem is dated 23 October 1892.

=== Death ===
The circumstances of Fet's death caused almost as much controversy as those of his birth. In October 1892, Fet moved from Vorobyovka to his Moscow house. While visiting Countess Sophia Tolstaya he caught cold and later contracted severe bronchitis. The family doctor Ostroumov, speaking to Fet's wife, fearing that the poet was moribund, suggested that he take Communion. "Afanasy Afanasyevich recognizes none of such rituals," she replied and assured the doctor she was ready to take the sin of depriving a dying man of his communion upon herself.

Early in the morning on 21 November Fet suddenly sent for champagne. His wife protested, but he seemed to be in great agitation and haste. "Go and return as quickly as you can," he ordered. As Maria left, Fet told his secretary (referred to later as Mrs. F.): "Come with me, I will dictate to you". – "A letter?" she enquired. "No", came the reply. His secretary followed him and wrote the following: "I see no reason for consciously prolonging my suffering. I willingly chose to do what would be inevitable anyway." He signed this: "21 November. Fet (Shenshin)", with a "firm hand, certainly not that of a dying man," according to the biographer Boris Sadovskoy.

What followed was described as "a kind of mental storm some people experience when facing death. Only a bout of temporary madness could account for his starting running about, fetching dinner and paper knives which obviously could do him no serious harm," Sadovskoy wrote. As Fet grabbed a paper knife from the table before him, his secretary managed to disarm him, injuring her hand.

Chased by his bleeding secretary, Fet entered a dining-room, approached the cabinet where table-knives were kept and unsuccessfully tried to open it. Then, panting, he suddenly fell on a chair. According to the secretary, his eyes opened wide, as if facing some terrible sight, his hand rose as if to make a cross, then fell down lifeless. The cause of his death was later believed to be a heart attack. The funeral service was held on 22 November 1892 at the Moscow University church. Afanasy Fet was interred on 23 November in his family vault in Kleymyonovo, the old Shenshin family estate.

== Legacy ==
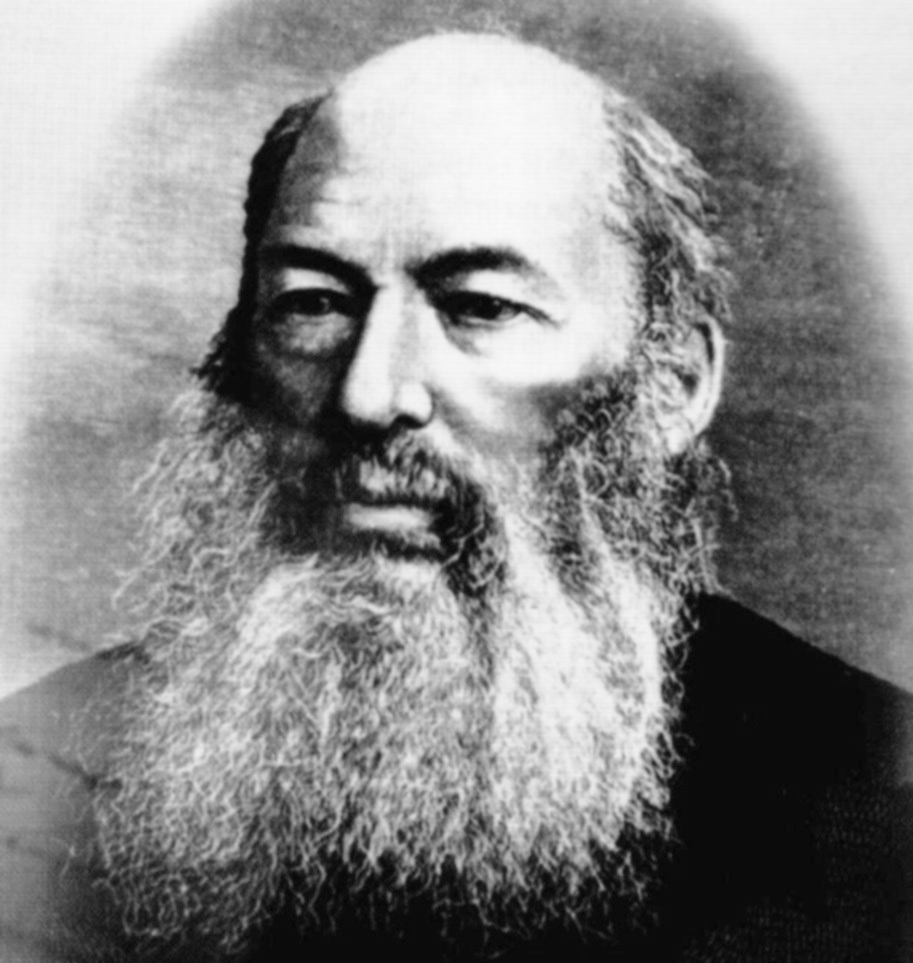
Fet in his later years

In retrospect, Afanasy Fet is regarded as the greatest lyric poet of Russia. His verses were highly esteemed by Vissarion Belinsky, who ranked him on par with Mikhail Lermontov. "Such lyrical insight into the very core of the Spring and human emotion risen by it was hitherto unknown in Russian poetry," wrote critic Vasily Botkin in 1843. Fet, whose sensual and melancholic lyric was often imbued with sadness and tragedy, exerted powerful influence upon Russian Symbolists, notably Innokenty Annensky and Alexander Blok, the latter referring to him as his "great teacher." Among those influenced by Fet were Sergey Yesenin and Boris Pasternak. Tchaikovsky wrote:

Fet is an exceptional phenomenon. There is no use to compare him to other first class poets, or go and analyze Pushkin, Lermontov, Al. Tolstoy and Tyutchev looking for similarities... For, in his finest moments, Fet leaves the boundaries of poetry altogether and boldly ventures into our field. That is why, when I think of Fet, often Beethoven comes to mind... Like Beethoven, he is endowed with the power to touch upon those strings of our souls which are out of reach for poets, no matter how strong, who rely on words only. Rather than a poet, he is a musician-poet.

Professor Pyotr Kudryavtsev also considered Fet a great master of melody-driven verse. His poetry, 'unique in terms of aesthetics,' can be taken as proof that "real poetry is self-sufficient and its sources won't dry out even in the most unfavorable times," Kudryavtsev argued.

Yet, Fet was not a popular poet during his lifetime. Vasily Botkin remarked that even in the 1860s when his books enjoyed mostly positive reviews, "the general public treated these praises skeptically… If he was successful at all, then mostly with the literary men." One reason for this might have been his unwillingness to change according to the 'spirit of the times'. "Unlike Nekrasov, who expressed zeitgeist perfectly, always going with the flow, Fet refused to 're-tune his lyre's strings'," the Soviet scholar Dmitry Blagoy argued.

=== Fet's aesthetics and philosophy ===
Fet was the proponent of the romantic idea of the need for a poet to make a distinction between the two life spheres, the 'ideal' and the 'real' one. "Only the ideal sphere gives one an opportunity to take a whiff of a higher life," he asserted in his memoirs. This sphere, according to Fet, encompassed beauty, love, moments of harmony between the human soul and the infinite cosmos, and Art as such. Longing for the Ideal, according to biographer Tarkhov, was the driving force of Fet's poetry. In his essay on Tytchev, published by Russkoye Slovo in 1859, Fet maintained that it was only 'pure love' (the concept introduced to the Russian literature by Vasily Zhukovsky) that 'pure art' was supposed to serve. While in the 1840s such ideas were still attractive, in the 1860s Fet found himself a lone figure among the predominantly realist writers.

Fet considered natural philosophy to be a mechanism for examining ties, seen and unseen, between man and nature. Along the lines of his quest for 'wholeness', he united poems into cycles ("Spring", "Summer", "Autumn", "Snow", "Melodies", "Fortune-telling"), each representing some aspect of the soul, all united by the leitmotif of merging with what lies outside the boundaries of human perception. Only the 'life outside' gives man moments of absolute freedom, Fet argued. The way to these outer realms lies in communicating with Nature, which has a soul of its own, through moments of joy ('one-ness'). Female beauty served as part of the whole picture for Fet who had the cycle of poems dedicated to women (A.Brzhevskaya, Sophia Tolstaya, A.Osufieva, and others) based on his 'philosophy of beauty'. The process of regaining unity with nature leads man out of the corrupt real world and brings him ecstatic joy and total happiness, according to Fet.

== Political views ==
Vladimir Semenkovich, the author of several books on Fet, argued that he was "...neither a liberal nor a conservative, just a man of the 1840s, or, should I rather say, one of the last men of the 1840s. One thing in which he might have differed from [the people of his generation] was that he was more of a practical man... Being courageous enough to have his own opinions, he spoke against the predominant social theory… and for that has been subjected to ostracism in the times when going against the grain was unthinkable." "My father thought [Fet's] greatest asset was the ability to think independently: he always had his own ideas, never borrowed them from other people," remembered Ilya Lvovich Tolstoy.

Fet's 'cult of domesticity' held 'civil labour' as another high ideal. For him, a 'natural' attitude to work was analogous to love, serving as a link with Nature and having the potential to bringing back harmony to the society that had lost it. Built into Fet's 'philosophy of labour' was the romantic notion of freedom. He advocated the free development of human character and warned against exceedingly regulating social life. "An artful tutor should learn to restrain himself from removing what looks to him as ugly features of his subject. Cut off a young fur-tree's crooked branches and you'll kill it… Wait for forty years and you'll see a straight and strong trunk with a green crown," Fet wrote in 1871.

== Personality ==
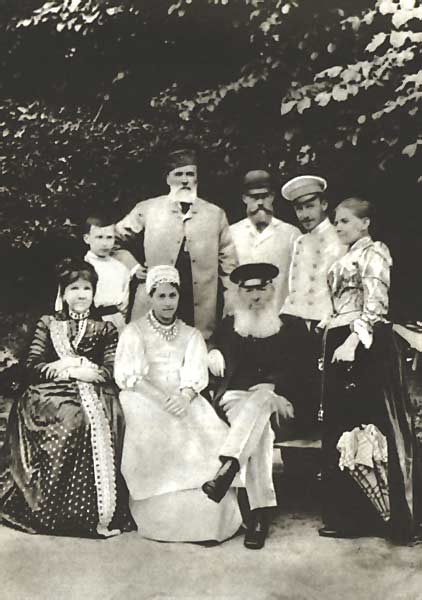
Yakov Polonsky (standing, second from the left) and members of his family guesting at Vorobyovka in 1890. Sitting, left to right: Maria Botkina, Natalya (Polonsky's daughter) and Afanasy Fet

Yakov Polonsky often marveled at the duality of his friend's character and the way he managed to create the artistic world that would look like a perfect antidote to his own down-to-earth persona. In one of his last letters he wrote: "What kind of creature you are, I just can't make you out. Where do these unctuously clear, idealistically sublime, youthful verses come from? Could Schopenhauer or any other philosopher be behind the origins of these lyric moods of yours, the psychic processes behind it? ... I'm tempted to suspect there is some other being, unseen to us, mere mortals, lurking down there, amidst glowing light, with eyes azure, and wings behind! ... You've grown old, while he stays young. You deny everything while he is a believer. You despise life while he, down on his knees, bursts into tears readily when witnessing any of its true manifestations!"

According to Vladimir Semenkovich common people admired Fet. "A 'proper kind of barin,' was how peasants called him. And this was being said of a 'barin' who never hesitated to tell boldly the truth, to peasants too, not just men of his own class," he wrote. Peasants greatly respected Fet for, among other things, his ability to make peace between feuding parties of his rural community, all the while expressing himself in the most straightforward way. "Fet was one of the few people [in Russia] who could be described as 'classic' Europeans, in the best sense of this word; with his vast education and delicate manners he was reminiscent of the French marquises of better times," Semenkovich opined.

Never an open person, over the years Fet became even more secretive and self-centered. "Never, as far as I can remember, has he expressed any interest in any other person's inner world," wrote Tatyana Kuzminskaya, Leo Tolstoy's sister-in-law, to whom Fet dedicated one of his most beautiful poems ("The night was shining, trees were full of moonlight…"). According to Sergei Tolstoy, Fet, whom Pyotr Ilyich Tchaikovsky considered 'more a musician than a poet,' comparing him to Beethoven, was "indifferent to music and has been heard referring to it as 'nothing but unpleasant noise'".

Dismissed as unpleasant and dour by Tolstoy's children, Fet was adored by the master of Yasnaya Polyana himself. "…The reason why we admire each other is that we two are the kind of men who are capable of thinking with, to use your own expression, 'heart's mind' as opposed to 'brain's mind'," Tolstoy wrote in a 28 June 1867 letter. "Intellectually you are superior to everybody else who's around me. You're the only one who can give [my mind] this 'different kind of bread' for it to be satiated with," he confessed on another occasion. "You are one of the very few people I came to know in my lifetime who, while retaining totally rational attitude to life, have always stood on its edge, staring into nirvana. [People like you] see life clearer for peering into timelessness, for it is this way they greatly strengthen their [earthly] vision," wrote Tolstoy in an April 1876 letter.

== Sample ==
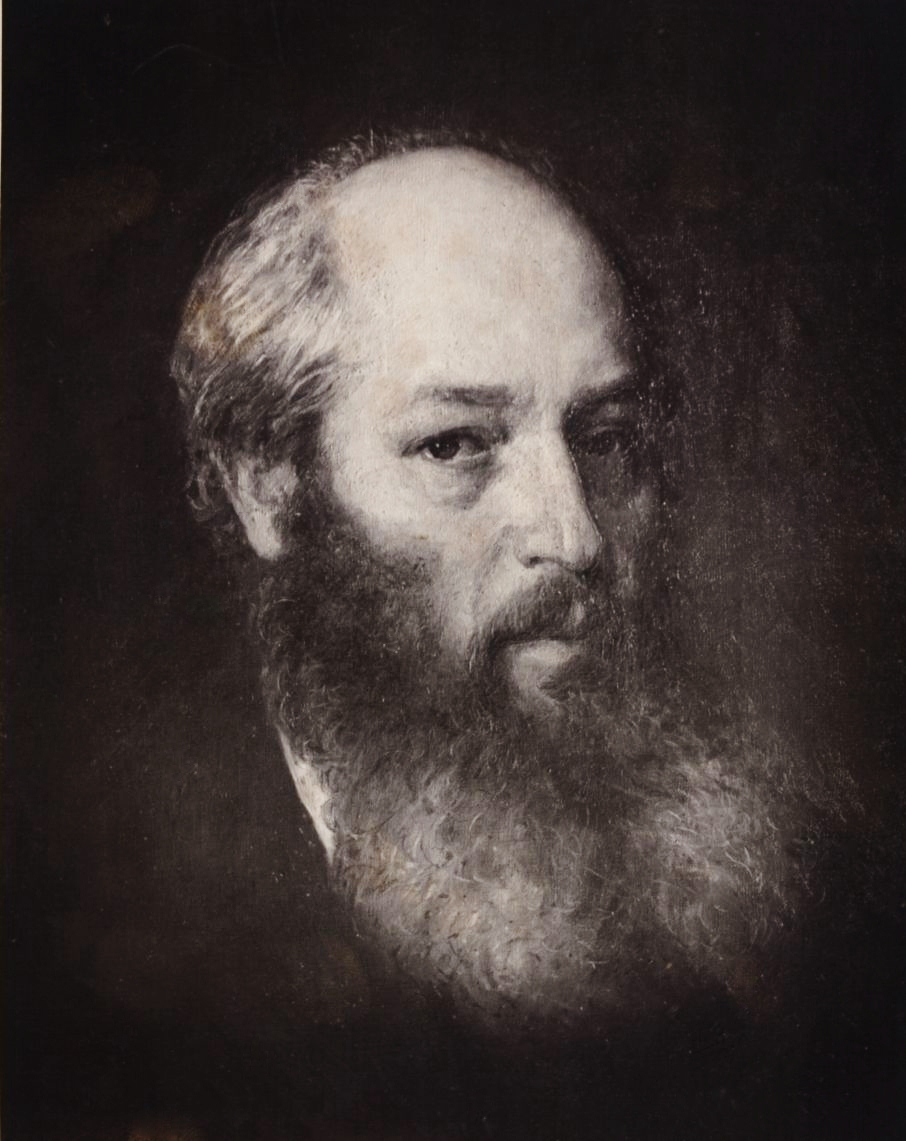
Afanasy Fet

External videos
- I have come to you, delighted... on YouTube by actor Vladimir Samoylov.

I Have Come to You, Delighted («Я пришёл к тебе с приветом…»)

Я пришёл к тебе с приветом,
Рассказать, что солнце встало,
Что оно горячим светом
По листам затрепетало;

Рассказать, что лес проснулся,
Весь проснулся, веткой каждой,
Каждой птицей встрепенулся
И весенней полон жаждой;

Рассказать, что с той же страстью,
Как вчера, пришёл я снова,
Что душа всё так же счастью
И тебе служить готова;

Рассказать, что отовсюду
На меня весельем веет,
Что не знаю сам, что́ буду
Петь — но только песня зреет.

I have come to you, delighted,
To tell you that sun has risen,
That its light has warmly started
To fulfil on leaves its dancing;

To tell you that wood's awaken
In its every branch and leafage,
And with every bird is shaken,
Thirsty of the springy image;

To tell you that I’ve come now,
As before, with former passion,
That my soul again is bound
To serve you and your elation;

That the charming breath of gladness
Came to me from all-all places,
I don't know what I'll sing, else,
But my song's coming to readiness.
