= Vladimir Semenkovich =

Russian archeologist (1861–1932)

Professor Vladimir Semenkovich
- Владимир Семенкович
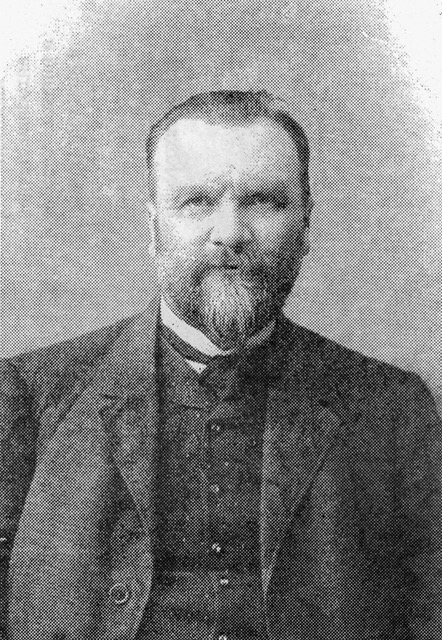
- Born: 1861
- Died: 1932 (aged 70–71); Moscow
- Resting place: Donskoye Cemetery
- Education: Moscow Archeological Institute, Plekhanov Russian University of Economics
- Alma mater: Moscow Archeological Institute
- Known for: Gelonians and Mordvins
- Spouse: Yevgenia Mikhailovna Semenkovich
- Children: Varvara, Sergei, Vsevolod, Yekaterina, Vera, Natalia, and Alexander
- Parents: Nikolay Semenkovich (father); Nadezhda Krivtsova (mother)
- Relatives: Afanasii Foet
- Scientific career
- Fields: Ethnology, Archeology, Historical Geography
- Workplaces: Moscow Archeological Institute, Toulouse International Academy
- Thesis: Gelonians and Mordvins. Materials and Research On The Historical Geography Of The Upper Reaches Of The Don and the Oka. Part II (1911)

Vladimir Nikolayevich Semenkovich (Note: Russian: Владимир Николаевич Семенкович) (1861 – 1932) was a Russian ethnologist and archaeologist, best known for his work in historical geography of Upper Don and Oka Gelonians and Mordvins where he had identified some of the Herodotus's tribes with contemporary ethnic groups of the Russian Empire and described the difference between physical, and geographical conditions of European Russia in the fifth century BC and the modern period.

== Biography ==
Vladimir Semenkovich graduated from Kronstadt Higher Naval Technical School in 1883 and was assigned to the battleship Chesma as Engineer Officer (Lieutenant of Imperial Russian Navy) where he served until 1891. He had resigned in 1891 and bought estate Vaskino in Serpukhovsky Uyezd, Moscow Governorate in 1894. Anton Chekhov bought estate Melikhovo almost the same time and they became neighbours for more than 10 years. Vladimir Semenkovich devoted himself to ethnology, archeology, and ethnography but first he had become known as publicist after he wrote number of articles in newspaper Moskovskiye Vedomosti (Moscow News)", journals Russky Arkhiv (Russian Archive), Russkoye Bogatstvo (Russian Wealth), and his "North of Russia In Naval and Commercial Relations" in "Russkoye obozreniye (Russian review)" journal in 1894. Following the death of the poet Afanasii Foet in 1892, Semenkovich, whose grandmother was the sister of Foet's father, became the executor of the poet's literary estate. Semenkovich's contemporaries recalled his energy and volatile temper. Anton Chekhov would jokingly call him his “savage neighbor.”

== Ethnology work ==
Vladimir Semenkovich became Professor and correspondent of Moscow Archeological Institute (merged with Moscow State University in 1920s) on 15 May 1909. On 5 November 1909, he was enlisted as honorable member of the institute. In September 1910 he was enlisted as active member of the institute, and awarded with Golden medal. Semenkovich issued the book of notes by Pierre Martin La Martinière "Travel in the Nordic countries" dated 1637-ca.1676 in 1912 and became Toulouse International Academy Professor and correspondent in the same year. He became the head of the Historical Geography Department in 1914.

=== Gelonians and Mordvins ===
In 1913, Vladimir Semenkovich's monograph Gelonians and Mordvins was issued.

== Charity ==
Semenkovich had been the director of Alexandria Orphan Trade School For Boys and was granted the rank of Active State Councillor on 1 January 1912 for his merit in Moscow Orphanage Council activity.

== Family ==
Vladimir Semenkovich married Yevgenia Telyatnikova in 1887. Yevgenia just graduated from Sankt-Peterburg Conservatory. She was the daughter of Sevastopol first guild merchant Mikhail Telyatnikov. The couple lived in Moscow, they attended concerts, operas, and paid visits to Foets where they took part in musical evenings. Leo Tolstoy and Eugene Botkin were among the numerous guests and enjoyed Yevgenia playing piano. Vladimir and Yevgenia Semenkovich had 7 children: Varvara, Sergei, Vsevolod, Yekaterina, Vera, Natalia, and Alexander. They divorced in 1904. The youngest son, Alexander Semenkovich became an ethnographer. He finished Crimean Frunze Tavrichesky State University in 1922, his thesis was "Art of Crimean Tatars" (now in Sevastopol Ethnological Museum). He died of tuberculosis aged 25.

== Bibliography ==
- North of Russia In Naval and Commercial Relations. Russian Review Journal. Moscow, 1894
- Vladimir Semenkovich. Preface to Pierre Martin de la Martinière's "Travel in the Nordic countries". Moscow, 1911 (lost)
- Pierre Martin de la Martinière, Stefan Kuznetsov, Vladimir Semenkovich. Travel in the Nordic countries, which describes the customs, lifestyle and superstition of Norwegians, Lapps, Kilopys, Borandayetses, Siberians, Samoyeds, Novozemeltsis, and Icelanders, with many pictures (1637-ca.1676). Moscow Archeological Institute, 1912
- Gelonians and Mordvins. Materials and research on the historical geography of the upper reaches of the Don and the Oka. Part II, Moscow, 1911 (lost)
- Gelonians and Mordvins. Materials and research on the historical geography of the upper reaches of the Don and the Oka. Part I. A.I. Snegiryova's Publishing, Moscow, 1913

== See also ==
- Bilsk hillfort, Ukraine. A suggested site of Gelonus eighth-third c BC
- Gelonians
- Mordvins

== Sources ==
- Mikhailov, A.A. "Marine Strongholds. Domestic Publicistics In the Second Part of 19th c. About Navy Base In the North of Russia: Konkevich A.E., Semenkovich V.N." (PDF) (in Russian). Saint-Petersburg.
- Natalia Gorbacheva [granddaughter]. Po stranitsam semeinykh arkhivov [Family Archives' Pages]. Moscow, 2001 (in Russian)

=== External links ===
- Vladimir Semenkovich's works in Boris Yeltsin Presidential Library
- Russian Bloodline Foundation
- Semenkovich family archive
- Afanasii Foet's letter
- Anton Chekhov's letter to Vladimir Semenkovich, 13 October 1896
