= Aleksander Gurilyov =

Russian composer

Aleksander L. Gurilyov
- Александр Л. Гурильёв
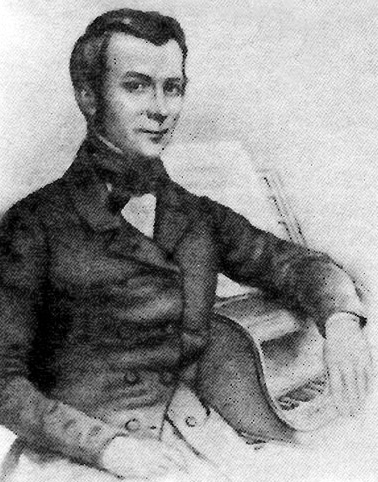
- Born: 3 September [O.S. 22 August] 1803; Semyonovsky, Serpukhovsky Uyezd, Moscow Governorate, Russian Empire
- Died: 11 September [O.S. 30 August] 1858
- Citizenship: Moscow, Russian Empire
- Occupations: Composer; pianist; teacher
- Years active: 1820s–1830s

Aleksander Lvovich Gurilyov (Russian: Александр Львович Гурилёв; 3 September [O.S. 22 August] 1803 – 11 September [O.S. 30 August] 1858) was a Russian composer, pianist, violinist, and music teacher who largely enriched the traditional romantic Russian repertoire through his solid technical accomplishments. He composed well over 200 pieces imbued with romantic, sentimental moods and subtle lyricism which enjoyed great success in Russia. He wrote numerous morceaux (short pieces) in a proto-dramatic, lyric declamatory style, all pre-dating the aesthetics of Dargomyzhsky, Mussorgsky and Tchaikovsky.

== Family ==
Aleksander was born in Semyonovskoye, Serpukhov Oblast into the family of serf musicians in the court of Count V.G. Orlov. His father, Lev Gurilyov, was the first to teach him music, beginning with rudimentary introductions.

== Training ==
Aleksander was raised as a member of the court of Count Vladimir Orlov's country estate Otrada, near Moscow. He was taught violin by his father, Lev Gurilyov, a serf musician and kapellmeister in the orchestra of the Orlovs. Together with his children, he took lessons in piano playing from Russian-based pianist of Irish origin John Field and later studied music theory under the guidance of Iosif I. Genishta. Within the serf orchestra, Aleksander played the violin and viola, and routinely played within the quartet of Prince Golitsyn.

== Career ==
In 1831, he was freed from serfdom after the death of his father's owner and subsequently moved to Moscow, where he soon became known as a composer of folk music, pianist, and teacher.

Having become acquainted with the representatives of the Moscow intelligentsia, namely the artists and writers, Gurilyov began to write songs based on poems by Grekov, Aleksey Koltsov, Makarova, and rapidly acquired rapid popularity. Some of his compositions were published by well-known publishers in music magazines such as the Russian publisher Bernard. He is accredited with writing over 60 individual songs among other incidental works. Some of his most popular songs are noted to be on the rather morose, melancholic, and somber side such as, “The bell is ringing in the same sound”, “Justification”, “Both boring and sad”, “Winter evening”, “You cannot understand my sadness”, and“Parting.” His romance "After the Battle," with words written by the Ukrainian-Greek poet Nikolay Shcherbina, was popular among naval populations since the Crimean War, The song, in contemporaneity, has been reformed into its current form, "The sea spreads wide," and has many variations and instrumental arrangements.

He was also prolific in piano compositions, many of them pianistic expansions on his own songs, along with other smaller forms such as variations, fantasies, salon songs, and even opera.

His friendship with the composer Alexander Egorovich Varlamov was of great importance to him.

Despite the rapid and sustained success of his published songs and compositions, Gurilyov spent most of his adult life in poverty, earning his keep as a private music teacher and editor. In his last years, he became paralyzed and suffered from mental illness, which eventually became the cause of his death, eventually passing in Moscow in 1858.

== Style ==
Aleksander was mostly known during his lifetime for his vocal works. His romances are imbued with romantically decadence, sentimental atmospheres and ethos, along with subtle lyricism tinged with proto-Rachmaninoffian nostalgic tendencies. His aesthetic choices are strongly influenced by the Russian folk-song tradition. Due to his affinity for clear melodies, and cantilena continuity, Gurilyov could be considered closer to Glinka's vein of first-hand, folk deference than Tchaikovsky's more idealistic approach. On the other hand, a number of romances were written in more structural, less archetypically decadent, systematically melodramatic style, anticipatory of the full-breasted works of Dargomyzhsky, Mussorgsky, and Tchaikovsky.

An important component of Gurilyov's vocal compositions is a carefully developed, and schematically organized piano accompaniment.

== Musical works ==
Most of his songs were written within the 1820s and 1830s. He wrote over 200 pieces, of which 50 are either folk pieces or were written using similar effects. Many of his songs have been sung by the Don Cossack Choir and other renowned, Russian vocal groups.

- Mother, My Dear
- The Gray-Winged Swallow Hovers
- The Bell Is Ringing Monotonously
- Little Sarafan (words by Aleksandr Polezhayev)
- La Fontaine
- Song Of The Coachman
- The Lovely Bird Has Flown
- The Swallow Circles
- Avert Your Eyes, Don't Look!
- I Told You When We Parted
- The Maiden's Sorrow
- Monotonously Rings the Little Bell
- You Can Not Understand My Grief
- A Toy Heart (words by Eduard Ivanovich Guber)
- The Prayer (words by Mikhail Lermontov)
- You Do Not Sing, Nightingale (words by Aleksey Koltsov)
- A Girl's Sadness (words by Aleksey Koltsov)
- Separation (At the Dawn of Hazy Youth)
- Variations on Do Not Awaken Her at Dawn of Alexander Varlamov
- Do Not Torture Me, My Darling from the opera Ivan Susanin of Mikhail Ivanovich Glinka
