= Ruzsky Uyezd =

Ruzsky Uyezd (Рузский уезд) was one of the subdivisions of the Moscow Governorate of the Russian Empire. It was situated in the western part of the governorate. Its administrative centre was Ruza.

== Demographics ==
At the time of the Russian Empire Census of 1897, Ruzsky Uyezd had a population of 55,522. Of these, 99.6% spoke Russian, 0.2% Polish, 0.1% Lithuanian and 0.1% German as their native language.
