= Dmitrovsky Uyezd (Moscow Governorate) =

Former Russian Empire subdivision

Dmitrovsky Uyezd (Russian: Дмитровский уезд) was one of the subdivisions of the Moscow Governorate of the Russian Empire. It was situated in the northeastern part of the governorate. Its administrative centre was Dmitrov.

== Demographics ==
At the time of the Russian Empire Census of 1897, Dmitrovsky Uyezd had a population of 119,686. Of these, 99.6% spoke Russian, 0.1% German and 0.1% Ukrainian as their native language.
