= Zvenigorodsky Uyezd (Moscow Governorate) =

Subdivision of Moscow Governorate, Russian Empire

Zvenigorodsky Uyezd (Звенигородский уезд) was one of the subdivisions of the Moscow Governorate of the Russian Empire. It was situated in the central part of the governorate. Its administrative centre was Zvenigorod.

== Demographics ==
At the time of the Russian Empire Census of 1897, Zvenigorodsky Uyezd had a population of 84,375. Of these, 98.9% spoke Russian, 0.3% Ukrainian, 0.2% Polish, 0.2% Lithuanian, 0.1% Yiddish, 0.1% German, 0.1% Belarusian, 0.1% Latvian and 0.1% Tatar as their native language.
