= Vereysky Uyezd =

Vereysky Uyezd (Верейский уезд) was one of the subdivisions of the Moscow Governorate of the Russian Empire. It was situated in the western part of the governorate. Its administrative centre was Vereya.

== Demographics ==
At the time of the Russian Empire Census of 1897, Vereysky Uyezd had a population of 54,074. Of these, 99.6% spoke Russian, 0.1% Polish, 0.1% Tatar and 0.1% German as their native language.
