= Lev Gurilyov =

Russian musician, composer

Lev Stepanovich Gurilyov (Russian: Лев Степанович Гурылёв; 1770–1844) was a Russian serf musician and liturgical music composer, along with pedagogue and composer, who was active in Moscow during the late 18th to early 19th centuries.

The father of pianist and composer Aleksander Gurilyov, Gurilyov was a violin player and kapellmeister in the orchestra of Count Vladimir Grigorievich Orlov, the younger brother of Catherine the Great, to which was owned according to the principles of serfdom. The majority of his life was spent on the Semenovskoye-Otrada estate, owned by the Orlov family, although several moves occurred. Due to the inherited musical aptitude in his son Aleksander, Count Orlov had the son sent to study under the guidance of Irish composer John Field for music composition, and Joseph Iosifovich Genishta for music theory.

He was most notably the contemporary of other late-baroque and early-classical, serf composers in Russia like Dmitry Bortniansky, Stepan Degtyarev, and Daniil Kashin.

== Education ==
He was a pupil of Giuseppe Sarti, although this cannot be confirmed.

== Career ==
For almost the entirety of his career, Gurilyov composed and played for the Orlov family in the chapel on their estate. Among his duties were teaching musicians, running rehearsals, leading the divine liturgy for the family, composing secular and sacred compositions, and various other kinds of rehearsal and practices. It is speculated that Gurilyov operated within the "Church of St. Nicholas the Wonderworker," located on the property of the estate. So competent and proficient was Gurilyov at his duties that performances had become well-attended, with popularity of work reaching other royal families and being notable for its praised combination of serf musicians from other regions.

== Works ==
Emancipated after the death of his owner in 1831, Lev Gurilyov composed many piano pieces and variations on Russian folk themes.

=== Piano ===
- 1794: Sonata in D minor
- 1808: Russian song "Ah! Why are you, my dear, sitting sadly?" with variations in C minor
- 1810: 24 preludes and one fugue for piano – the first cycle of preludes in all keys in the history of Russian music after J. S. Bach's 1722 analogous version.
- Piano Sonata No. 1 (published in 1954)
- E Minor Polonaise
- G Minor Polonaise
- Russian song "The people blame me" with variations
- Russian song "I'm losing what I love" with variations
- Russian song with variations (published in 1954)
- Russian dance
- Polonaise with choir in honor of Emperor Alexander I on the occasion of the conquest of all of Finland "All of Europe trembled, the horror of the kingdom destroyed everything"

=== Cantatas ===
- Let us glorify this longed-for day (1794)
- Song to the dear father, sung by dear children in Otrada (1785)

=== Mass ===
- Mass for 4 voices

=== Hymns and Chants ===
- Lord, who dwells
- How long, O Lord, will you forget me
- In the same way he desires
- Rejoice, O righteous ones, in the Lord
- Hear, O God, my voice, listen
- With my voice I cried to the Lord
- On the divine guard
- An angel is crying
- May my prayer be corrected
- It is worthy to eat
- Our Father
- Cherubic Hymn No. 1
- Cherubic Hymn No. 2
- The Grace of the World
