= Boris Sadovskoy =

Boris Alexandrovich Sadovskoy
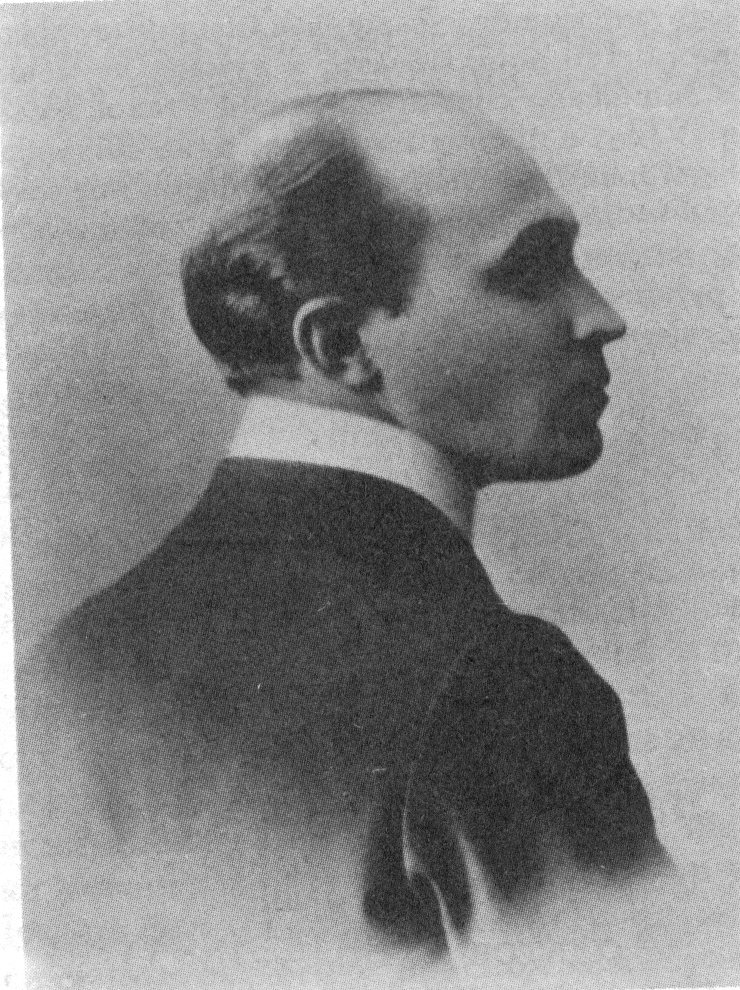
- Born: February 22, 1881; Ardatov, Nizhny Novgorod, Russian Empire
- Died: April 3, 1952 (aged 71); Moscow, USSR
- Education: Moscow University
- Writing career
- Period: 1901-1928
- Genres: Poetry, fiction, literary criticism

Boris Alexandrovich Sadovskoy (born Sadovskiy; Борис Александрович Садовской, February 22, 1881, Ardatov, Nizhny Novgorod Governorate, Russian Empire, - April 3, 1952, Moscow, USSR) was a Russian poet, prosaic, literary critic of the Silver Age of Russian poetry. Despite starting as a member of the Russian Symbolist movement and actively contributing to Vesy, Sadovskoy in his own poetry followed the tradition of Afanasy Fet, whom he admired and wrote several books about. His second adopted trend was the patriarchal Russia' stylisations which often took a form of literary parodies and mystifications. After the 1917 Revolution, Sadovsky, a monarchist, refused to emigrate and, becoming a wheelchair-user, lived in isolation, his last book published in 1928.
