= Bronnikovo =

Bronnikovo Бронниково
- Village
- Location within Vologda Oblast Location within Russia
- Coordinates: 59°23′N 38°38′E
- Country: Russia
- Region: Vologda Oblast
- District: Sheksninsky District
- Time zone: UTC+3:00

Bronnikovo (Russian: Бронниково) is a rural locality (a village) in Sizemskoye Rural Settlement, Sheksninsky District, Vologda Oblast, Russia. The population was 4 as of 2002.

== Geography ==
Bronnikovo is located 58 km north of Sheksna (the district's administrative centre) by road. Gorka is the nearest rural locality.
