= Mozhaysky Uyezd =

Subdivision in the Russian Empire

Mozhaysky Uyezd (Можайский уезд) was one of the subdivisions of the Moscow Governorate of the Russian Empire. It was situated in the western part of the governorate. Its administrative centre was Mozhaysk.

== Demographics ==
At the time of the Russian Empire Census of 1897, Mozhaysky Uyezd had a population of 53,967. Of these, 99.6% spoke Russian, 0.1% Polish, 0.1% Belarusian and 0.1% German as their native language.
