= Mikhail Kuzyayev =

Russian footballer

Personal information
- Full name: Mikhail Igorevich Kuzyayev
- Date of birth: 22 January 1988 (age 38)
- Place of birth: Bronnitsy, Russian SFSR
- Height: 1.80 m (5 ft 11 in)
- Position: Defender

Youth career
- GUOR Bronnitsy
- FC Spartak-2 Moscow

Senior career*
Years	Team	Apps	(Gls)
2005–2009	FC Saturn Moscow Oblast	0	(0)
2010–2011	FC Saturn-2 Moscow Oblast	53	(1)
2012	FC Sheksna Cherepovets	9	(0)
2012–2013	FC Lada Tolyatti	25	(0)
2013–2015	FC Kolomna	33	(0)
2016–2019	FC Kolomna	58	(3)
2019	SSh Shatura		
- * Club domestic league appearances and goals

Mikhail Igorevich Kuzyayev (Russian: Михаил Игоревич Кузяев; born 22 January 1988) is a Russian former professional football player.

== Club career ==
He made his professional debut for FC Saturn Ramenskoye in the return leg of their 2008 UEFA Intertoto Cup matchup against FC Etzella Ettelbruck.
