= Joseph Iosifovich Genishta =

Russian composer, conductor, pianist

Joseph Genishta Иосиф Геништа
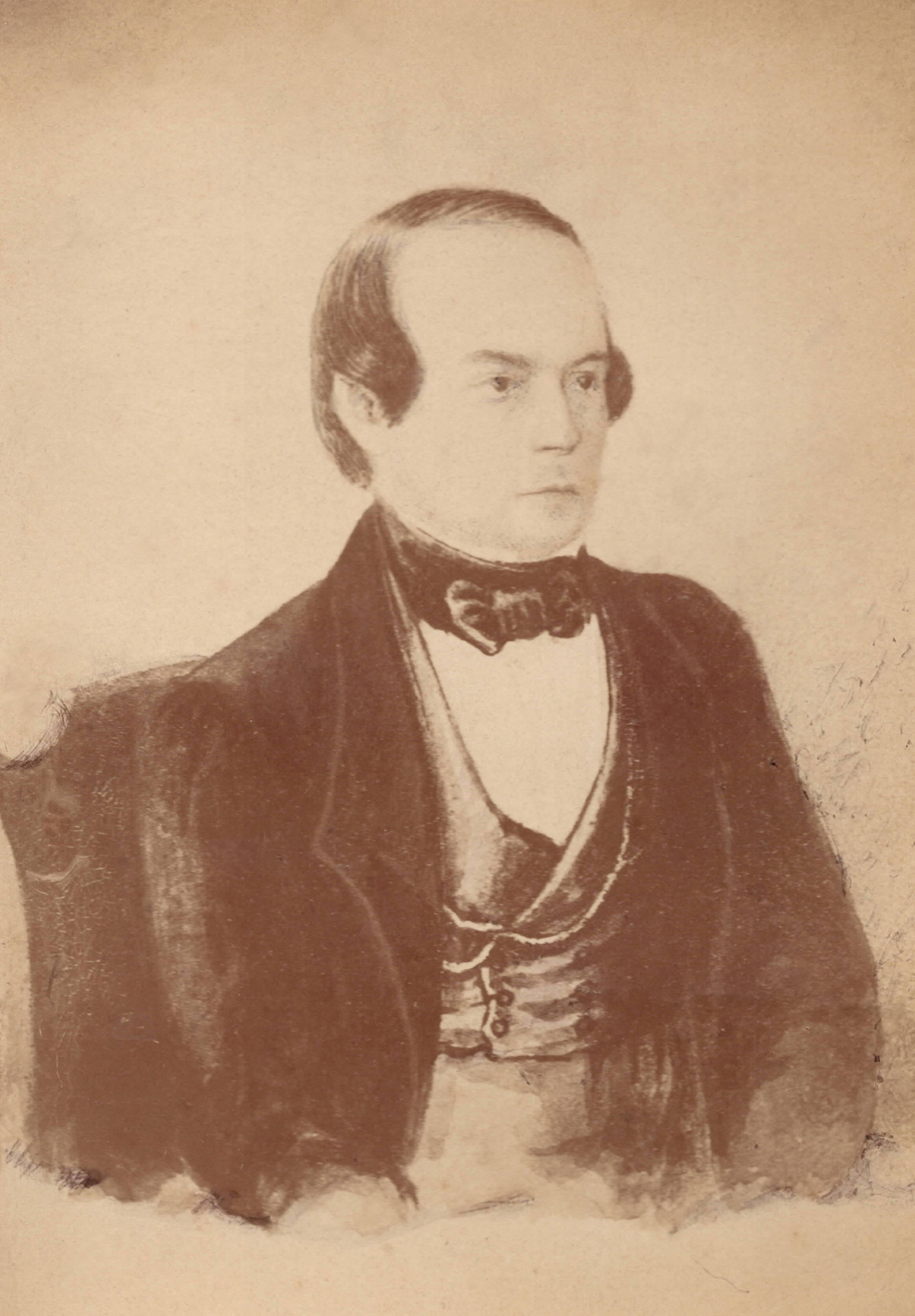

Background information
- Born: 13 [O.S. 24 November] 1795; Moscow, Russia
- Died: 25 July [O.S. 6 August] 1853
- Occupations: Composer; pianist; conductor

Joseph Iosifovich Genishta (or Osip Osipovich Enishta, Russian: Иосиф Иосифович Геништа; 13 November 1795 – 25 July 1853) was a Russian composer, conductor, and pianist who grew in popularity during the early-19th century prior to the popularization of composers like Mikhail Glinka. He was a promoter of the works of Ludwig van Beethoven and was fondly appreciated for his compositional skill by Robert Schumann.

== Education ==
It is said that Genisha first received his general education from the "Noble Boarding School" as part of the Moscow University in the early 1800s. However, this is incorrect due to a conflation of Joseph with his brother, Karl Genisha. Beginning in the 1810s, he began studying piano and composition with Johann Wilhelm Gessler and it is speculated, in the account of pianist Anton Kensky, that he also studied with John Field.

== Career ==
In 1812, Genishta had his first notable piano performance while additionally having his Piano Quintet No.1 premiered for the first time. At the same time, he began his pedagogical career, taking on the position as music teacher within the Trubetskoy family, soon after becoming the music teacher of Sofia Vladimirovna Venevitinova. As a teacher, he gained further prominence for his pedagogical methods, taking the etude form and developing it for concert, akin to others like Carl Czerny, Franz Liszt, and Frédéric Chopin.

By the start of the 1820s, Genishta had successfully begun making a prominent name for himself in Russian musical circles, being praised for his pianistic skills and increasing compositional competency.
