= Pyotr Kudryavtsev =

Russian writer and historian

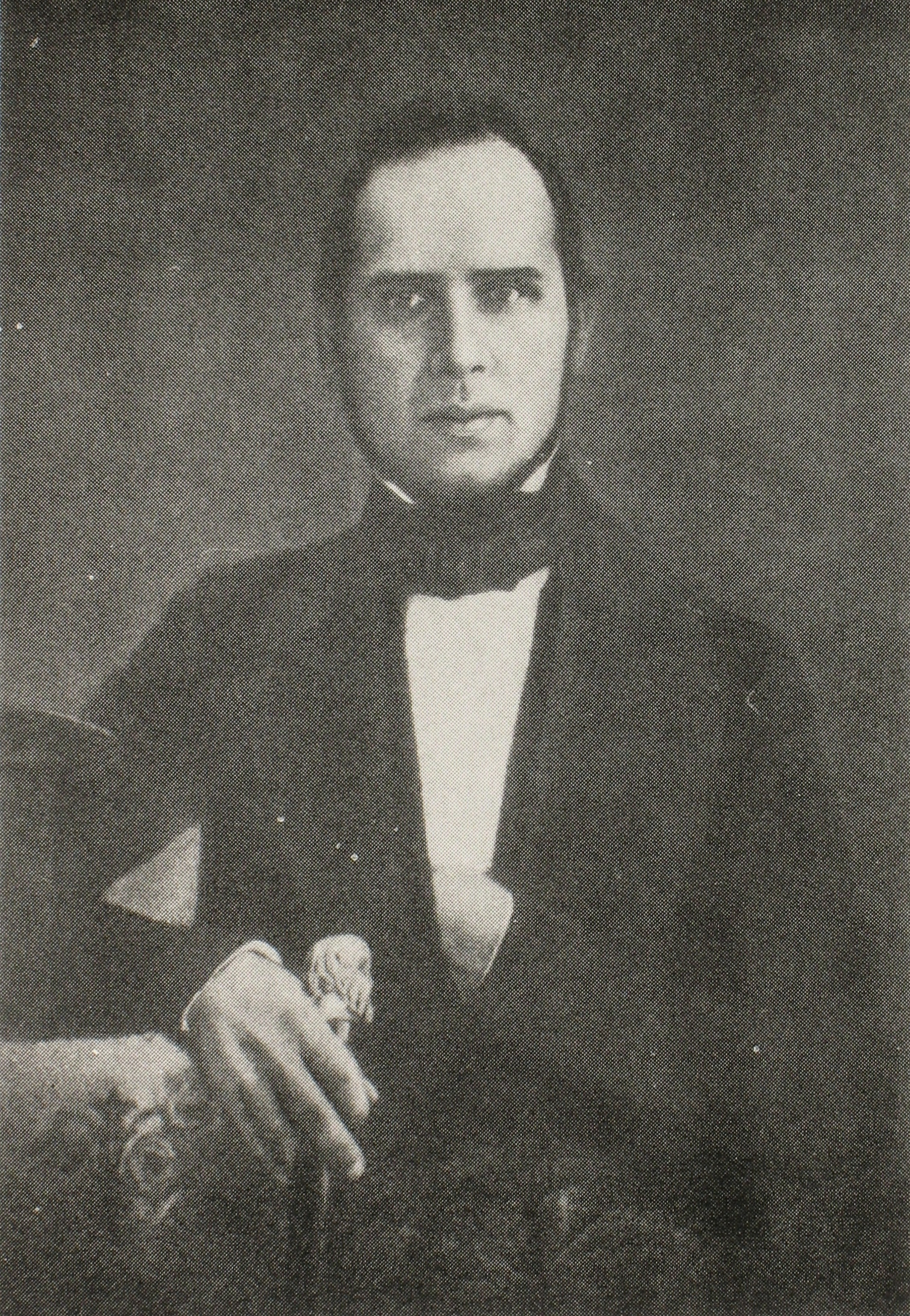
- Pyotr Kudryavtsev in the 1850s
- Born: 16 August 1816; Moscow, Russian Empire
- Died: 29 January 1858 (aged 41); Moscow, Russian Empire
- Education: Imperial Moscow University (1840)

Pyotr Nikolayevich Kudryavtsev (Russian: Пётр Николаевич Кудрявцев, 16 August 1816 – 29 January 1858) was a Russian writer, historian, pedagogue (professor of world history at Moscow University in 1851-1858), literary critic, philologist and journalist who in 1856-1858 was the head of Russky Vestnik's political review section.

Kudryvtsev started out in the late 1830s as fiction writer, whose short novels Katenka Pylayeva, Antonina, Dve strasti (Two Passions), Fleita (Flute), won him praises from Vissarion Belinsky. In 1841 he started to write literary and art reviews for Otechestvennye Zapiski and Sovremennik. More novellas followed, including the melancholy-driven Tsvetok (Flower), Nedoumenye (Bewilderment), Zhivaya kartina (Live Picture), Posledniy vizit (Final Visit), Oshibka (Mistake), Sboyev, Bez rassveta (Without Sunrise), again lauded for their insight and psychological depth.

In 1850 his magnum opus History of Italy from the Fall of the Roman Empire to Charlemagne Revival (Судьбы Италии от падения Западной Римской империи до восстановления её Карлом Великим) was published, and from then on, until his sudden death of galloping consumption in 1858, Kudtrayvtsev focused mainly on historical essays, treatises and critical reviews. He was considered heir to Timofey Granovsky's legacy and the major authority on the history of Ancient Rome and modern Italy in Russia of his time.
