= Bronnitsky Uyezd =

Bronnitsky Uyezd (Бронницкий уезд) was one of the subdivisions of the Moscow Governorate of the Russian Empire. It was situated in the southeastern part of the governorate. Its administrative centre was Bronnitsy.

== Demographics ==
At the time of the Russian Empire Census of 1897, Bronnitsky Uyezd had a population of 130,304. Of these, 99.8% spoke Russian and 0.1% Polish as their native language.
