= Moskovsky Uyezd =

Subdivision of Moscow Governorate, Russian Empire

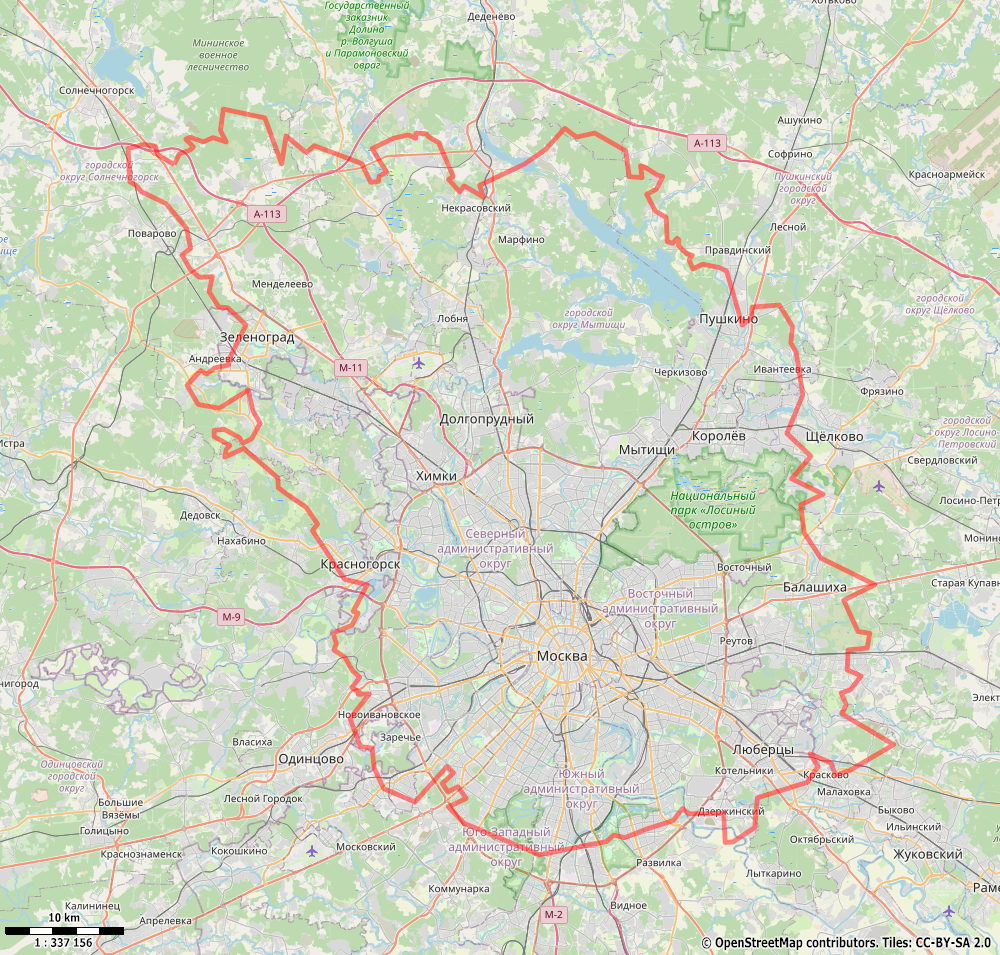
Simplified boundary extracted from 1849 map overlaid on 2021 map

Moskovsky Uyezd (Московский уезд) was one of the subdivisions of the Moscow Governorate of the Russian Empire. It was situated in the central part of the governorate and existed until 1929. Its administrative centre was Moscow.

== Demographics ==
At the time of the Russian Empire Census of 1897, Moskovsky Uyezd had a population of 1,203,926. Of these, 95.6% spoke Russian, 1.5% German, 0.8% Polish, 0.4% Yiddish, 0.4% Tatar, 0.4% Ukrainian, 0.2% French, 0.1% Armenian, 0.1% Belarusian, 0.1% English, 0.1% Latvian and 0.1% Czech as their native language.
