= Serpukhovsky Uyezd =

Serpukhovsky Uyezd (Russian: Серпуховский уезд) was one of the subdivisions of the Moscow Governorate of the Russian Empire. It was situated in the southern part of the governorate. Its administrative centre was Serpukhov.

== Demographics ==
At the time of the Russian Empire Census of 1897, Serpukhovsky Uyezd had a population of 112,002. Of these, 99.0% spoke Russian, 0.4% Ukrainian, 0.2% Polish, 0.1% Yiddish, 0.1% German and 0.1% English as their native language.
