= Moscow Governorate =

1708–1929 unit of Russia

Coordinates: 55.7517°N 37.6178°E

Moscow Governorate Московская губерния
- Governorate
- Coat of arms

- Location in the Russian Empire
- Country: Russian Empire
- Established: 1708
- Abolished: 1929
- Capital: Moscow

Area
  - Total: 33,272.84 km^{2} (12,846.72 sq mi)

Population (1897)
  - Total: 2,430,581
  - Density: 73.05000/km^{2} (189.1986/sq mi)
  - Urban: 46.67%
  - Rural: 53.33%

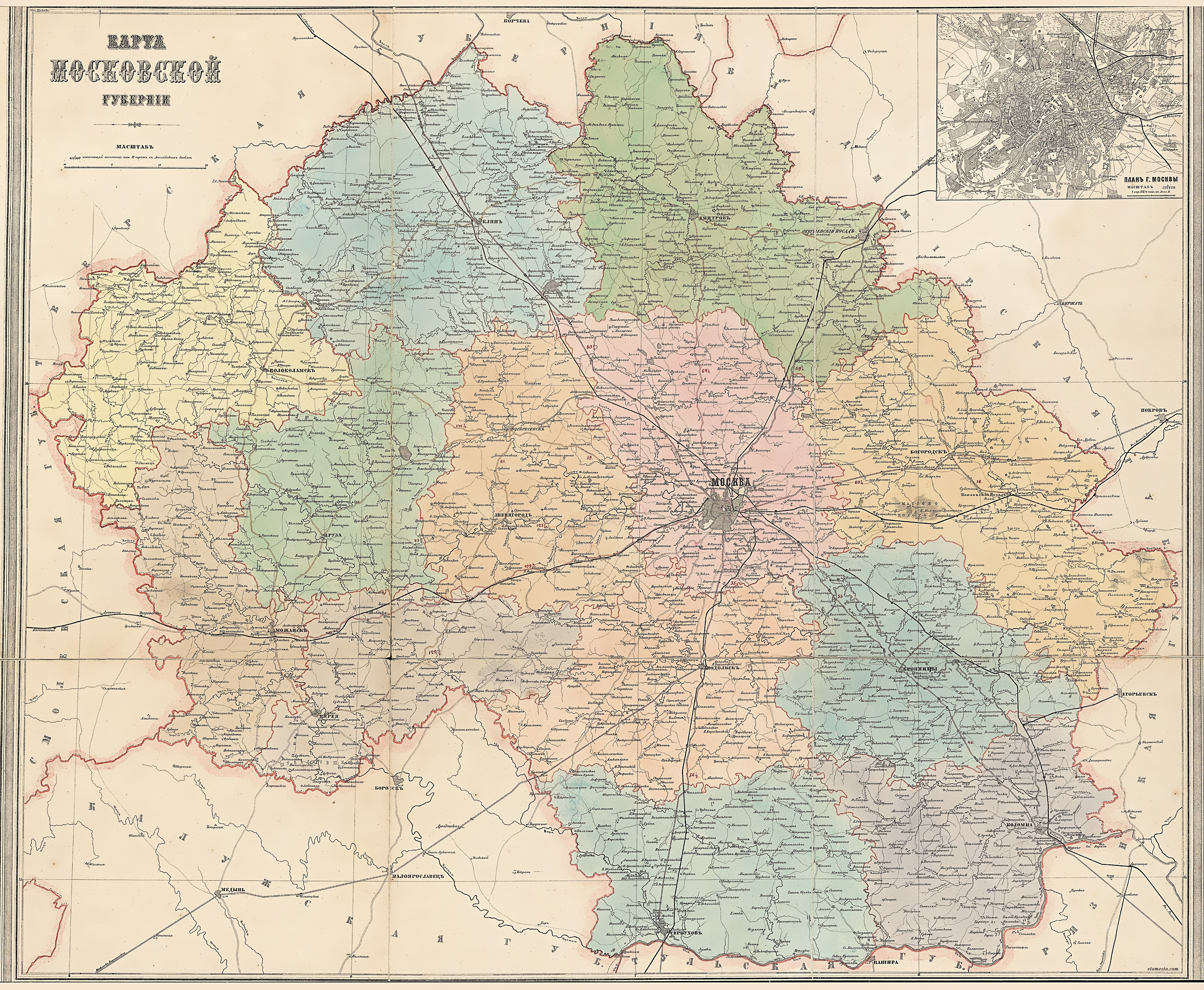
Map of Moscow Governorate in 1873 with uyezds

The Moscow Governorate (Note: Russian: Моско́вская губе́рния, pre-reform orthography: Моско́вская губе́рнія, romanized: Moskóvskaya gubérniya) was a province (guberniya) of the Tsardom of Russia, and the Russian Empire. It was bordered by Tver Governorate to the north, Vladimir Governorate to the northeast, Ryazan Governorate to the southeast, Tula Governorate to the south, Kaluga Governorate to the southwest, and Smolensk Governorate to the west. Moscow Governorate consisted of an area of 33,272.84 square kilometres (12,846.72 mi^{2}) and a population of 2,430,581 in 1897. Its capital was in Moscow.

== Administrative division ==
The counties (uezds) of the Moscow Governorate in 1897 were as follows:

County		Capital	Area	Population (1897 census)
Transliteration name	Russian Cyrillic	Capital	Area	Population (1897 census)
Bogorodsky	Богородскій	Bogorodsk (Noginsk)	3,068.5 square versts (3,492.1 km^{2}; 1,348.3 mi^{2})	222,341
Bronnitsky	Бронницкій	Bronnitsy	2,051 square versts (2,334 square kilometres; 901 square miles)	130,304
Vereysky	Верейскій	Vereya	1,623.3 square versts (1,847.4 square kilometres; 713.3 square miles)	54,074
Volokolamsky	Волоколамскій	Volokolamsk	2,138 square versts (2,433 square kilometres; 939 square miles)	80,984
Dmitrovsky Uyezd	Дмитровскій	Dmitrov	2,974.6 square versts (3,385.3 square kilometres; 1,307.1 square miles)	119,686
Zvenigorodsky	Звенигородскій	Zvenigorod	2,012.3 square versts (2,290.1 square kilometres; 884.2 square miles)	84,375
Klinsky	Клинскій	Klin	3,095.9 square versts (3,523.3 square kilometres; 1,360.4 square miles)	115,162
Kolomensky	Коломенскій	Kolomna	1,861.4 square versts (2,118.4 square kilometres; 817.9 square miles)	111,927
Mozhaysky	Можайскій	Mozhaysk	1,621.5 square versts (1,845.4 square kilometres; 712.5 square miles)	53,967
Moskovsky	Московскій	Moscow	2,393 square versts (2,723 square kilometres; 1,052 square miles)	1,203,926
Podolsky	Подольскій	Podolsk	2,160.4 square versts (2,458.7 square kilometres; 949.3 square miles)	86,311
Ruzsky	Рузскій	Ruza	1,984.1 square versts (2,258.0 square kilometres; 871.8 square miles)	55,522
Serpukhovsky	Серпуховскій	Serpukhov	2,252.4 square versts (2,563.4 square kilometres; 989.7 square miles)	112,002

== History ==
Moscow Governorate, together with seven other governorates, was established on December 29 [O.S. December 18], 1708, by Tsar Peter the Great's edict. As with the rest of the governorates, initially, neither the borders nor internal subdivisions of Moscow Governorate were defined; instead, the territory was defined as a set of cities and the lands adjacent to those cities. Later, Moscow Governorate was subdivided into 13 uyezds.

Cities included into Moscow Governorate at the time of its establishment
#	City	#	City	#	City
1.	Moscow	14.	Lyubim	27.	Suzdal
2.	Aleksin	15.	Medyn	28.	Tarussa
3.	Borovsk	16.	Mikhaylov	29.	Tsarev Borisov
4.	Dedilov	17.	Mozhaysk	30.	Tula
5.	Dmitrov	18.	Obolensk	31.	Veneva
6.	Gremyachey	19.	Pecherniki	32.	Vereya
7.	Kaluga	20.	Pereslavl Ryazanskoy	33.	Volodimir
8.	Klin	21.	Pereslavl Zaleskoy	34.	Volokolamsk
9.	Kolomna	22.	Pronsk	35.	Yaroslavets Maly
10.	Koshira	23.	Rostov	36.	Yepifan
11.	Kostroma	24.	Ruza	37.	Yuryev Polskoy
12.	Krapivna	25.	Serpukhov	38.	Zaraysk
13.	Lukh	26.	Shuya	39.	Zvenigorod

The governorate underwent numerous changes in the following years, and was finally abolished on January 14, 1929 when modern Moscow Oblast was created.

== Demography ==
=== Language ===
- Population by mother tongue according to the Imperial census of 1897.

Language	Number	percentage (%)	males	females
Russian	2,371,102	97.5	1,181,296	1,189,806
German	19,116	0.7	9,225	9,891
Polish	10,960	0.4	7,676	3,284
Jewish	5,756	0.2	3,795	1,961
Ukrainian	5,506	0.2	4,838	668
Tatar	5,469	0.2	4,492	977
French	2,621	0.1	1,035	1,586
Armenian	1,633	0.0	1,201	432
Belarusian	1,292	0.0	948	344
English	1,135	0.0	559	576
Latvian	1,018	0.0	731	287
Lithuanian	690	0.0	600	90
Czech	636	0.0	397	239
Gypsy	511	0.0	249	262
Estonian	396	0.0	243	153
Italian	374	0.0	220	154
Greek	292	0.0	241	51
Swedish	228	0.0	117	111
Chuvash	152	0.0	147	5
Komi	148	0.0	144	4
Bulgarian	110	0.0	100	10
Other	1,436	0.0	1,013	423
Total	2,430,581	100.0	1,219,267	1,211,314

=== Religion ===
- According to the Imperial census of 1897.

Religion	Number	percentage (%)	males	females
Pravoslavs (Note: Eastern Orthodox, including Russian Orthodox, Greek Orthodox, and Georgian Orthodox)	2,272,145	93.5	1,139,289	1,132,856
Old Believers and others split from Pravoslavs	99,825	4.1	44,682	55,143
Lutherans	21,437	0.8	10,701	10,736
Roman Catholic	17,670	0.7	11,497	6,173
Judaism	8,704	0.3	5,400	3,304
Islam	5,605	0.2	4,678	927
Reformed	2,218	0.0	1,088	1,130
Armenian Gregorians	1,640	0.0	1,188	452
Anglicans	838	0.0	441	397
Karaites	347	0.0	210	137
Armenian Catholic Church	25	0.0	18	7
Buddhists, Lamaists	11	0.0	11	0
Mennonites	3	0.0	3	0
Other: Christian denominations	103	0.0	52	51
Other: non-Christians	10	0.0	9	1
Total	2,430,581	100.0	1,219,267	1,211,314
