= Luzhetsky Monastery =

Coordinates: 55°31′17″N 36°0′30″E

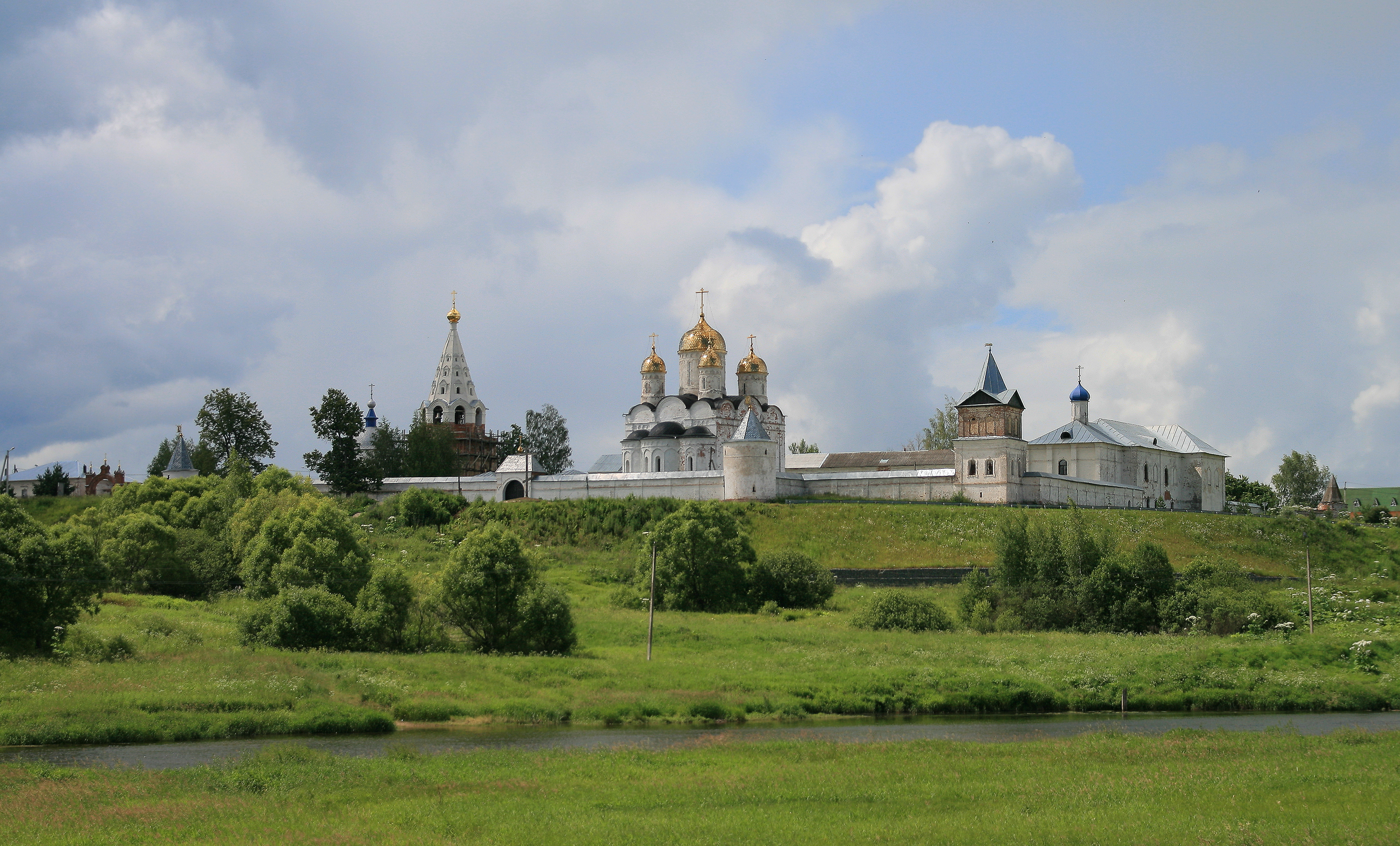
- Panorama of the monastery from the other bank of the river
- Interactive map of Luzhetsky Monastery

Monastery information
- Full name: Богородице-Рождественский Ферапонтов Лужецкий монастырь
- Order: Russian Orthodox Church
- Established: 1408, 1994
- Disestablished: 1929
- Diocese: Diocese of Moscow

People
- Founder: Therapont of Belozersk

Site
- Location: Mozhaysk, Moscow Oblast, Russia
- Public access: Yes

Luzhetsky Monastery, whose complete name is the Nativity of the Theotokos and St. Therapont Luzhetsky Monastery (Russian: Богородице-Рождественский Ферапонтов Лужецкий монастырь), is a medieval fortified monastery in Mozhaysk, Moscow Oblast, Russia. It is protected as a cultural monument of federal significance.

The monastery was founded in 1408 by Therapont of Belozersk. Therapont founded the Ferapontov Monastery in 1398, located in the Principality of Beloozero, which at the time was administered jointly with the Principality of Mozhaysk. The prince, Andrey of Mozhaysk, resided in Mozhaysk, and was a brother of Vasily, the Grand Prince of Moscow. He was also one of the main sponsors of the monastery. In 1408, he sent a letter to Therapont urging him to come to Mozhaysk, and Therapont was obliged to obey. Even though Therapont, after arriving to Mozhaysk, expressed very clearly his wish to return to the White Lake, the prince never let him go. They made a deal, and Therapont founded the Luzhetsky Monastery in Mozhaysk. He died in the monastery in 1426 and was buried there. He was canonized by the Russian Orthodox Church.

The original cathedral was demolished in the first half of the 16th century, and a five-dome stone cathedral was built in 1524-1547, which still stands today. Mozhaysk, together with the monastery, was transferred to the Grand Duchy of Moscow in the middle of the 16th century. The history of the monastery in the 15th century is somewhat unclear; it is known that in 1523 the hegumen of Luzhetsky Monastery was Makary, who later became the Metropolitan of Moscow. The monastery was considerably damaged during the Time of Troubles in the 1610s, when it was plundered. Most of the current architecture of the monastery, including the bell-tower, the Transfiguration Church, and the cells, were built in the 17th century. In 1812, during the Napoleonic Wars, the Luzhetsky monastery was briefly occupied and plundered by the advancing French army. In 1929, it was closed by the Soviets. During the Soviet period it was plundered and badly damaged, though some restoration work was done in the 1960s and 1970s. In 1994 it was given back to the Russian Orthodox Church. On 26 May 1999 the relics of Therapont were found.
