= Therapont of Belozersk =

Saint Therapont of Belozersk
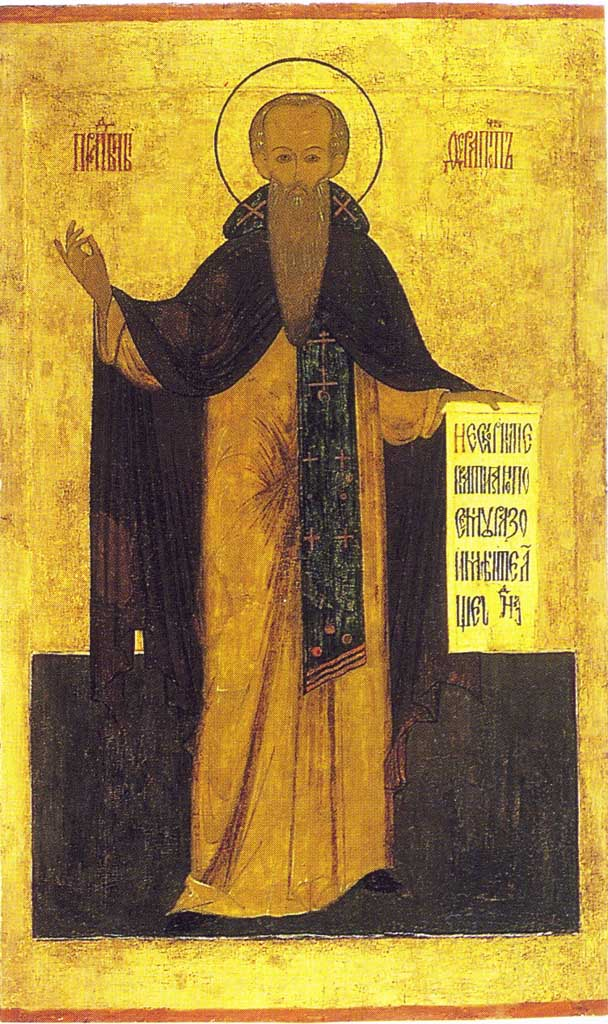
- Icon of St. Therapont

Abbot, Venerable
- Born: 1337; Volokolamsk
- Died: 27 May 1426
- Honored in: Eastern Orthodox Church
- Canonized: 1549
- Feast: 27 May; 27 December (uncovering of relics)

Therapont of Belozersk (1331 – 27 May 1426) (Russian: Ферапонт Бело(е)зерский, Therapont Belo(e)zersky), also known as Therapont of Mozhaysk, known to the world as Feodor Poskochin, was a Russian Orthodox monk credited with the foundation of the Ferapontov Monastery in Northern Russia, now close to Kirillov in Vologda Oblast, and the Luzhetsky Monastery in Mozhaysk close to Moscow. Therapont is venerated as a saint of the Russian Orthodox Church.

== Life ==
Therapont was born as Fyodor Poskochin in a noble family in Volokolamsk in the 1330s. As an adult, he decided to become a monk and arrived to the Simonov Monastery in Moscow. There he get acquainted with Cyril, who was to become later Cyril of White Lake. Apparently, Therapont was once commissioned by the monastery to travel to the North of Russia, to the Lake Beloye area. At a certain point, Cyril decided to leave the monastery and seek for a remote area where he could become a hermit. Ferapont agreed to accompany him and suggested that the Lake Beloye area would be most appropriate for that.

Between 1390 and 1397 Cyril and Therapont left the Simonov monastery and travelled north to Lake Siverskoye, where they stayed in the place which eventually became Kirillo-Belozersky Monastery. For a year they lived together, and then Therapont left and moved to a location in about a dozen kilometers to the northeast now known as Ferapontovo. 1398 is considered as the year when the Ferapontov Monastery was founded. At the beginning, there were not more than 15 monks living in the monastery. Ferapont refused to become a hegumen, but lived for ten years at the monastery.

The monastery was located in the Principality of Beloozero, which at the time was administered jointly with the Principality of Mozhaysk. The prince, Andrey of Mozhaysk, resided in Mozhaysk, and was a brother of Vasily, the Grand Prince of Moscow. He was also one of the main sponsors of the monastery. In 1408, he sent a letter to Therapont urging him to come to Mozhaysk, and Therapont was obliged to obey. Even though Therapont, after arriving to Mozhaysk, expressed very clearly his wish to return to White Lake, the prince never let him go. They made a deal, and Therapont founded Luzhetsky Monastery in Mozhaysk. He died in the monastery in 1426.

== Veneration ==
Therapont has been venerated as a saint since 1549. He is commemorated on 27 May, the date of his repose, and 27 December, the date his relics were discovered.
