= Cathedral of St. Nicholas (Mozhaysk) =

Coordinates: 55°30′33″N 36°00′38″E

The Cathedral of St. Nicholas
- Ново-Никольский собор
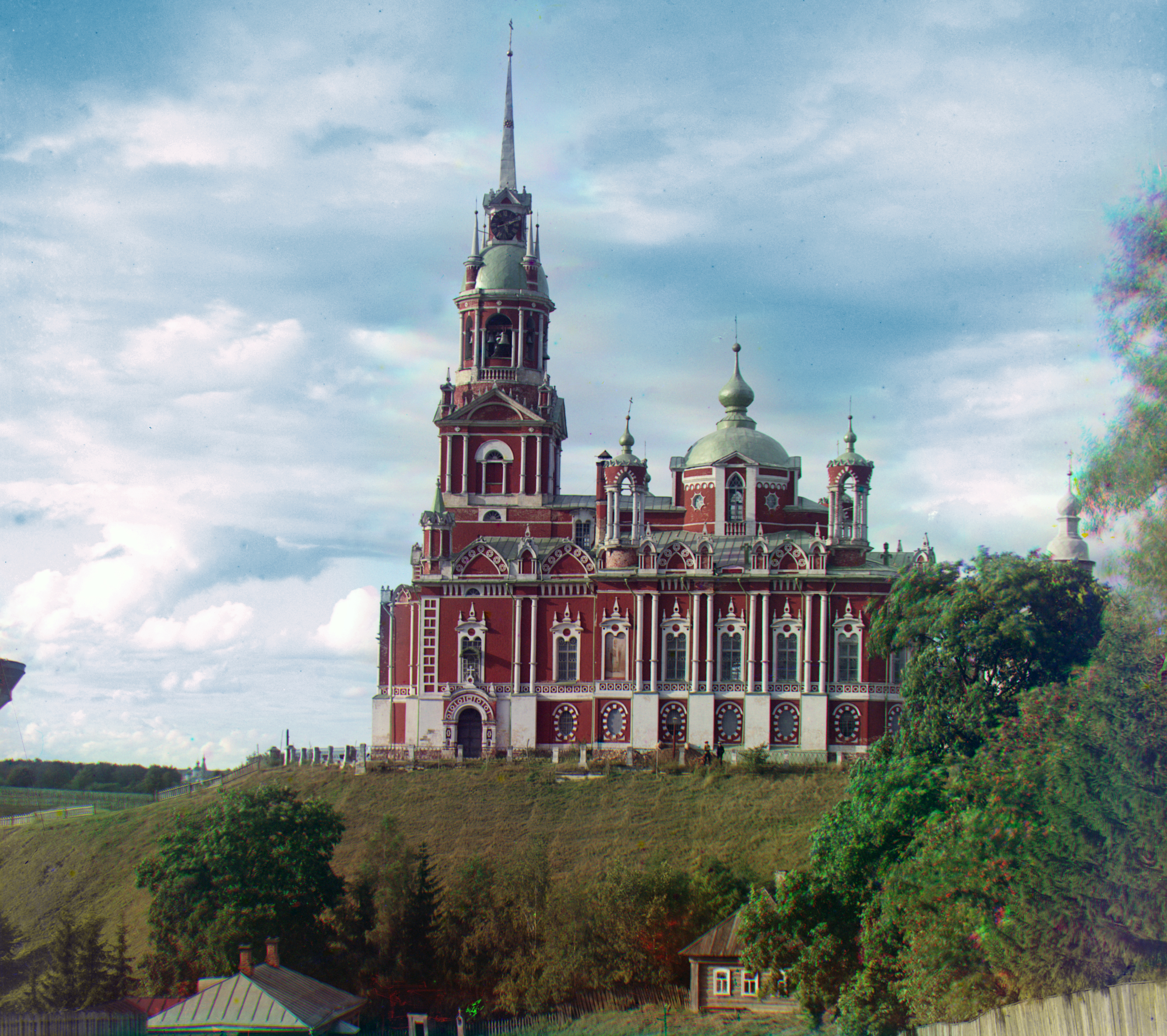
- The Cathedral between 1911 and 1912, photo by Sergei Prokudin-Gorskii
- The Cathedral of St. Nicholas
- Country: Russia
- Denomination: Russian Orthodox Church

History
- Status: Active

Architecture
- Architect: Alexey Bakarev
- Architectural type: Gothic Revival
- Years built: 12
- Completed: 1814

The Cathedral of St. Nicholas is the cathedral in Mozhaysk city of Moscow region, Russia, located in the territory of former Mozhaysk Kremlin. The first church on its place was constructed in the early 12th century; then it was rebuilt and restored several times. The current building was constructed in 1802–1814 and consecrated to Saint Nicholas in 1816. It significantly differs from typical Russian Orthodox churches and is one of the very few Neo Gothic cathedrals in the country.

== History ==
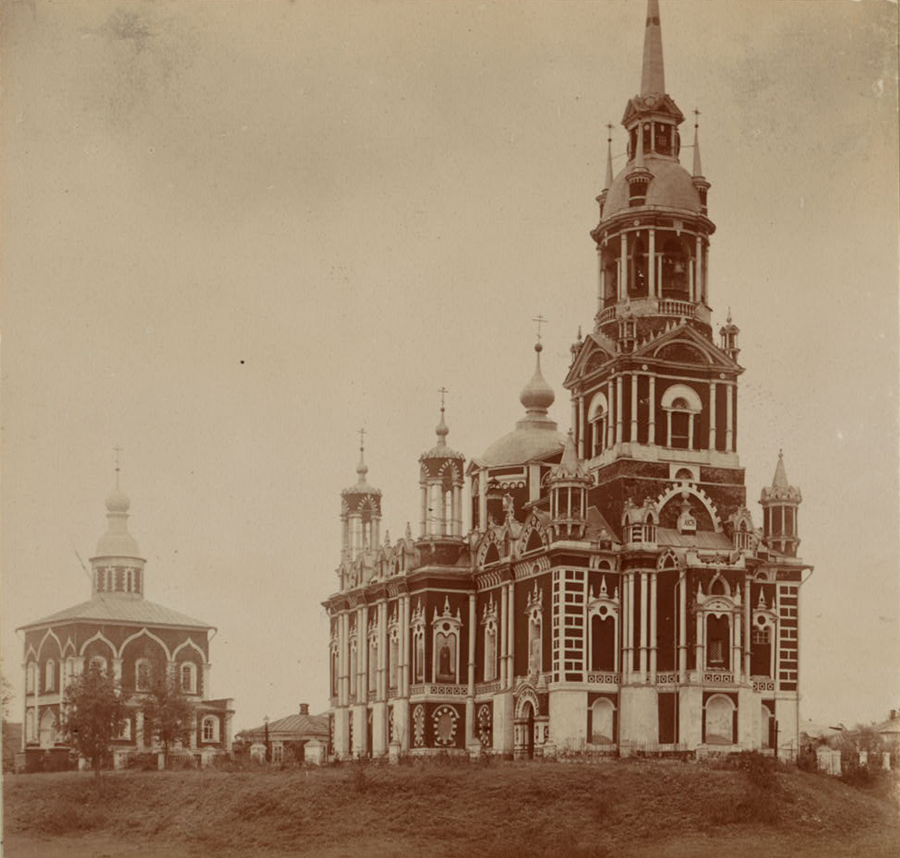
The cathedral in 1911

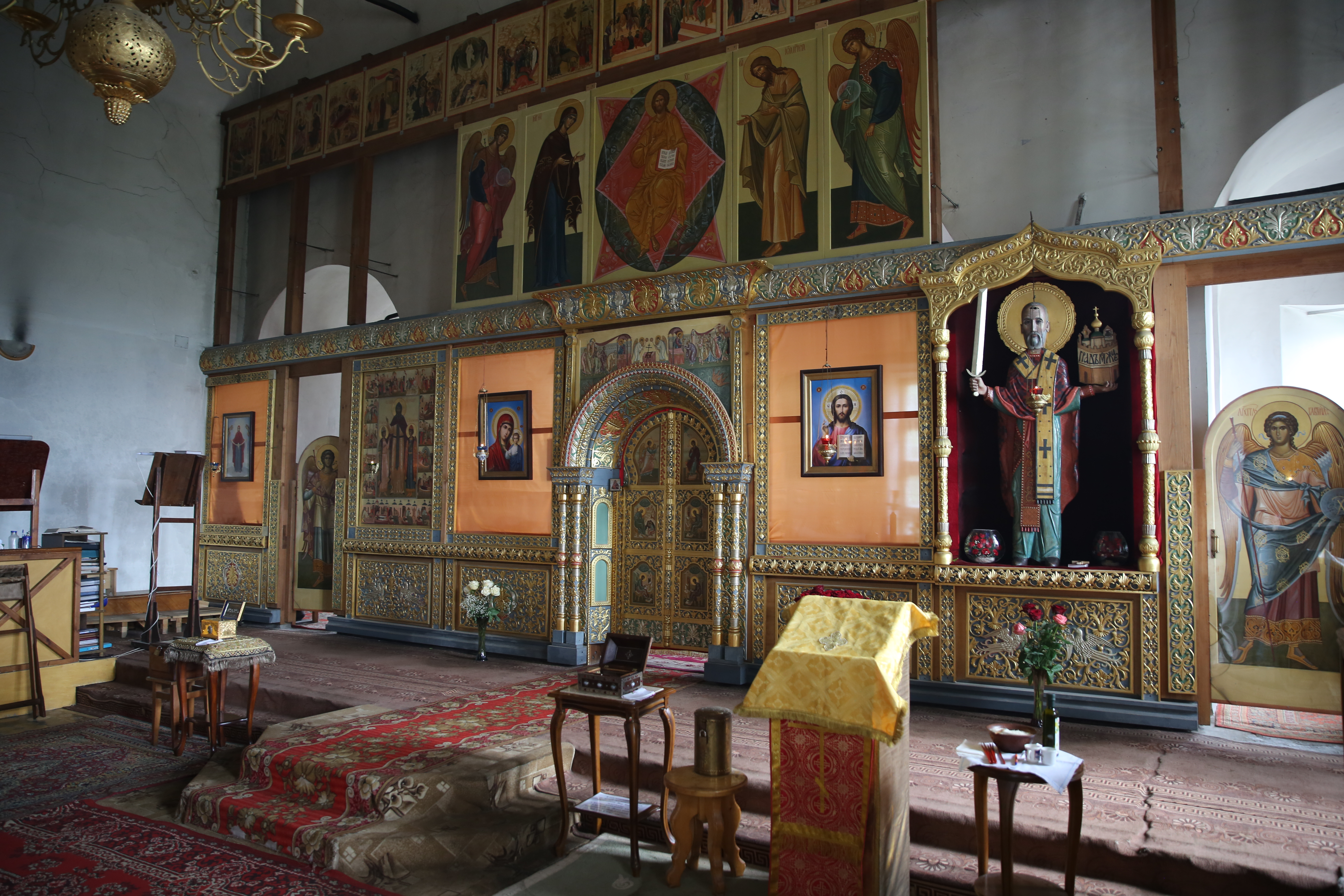
The interior, 2018

=== Early history ===
The first fortified detinets existed in the Mozhaysk as early as in the 12th century. The ricetto entrance to the fortress had a gate tower with a small church inside. This fact is based on archaeological evidence — Byzantine amphorae for oil and wine.

One of the first stone buildings within the Kremlin walls was St. Nicholas Cathedral, built in the early 14th century. It was named 'Nikolskiy', later — 'Staro-Nikolsky'. It very much resembled the Dormition Cathedral in Zvenigorod. The wooden statue of Saint Nicholas of Mozhaysk was carved for that cathedral, but later moved to the Church Over-the-gates.

=== Church of the Elevation of the Holy Cross (15th century) ===
At the end of the 15th century the St Nicholas Gates with the Church of the Elevation of the Holy Cross were built. The stone for the construction was brought from Myachkovo. There are several versions regarding the precise date. According to Russian historian Grigory Mokeev, the church was built in 1470 under the rule of Prince Yury Vasiliyevich of Dmitrov. Another scientist A. G. Savin names years 1481–1493, under the command of Andrey Vasilyevich Bolshoy of Uglich. Based on the examination of masonry, S. A. Sharov-Delone and I. I. Kondratyev attributed the church to 1460s.

The very first written evidence of the church goes back to 1536. In 1618 the fortress was blasted, the gates and the Church of the Elevation of the Holy Cross were almost destroyed. In 1624—1626 the Kremlin was rebuilt.

=== New Cathedral of St. Nicholas (1683–1685) ===
In 1683-1685 the tower and the Church of the Elevation of the Holy Cross were rebuilt by order of Patriarch Joachim of Moscow. The gate church was renamed into the New Nikolskiy Cathedral (or Upper), while the historical city cathedral was renamed into the Old Nikolsky Cathedral (or Lower).

In May 1782 the state ordered to demolish old Kremlin walls in Kolomna, Serpukhov and Mozhaysk due to their dilapidation. In 1802 the Mozhaysk Kremlin was deconstructed, the bricks and stones were used in the new Nikolskiy Cathedral.

=== New Nikolskiy Cathedral (1802–1814) ===
The project of the new cathedral was developed by Alexey Bakarev, a student of famous Russian architect Matvey Kazakov. The old cathedral and tower church were used in the new building, the church's side-altar was deconstructed to the bottom and rebuilt 3 meters wider. The gates were filled up with the bricks, the bell-tower was replaced with the new rotunda dome, flanked by four Moorish towers. The new tall bell tower was built from the West. The walls were made 2.5 bricks thick. The construction started in 1802 and finished only in 1814.

The almost finished cathedral was badly damaged in 1812. The retreating French troops burned it down, the altar screens and bell tower collapsed, destroyed by fire. The icon of Saint Nicholas of Mozhaysk and some church plates were safely stored in the cellar and survived the fire. After the war the cathedral was restored, finished in 1814 and consecrated in 1816.

=== 20th century ===
After the Russian Revolution most of the cathedral's relics and church plates disappeared, some of them taken to the museums, some lost. The new Soviet government led strict anticlerical policy and banned all church services. In 1933 the cathedral was closed for worship.

During the World War II, in 1941 the Mozhaysk Kremlin was used as an internment camp. The rotunda and the roof were demolished in the fights in 1941–1942.

Only in the 1960s the cathedral was partially restored, however, the rotunda was not rebuilt, and the tower clock was removed and transferred to the Borodino museum. Till the 1980s the building was used as a knitting workshop.

== Modern times ==
In 1994 the cathedral was returned to the Russian Orthodox Church. Now it is used for church services, though the restoration is still in progress. In 2019 the Moscow region governor announced that a new project of complete scientific restoration would be finished in May 2020.
