= Enchantment (novel) =

1999 novel by Orson Scott Card

- First edition cover (1999).
- Author: Orson Scott Card
- Audio read by: Stefan Rudnicki
- Cover artist: Greg Spalenka
- Language: English
- Genre: Fantasy
- Publisher: Del Rey
- Publication date: 1999
- Publication place: United States
- Media type: Print (Hardcover & Paperback)
- Pages: 415
- ISBN: 0-345-41687-2
- OCLC: 40500844
- Dewey Decimal: 813/.54 21
- LC Class: PS3553.A655 E495 1999

Enchantment is an English language fantasy novel by American writer Orson Scott Card. First published in 1999, the novel is based on the Ukrainian version of Sleeping Beauty and other folk tales. Various forms of magic, potions, and immortal deities also play an important role in the story.

== Plot ==
The protagonist and narrator is Ivan Smetski, a young Ukrainian-American linguist who specializes in Old Church Slavonic, a language from 10th-century Ruthenia. In 1992, Ivan returns to his native town of Kyiv to pursue additional graduate studies. While there he re-discovers the body of a woman that he had seen as a child, apparently sleeping in the woods. He awakens her with a kiss, and she tells him, in Old Church Slavonic, that she is Katerina, a princess of the kingdom of Taina.

Transported back to the 10th century, Ivan follows Katerina back to Taina where he finds the Christian kingdom terrorized by the traditional Russian arch-villainess Baba Yaga. Ivan and Katerina marry and escape back to the 20th century to avoid the machinations of Baba Yaga, who has enslaved a god and laid claim to Taina's throne, and the druzhinnik Dimitri who covets the throne. Baba Yaga's magical powers, however, allow her to follow Ivan and Katerina to modern times.

Back in Ukraine, Ivan discovers that his cousin is in reality the immortal god Mikola Mozhaiski. Returning to the United States, Ivan further discovers that his mother is a magic user, with the same powers as Katerina. After Katerina discovers Dimitri's plot through scrying, Ivan and Katerina return to Taina, deftly avoiding Baba Yaga who magically "skyjacks" their intended Boeing 747 back to the 10th century. Returning to Taina, Ivan and Katerina confront Dimitri, the enslaved god, and Baba Yaga. Though the Castle of Taina is destroyed, the two emerge victorious and they live out their lives between the modern world and Taina.

== Creation and inspiration ==
In a 1998 interview given during work on the novel, Card stated that he had realized he knew little about Slavic history and suggested that the novel was inspired by extensive research in the area. In 2008, Card also credited singer/songwriter Bruce Cockburn's album The Charity of Night as an influence on his writing of the book. In the same article, he stated that he believed Enchantment might be his best novel.
