= Ferapontovo =

Village in Kirillovsky District, Vologda Oblast, Russia

Coordinates: 59°57′N 38°34′E

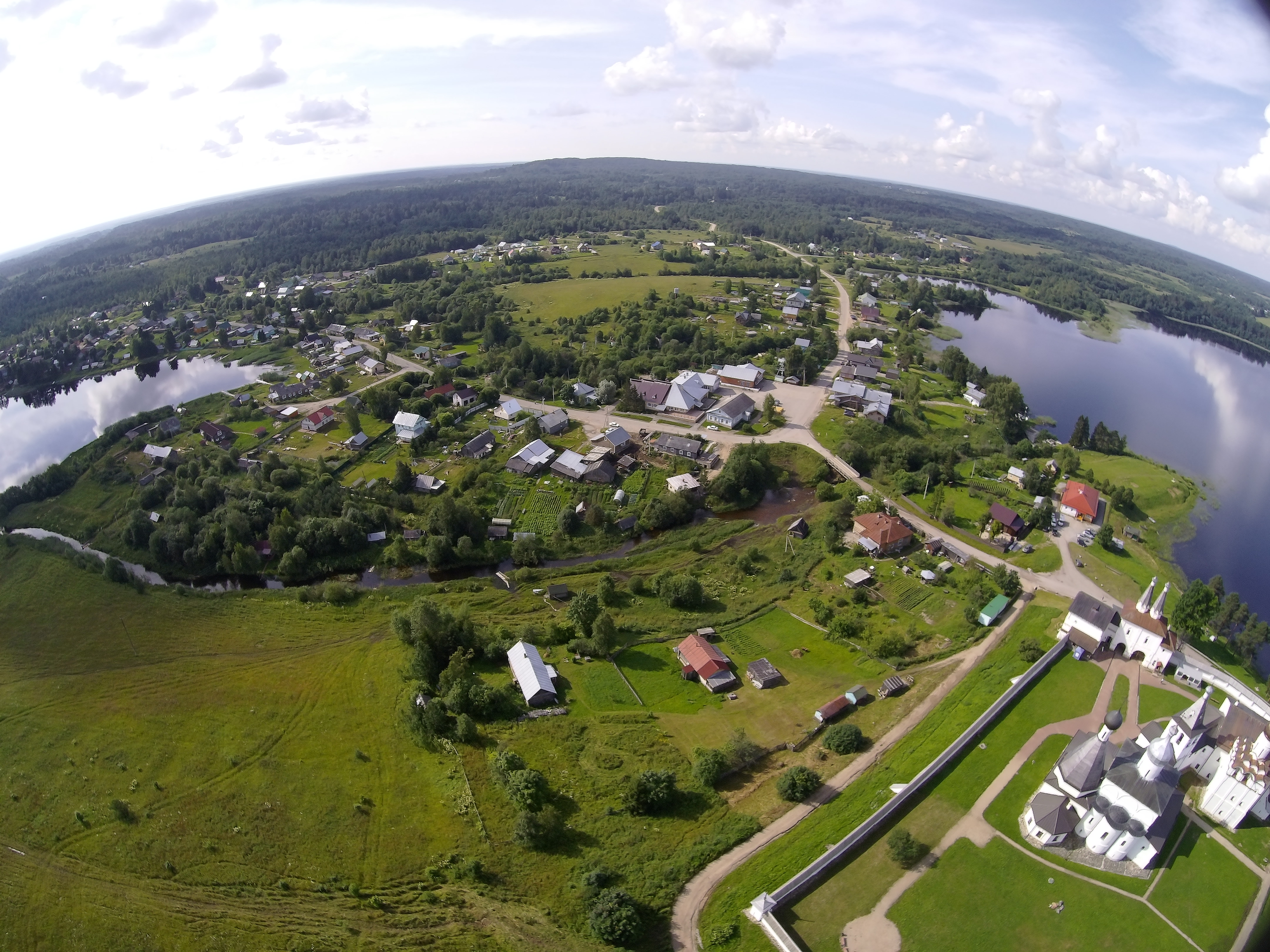
Aerial view of Ferapontovo

Ferapontovo is a village in Kirillovsky District, Vologda Oblast, Russia, containing the Ferapontov Monastery.
