= Mozhaysk =

Town in Moscow Oblast, Russia

Mozhaysk Можайск
- Town
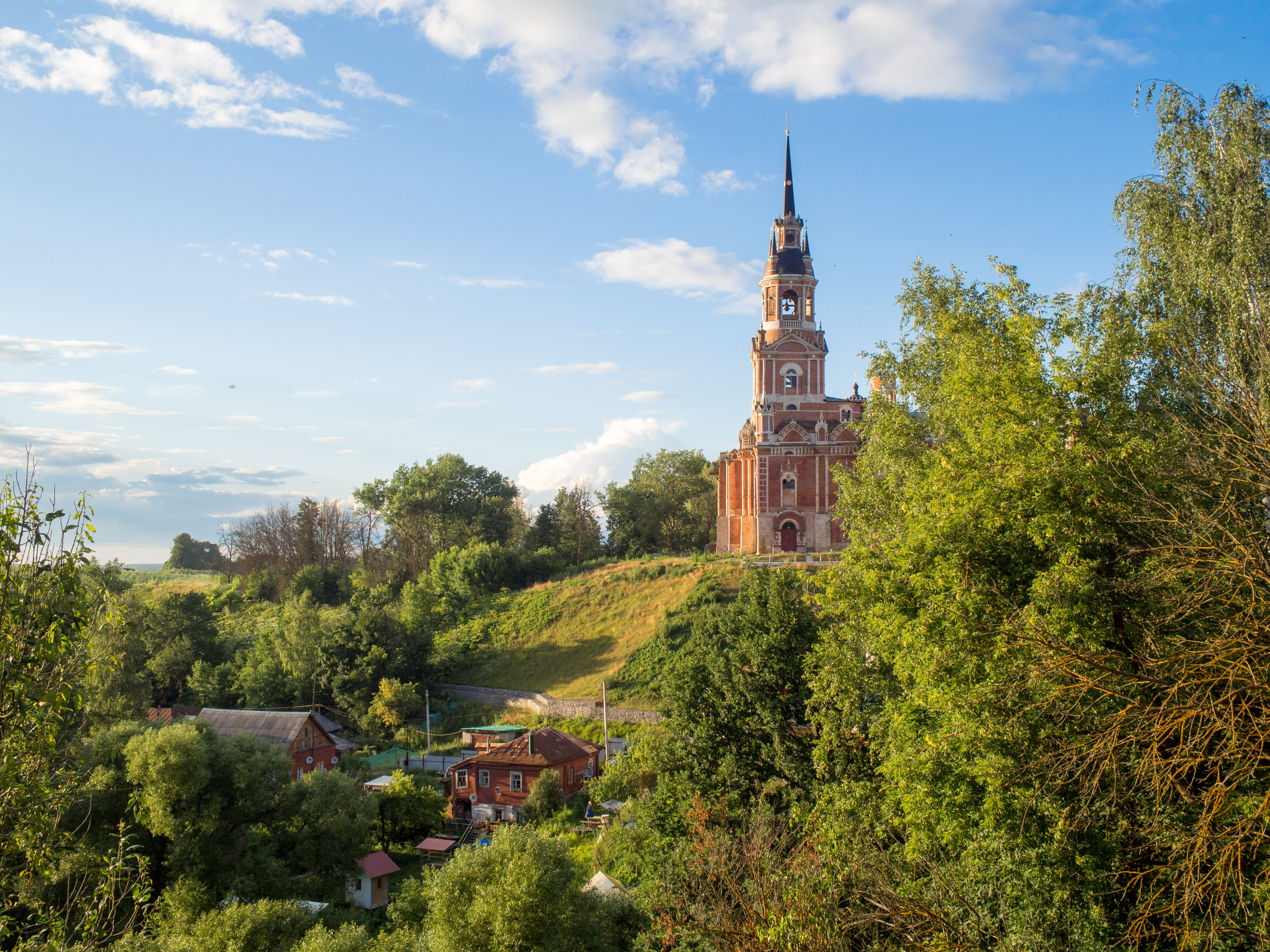

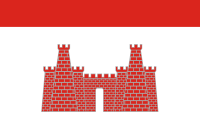
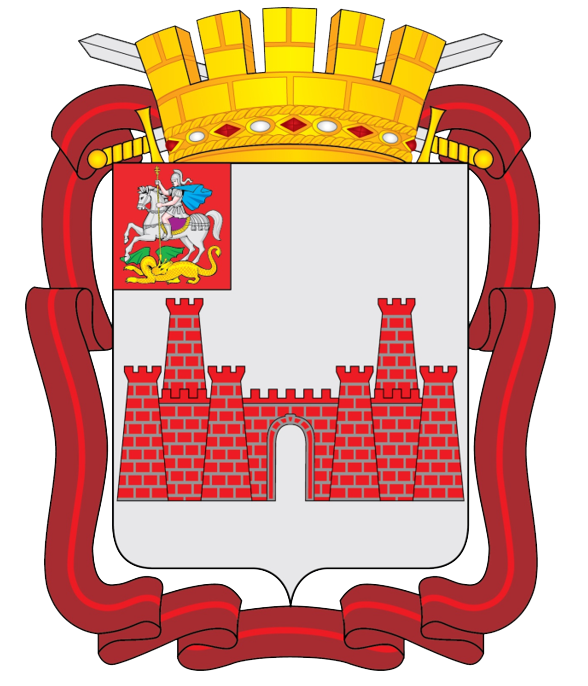
- Flag Coat of arms
- Interactive map of Mozhaysk
- Location of Mozhaysk Mozhaysk (Moscow Oblast)
- Coordinates: 55°31′N 36°02′E
- Country: Russia
- Federal subject: Moscow Oblast
- Administrative district: Mozhaysky District
- TownSelsoviet: Mozhaysk
- First mentioned: 1231
- Town status since: 1708
- Elevation: 210 m (690 ft)

Population (2010 Census)
  - Total: 31,363
  - Estimate (2025): 32,516 (+3.7%)

Administrative status
  - Capital of: Mozhaysky District, Town of Mozhaysk

Municipal status
  - Municipal district: Mozhaysky Municipal District
  - Urban settlement: Mozhaysk Urban Settlement
  - Capital of: Mozhaysk Municipal District, Mozhaysk Urban Settlement
- Time zone: UTC+3 (MSK)
- Postal codes: 143200–143204, 143210
- Dialing code: +7 49638
- OKTMO ID: 46545000001
- Website: gpmozhaysk.ru

Mozhaysk (Note: Alternative transliterations include Mozhaisk, Mozhajsk, Mozhaĭsk, and Možajsk.) (Russian: Можа́йск, IPA: [mɐˈʐajsk]) is a town and the administrative center of Mozhaysky District in Moscow Oblast, Russia, located 110 kilometers (68 mi) to the west of Moscow, on the historic road leading to Smolensk and then to Poland. Population: 31,363 (2010 census); 31,459 (2002 census); 30,735 (1989 Soviet census).

== History ==
First mentioned in 1231 as an appanage of Chernigov; A theory says Mozhaysk took its name from the Mozhay (Mozhaya) River, whose name could be of Baltic origin (compare Lithuanian mažoji "small" - in contrast to the larger Moskva River nearby). Later Mozhaysk became an important stronghold of the Smolensk dynasty, in the 13th century ruled by Duke (later Saint) Theodore the Black. Muscovites seized Mozhaysk in 1303, but in the course of the following century had serious troubles defending it against Algirdas (Grand Duke of Lithuania from 1345 to 1377). A younger brother of the ruling Grand Duke of Moscow usually held the Principality of Mozhaysk - until the practice was dropped in 1493. In 1562 Denmark and Russia signed the Treaty of Mozhaysk there during the Livonian War of 1558–1583. In 1708 the administration of Peter the Great granted town status to Mozhaysk.

Mozhaysk played a role in defending the Western approaches to Moscow in the 19th and 20th centuries. During the French invasion of Russia in 1812 the Battle of Borodino took place 12 kilometers (7.5 mi) from the town.

In World War II, the German Wehrmacht took Mozhaysk on October 18, 1941; the Soviet Red Army re-captured it on January 20, 1942.

== Administrative and municipal status ==
Within the framework of administrative divisions, Mozhaysk serves as the administrative center of Mozhaysky District. As an administrative division, it is, together with twenty-one rural localities, incorporated within Mozhaysky District as the Town of Mozhaysk. As a municipal division, the Town of Mozhaysk is incorporated within Mozhaysky Municipal District as Mozhaysk Urban Settlement.

== Architecture ==
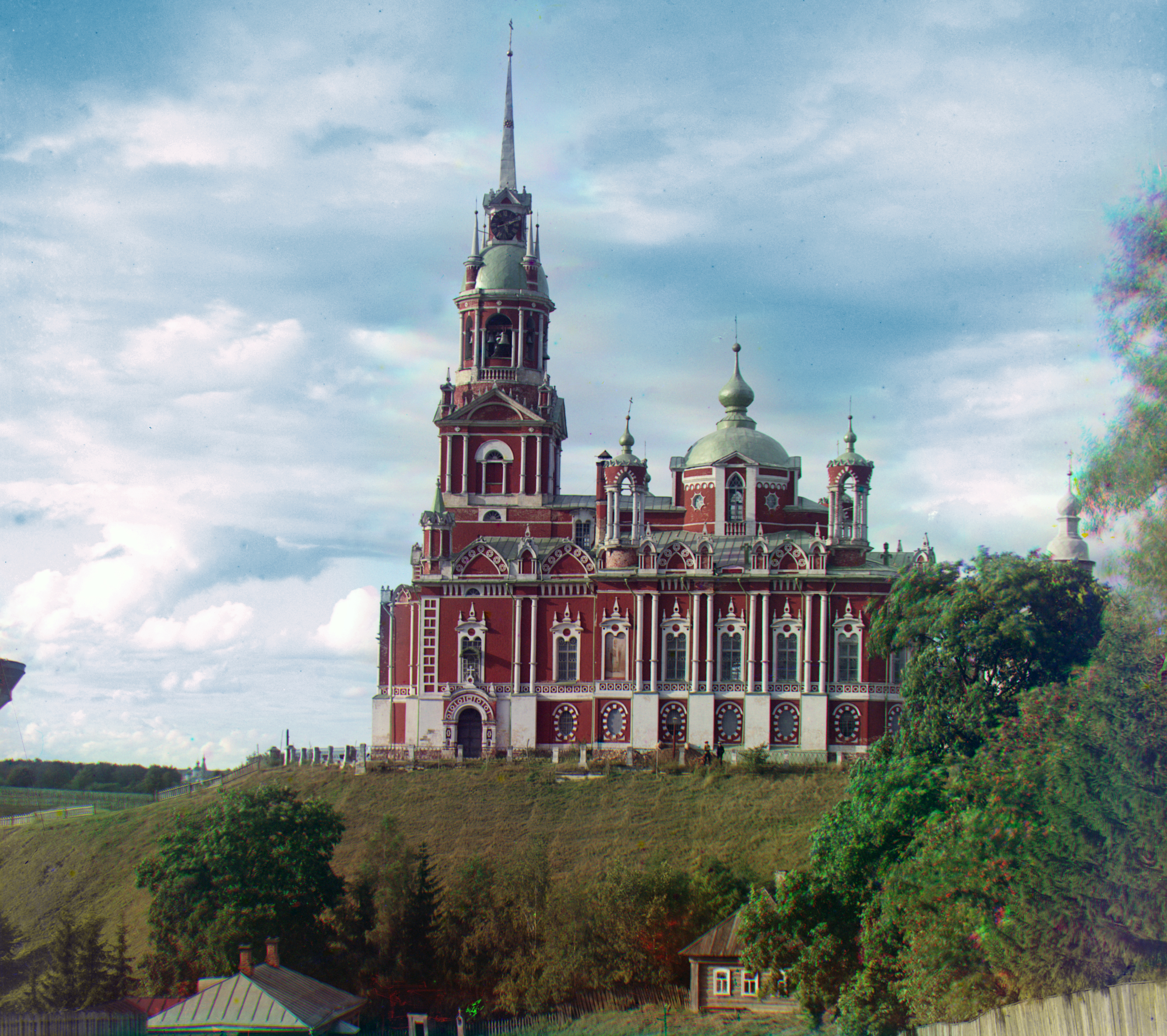
The Cathedral of St. Nicholas, constructed in 1802–1814

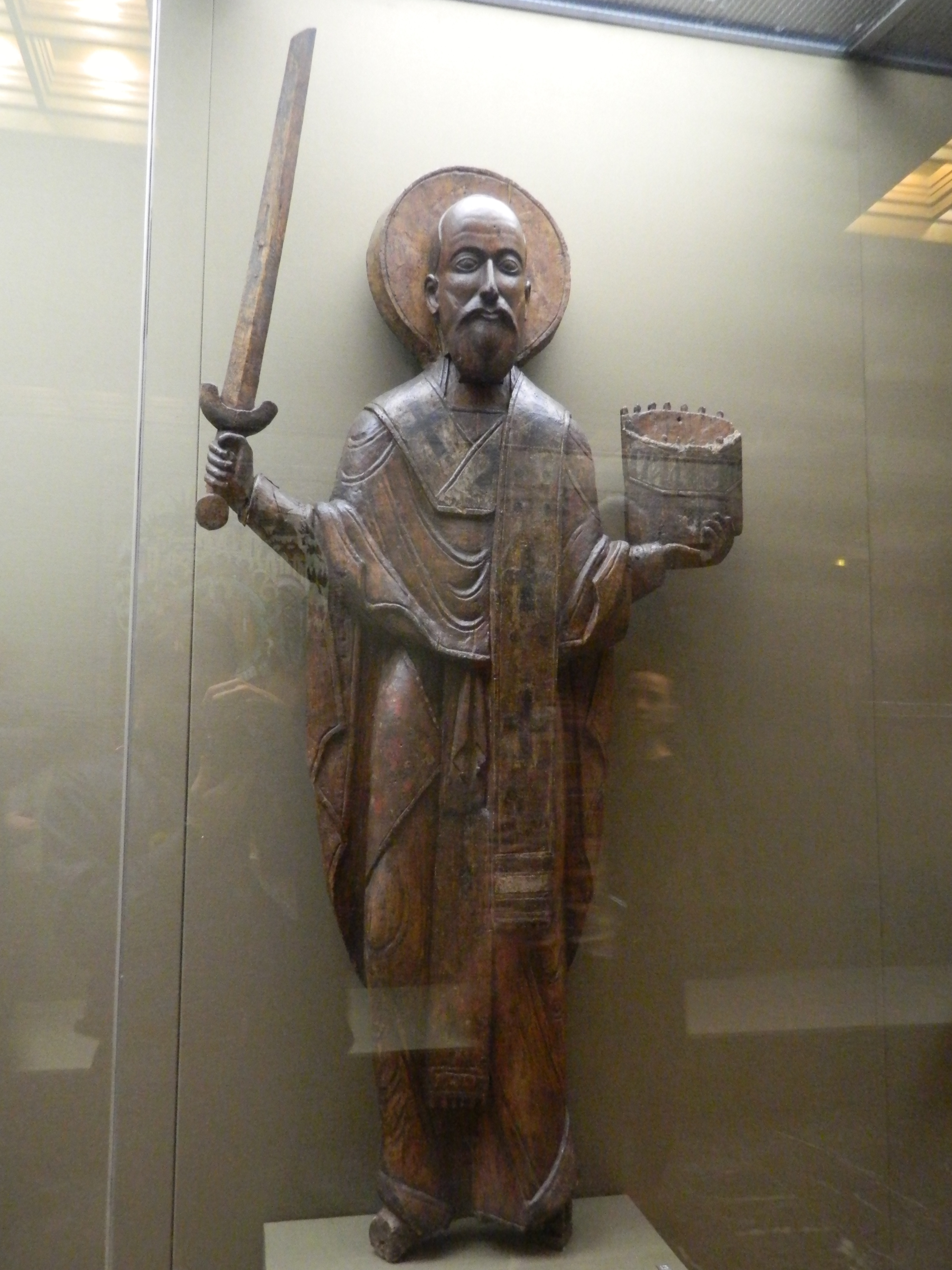
The wooden statue of Saint Nicholas of Mozhaysk, 14th century

The first stone cathedral was built in the kremlin in the early 14th century and named Nikolskiy (then Staro-Nikolsky) Cathedral. It very much resembled the Dormition Cathedral in Zvenigorod. At that time the wooden statue of Saint Nicholas of Mozhaysk was carved by an unknown master and placed into the cathedral. Later the statue was moved to the Church Over-the-gates.

The first fortified Detinets existed in the Mozhaysk as early as in the 12th century. After the great fire of 1541, it was completely rebuilt by an order of Ivan the Terrible. Only in the early 17th century, the stone fortress was constructed, replaced with the Kremlin made of bricks in 1624–1626.

The Cathedral of St. Nicholas in the Gothic Revival style, designed by Aleksei Bakarev (Matvei Kazakov's student), started in 1802, but the building was ransacked by the retreating French troops in 1812. Only in 1814 the cathedral was completed and consecrated. The church of St. Joachim and Anna preserves some parts from the early 15th century. Another important landmark is the Luzhetsky Monastery, founded in 1408 by St. Ferapont and rebuilt in brick in the 16th century. The monastery cathedral, erected during the reign of Vasily III, was formerly known for its frescoes, ascribed to Dionisius' circle.

== Trivia ==
Mozhaysk was frequently the last major obstacle on the way to the capital and it gave birth to the expression "to push beyond Mozhay" (загнать за Можай, zagnat' za Mozhay), which literally means "to push (the enemy) beyond Mozhay". In modern usage, it means to "completely crush the enemy and push them away at a great distance". The phrase originated during the Polish Muscovite War when the Polish Army retreated to Mozhaysk following the Battle of Moscow (1612).

== Transport ==
Bus line 457 goes from the Mozhaysk autobus station to Park Pobedy in Moscow. Several bus and marshrutka services operate within Mozhaysk and connect the town with nearby localities, as well as with touristic sites in the fields of Borodino. Railway transport is also available. Suburban regular and express trains run between Mozhaysk railway station and Moscow. The minor railway platform Km. 109 of the Belorussky suburban railway line, located on the outskirts of the city, serves the adjacement settlement of Stroitel. Mozhaysk is also linked by train to Smolensk Oblast, with both short-distance services between the town and Vyazma and long-distance Lastochka trains on the Moscow-Smolensk route stopping at Mozhaysk.

== Climate ==
Mozhaysk has warm summer humid continental climate, Köppen: Dfb.

Climate data for Mozhaysk (1991–2020, extremes 1932–present)
Month	Jan	Feb	Mar	Apr	May	Jun	Jul	Aug	Sep	Oct	Nov	Dec	Year
Record high °C (°F)	8.2 (46.8)	9.4 (48.9)	19.4 (66.9)	28.4 (83.1)	32.0 (89.6)	33.8 (92.8)	37.0 (98.6)	37.7 (99.9)	31.5 (88.7)	24.4 (75.9)	15.7 (60.3)	9.6 (49.3)	37.7 (99.9)
Mean daily maximum °C (°F)	−4.2 (24.4)	−3.2 (26.2)	2.6 (36.7)	11.5 (52.7)	18.6 (65.5)	22.0 (71.6)	24.2 (75.6)	22.5 (72.5)	16.3 (61.3)	8.8 (47.8)	1.4 (34.5)	−2.7 (27.1)	9.8 (49.7)
Daily mean °C (°F)	−6.8 (19.8)	−6.7 (19.9)	−1.6 (29.1)	6.2 (43.2)	12.8 (55.0)	16.5 (61.7)	18.7 (65.7)	16.8 (62.2)	11.3 (52.3)	5.3 (41.5)	−0.9 (30.4)	−4.9 (23.2)	5.6 (42.0)
Mean daily minimum °C (°F)	−9.7 (14.5)	−10.1 (13.8)	−5.5 (22.1)	1.1 (34.0)	6.9 (44.4)	10.9 (51.6)	13.4 (56.1)	11.6 (52.9)	6.9 (44.4)	2.1 (35.8)	−3.1 (26.4)	−7.2 (19.0)	1.4 (34.6)
Record low °C (°F)	−44.0 (−47.2)	−38.0 (−36.4)	−32.5 (−26.5)	−19.9 (−3.8)	−6.1 (21.0)	−1.2 (29.8)	2.7 (36.9)	−0.5 (31.1)	−7.5 (18.5)	−18.9 (−2.0)	−27.8 (−18.0)	−41.7 (−43.1)	−44.0 (−47.2)
Average precipitation mm (inches)	42.2 (1.66)	36.1 (1.42)	34.2 (1.35)	32.8 (1.29)	66.6 (2.62)	77.2 (3.04)	90.0 (3.54)	68.4 (2.69)	58.3 (2.30)	60.1 (2.37)	47.1 (1.85)	44.8 (1.76)	657.8 (25.89)
Source: pogoda.ru.net

== Twin towns and sister cities ==
Mozhaysk is twinned with:

- Château-du-Loir, France
- Drochtersen, Germany
- Etropole, Bulgaria
- Lohja, Finland
- Pereiaslav, Ukraine
- Ujazd, Poland
- Vileyka, Belarus
