= Nicholas of Mozhaysk =

Russian variation of the Saint Nikolaus traditions

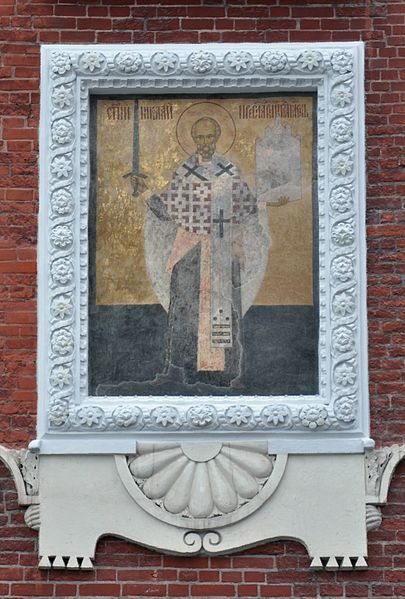
Icon of Saint Nicolas of Mozhaysk over gate of the Nikolskaya Tower of Moscow Kremlin

Saint Nicholas of Mozhaysk, or Nikola of Mozhaysk (Russian: Никола Можайский), is a Russian variation of the Saint Nikolaus traditions. According to the legend, during the 14th-century siege of Mozhaysk city by Mongols, the residents prayed to Saint Nicholas, who announced himself as a huge figure holding a sword in the right hand and the city of Mozhaisk on the palm of the left hand. After seeing such a frightful vision the Mongols retreated. The grateful citizen erected a wooden monument to Saint Nicholas as he was seen during his announcement. The motive became a popular plot for Russian icons and high-reliefs.

== Nicholas in Estonia ==
According to folklore researcher, Hele Bome, Saint Nikolai of Mozhaisk is remembered in an icon sculpted in high-relief. This icon became most popular as a protective image, especially favored by Setu peoples, who sometimes venerate the icon with loaves of bread or cream, and who often seek blessings on their agriculture and cattle-raising. However the main role attributed to this figure is as a protector of the crops from the cold.

Some texts specifically describe the saint as a warrior-hero (e.g., a white-bearded man who stands on top of the monastery wall and can't be touched by enemy fire). The icon stands with a sword raised, which figures in the initial legends as Nikolai appeared to during a war time, but which is explained in other stories as the Saint threatening to strike an old woman who did not believe in him.

These legends may include events actually experienced in the life of the missionary Abbot Cornelius of Petseri (near the Estonia-Russia border).

== Moscow Kremlin ==
The icon of Saint Nicholas of Mozhaisk was installed on the wall of Nikolskaya Tower above the Nikolsky Gate to Moscow Kremlin. The icon is dated to the end of 15th - beginning of 16th century.

The Tower was exploded by retreating French during the French invasion of Russia in 1812. The top of the tower was completely destroyed but the icon was damaged only slightly.

The icon was again damaged by artillery fire during the October Revolution in 1917. The gunshots destroyed the left hand (with the Mozhaisk cathedral) of the saint but the right hand with the sword was left intact. After this the icons of "Wounded Saint Nicholas of Mozhaisk" appeared holding the sword with the right hand but with the left hand and the cathedral missing.

During the Soviet rule the icon was plastered over. It was uncovered and restored in 2010.

== In popular culture ==
Mikola Mozhaiski is a character in the 1999 novel Enchantment by Orson Scott Card.

== Gallery ==
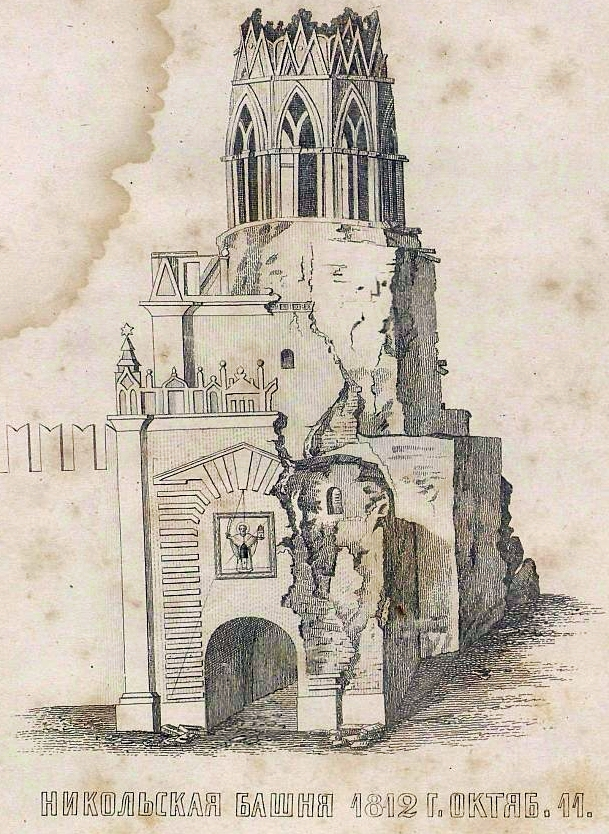
Nikolskaya Tower after French retreat, the top of the tower was destroyed but the icon survived

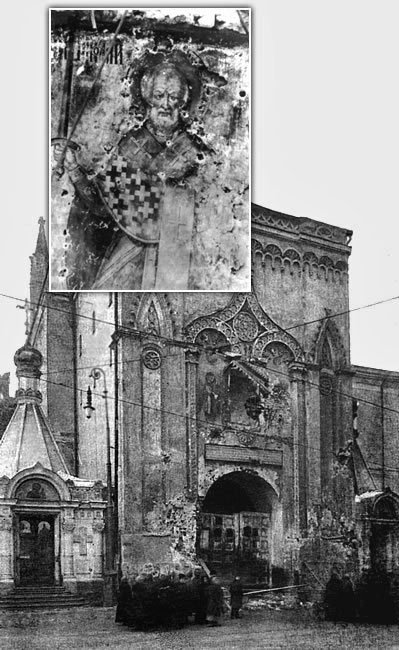
Kremlin icon of Saint Nicholas of Mozhaisk after the October Revolution in 1917

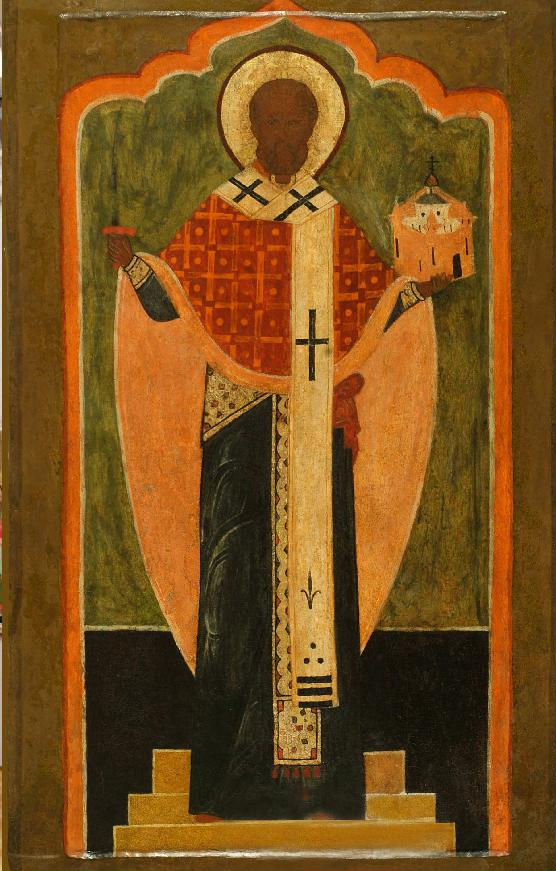
Icon of Saint Nicholas of Mozhaisk, 16th-17th century

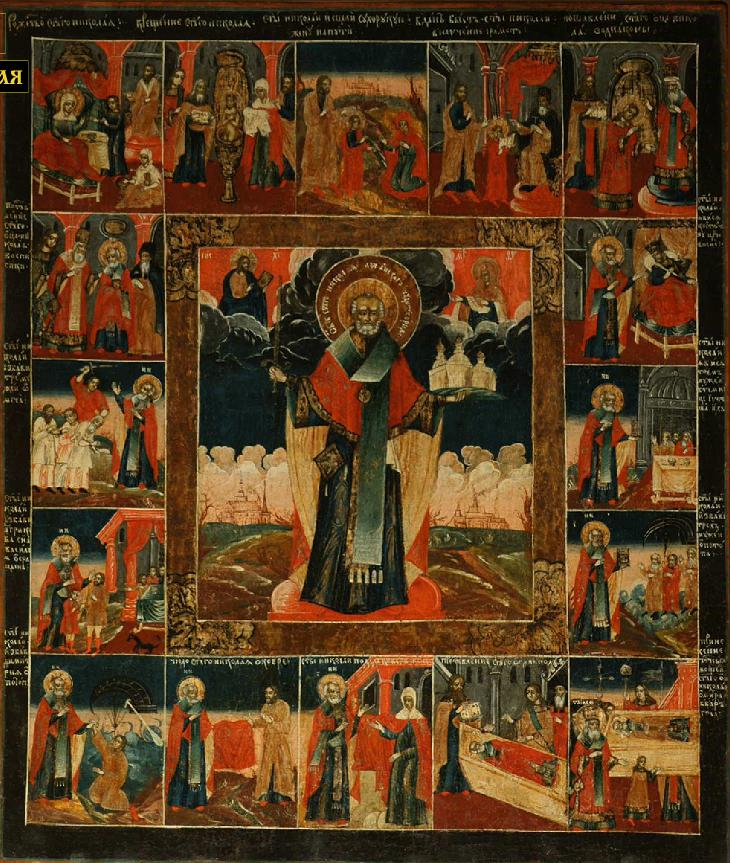
Icon "Saint Nicholas of Mozhaisk and his Life"

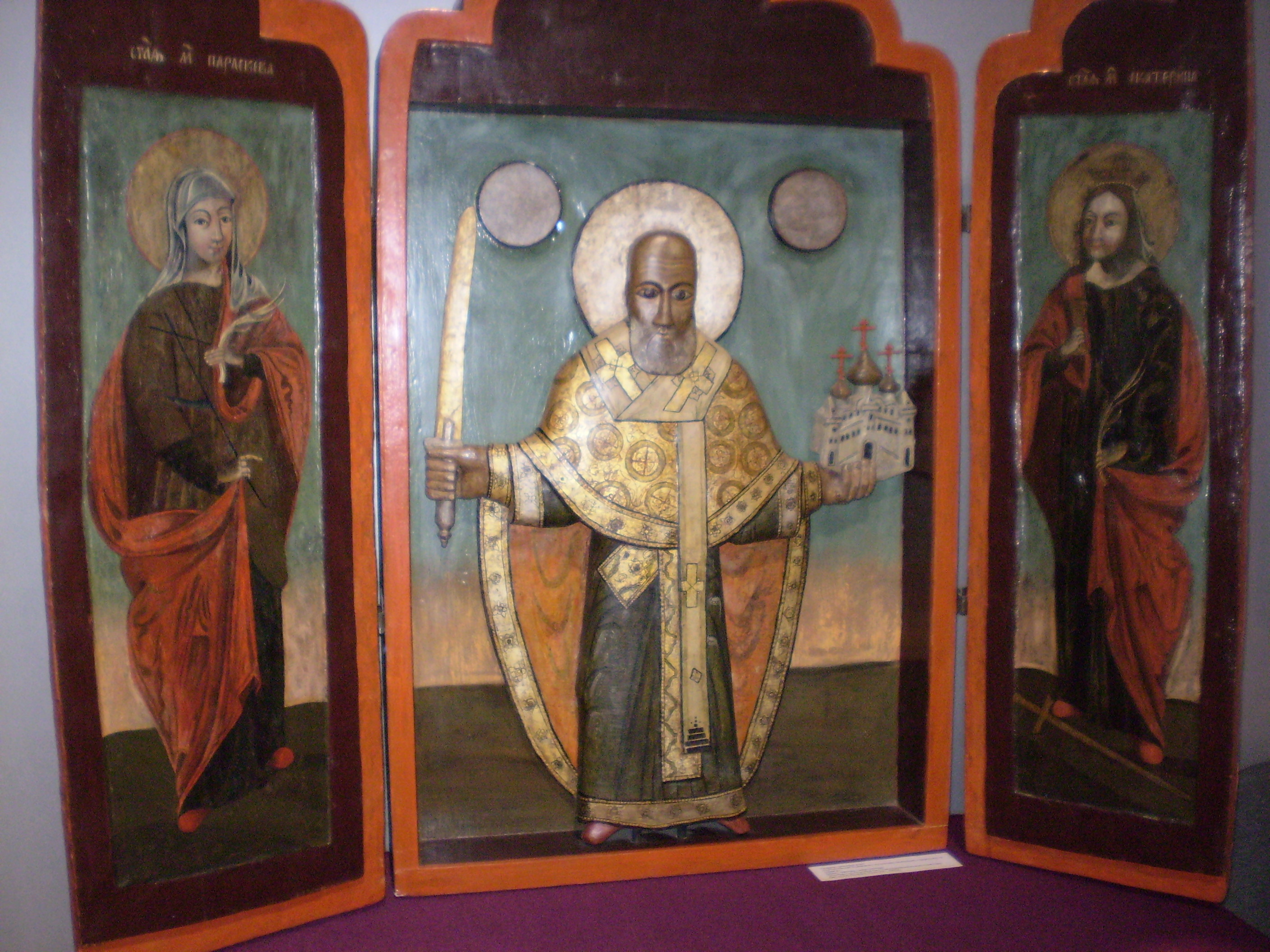
Saint Nicholas of Mozhaisk with Saint martyrs Catherine and Paraskevi

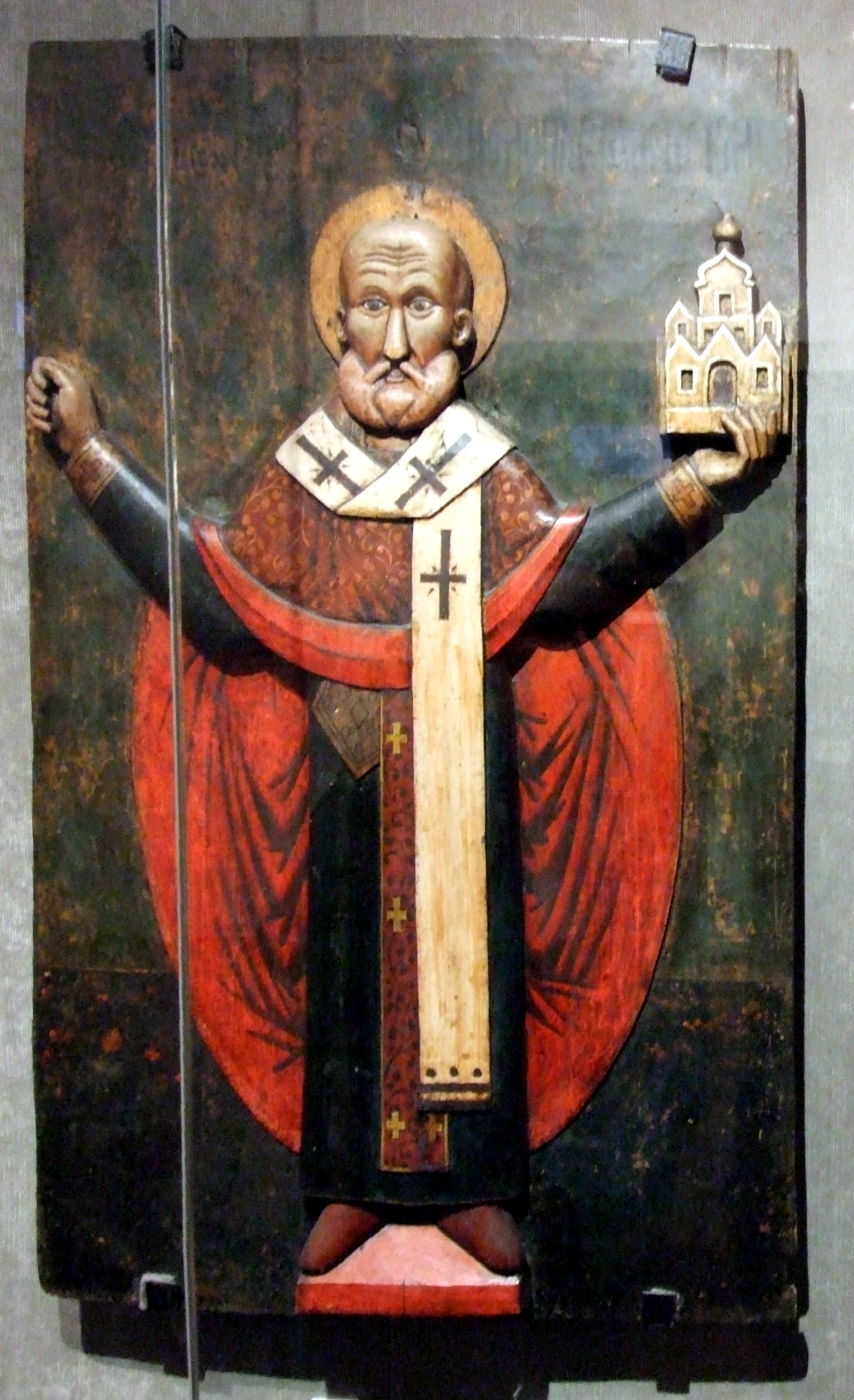
Saint Nicholas of Mozhaisk, 17th century

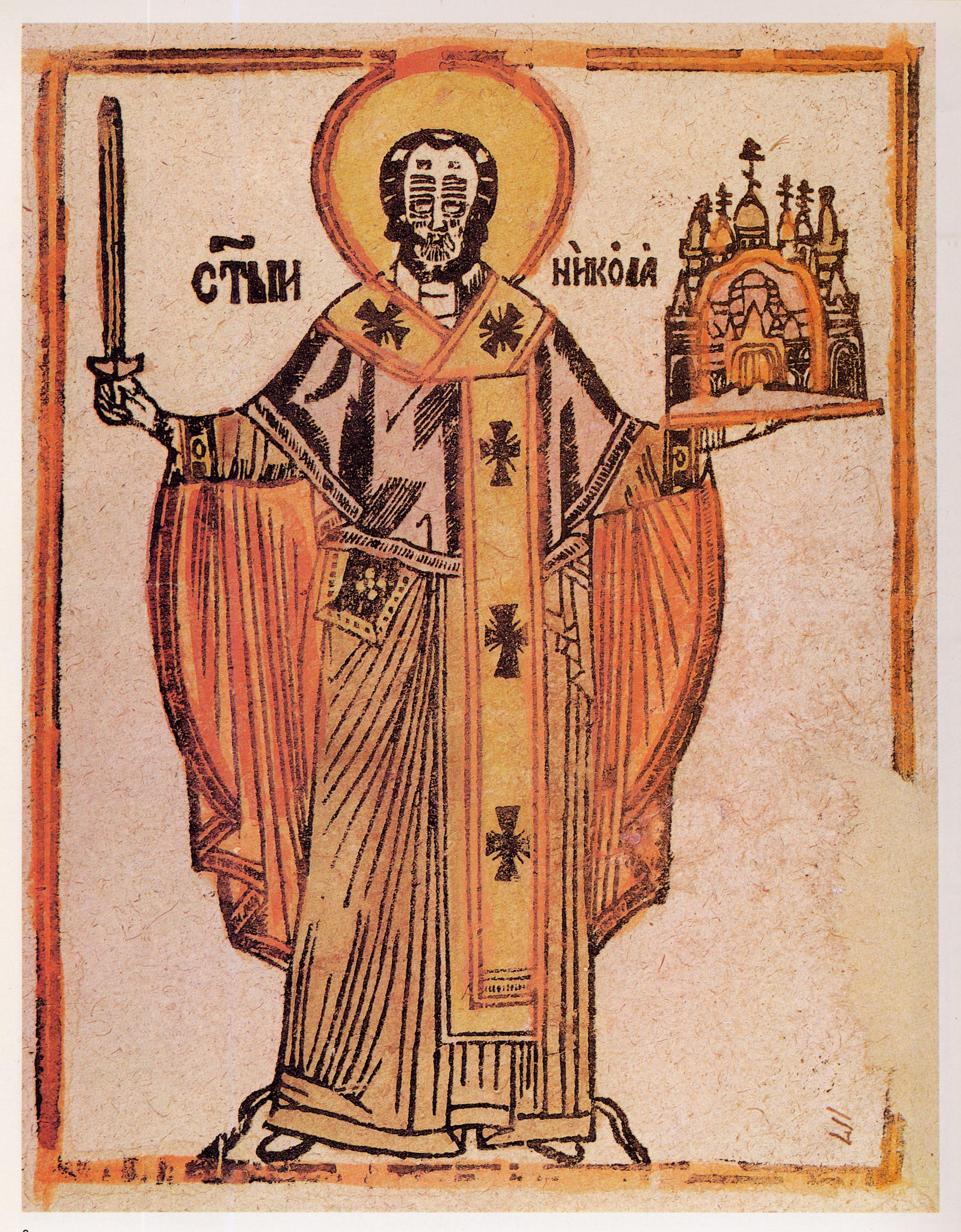
Saint Nicholas of Mozhaisk, lubok

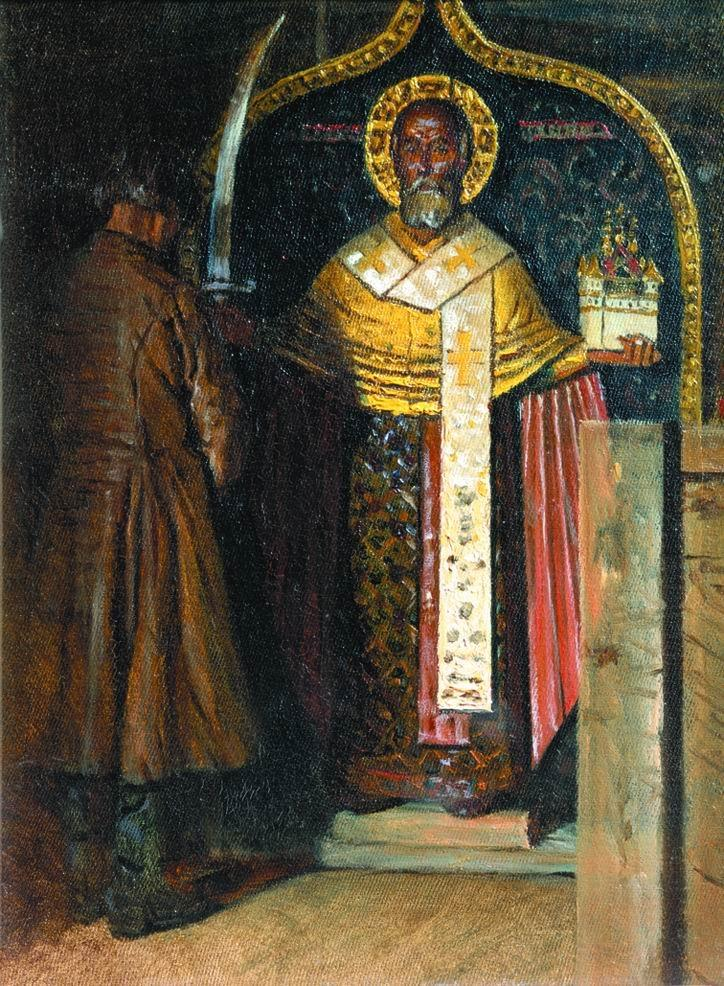
Icon of Saint Nicholas of Mozhaisk, 1894
