= Ferapontov Monastery =

Orthodox monastery in Ferapontovo, Russia

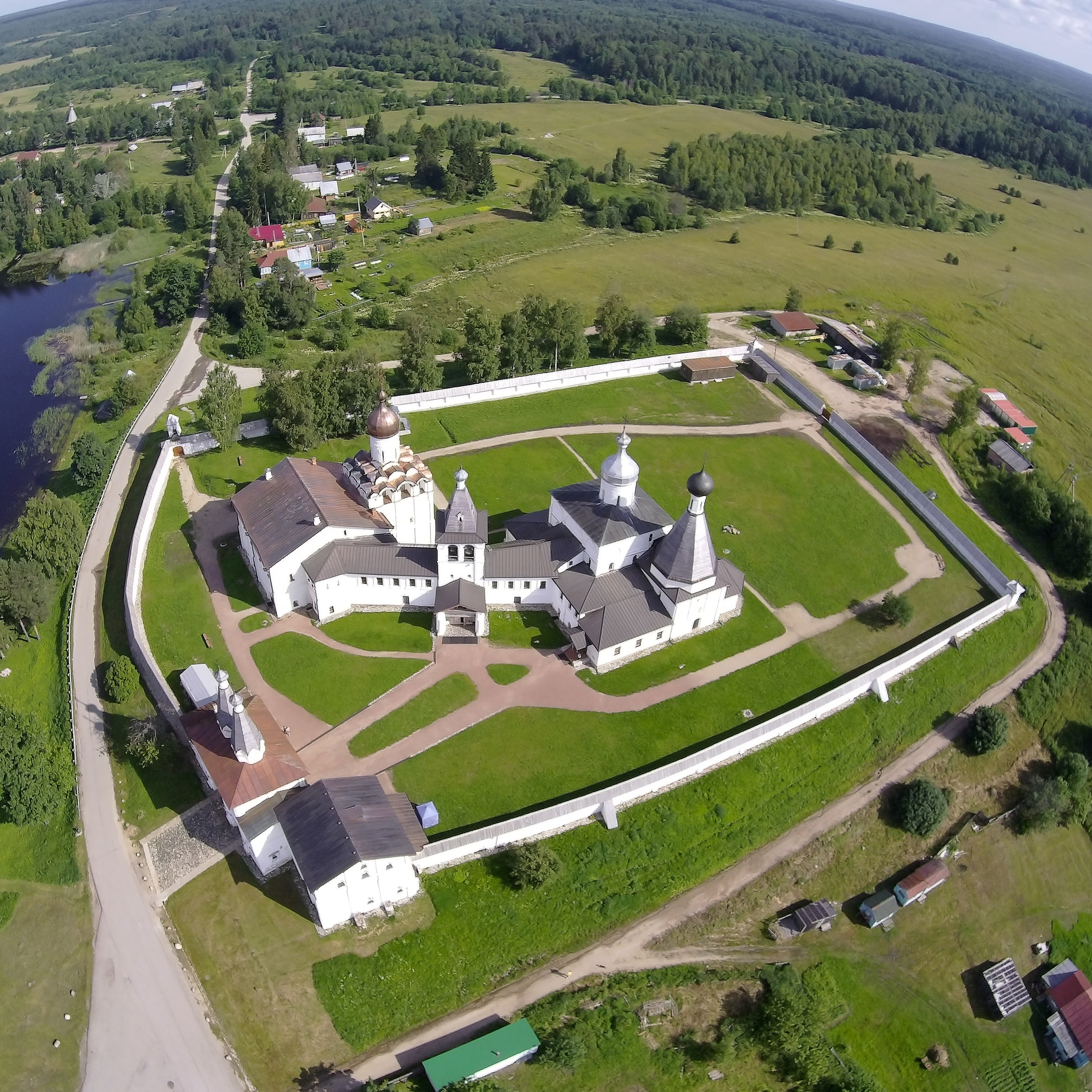
- Interactive map of Ferapontov Monastery

Monastery information
- Order: Russian Orthodox Church
- Established: 1398
- Disestablished: 1924

People
- Founder: Saint Ferapont

Site
- Location: Ferapontovo, Vologda Oblast, Russia
- Location within European Russia Location within Europe

UNESCO World Heritage Site
- Official name: Ensemble of the Ferapontov Monastery
- Criteria: Cultural: (i), (iv)
- Reference: 982
- Inscription: 2000 (24th Session)
- Area: 2.1 ha (230,000 sq ft)
- Buffer zone: 20 ha (2,200,000 sq ft)
- Coordinates: 59°57′23″N 38°34′03″E

The Ferapontov Monastery is a monastery of the Russian Orthodox Church in Ferapontovo, Kirillovsky District, Vologda Oblast, Russia. The monastery was founded by Saint Ferapont in 1398. In 2000, the monastery was added to the UNESCO list of World Heritage Sites.

== History ==
The monastery was founded by Saint Ferapont in 1398 in the Russian North, to the east from the Kirillo-Belozersky Monastery, named after his fellow monk, Saint Cyril of Beloozero. The fame of the monastery started to spread under Kirill's disciple, Saint Martinian, who was to become a father superior of the Troitse-Sergiyeva Lavra in 1447.

Even after Martinian's death, his monastery was protected and favoured by members of Ivan III's family. The most ancient structure, the Cathedral of Nativity of the Virgin (1490), was built in brick by the masters of Rostov. This edifice is the best preserved of three sister cathedrals erected in the 1490s in the Russian North. All the interior walls are covered with invaluable frescoes by the great medieval painter Dionisius. This is the last surviving Russian medieval church with fully painted walls.

During the 1530s, they added a treasury, a refectory, and the unique Annunciation church surmounted by a belfry. At that time the monastery enjoyed special privileges conferred upon it by Ivan the Terrible, and possessed some 60 villages in the vicinity. The tsar himself frequently visited the monastery as a pilgrim.

In the Time of Troubles, the monastery was ravaged by the Poles. During its recovery the last buildings — the tent-like church of Saint Martinian (1641), a two-tented barbican church (1650), and a bell-tower (1680) — were added to the complex. The belfry clocks (1638) are said to be the oldest in Russia.

As the monastery gradually lost its religious importance, it was being turned into a place of exile for distinguished clerics, such as the Patriarch Nikon. It was abolished by Emperor Paul in 1798, reinstituted as a convent in 1904, closed by the Bolsheviks 20 years later, and turned into a museum in 1975. The museum constitutes a part of the Russky Sever (Russian North) National Park since 1991.

As of January 2013, images of the monastery and grounds were available via Google Street View.

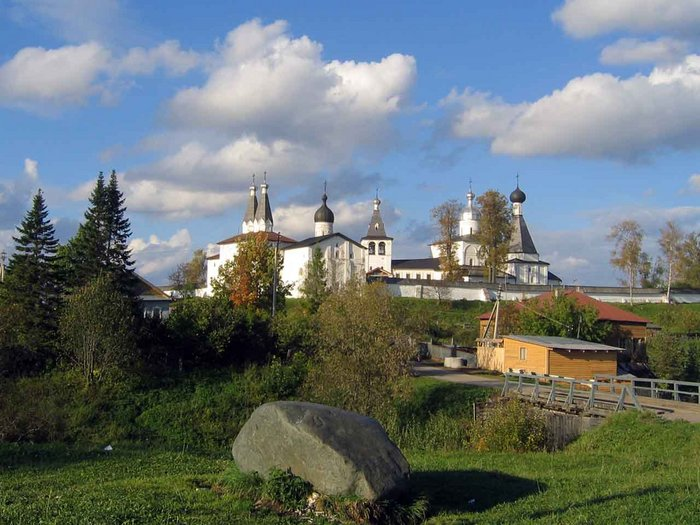
Difficulty of access helped preserve the monastery intact since the 17th century.

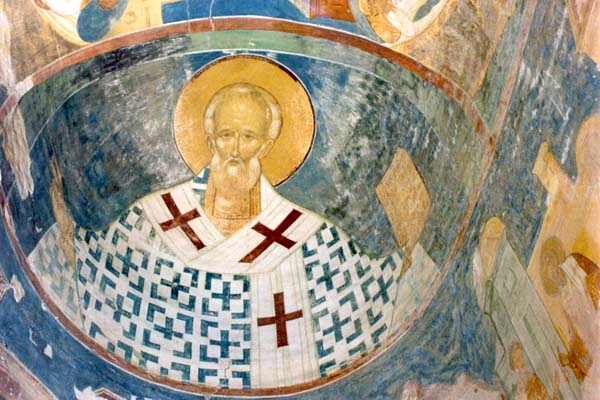
St Nicholas, the patron saint of Russian merchants. Fresco by Dionisius from the Ferapontov Monastery.
