= Sport in Finland =

Sporting activity in Finland

Sport is considered a national pastime in Finland and many Finns visit different sporting events regularly. Pesäpallo is the national sport of Finland, although the most popular forms of sport in terms of television viewers and media coverage are ice hockey and Formula One. In spectator attendance, harness racing comes right after ice hockey in popularity.

Other popular sports include floorball, bandy, football, ringette, and Pesäpallo.

== Popular sports in Finland ==
=== Ice hockey ===
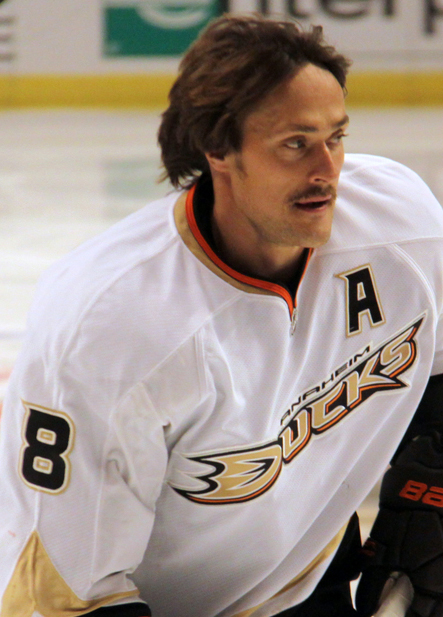
Teemu Selänne is the greatest Finnish goal scorer in history in the NHL's regular season. The Finnish discus audience has also voted him the all-time Finnish player.

Ice hockey is the most popular sport in Finland. The Finnish main league Liiga has an attendance average of 4,850 people. Ice Hockey World Championships 2016 final Finland-Canada, 69% of Finnish people watched that game on TV MTV3-channel. The Finnish national team has won the World Championship five times, in 1995, 2011, 2019, 2022, 2026 and is considered a member of the so-called "Big Six", the unofficial group of the six strongest men's ice hockey nations, along with Canada, Czechia, Russia, Sweden and the United States. At the 2022 Winter Olympics, the Finnish hockey team won the Men's tournament Olympic gold for the first time. Some of the most notable Finnish players are Teemu Selänne, Jari Kurri, Jere Lehtinen, Teppo Numminen, Tuukka Rask and brothers Saku and Mikko Koivu. Finland has hosted the Men's Ice Hockey World Championships in 1965, 1974, 1982, 1991, 1997, 2003, 2022 and co-hosted 2012 - 2013 and 2023.

Year	Location	Result
1995	Stockholm / Gävle Sweden	Gold
2011	Bratislava / Košice Slovakia	Gold
2019	Bratislava / Košice Slovakia	Gold
2022	Tampere / Helsinki Finland	Gold
2026	Zurich / Fribourg Switzerland	Gold

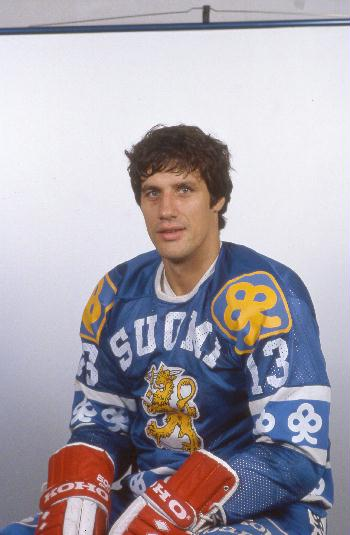
Veli-Pekka Ketola

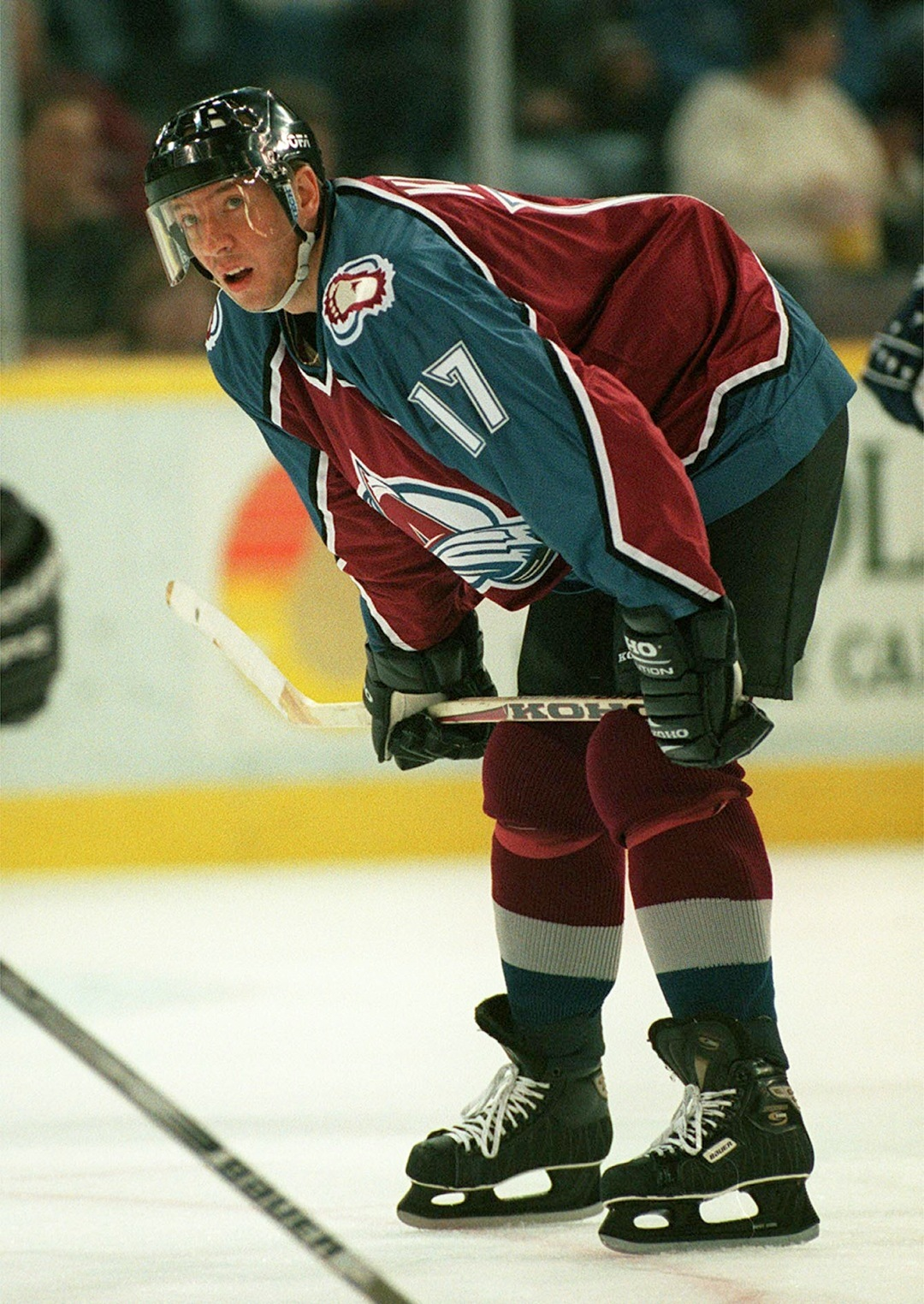
Jari Kurri

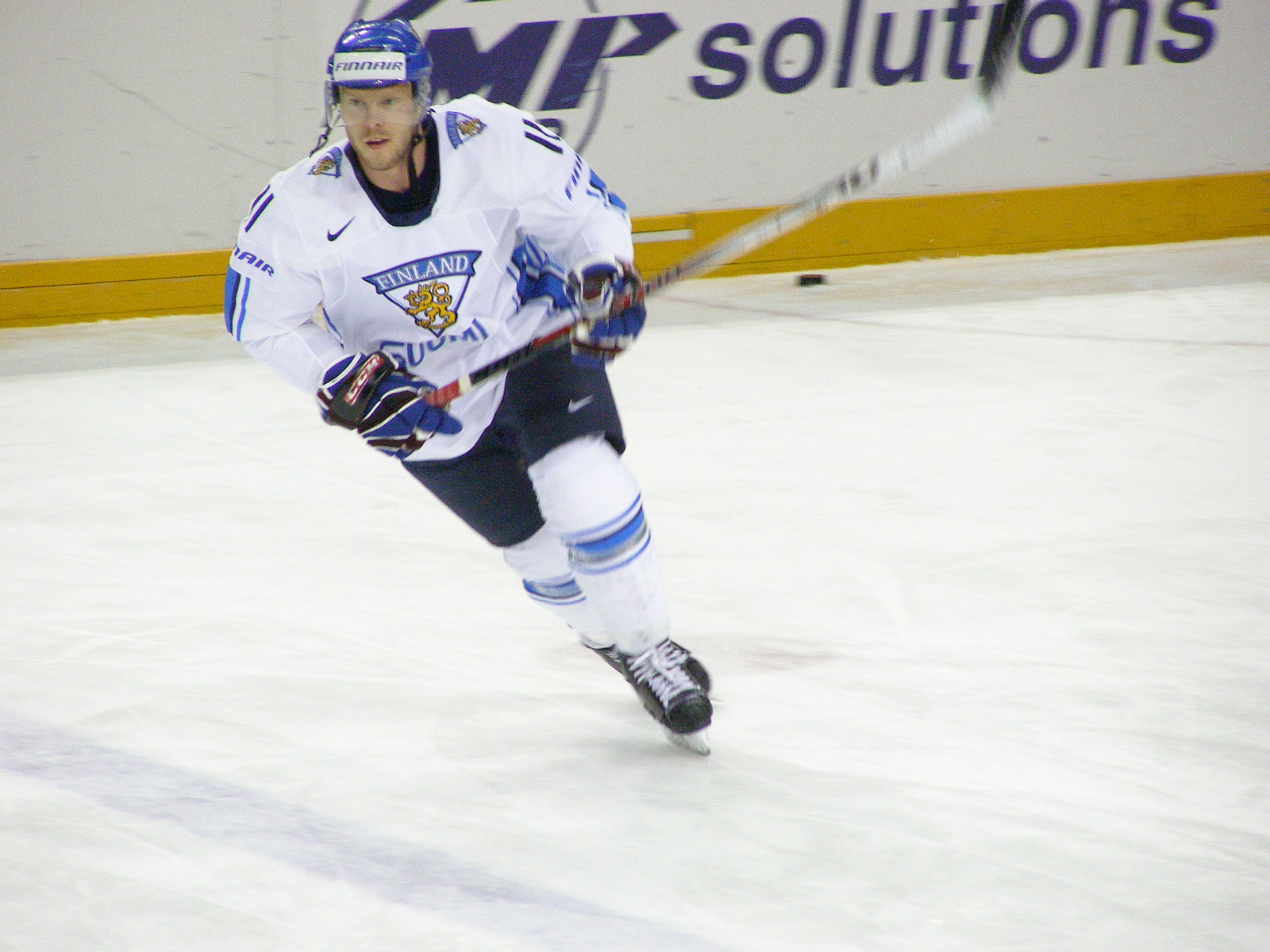
Saku Koivu

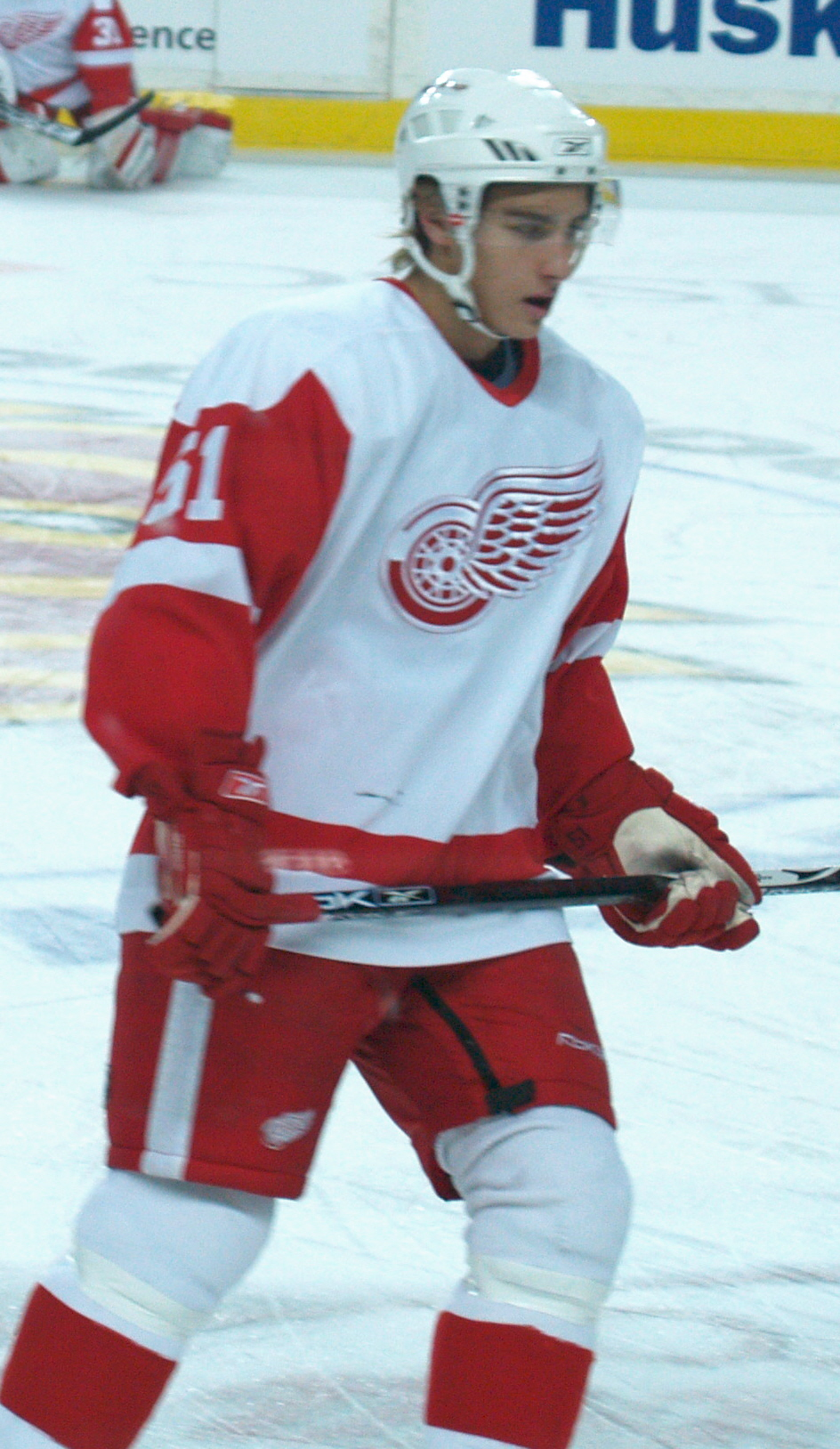
Valtteri Filppula

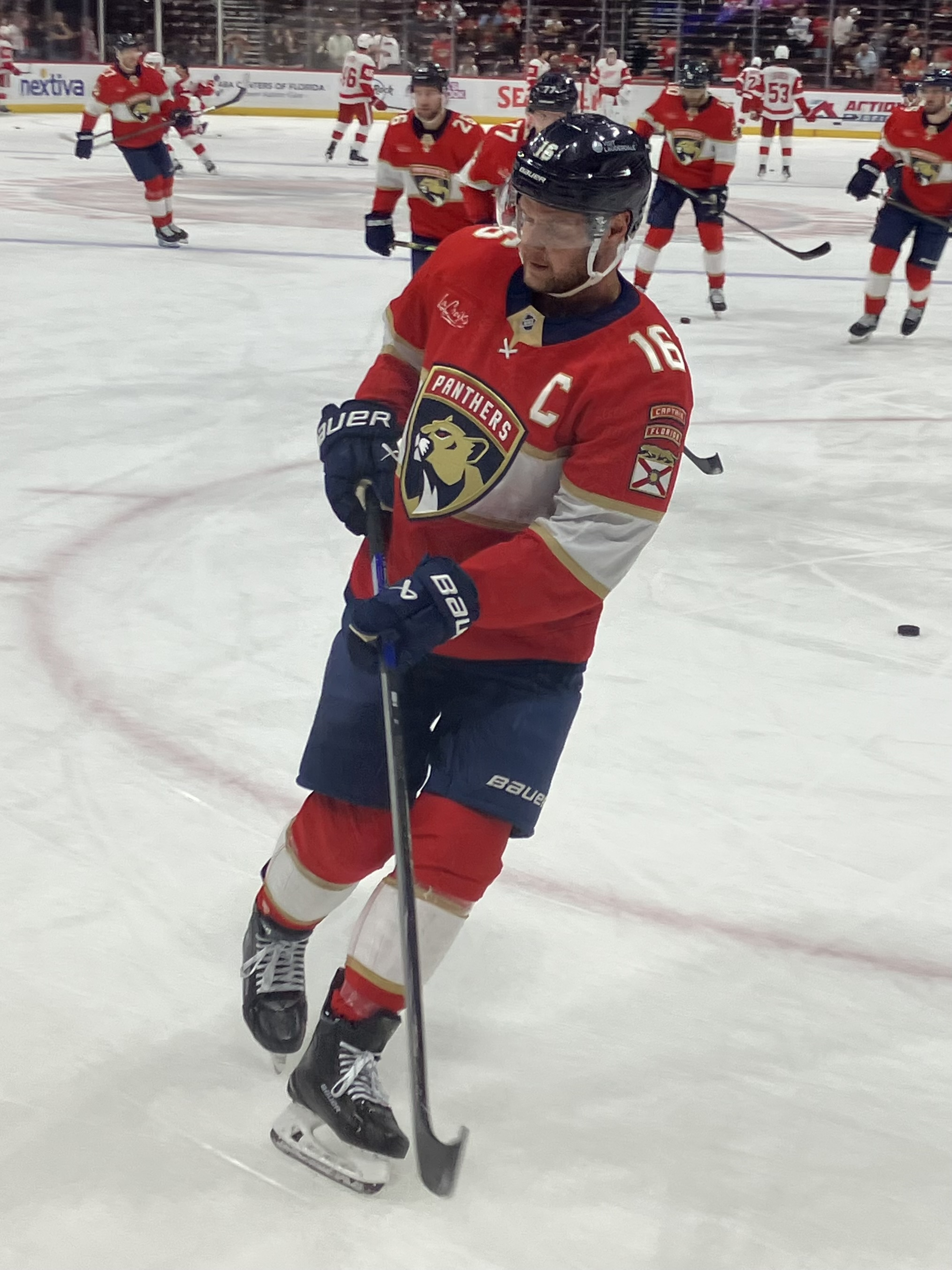
Aleksander Barkov

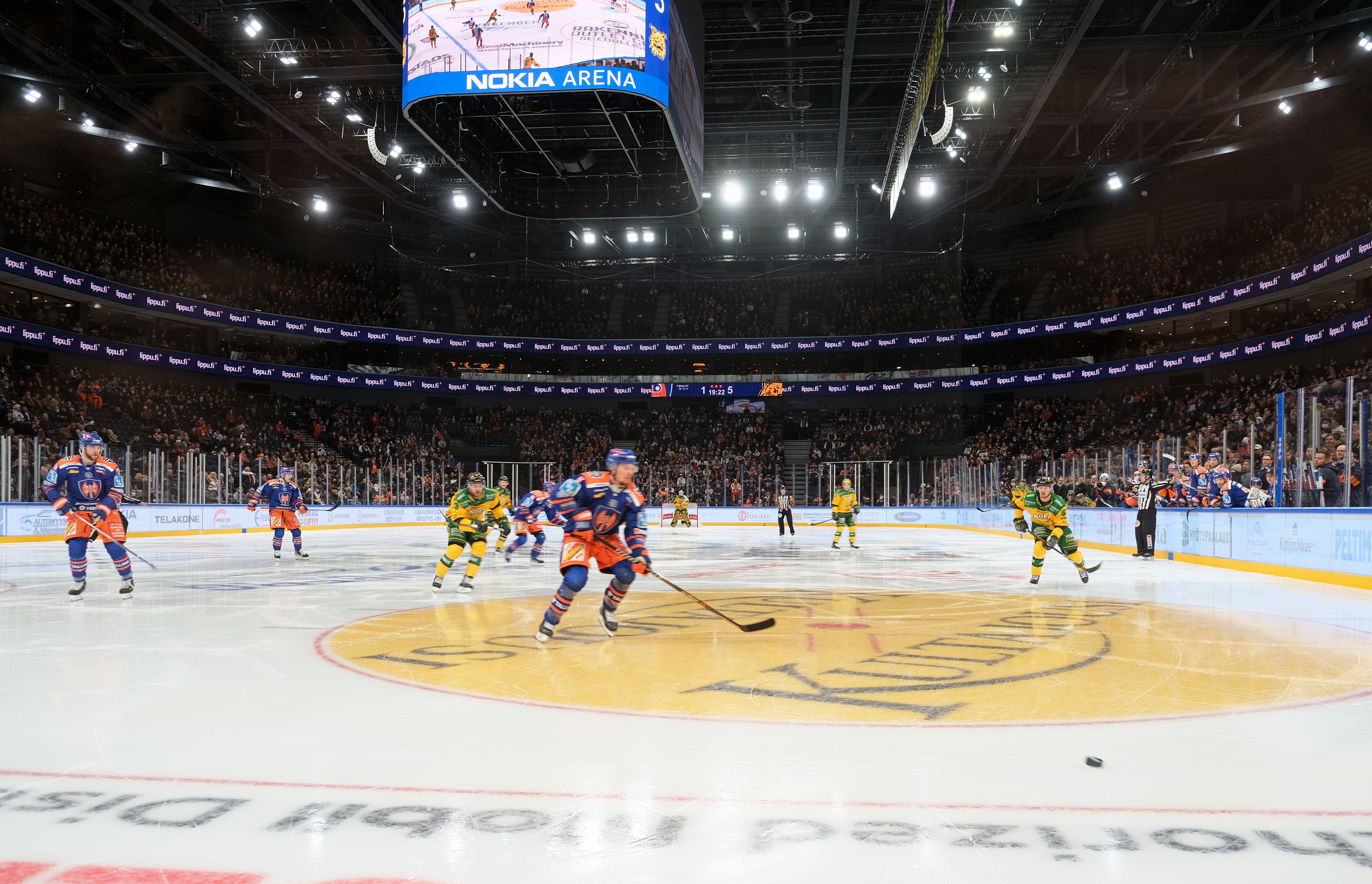
Finnish SM-Liiga game, Tappara vs Ilves

=== Football ===
Football in Finland, unlike in most European countries, is not the most popular spectator sport, as it falls behind ice hockey, which enjoys a huge amount of popularity in the country. Football tops ice hockey in the number of registered players (115,000 vs. 60,000) and as a popular hobby (160,000 vs. 90,000 in adults and 230,000 vs. 105,000 in youth). It is the most popular hobby among 3- to 18-year-olds, whereas ice hockey is 9th. Football's standing is constantly increasing, where the yearly growth rate has lately been over 10 percent. In season 2006–07 19.9 percent of registered players were female. The Football Association of Finland (Palloliitto) has approximately a thousand clubs as its members. According to a Gallup poll, nearly 400,000 people include football in their hobbies.

HJK is the most successful Finnish football club and has won 32 Finnish championship. It is also the only Finnish club that has played in the UEFA Champions League and Europa League in group stage.

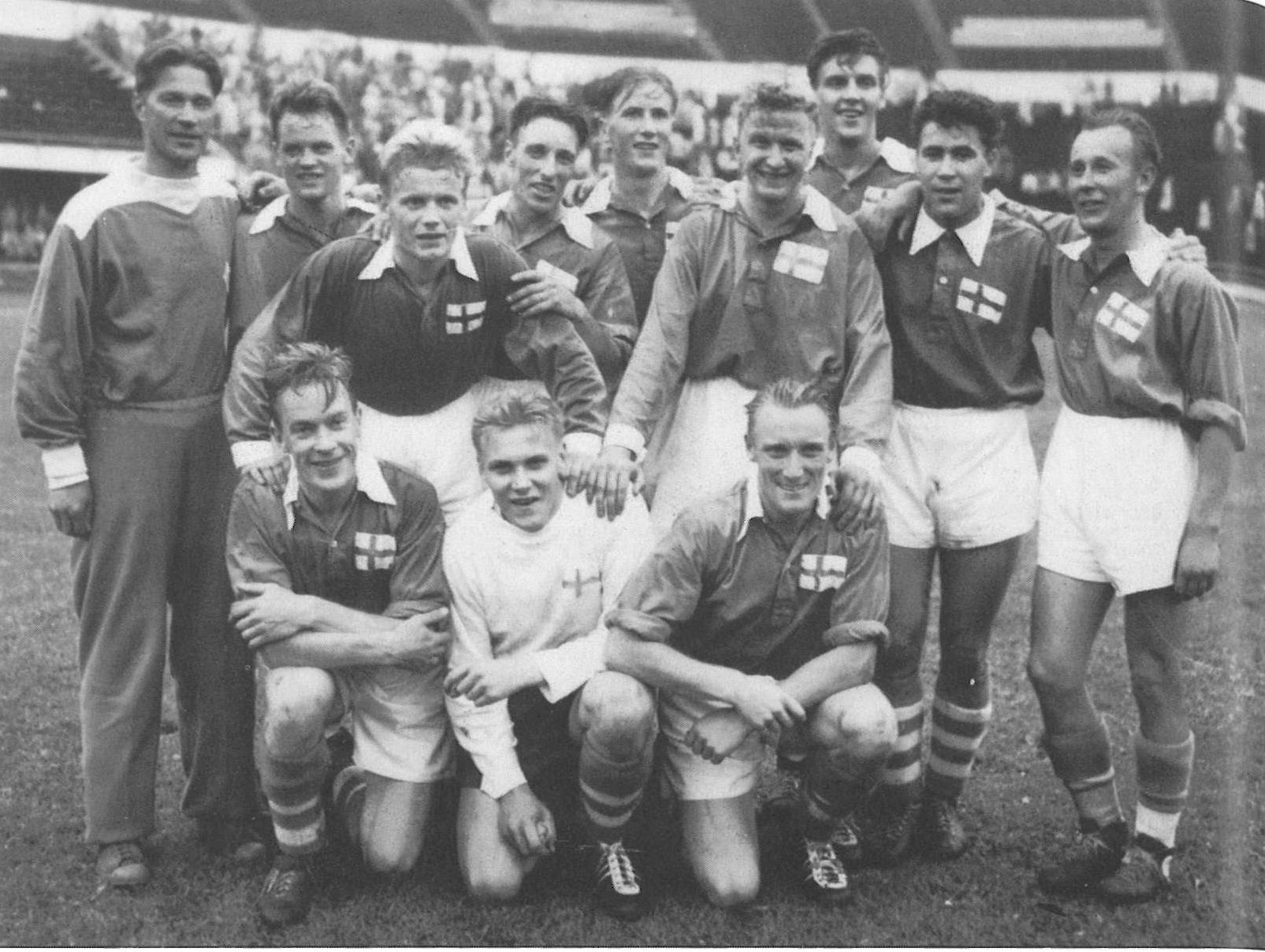
Finland football team (1953)

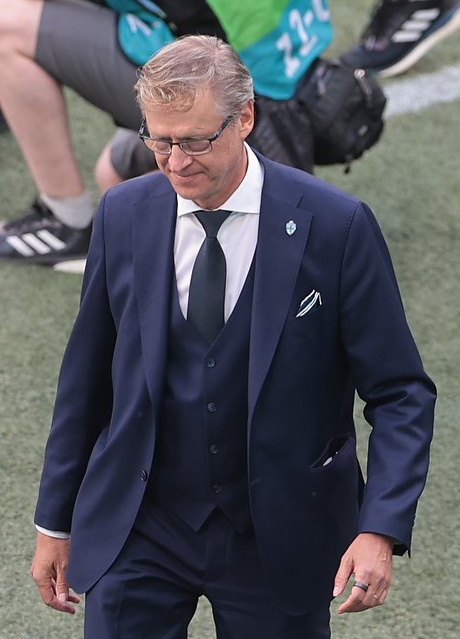
Markku Kanerva

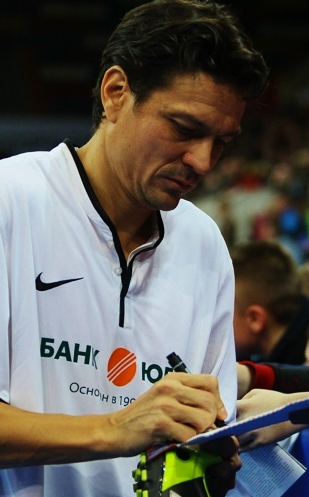
Jari Litmanen

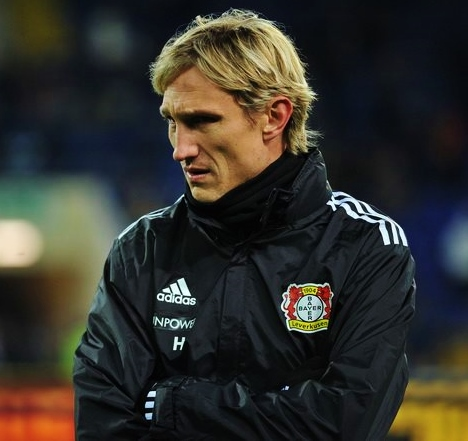
Sami Hyypiä

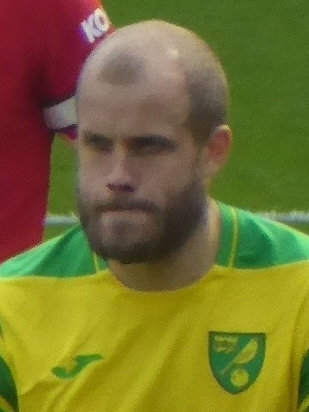
Teemu Pukki

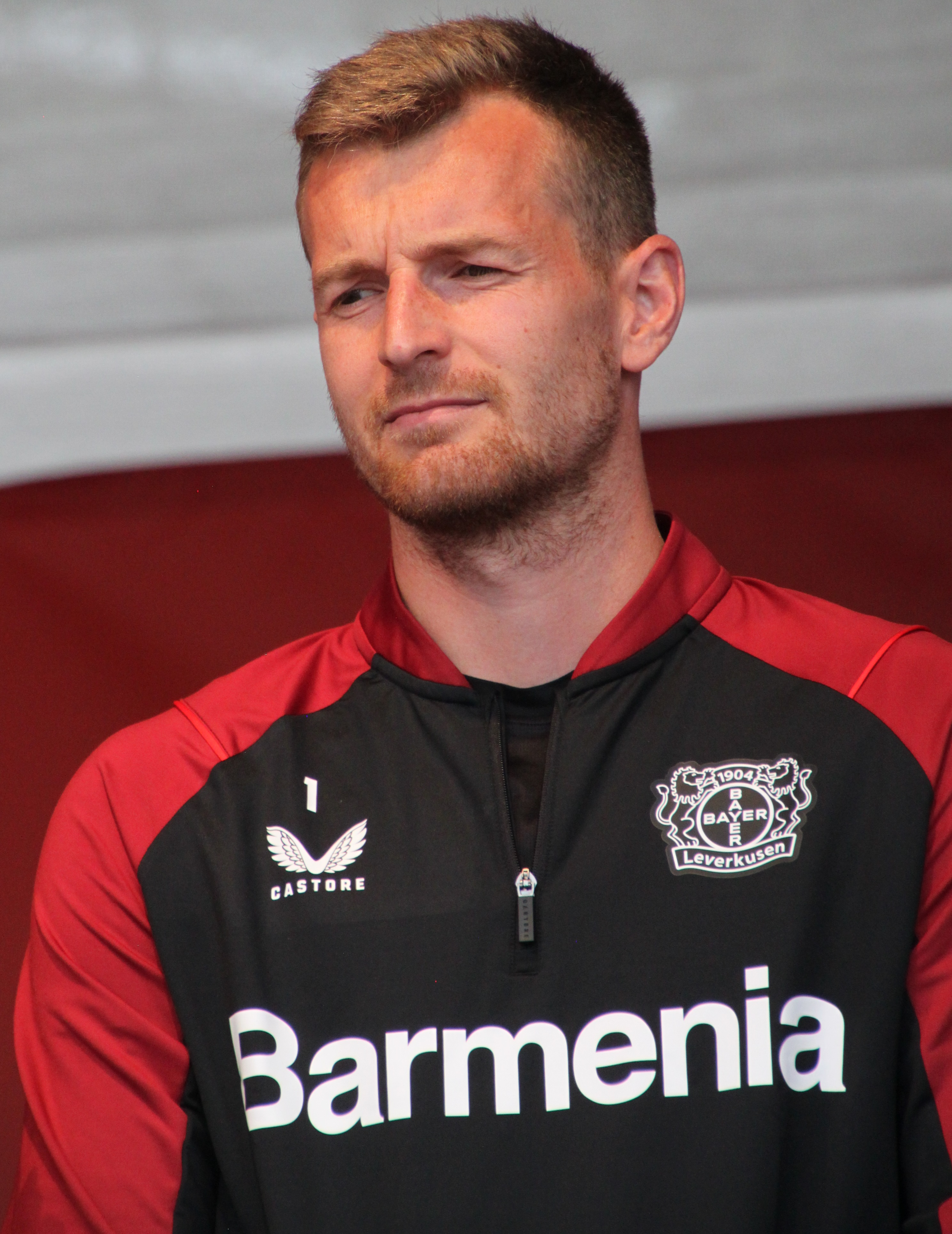
Lukáš Hrádecký

=== Floorball ===
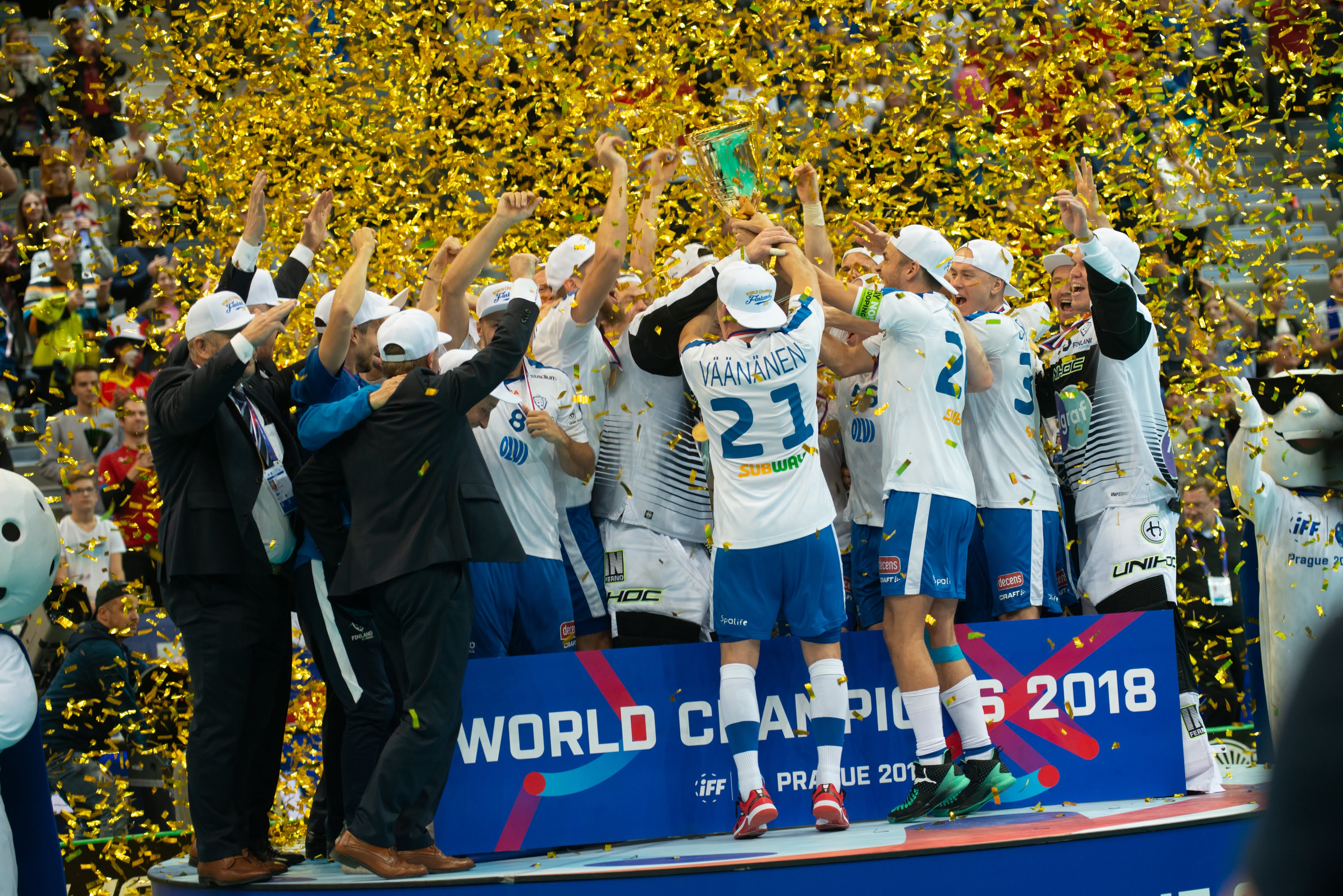
The Finnish men celebrating having become the 2018 world champions

Floorball is a popular sport and Finland was one of the three founding countries of International Floorball Federation. Finland men's national floorball team has won the World Floorball Championships in 2008, 2010, 2016, 2018 and 2024, making floorball the only team sport in which Finland has defended a World Championship title, and placed second in 1996, 2000, 2002, 2006, 2012, 2014 and 2020.

Finland has hosted Men's World Floorball Championships in 2002 and 2010 and will host it again in 2020. The game is played similar to floor hockey, with five players and a goal keeper on each team. The game is played indoors for men and woman, using 95 to 115.5 cm. sticks, and a plastic ball. The length of the game is three twenty minute periods.

=== Motorsport ===
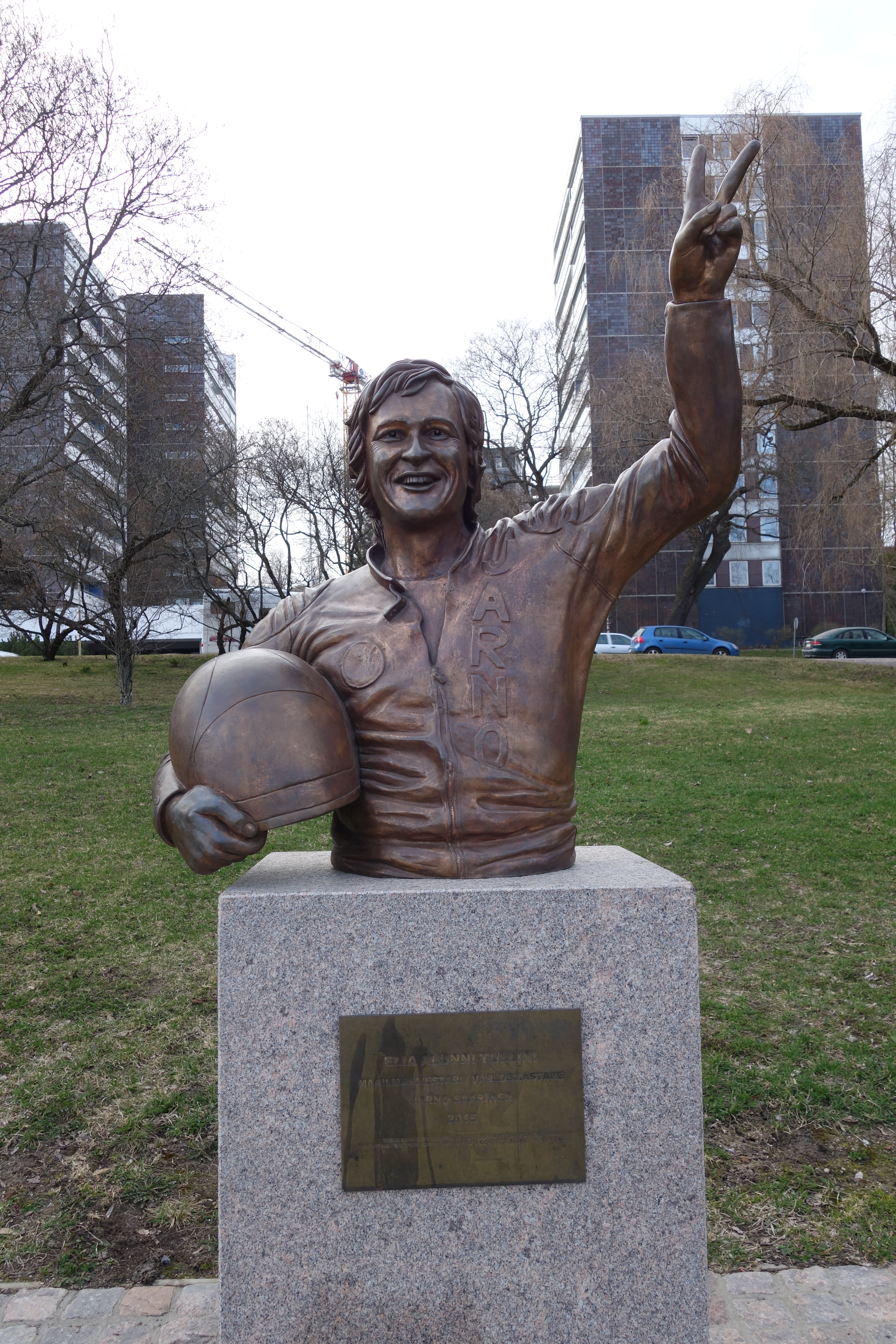
Jarno Saarinen, famous motorcycle rider born in Turku. The statue is located in Turku's Aurajoki Beach, Barker Park

Motorsport became popular in Finland in the 1950s with the birth of rallying competitions. In the 1960s Finnish rally drivers such as Rauno Aaltonen, Timo Mäkinen and Pauli Toivonen started to dominate international events and have held the post since, making Finland the most successful nation in the World Rally Championship. Juha Kankkunen and Tommi Mäkinen both won the World Championship four times during their respective careers and Marcus Grönholm won the title twice in 2000 and 2002. After 20 years later Kalle Rovanperä won the World Championship in 2022. Finland's WRC event, Neste Oil Rally Finland, gathers 500,000 spectators every year. The city of Jyväskylä in the Central Finland region has often served as the main venue for Finnish rally competitions.

Currently the most popular form of motorsport is Formula One. F1 was popularized in Finland in the 1980s by Keke Rosberg, who in 1982 became the first Finnish Formula One World Driver's champion, and reached its peak when Mika Häkkinen won the championship twice in 1998 and 1999. Kimi Räikkönen, the 2007 champion, has retired from the sport at the end of 2021. Since 2013, Valtteri Bottas has competed for the Williams F1, Mercedes, Alfa Romeo and Cadillac teams.

Other forms of motorsport popular in Finland include Grand Prix motorcycle racing, which reached its peak in the early 1970s before the death of Jarno Saarinen. In enduro, 7 and 13-time World Enduro Champions Kari Tiainen and Juha Salminen have ensured media coverage in their home country.

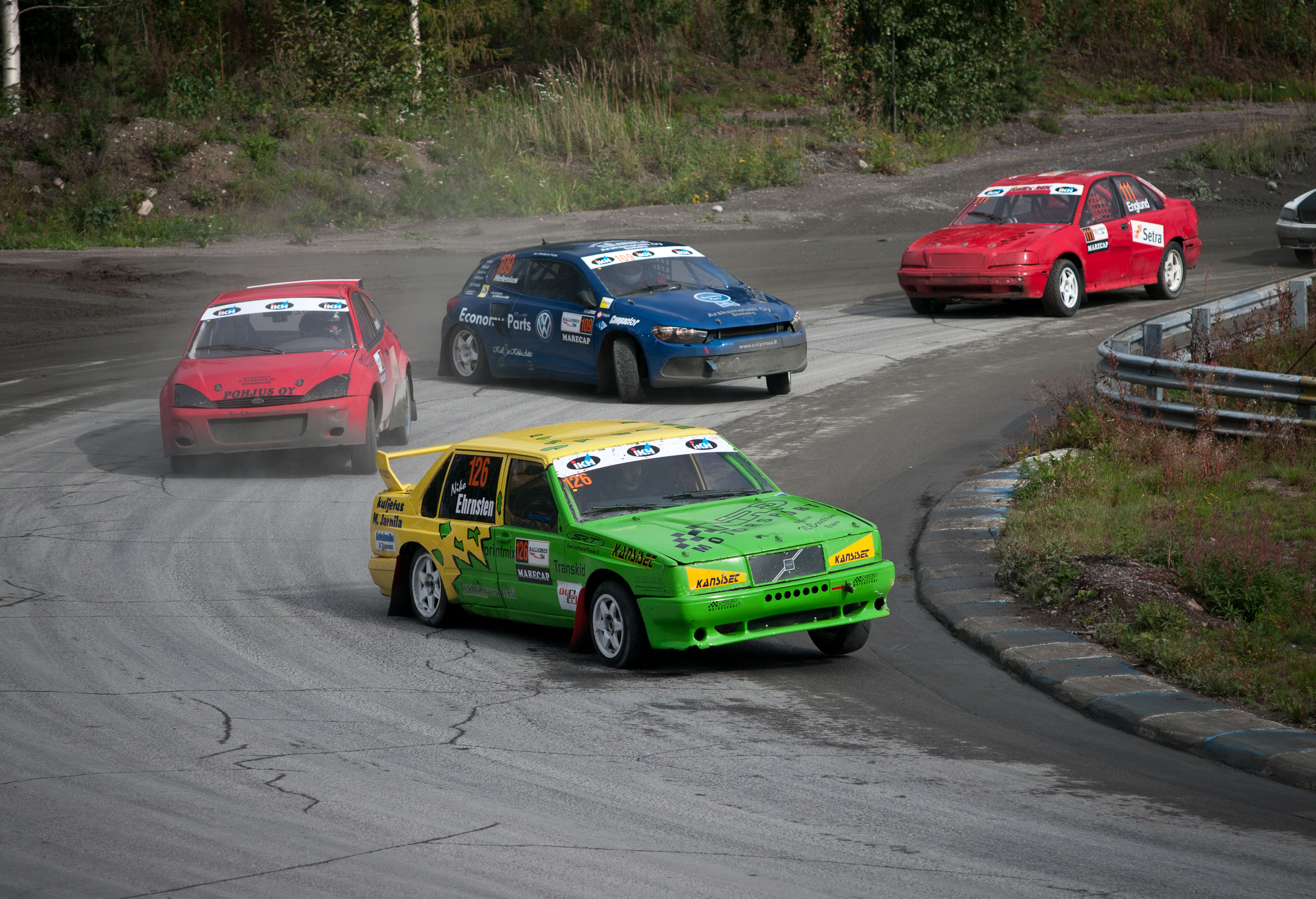
Folkrace and Rallycross

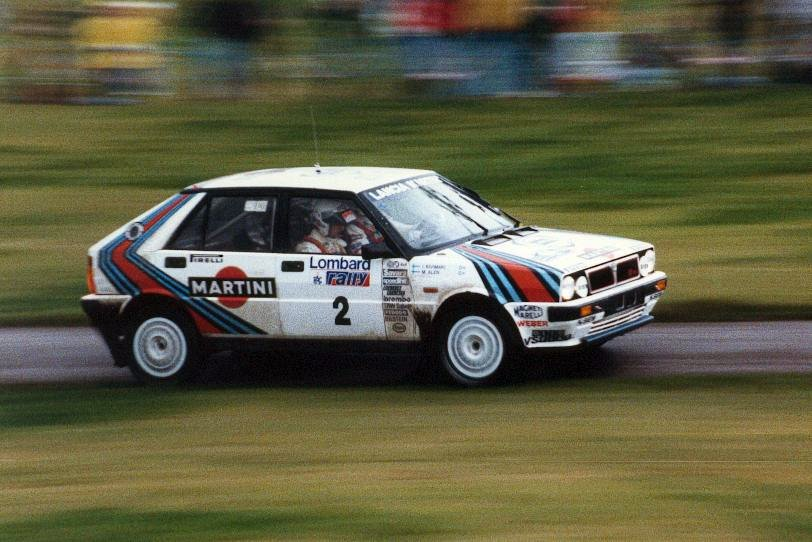
Markku Alén with his Lancia Delta at the 1987 WRC season

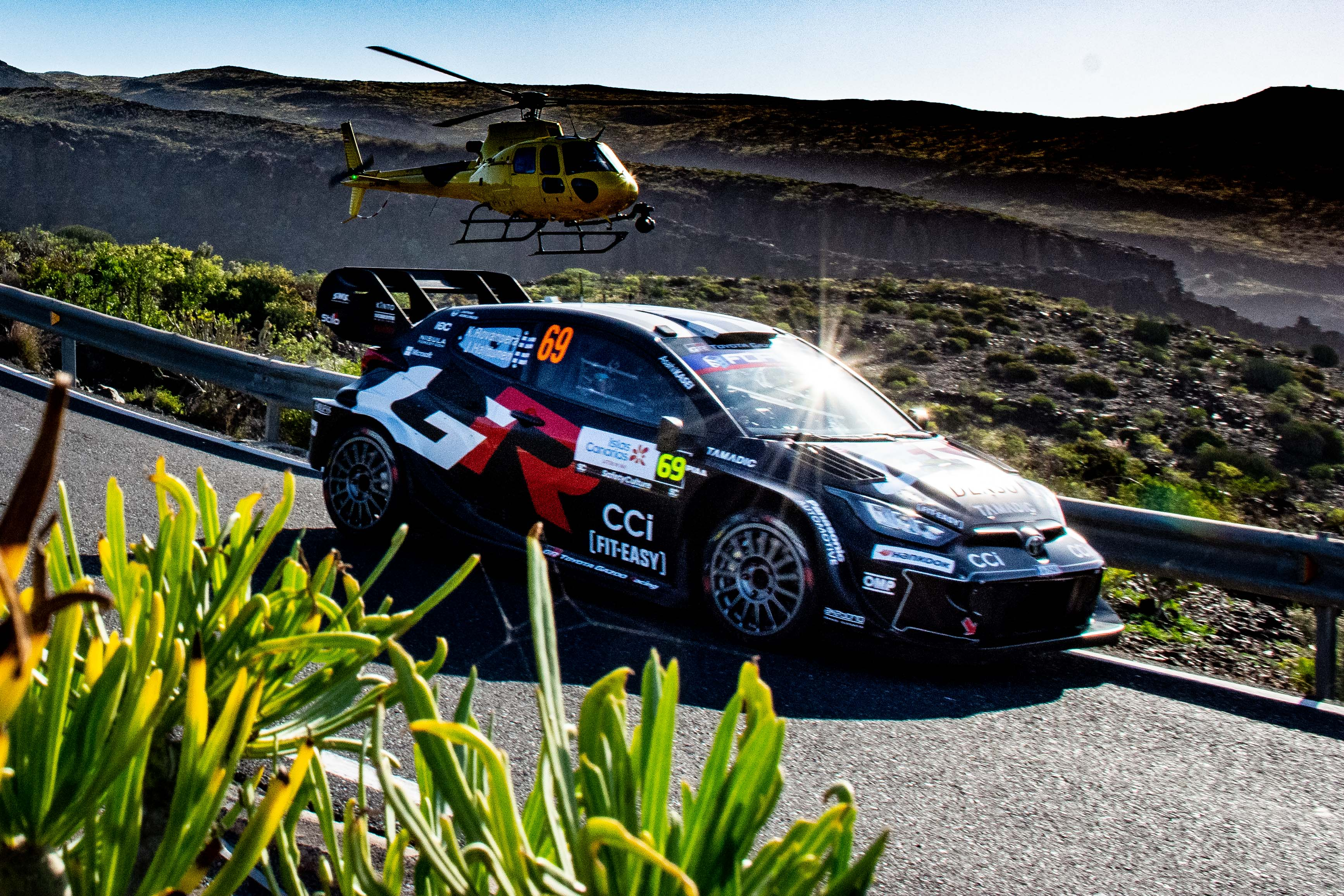
Kalle Rovanperä with his Toyota GR Yaris Rally1 at the 2025 WRC season

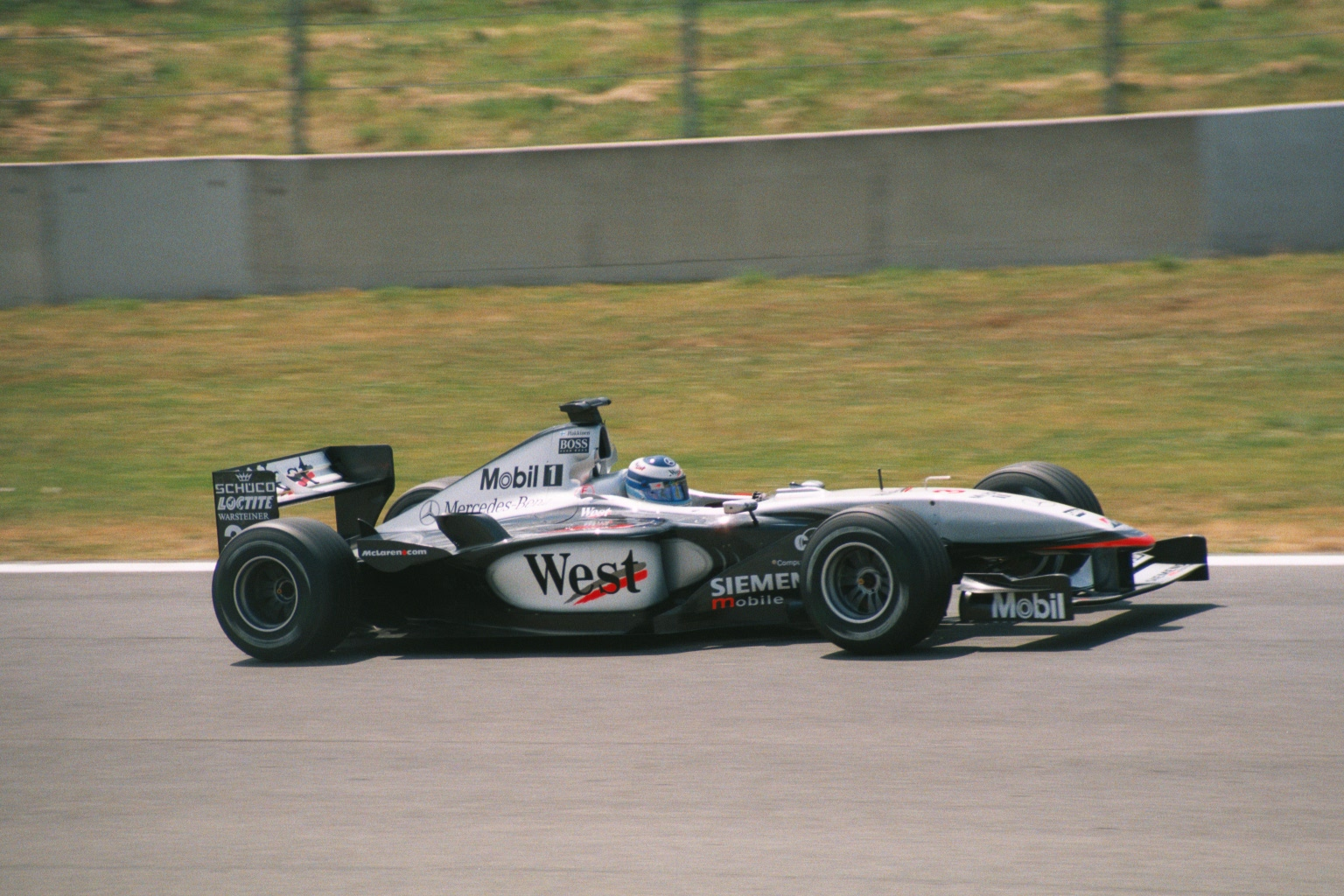
Mika Häkkinen driving for McLaren at the 2001 F1 season

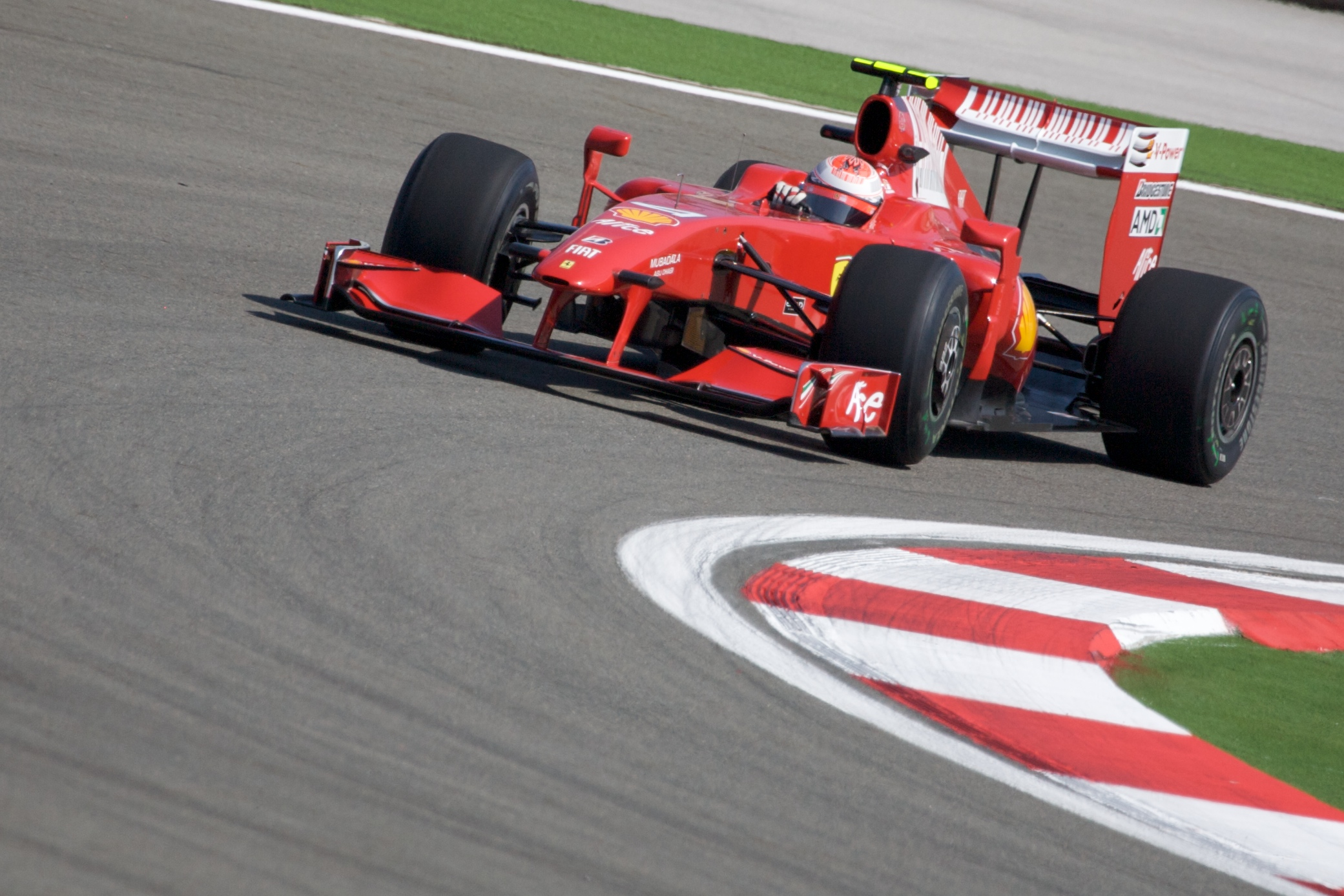
Kimi Räikkönen driving for Scuderia Ferrari at the 2009 F1 season

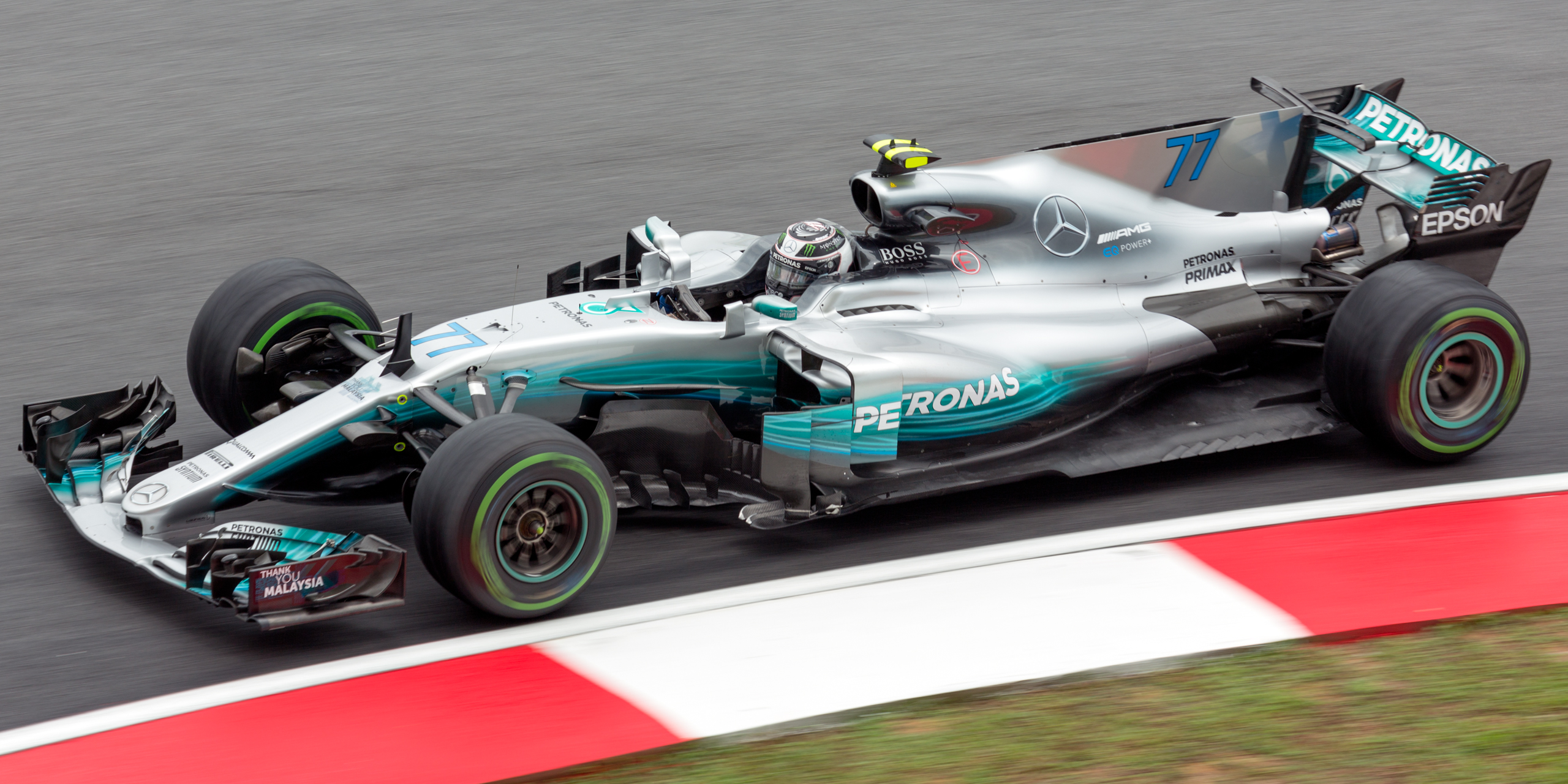
Bottas driving for Mercedes at the 2017 Malaysian Grand Prix

=== Bandy ===
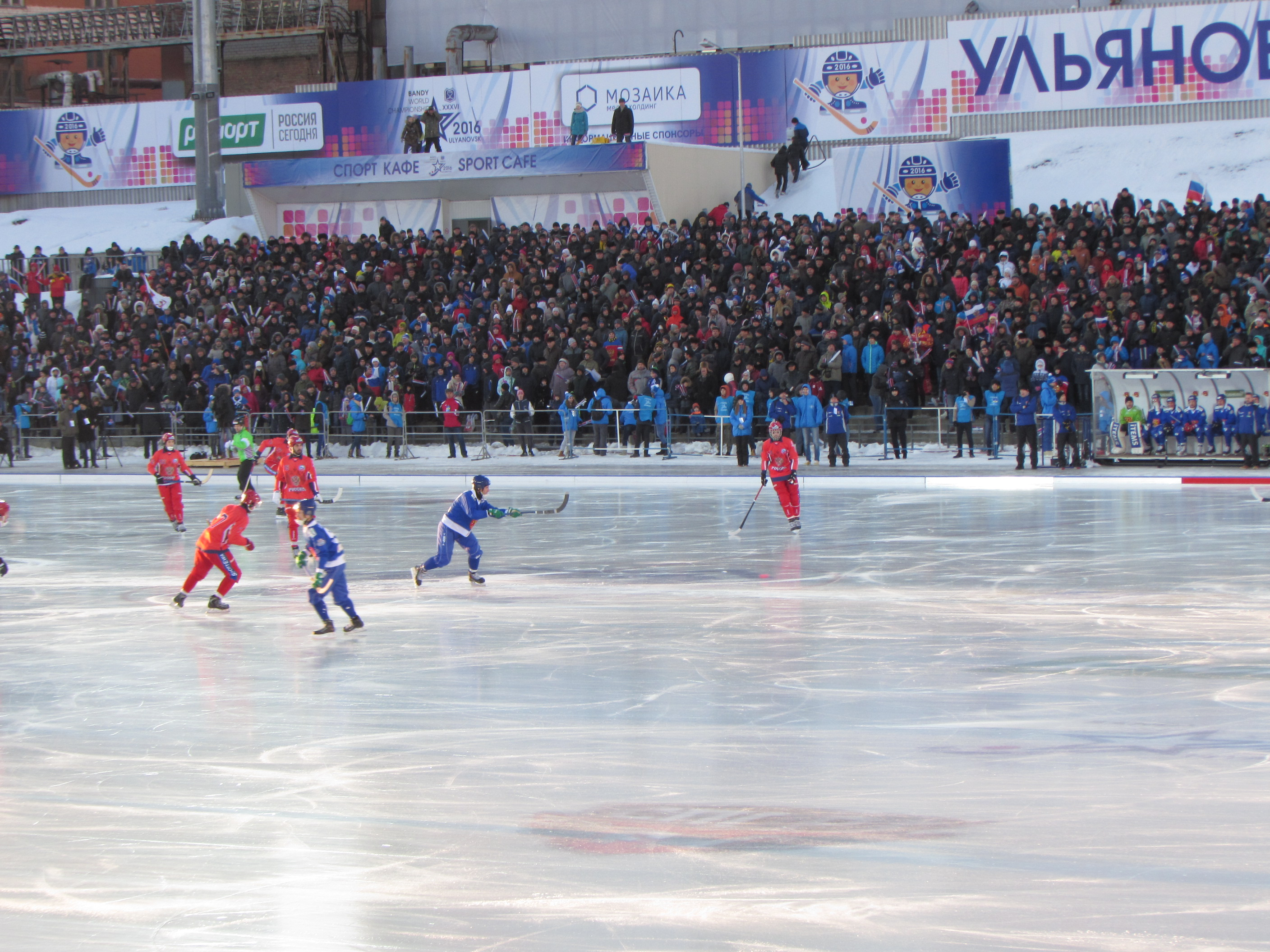
Finland national bandy team in the final of the 2016 World Championship against the victorious home team Russia

Bandy is played throughout Finland. It was the first team sport with a national Finnish championship. The Bandyliiga is still popular. In 2004, Finland won the Bandy World Championship. The game consists of two teams whose goal is to put a single ball in opposing team's goal to score. The game is played on ice, with both teams on skates. In terms of licensed athletes, it is the second biggest winter sport in the world. Finland's Bandy Association (Finnish: Suomen Jääpalloliitto, Swedish: FinlandsBandyförbund) is the governing body for the sport of bandy in Finland. Finland has hosted the Men's Bandy World Championships in 1957, 1967, 1975, 1983, 1991, 2001 and 25 years later in 2026.

=== Pesäpallo ===
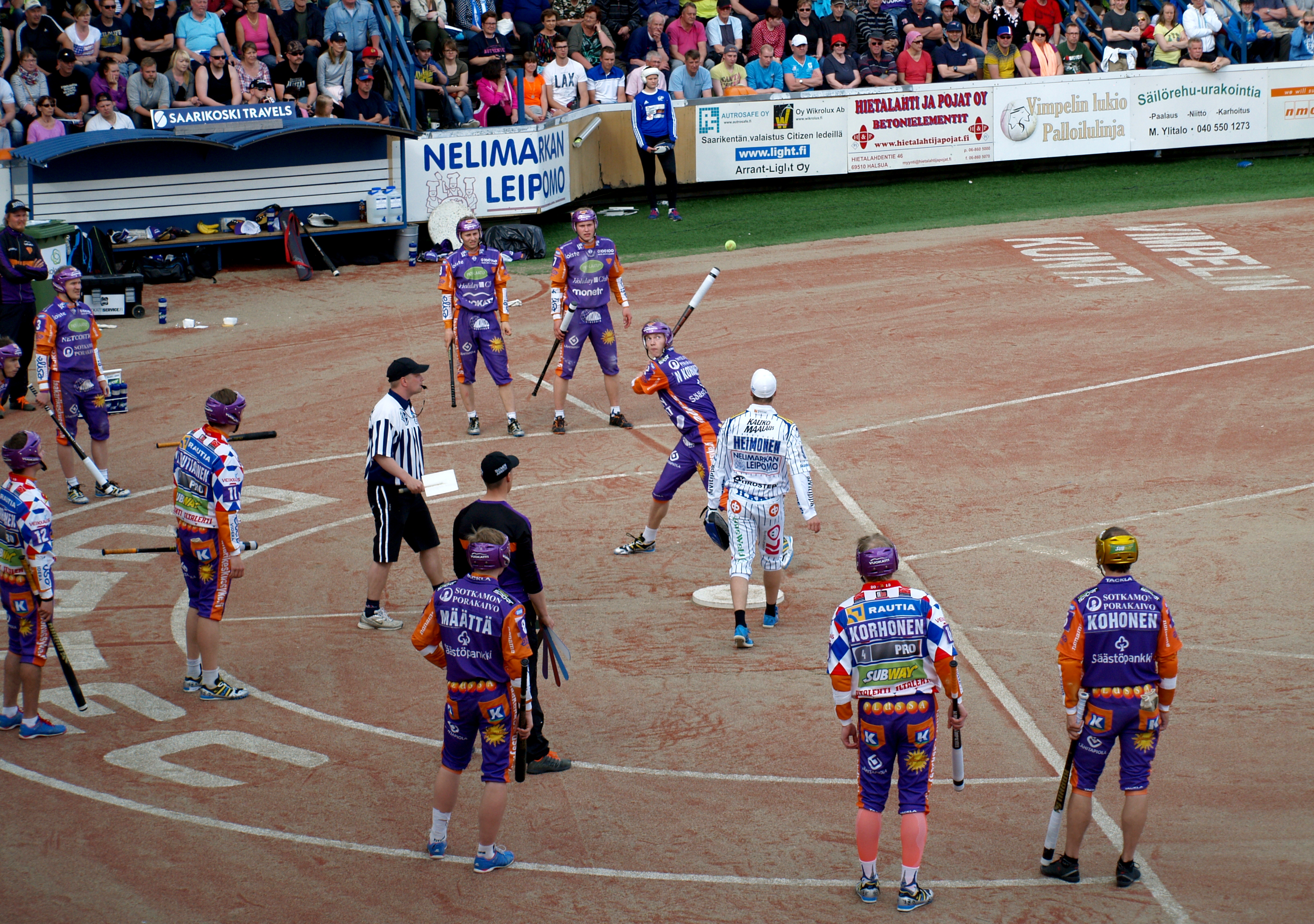
Veto against Jymy at the Saarikenttä stadium in Vimpeli on 19 July 2015

Developed by Lauri "Tahko" Pihkala in the 1920s and often considered as a national sport of Finland, pesäpallo has a steady popularity around the country, especially in the Ostrobothnia region. The main national league, Superpesis, has an attendance average of about 1,600 in men's and 500 in the women's league.

==== Attendances ====
The average attendance per top-flight league season and the pesäpallo club with the highest average attendance:

Season	League average	Best club	Best club average
2023	986	Joensuun Maila	1,685

=== Ringette ===
In 1979, Juhani Wahlsten introduced ringette in Finland. Wahlsten created some teams in Turku. Finland's first ringette club was Ringetteläisiä Turun Siniset, and the country's first ringette tournament took place in December, 1980. In 1979 Juhani Wahlsten invited two coaches, Wendy King and Evelyn Watson, from Dollard-des-Ormeaux, a suburb of Montreal, Quebec, Canada, to teach girls of various ages how to play ringette. The Ringette Association of Turku was established in 1981 and several Canadian coaches went there to initiate the training and help establish the sport. The ski national week then organized an annual tournament to bring together all the ringette teams.

Internationally Canada and Finland have been the most active ambassadors in the International Ringette Federation.

=== Ice cross downhill ===
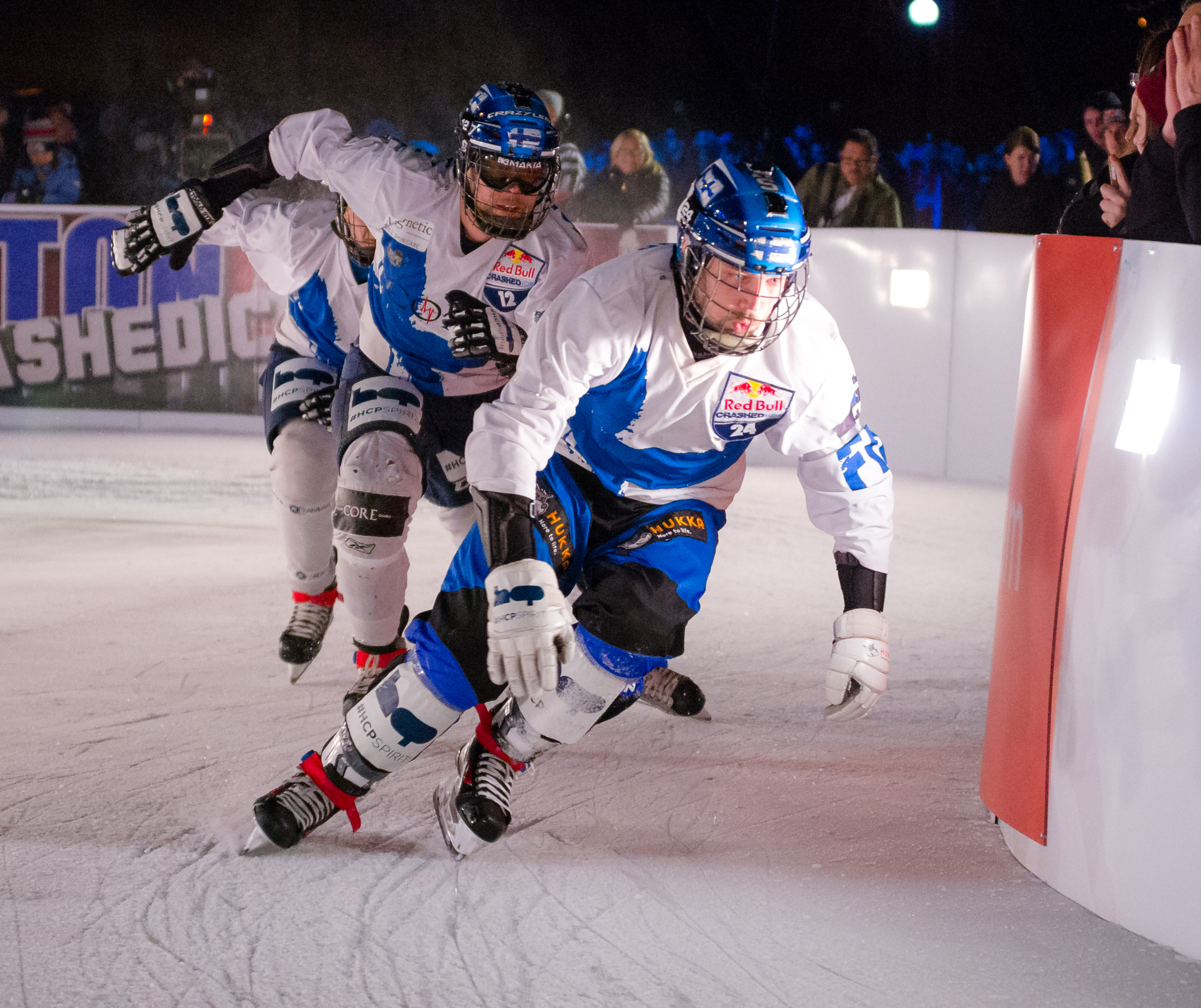
Finns in Red Bull Crashed Ice

Racers are typically athletes with a background in ice hockey, however competitors from the sports of bandy and ringette have also competed with great success, such as Salla Kyhälä from Finland's national ringette team, who also played in Canada's National Ringette League and Mirko Lahti has win Finnish downhill skating championship two times 2020 and 2021. Junior World championship 2017-2018 and Men`s World championship 2022-23.

=== Synchronized Skating ===
Inline skating originated in Finland in the 1980s and was initially known as group patterning. The first Finnish Synchronized skating team, The Rockets (HTK; now Helsinki Rockettes), was founded in 1984. Today, Finland is one of the top countries in figure skating - the teams have done well in international competitions for years. There are more than 100 Synchronized skating teams in Finland.

=== Skiing ===
FIS Nordic World Ski Championships Seefeld 2019 - Men 15 km Interval Start Classic. Picture shows Iivo Niskanen (FIN). Finland has always produced successful competitors in the disciplines of Nordic skiing. Championship-winning male cross-country skiers from Finland include Veli Saarinen (winner of an Olympic gold and three World Championship titles in the 1920s and 1930s), Veikko Hakulinen (who won three Olympic and three World Championship golds in the 1950s and 1960s, as well as a World Championship silver medal in biathlon) and Juha Mieto (who won an Olympic gold medal in 1976 and two overall FIS Cross-Country World Cups). Among female athletes, Marjo Matikainen-Kallström won a gold at the 1988 Winter Olympics, three World Championships and three overall World Cups and Marja-Liisa Kirvesniemi won three golds at both the Olympics and World Championships and two overall World Cup titles.

Finland has been the most successful nation in Ski jumping at the Winter Olympics, having won ten golds, eight silvers and four bronze medals. Notable names include Matti Nykänen, a four-time Olympic gold medalist, a five time Ski Jumping World Champion, the 1985 winner of the FIS Ski-Flying World Championships, a four-time winner of the overall World Cup title, and a double winner of the prestigious Four Hills Tournament. More recently Janne Ahonen has been one of the top competitors in the sport since the mid-1990s, winning five World Championship golds and two overall World Cups. He is also the record holder for wins in the Four Hills Tournament, having won the competition five times.

As a country strong in both cross-country skiing and ski jumping Finland has also enjoyed success in Nordic combined. Heikki Hasu won golds in Nordic combined in the 1948 and 1952 Olympics, as well as a cross-country gold in the 4 x 10 kilometre relay at the 1952 Olympics. He also won a World Championship gold in 1950. Eero Mäntyranta won 7 Olympic medals (3 golds, 2 silvers, and 2 bronzes) spread over the 1960, 1964, and 1968 Olympics in addition to his five World Championship medals (2 gold, 2 silver and a bronze) spread over the 1962 and 1966 games. Samppa Lajunen won three Olympic golds at the 2002 Olympics and two FIS Nordic Combined World Cups. Hannu Manninen won the World Cup for four consecutive seasons between 2003/4 and 2006/7.

Although traditionally not as strong as Norway, Sweden, Germany and Russia in biathlon, Finland has had world-class competitors in this discipline. Heikki Ikola and Juhani Suutarinen were both highly successful in the 1970s - Ikola won four World Championship golds and Suutarinen won three. In 2011 Kaisa Mäkäräinen won a World Championship title in the pursuit at the Biathlon World Championships and was Biathlon World Cup champion. She won her second overall Biathlon World Cup in 2014, and a third in 2018.

In recent years Finnish skiers have enjoyed success in the technical disciplines of alpine skiing. Kalle Palander was Slalom World Champion in 1999 and World Cup Slalom champion in the 2003 Alpine Skiing World Cup. Tanja Poutiainen won three discipline World Cup titles in Slalom and Giant Slalom in the 2000s.

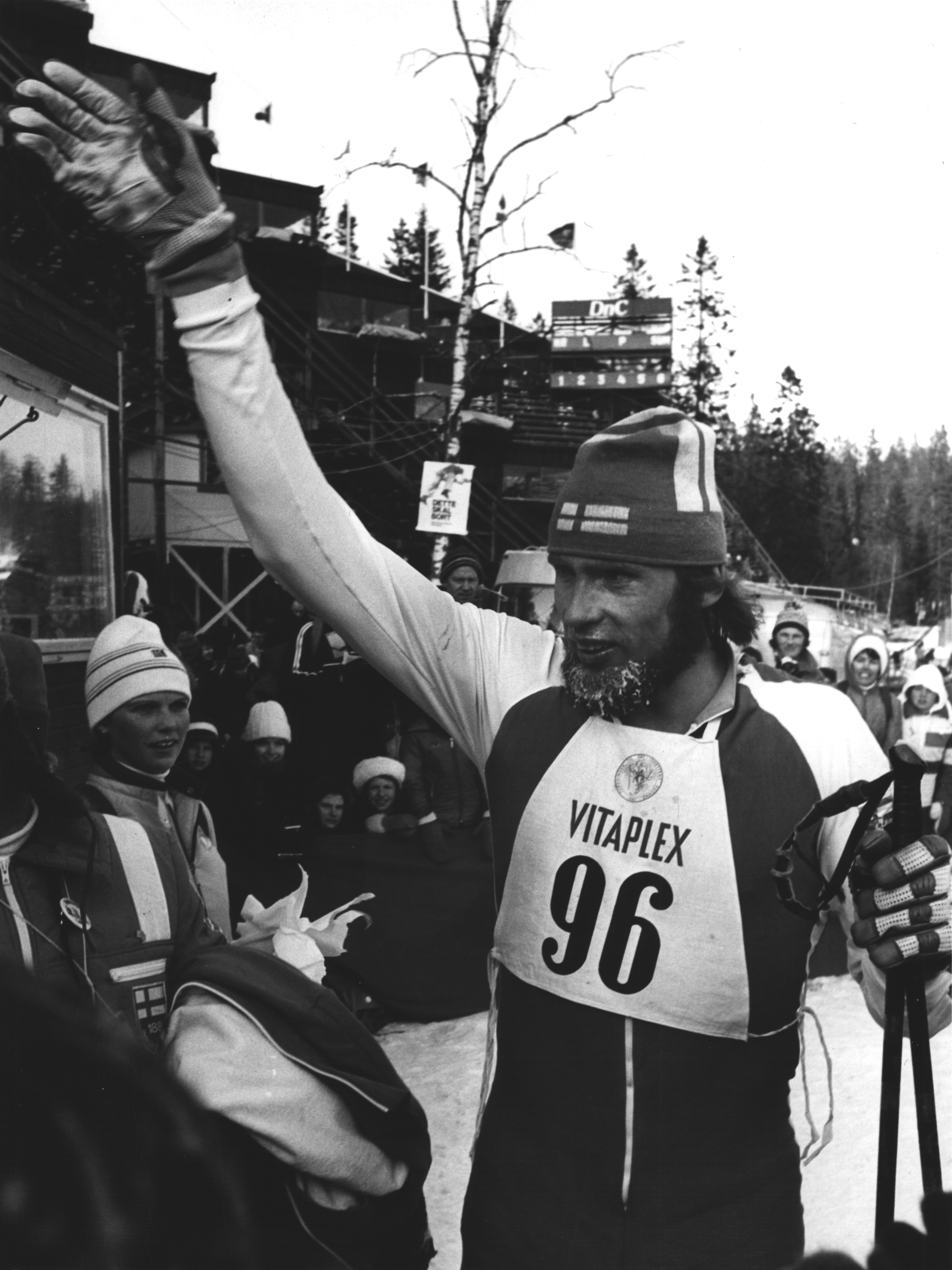
Juha Mieto

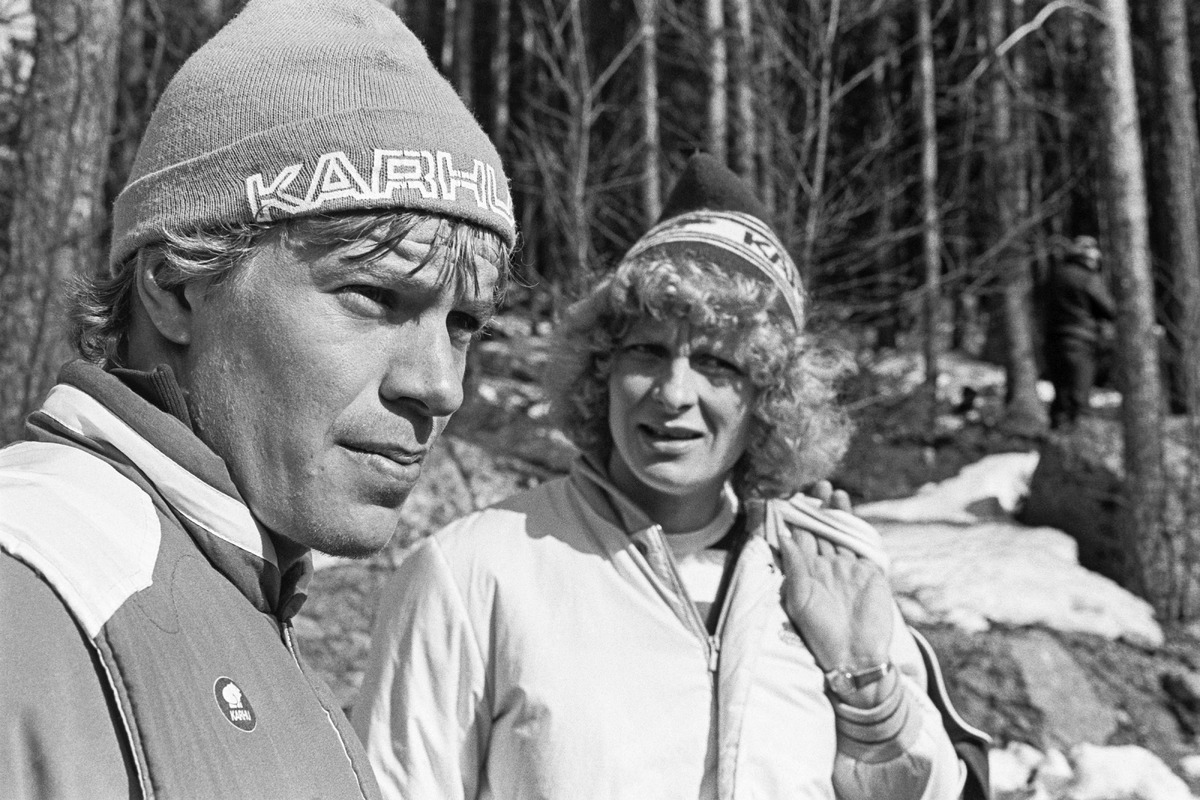
Harri Kirvesniemi and Marja-Liisa Hämäläinen

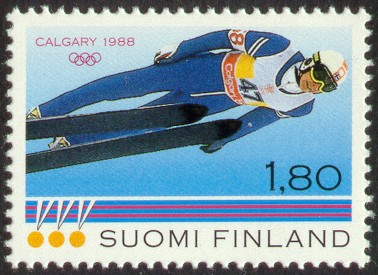
Matti Nykänen

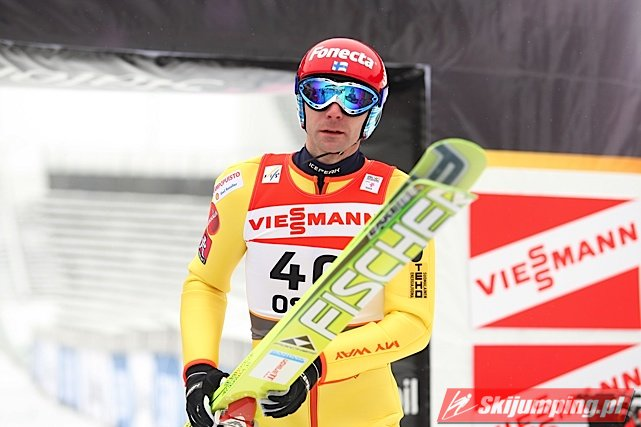
Janne Ahonen

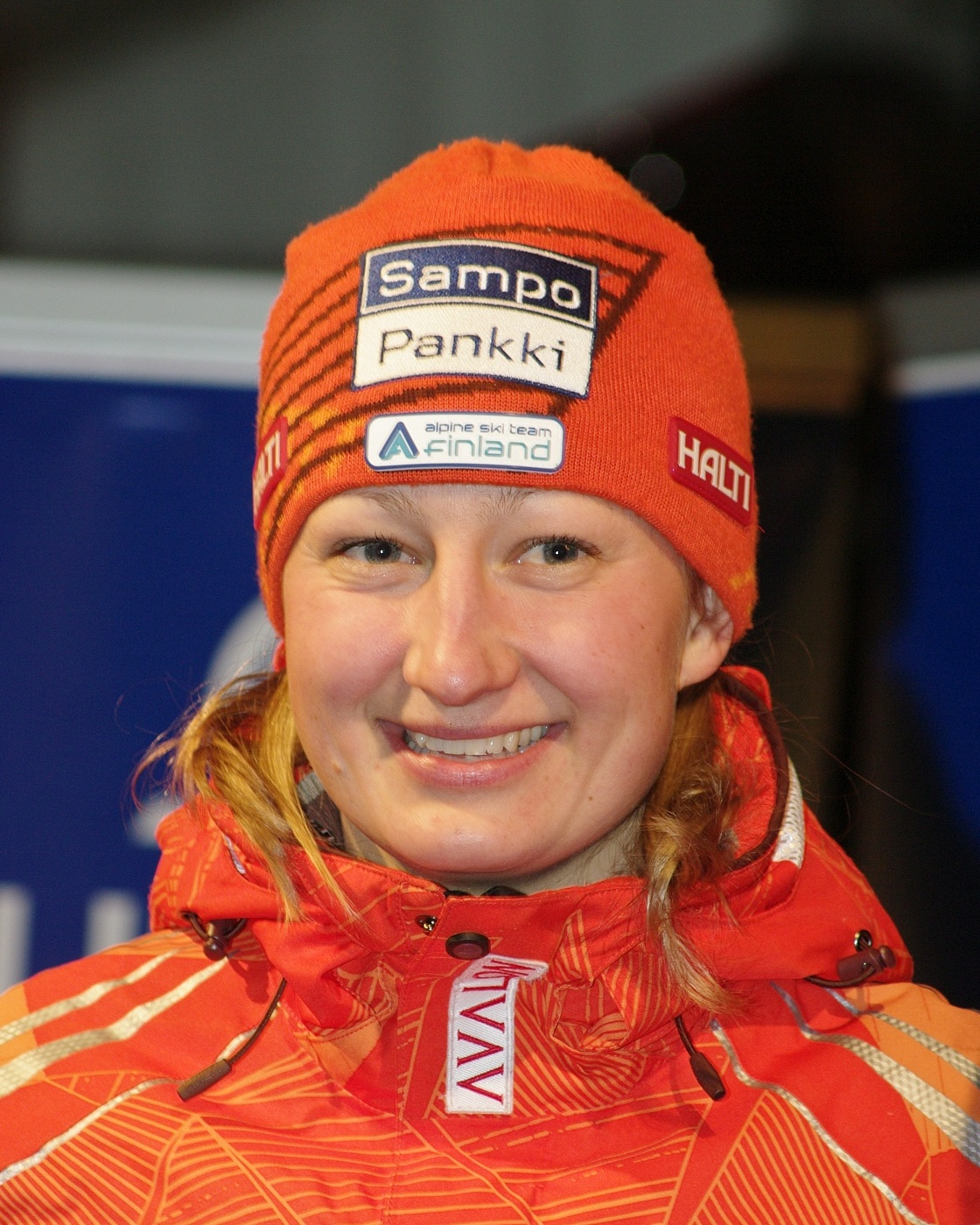
Tanja Poutiainen

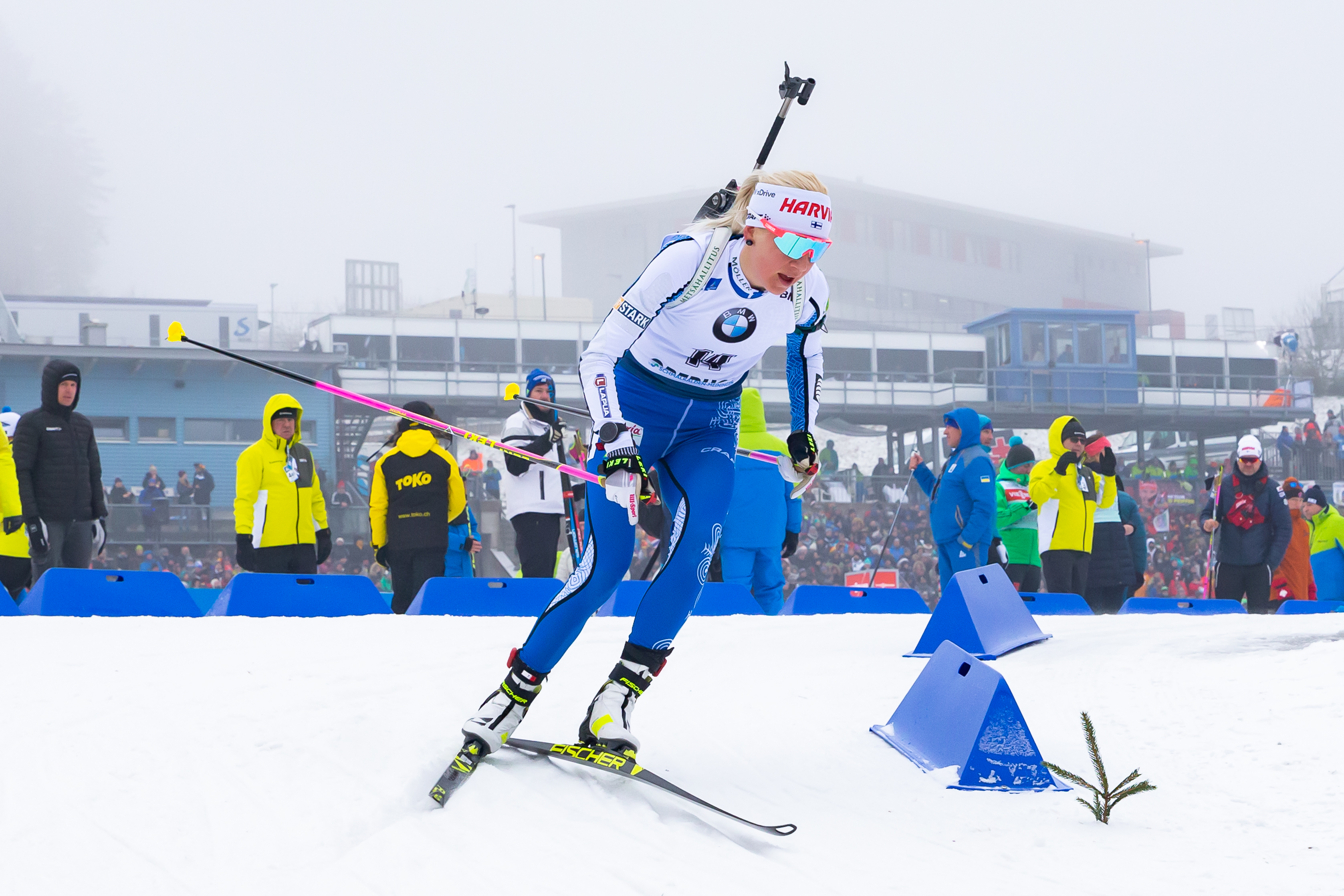
Kaisa Mäkäräinen

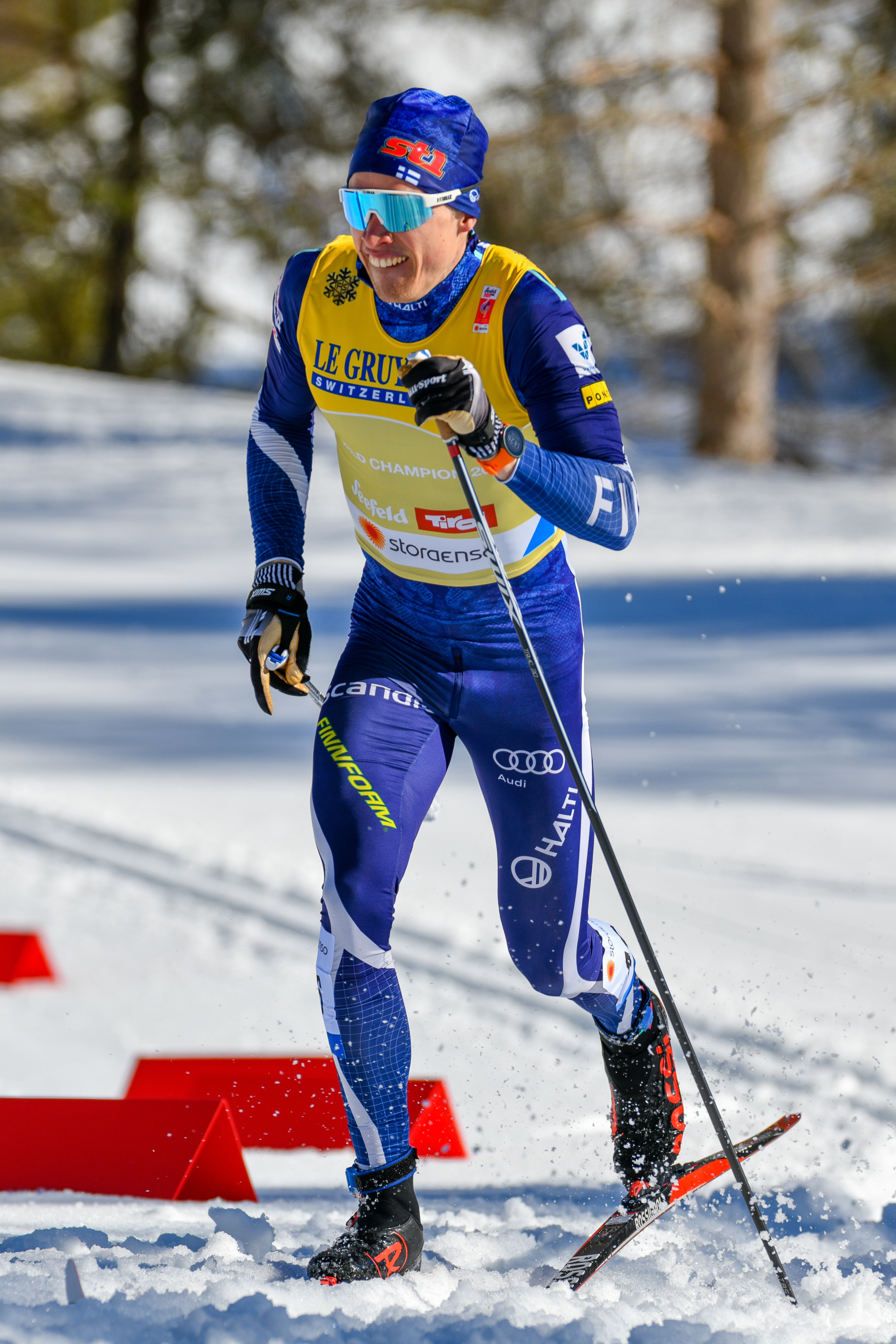
Iivo Niskanen

=== Athletics ===
The sport of athletics has historically been an important part of both Finnish sports history and national identity. Hannes Kolehmainen has been said to "run Finland onto the world map" at the 1912 Summer Olympics, and from the 1920 Summer Olympics to World War II Finland was the second most successful country in athletics, as only the United States managed to collect more Olympic medals. Javelin throw is the only event in which Finland has enjoyed success all the way from the 1900s to this day. Thus, it is currently the most popular athletics event in Finland. Jukola Relay and Venla's Relay are the largest and the most famous orienteering events in Finland.

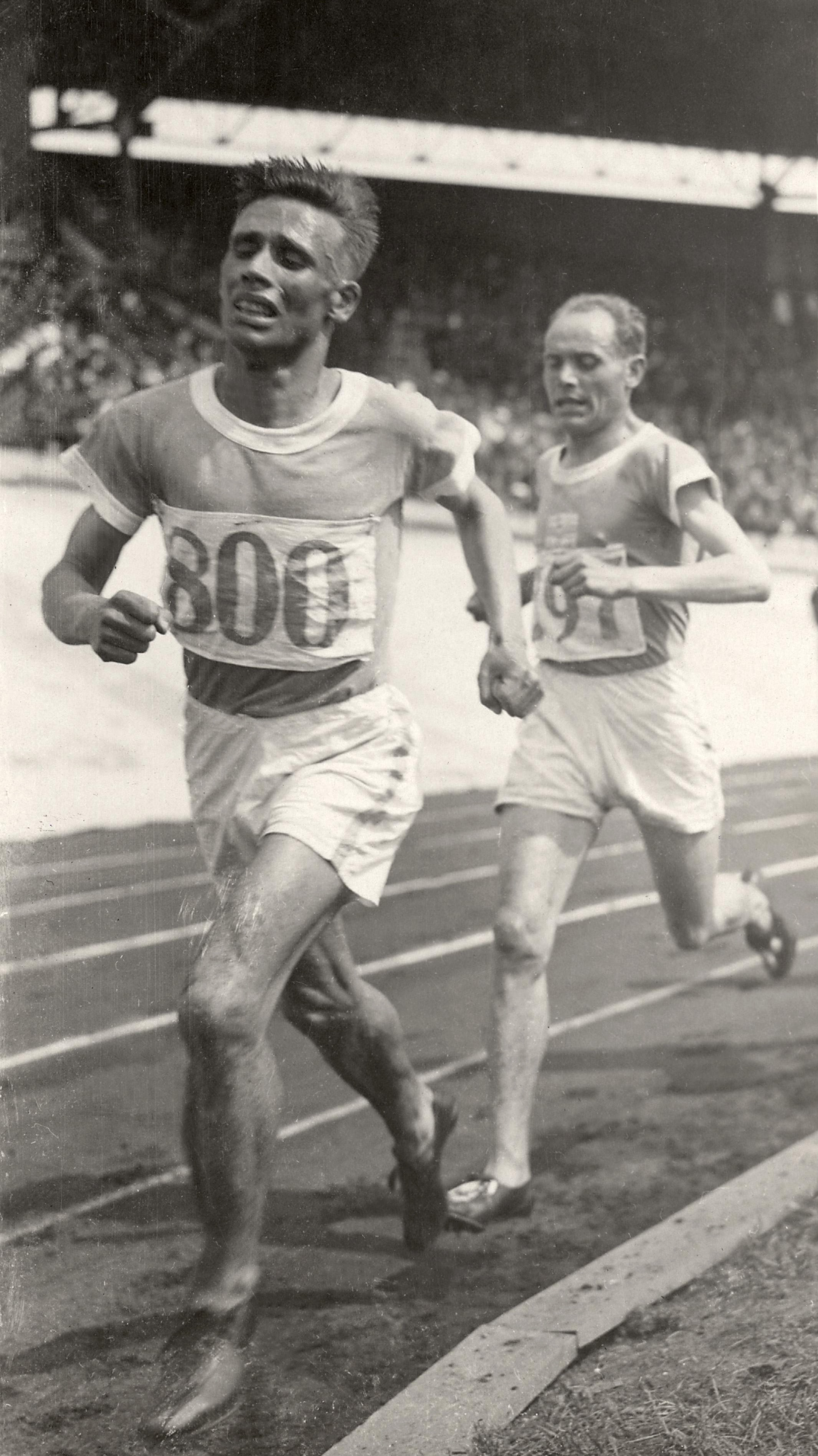
Ville Ritola and Paavo Nurmi

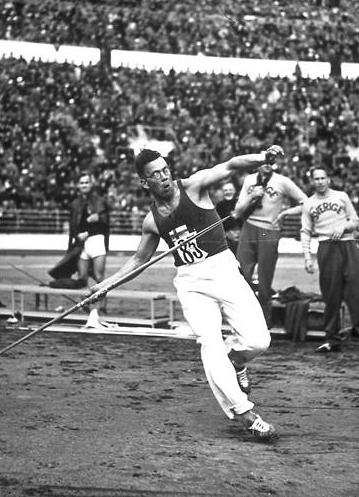
Matti Järvinen

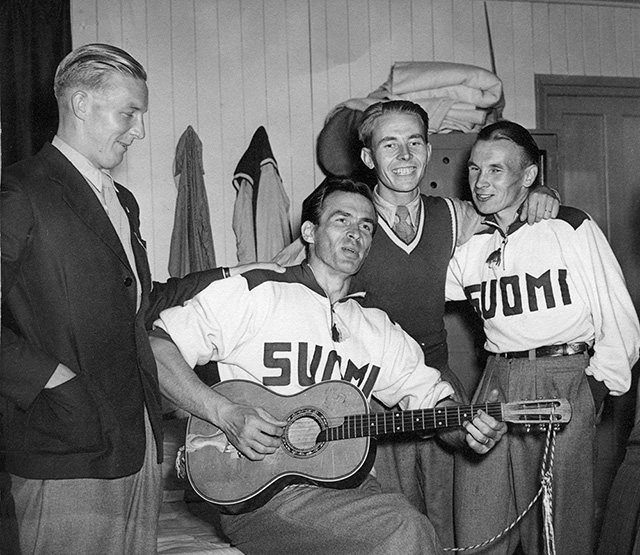
Tapio Rautavaara, Kuuno Honkonen, Pentti Siltaloppi and Salomon Könönen at the 1948 Summer Olympics

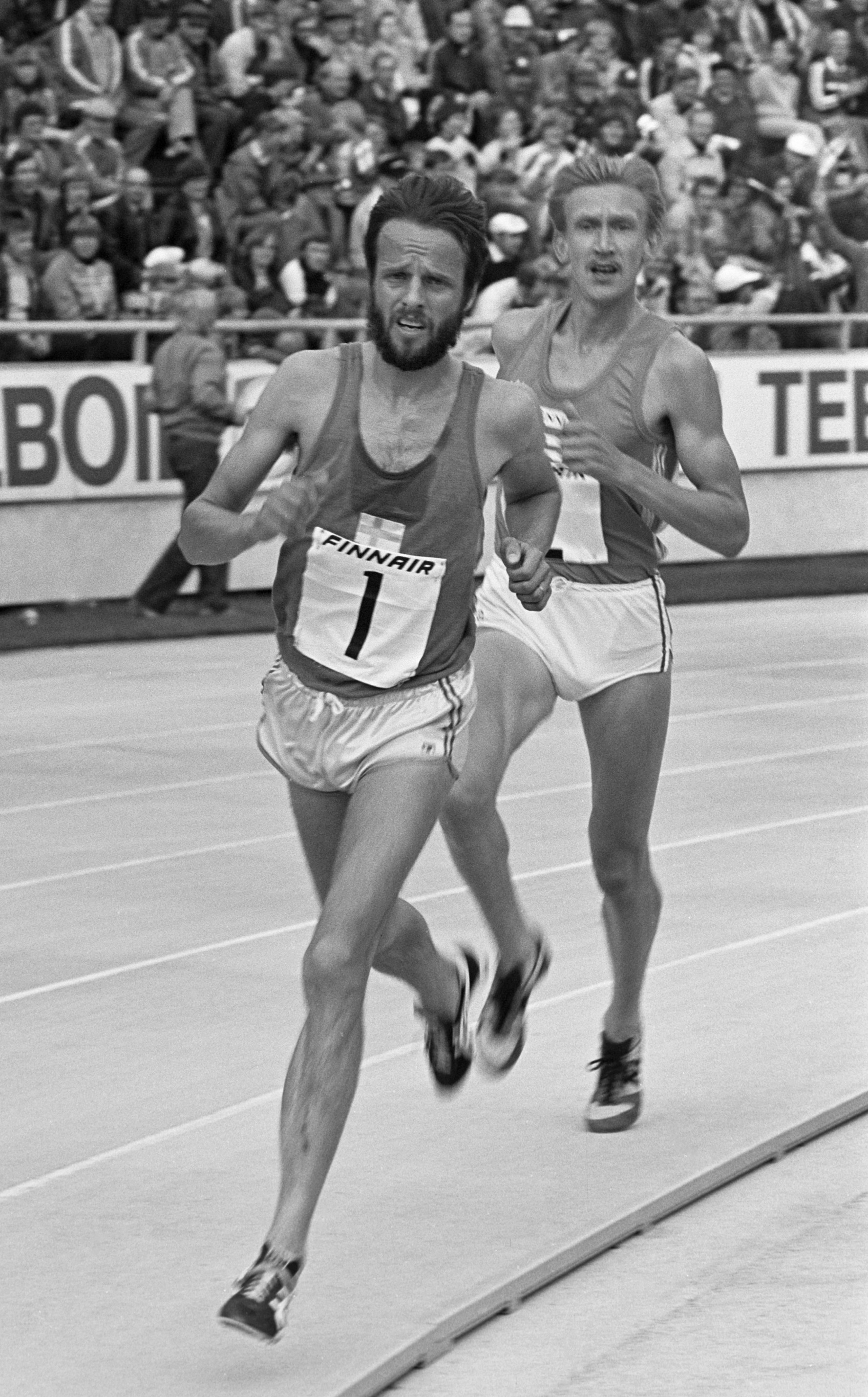
Lasse Viren and Martti Vainio

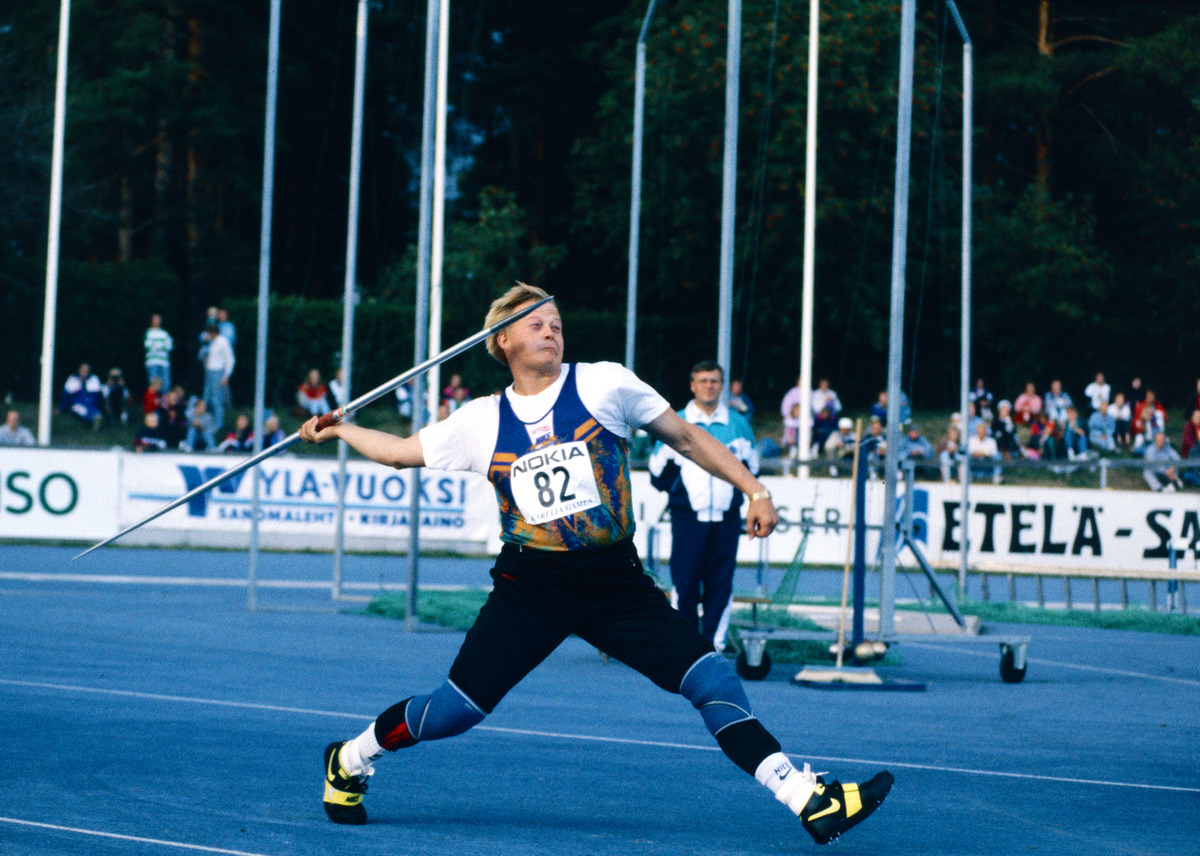
Seppo Räty

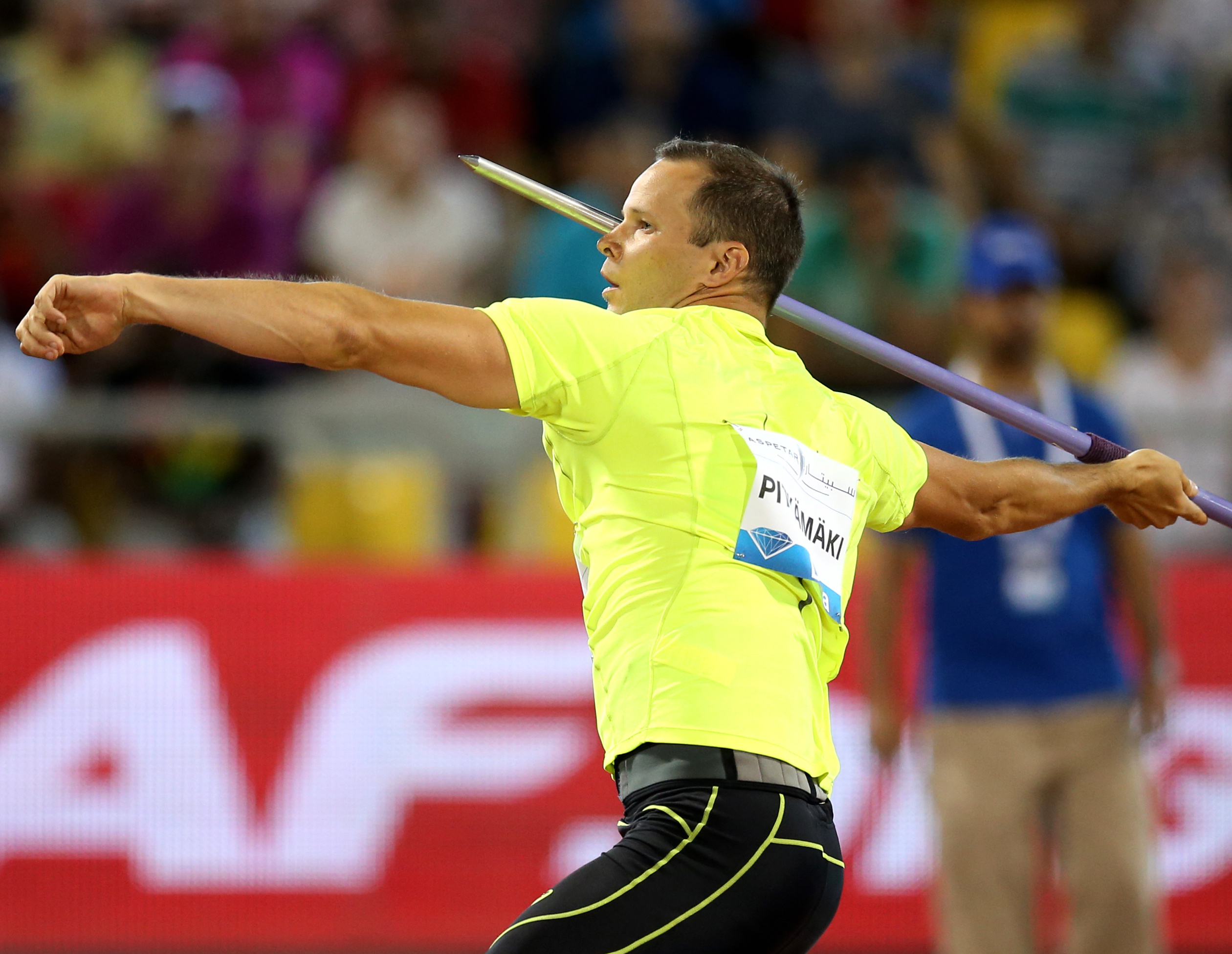
Tero Pitkämäki

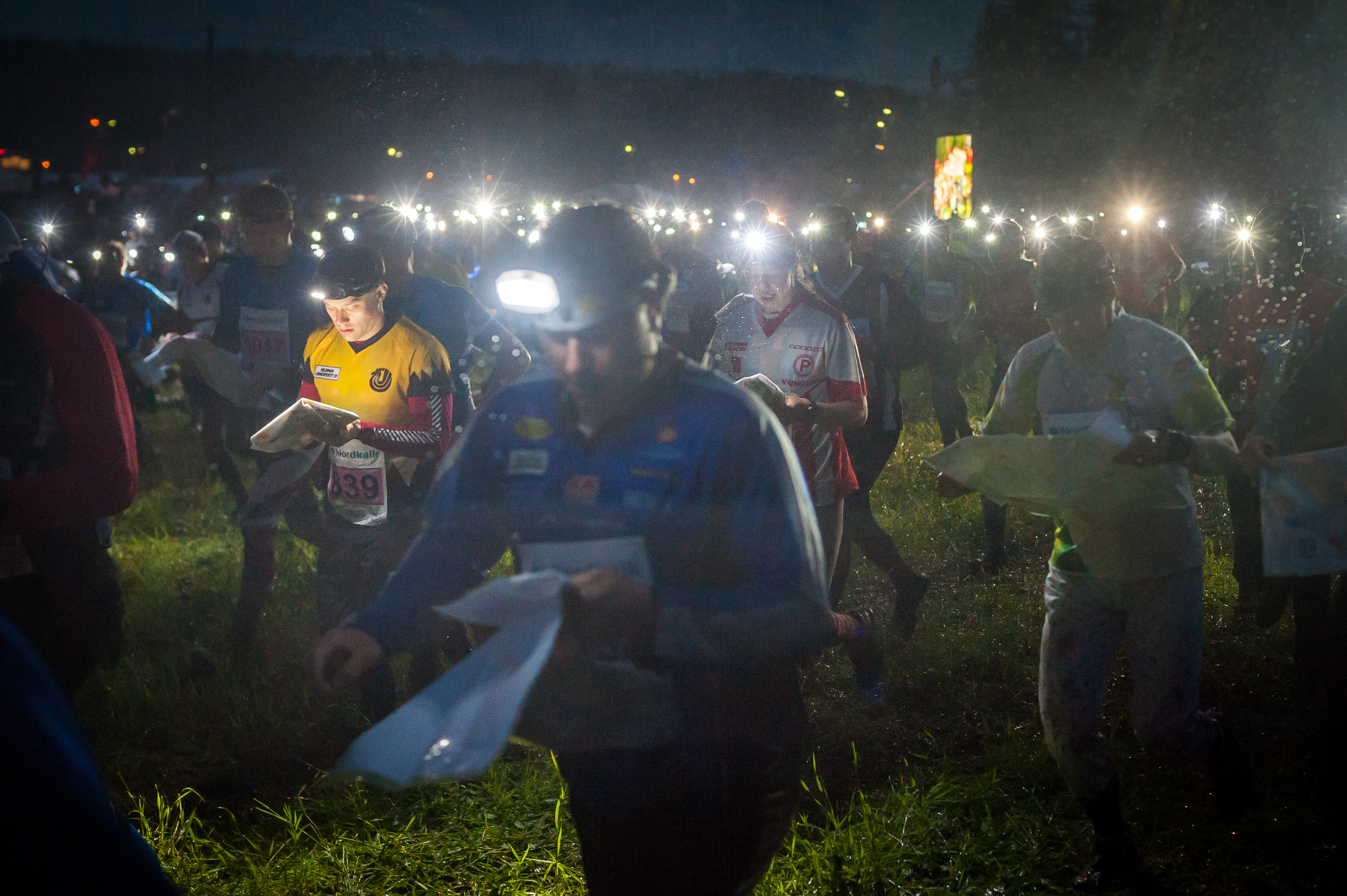
Jukola relay is the world's largest orienteering competition

=== Combat sports ===
==== Wrestling ====
Wrestling was a successful sport for Finns in the early 20th century. The first wrestling club was the Helsingin Atleettiklubi founded in 1891, and the Finnish championship series (SM-kilpailut) were organized for the first time in 1898. Verner Weckman won his series At the 1906 Athens Intermediate Olympics and achieved Finland's first official Olympic victory two years later in London. In total, Finns won 20 Olympic gold medals in wrestling between 1908 and 1936, thirteen of them in Greco-Roman wrestling and seven in freestyle wrestling. From the period after the Second World War, Finland has six wrestling gold medals, five of which are from Greco-Roman wrestling. The last Finnish men's world champion is Marko Yli-Hannuksela from 1997, but the European Finns have won championships even in the 2000s, when women's wrestling became more common, and in 2018 Petra Olli became the first Finnish female wrestler to win the world championship.

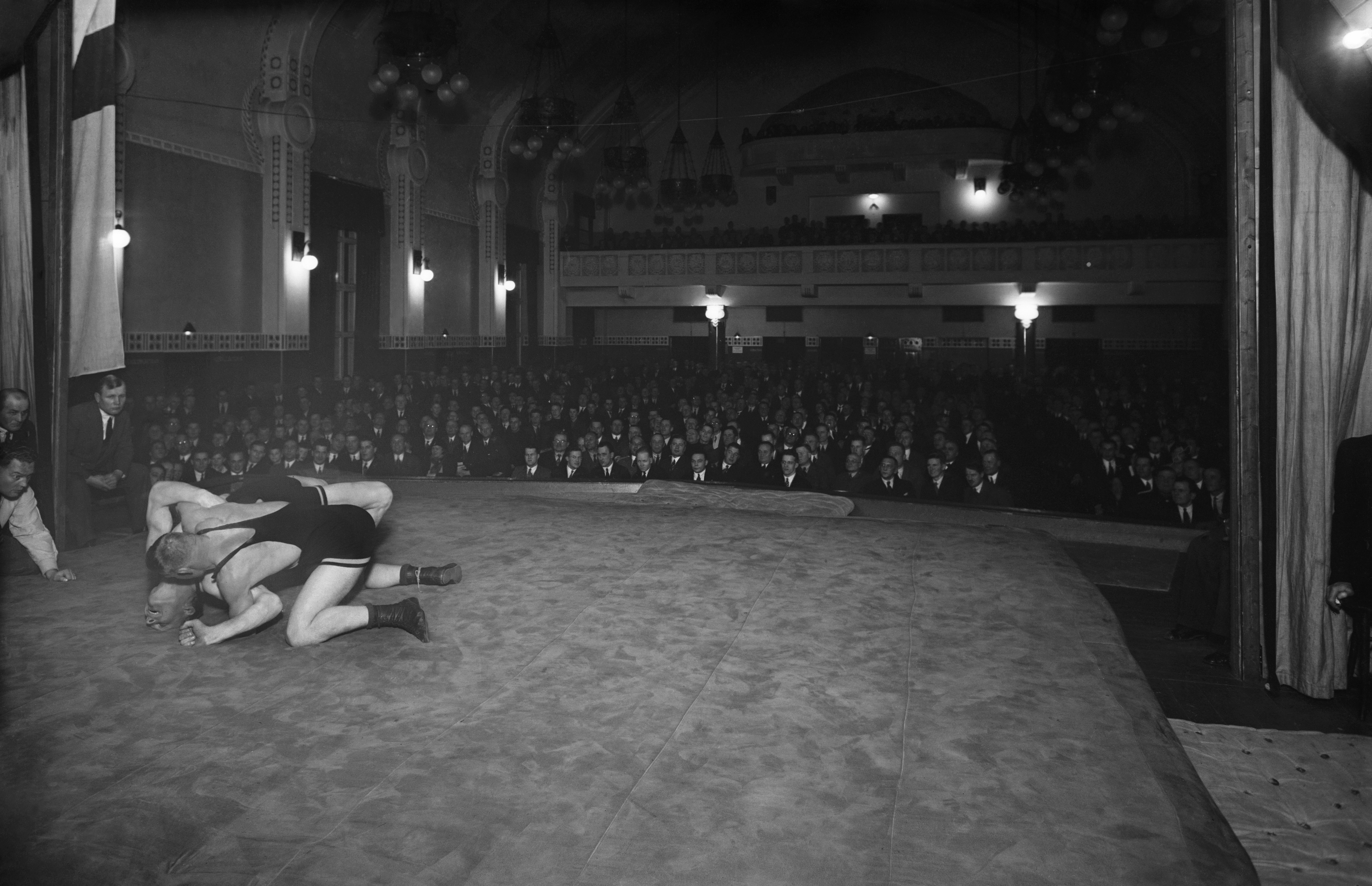
Finnish wrestling competitions (1932)

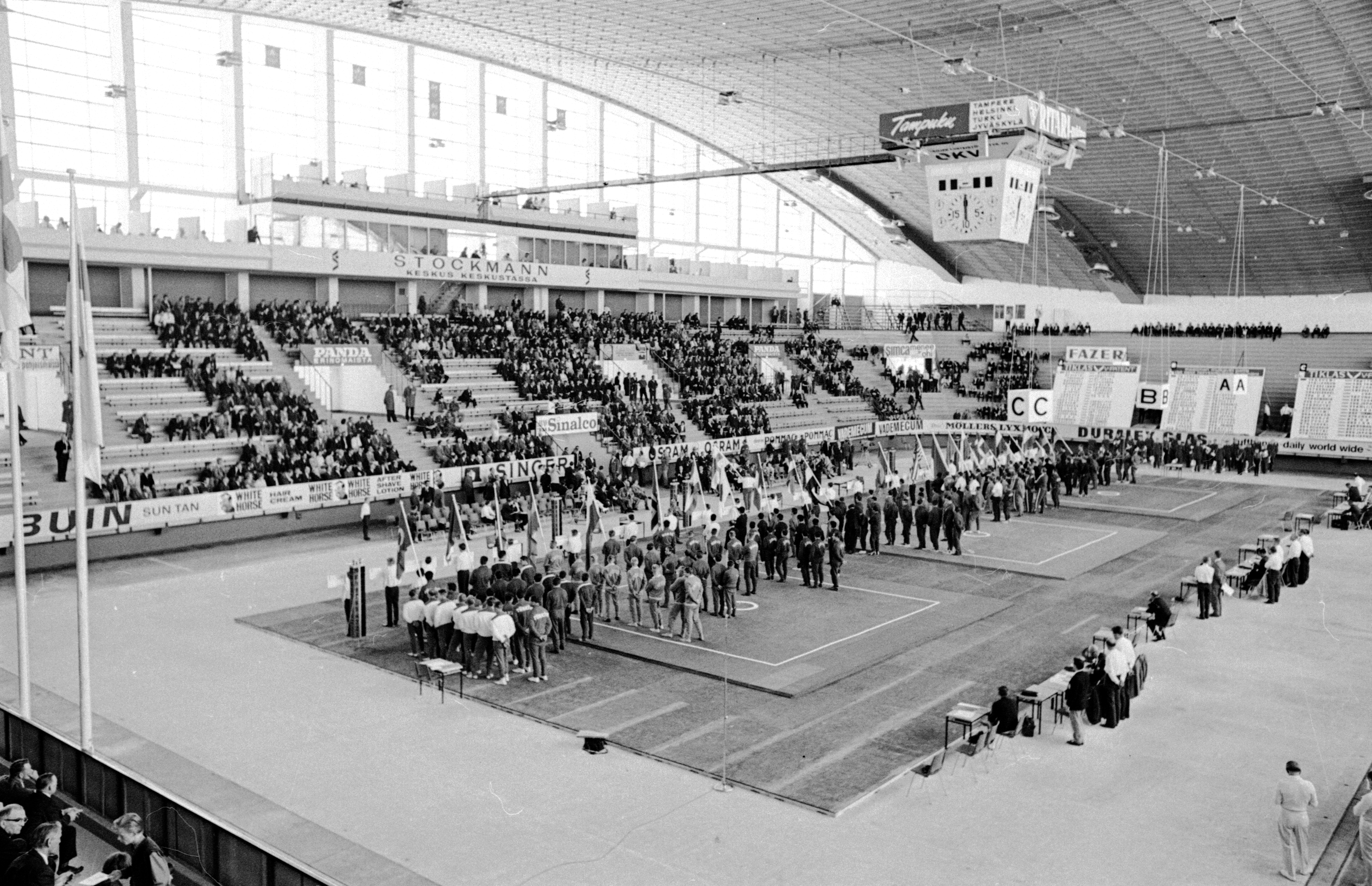
Wrestling World Championships at Tampere Ice Stadium (1965)

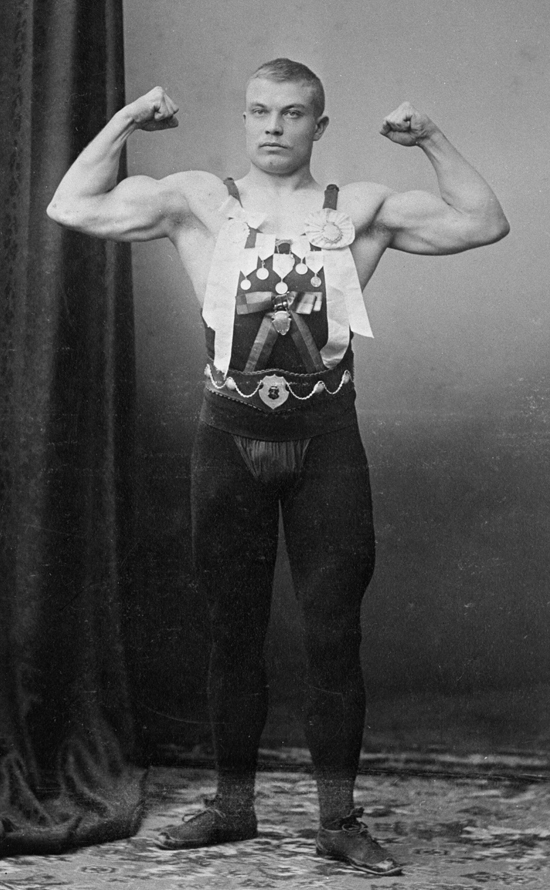
Verner Weckman

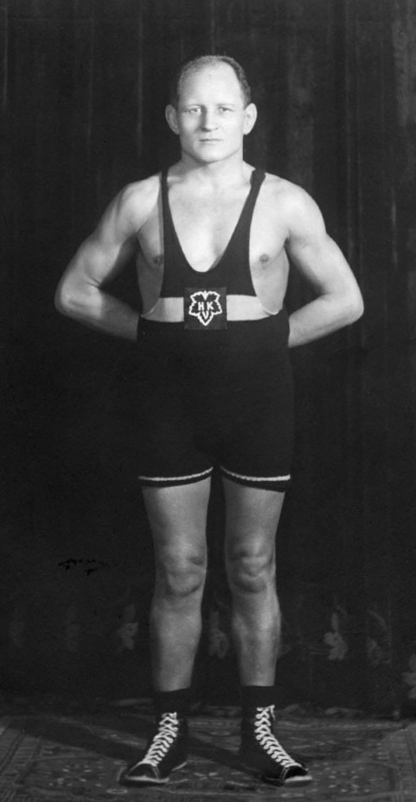
Kalle Anttila

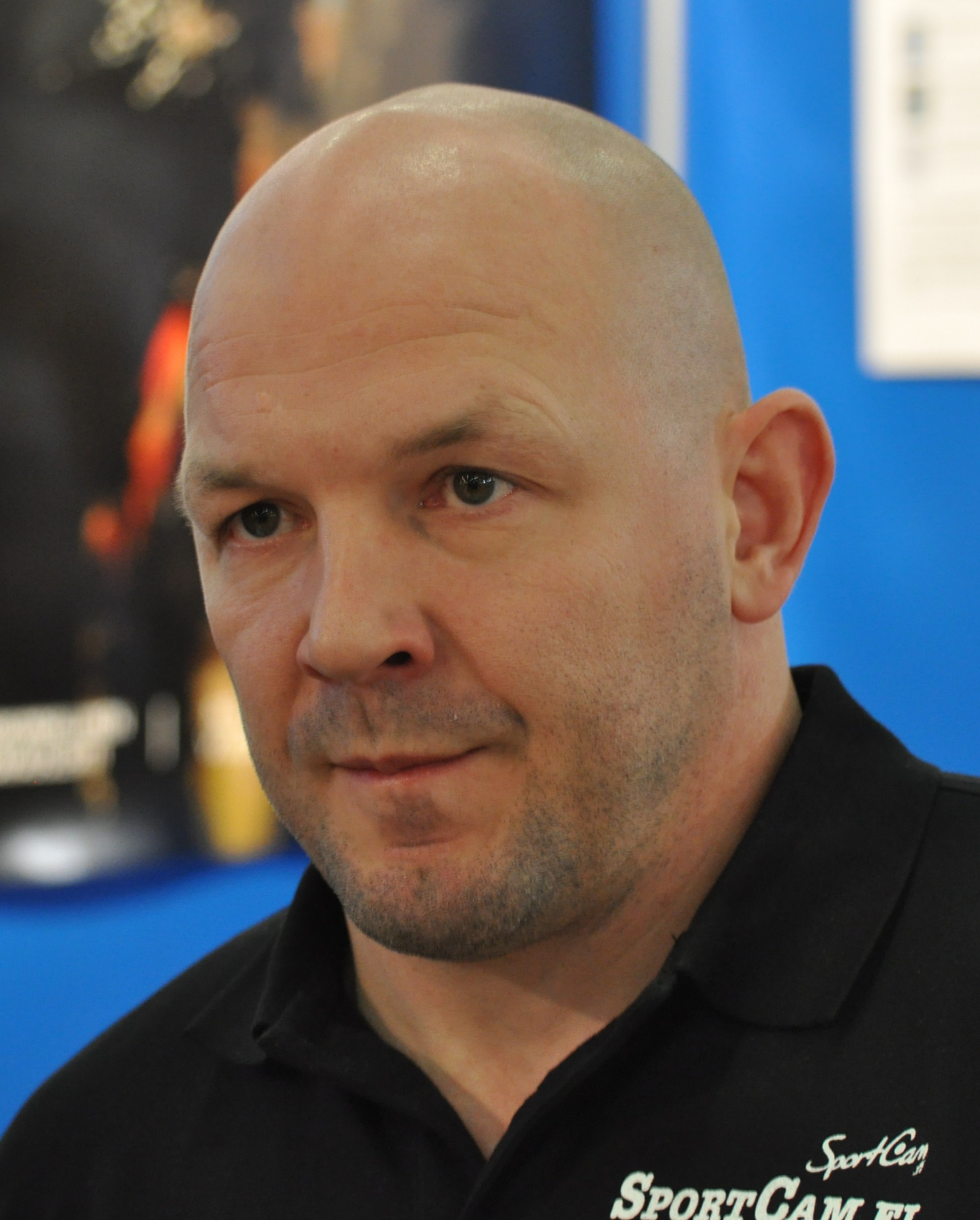
Marko Yli-Hannuksela

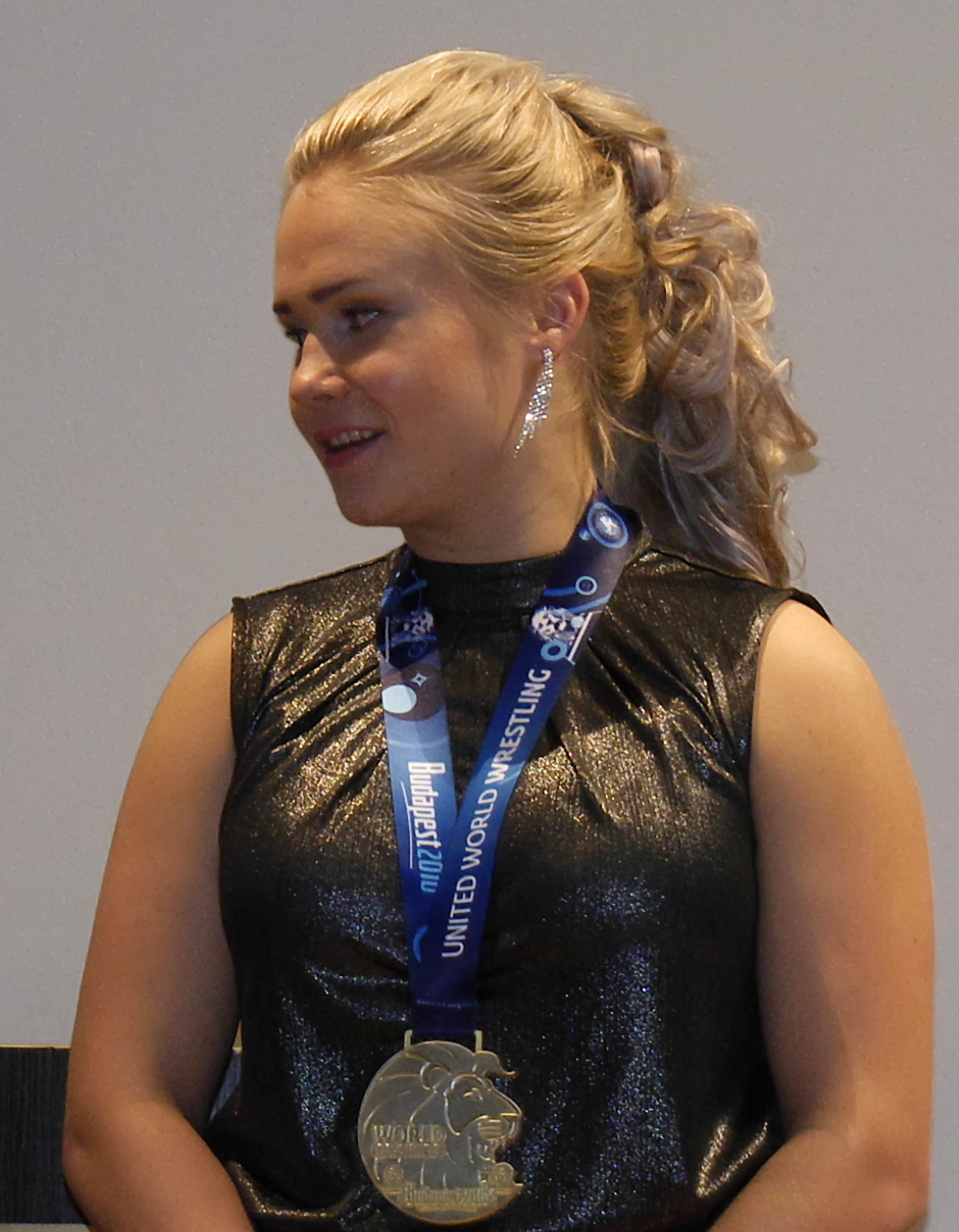
Petra Olli

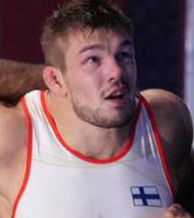
Arvi Savolainen

==== Boxing ====
Finnish boxing championship competitions started in 1923. Finnish Olympic champions are Sten Suvio from 1936 and Pentti Hämäläinen from 1952. However, the most famous Finnish boxer of the 1930s was Gunnar Bärlund, who was the second challenger to world champion Joe Louis in the professional boxing heavyweight rankings. The first Finn to compete in the professional world championship was Olli Mäki, who lost to Davey Moore in the World Championship match at the Helsinki Olympic Stadium in August 1962. Mäki is the only Finn who has won both the amateur and professional European championships. The amateur WC medal has been achieved by Tarmo Uusivirta 1978 and 1982, Jyri Kjäll 1993 and Joni Turunen 1995 and 2001. Women's boxing n's biggest star is Eva Wahlström, who in 2015 was the first Finn to win the world championship in professional boxing. Today, Robert Helenius is Finland's most successful boxer.

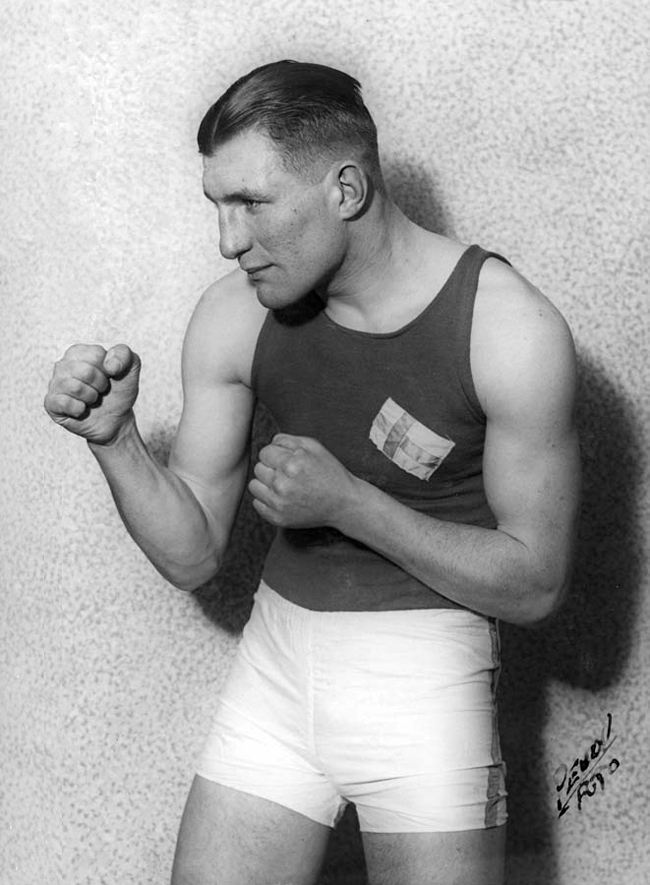
Gunnar Bärlund

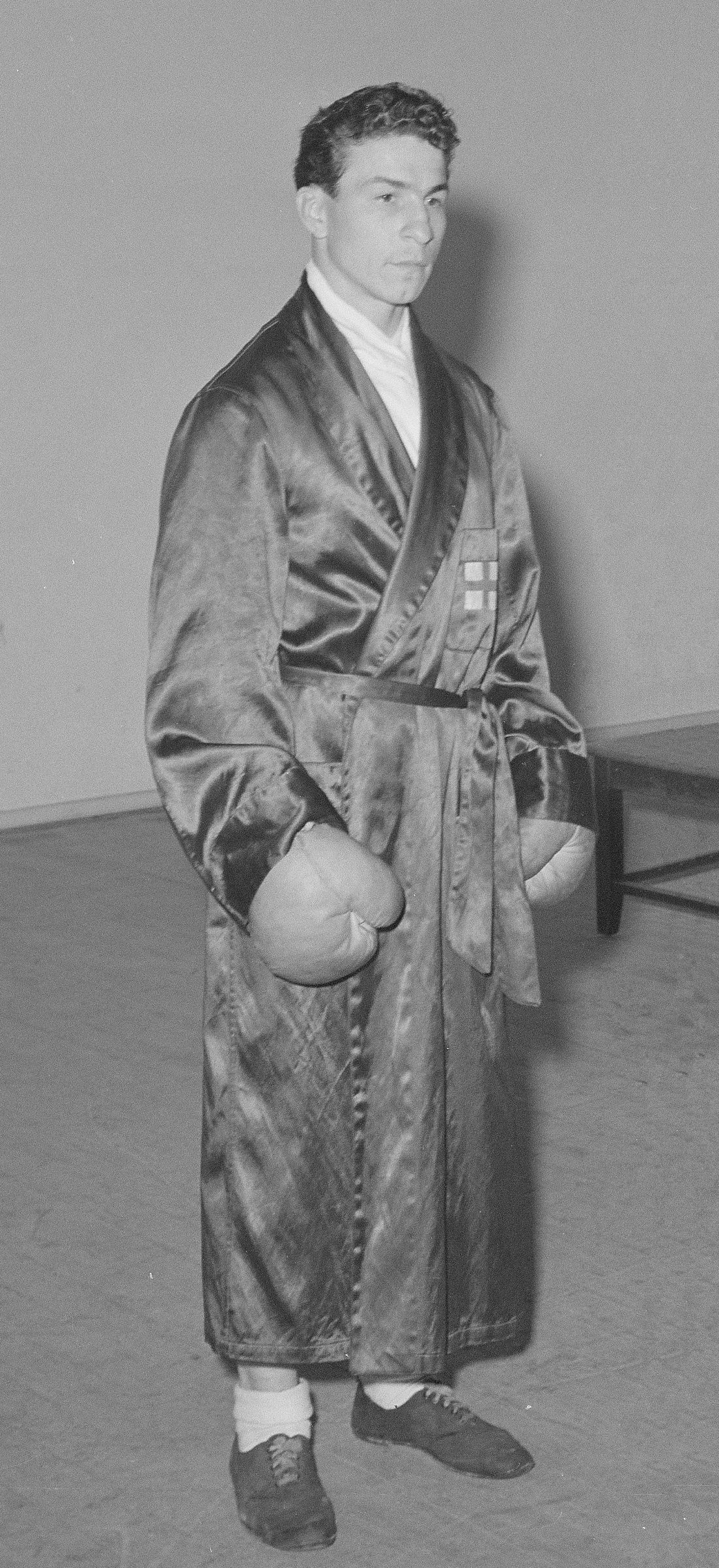
Sten Suvio

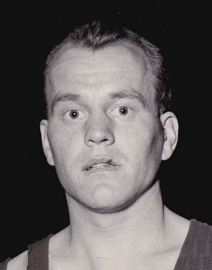
Pentti Hämäläinen

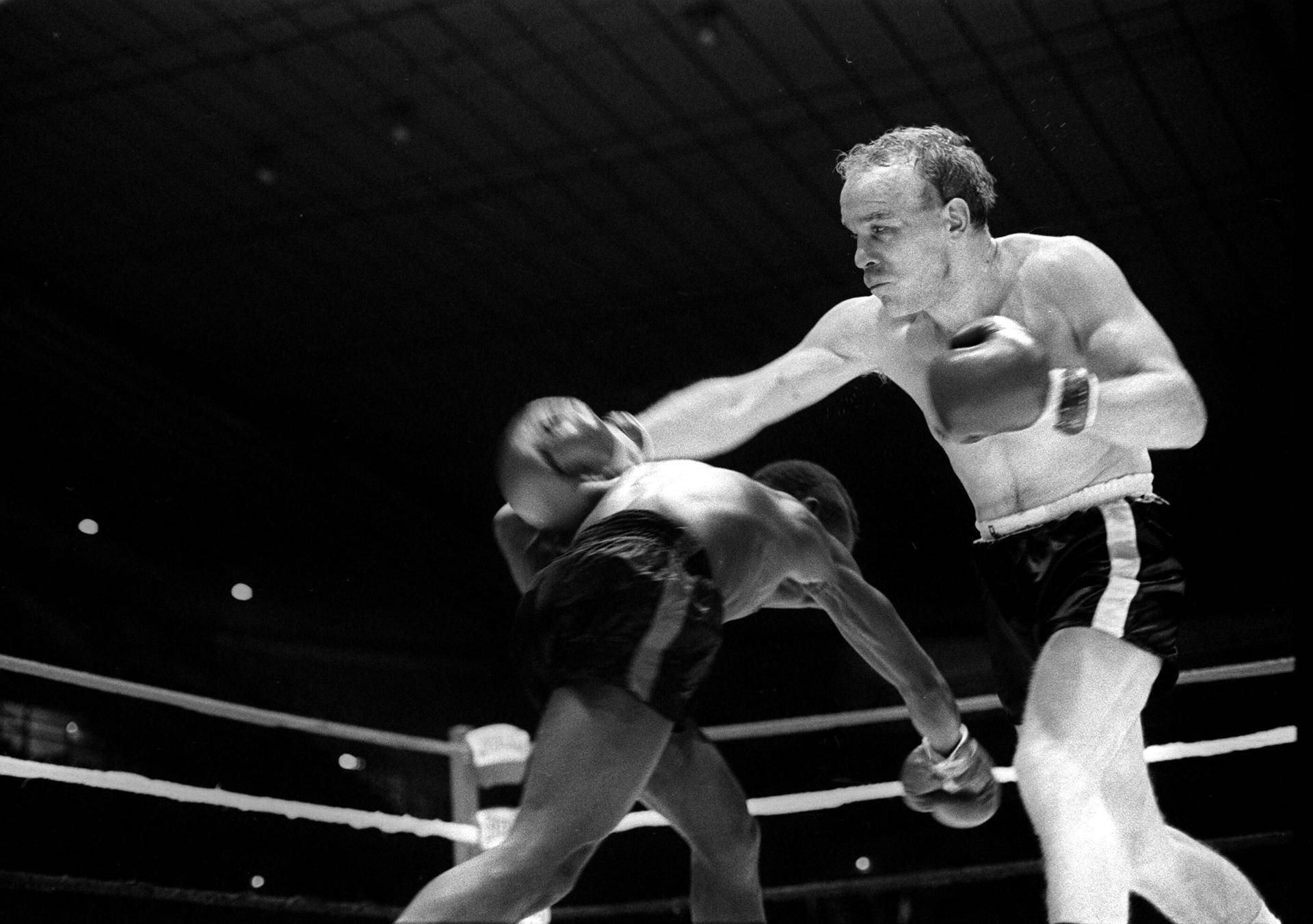
Olli Mäki

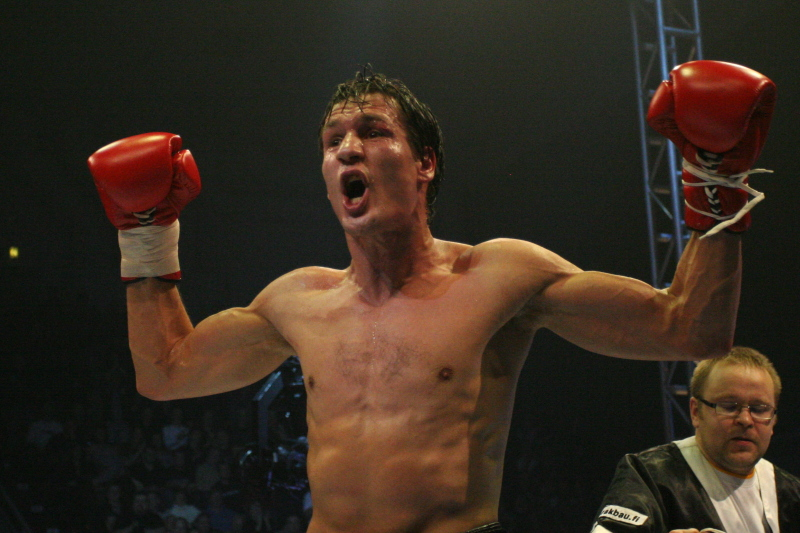
Amin Asikainen

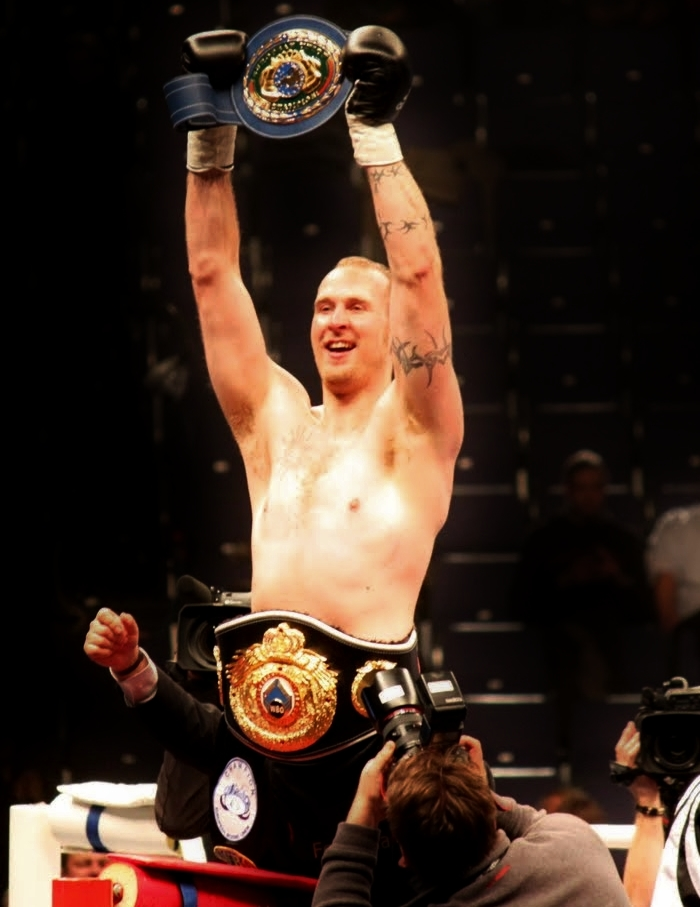
Robert Helenius

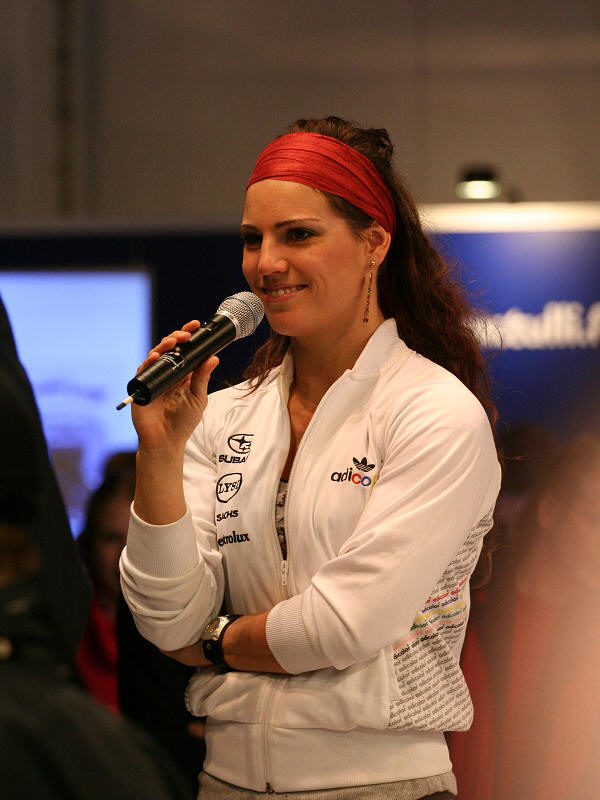
Eva Wahlstrom

=== Finnish Professional Wrestlers ===
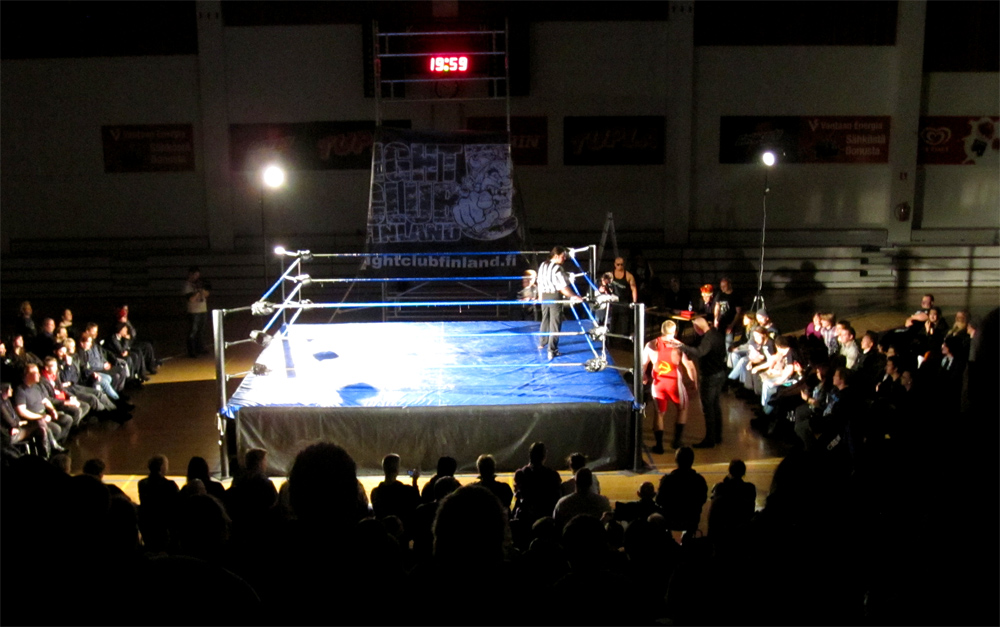
FCF Winter War wrestling event

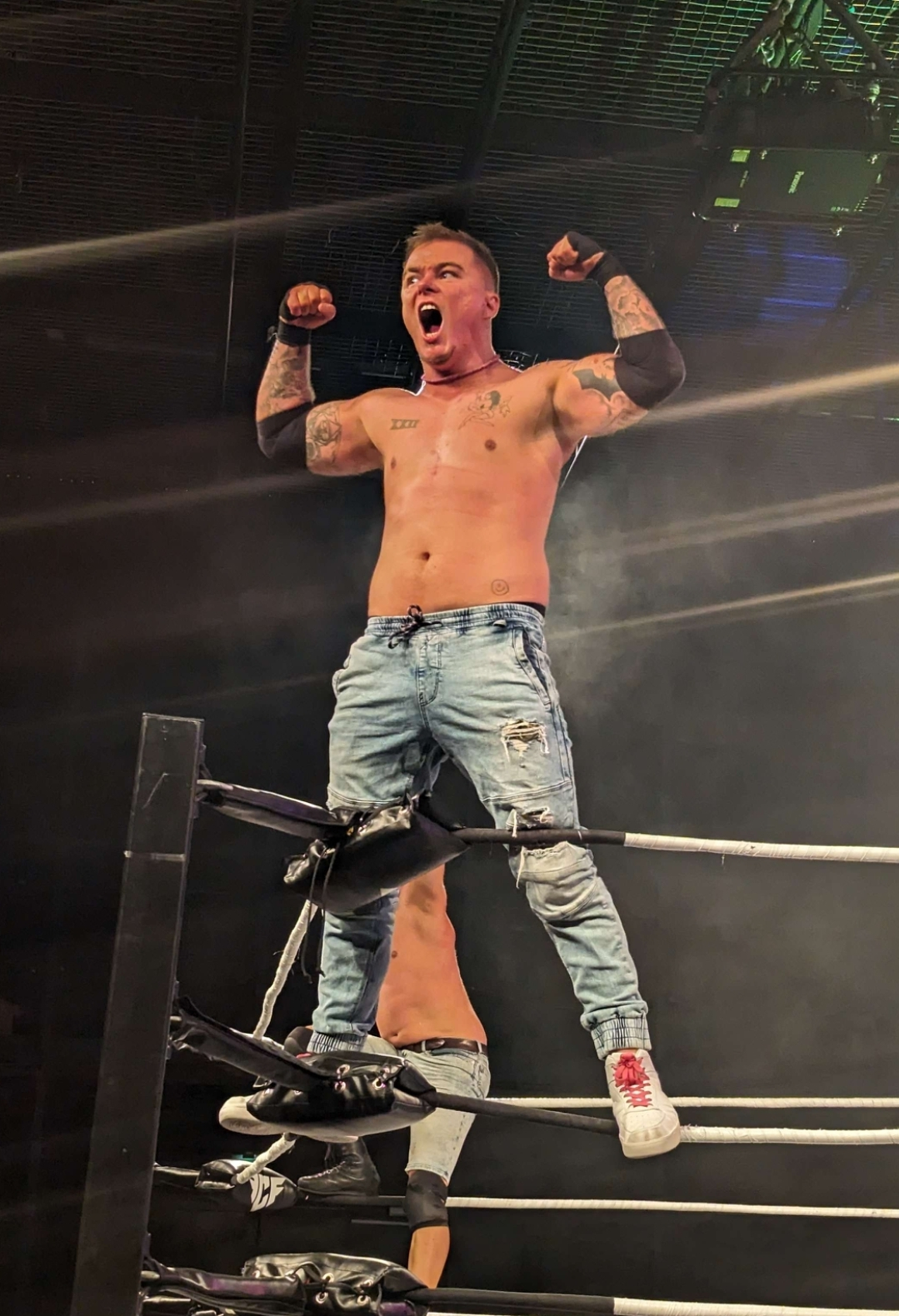
Jake Luupää

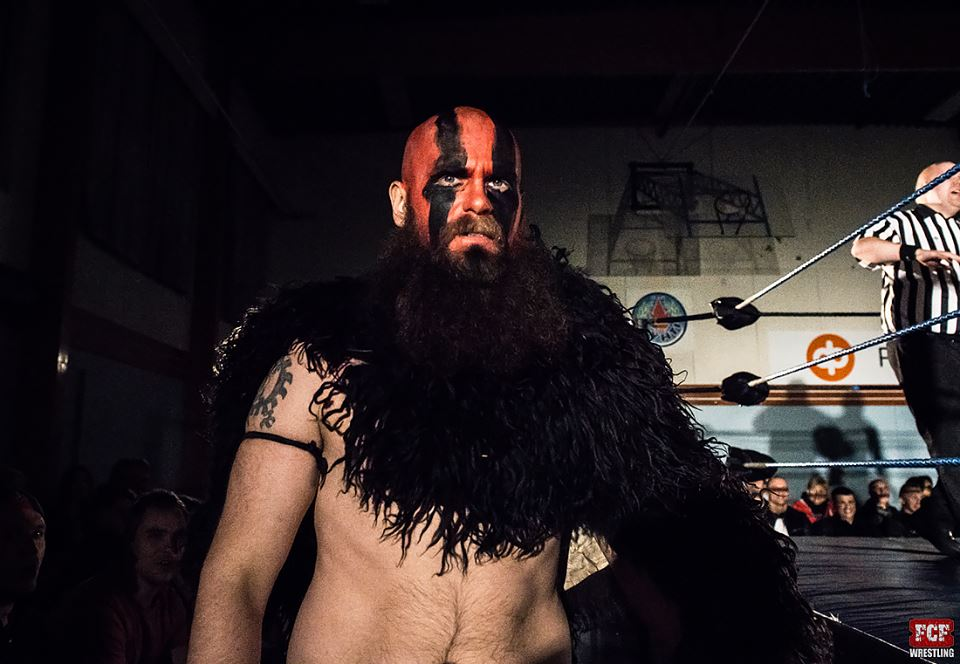
Heimo Ukonselkä

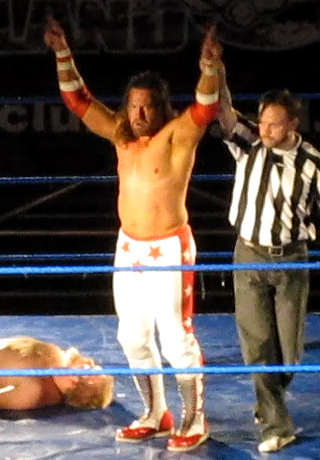
Michael Majalahti

=== Basketball ===
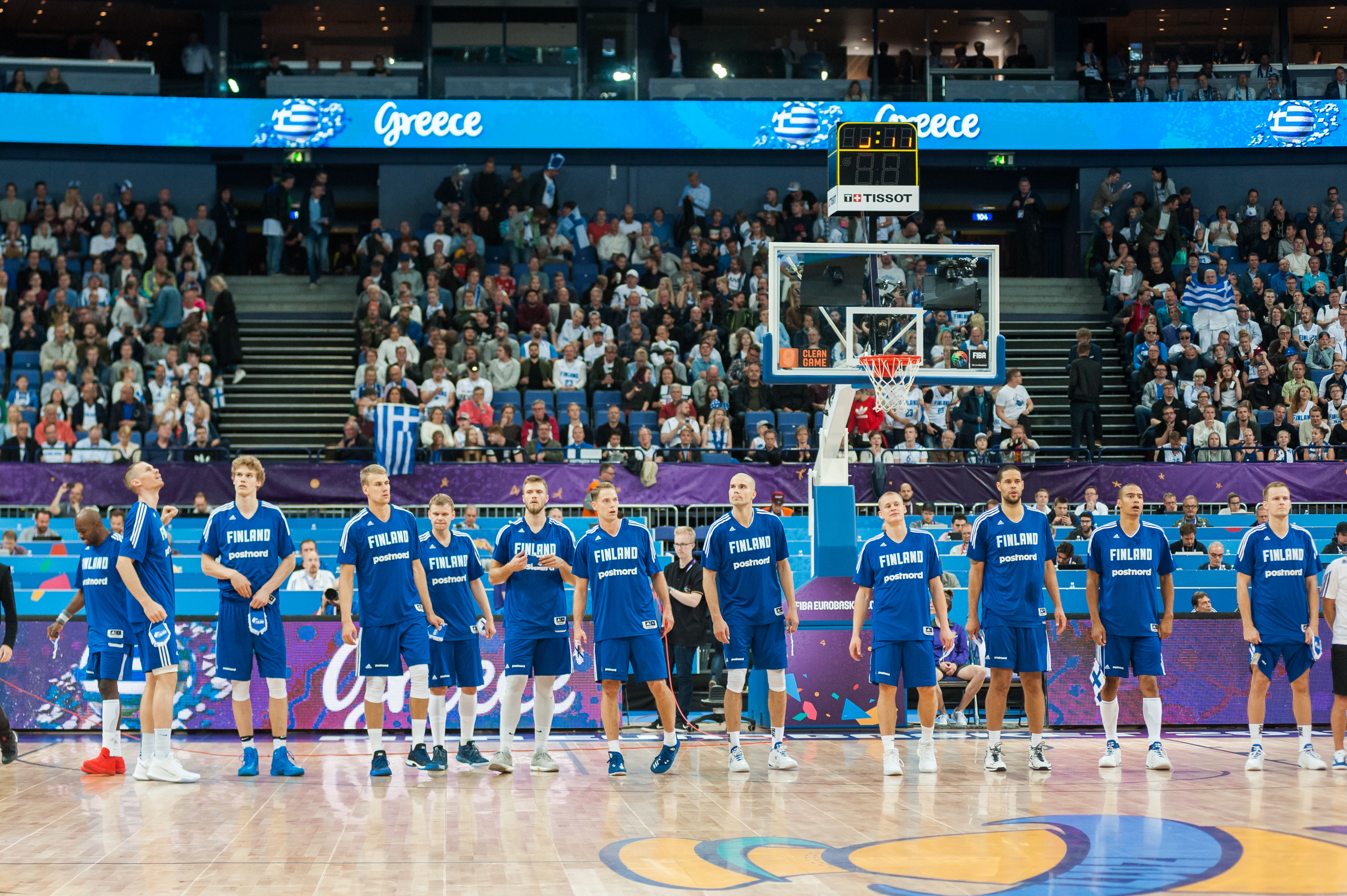
The Finnish basketball players at the 2017 European Championship before the game against Greece

As Finland appeared at the 2014 Basketball World Cup for the first time, the sport received a huge boost and major public attention. More than 8,000 basketball fans travelled to Spain to support their team. Overall, they booked more than 40 airplanes. For the second time, Finland made it in 2023 Basketball World Cup, for the first time through the qualifiers. Finland has hosted Men's EuroBasket in 1967 and co-hosted 2017 and 2025.

As in many countries worldwide, Finland has shown some major improvements in its professionalization of the game of basketball recently. Its Korisliiga sends teams to European competitions and has drawn the interest of an increasing number of talents especially from North America but also from Southeastern Europe.

Fiba Europe Cup in the 2022-23 season, Karhu Basket become the first Finnish club to advance to the final four.

=== Volleyball ===
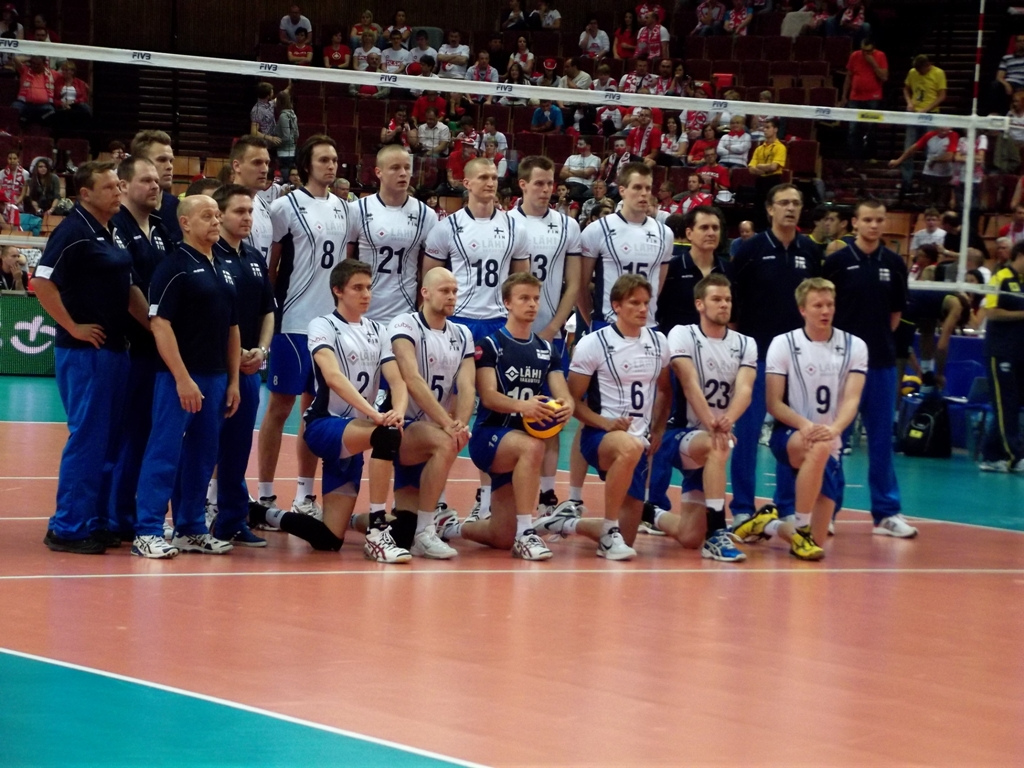
Finland national volleyball team in 2012.

- Finland men's national volleyball team has often participated in the EuroVolley Championships and succeeded steadily. the World Championships also made a comeback in 2014, challenging the big volleyball countries to finish in 9th place. Finland Volleyball League is highest level in Finland.

Finland featured a women's national team in beach volleyball that competed at the 2018–2020 CEV Beach Volleyball Continental Cup.

=== Disc golf ===
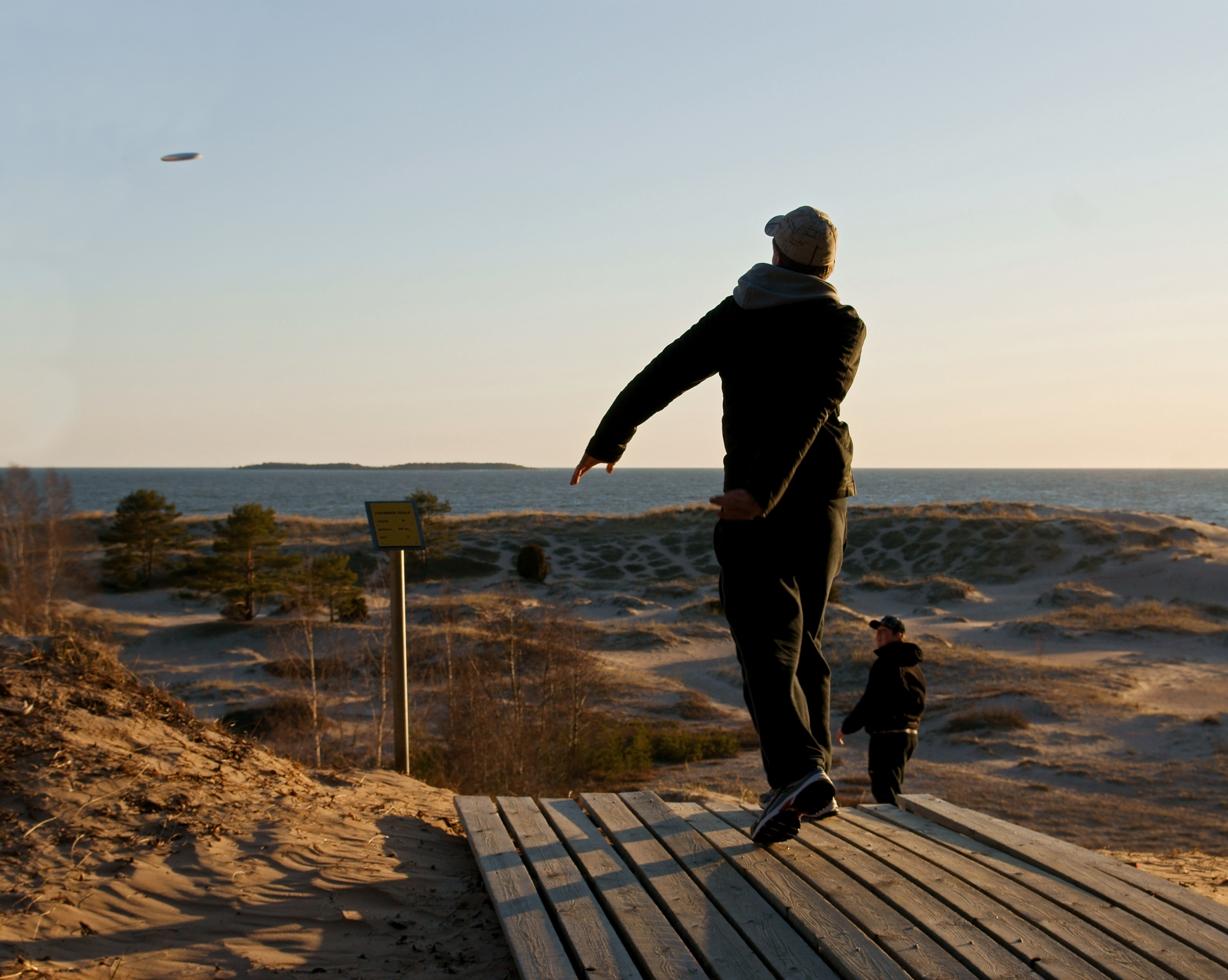
Disc golfers at the now-defunct Yyteri beach course at sunset in Pori

Disc golf is the fastest growing sport in Finland. According to the Finnish Research Institute for Olympic Sports (KIHU), it is more popular among Finns than ball golf, volleyball, basketball and tennis. As of June 2020, there are approximately 700 disc golf courses in Finland.

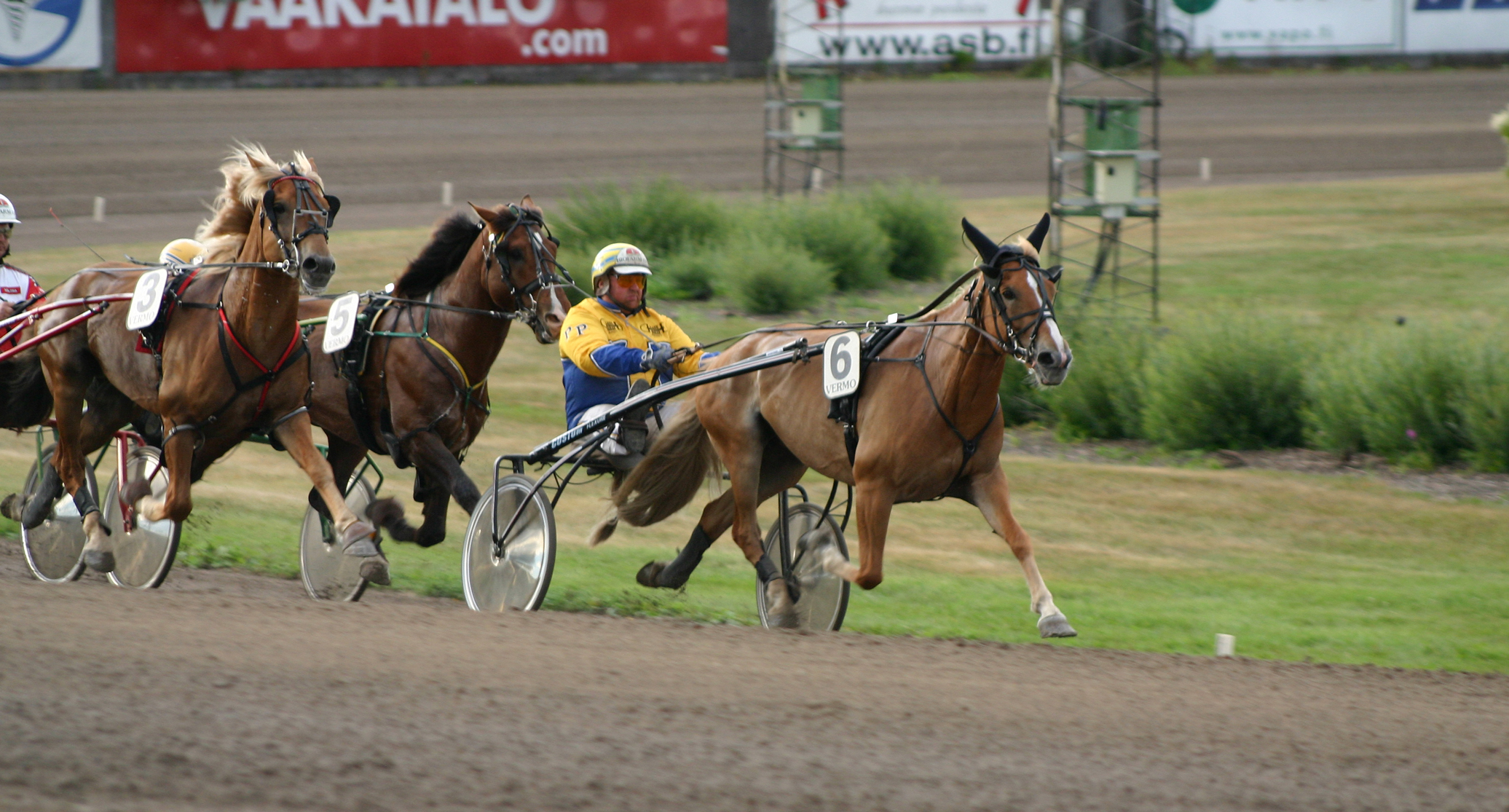
Pertti Puikkonen driving two-time Ravikuningatar title winner I.P. Vipotiina at Finland's main race track in Vermo.

=== Harness racing ===
Harness racing in Finland is characterised by the use of the coldblood breed Finnhorse along with modern light trotters such as the Standardbred. In lack of gallop racing culture, harness racing is the main equestrian sport in Finland. Horses used for harness racing in Finland are exclusively trotters.

Racing back home from church had been a tradition long before the first organised race was held in 1817. Modern racing started in the 1960s, when light breeds were allowed to enter the sport and Parimutuel betting gained foothold as pastime. Nowadays harness racing remains popular, with the main events gathering tens of thousands of spectators in the country with a population of some 5 million.

=== Sport shooting ===
The Finnish Shooting Sport Federation is the umbrella organization for sport shooting in Finland.

=== Tennis ===
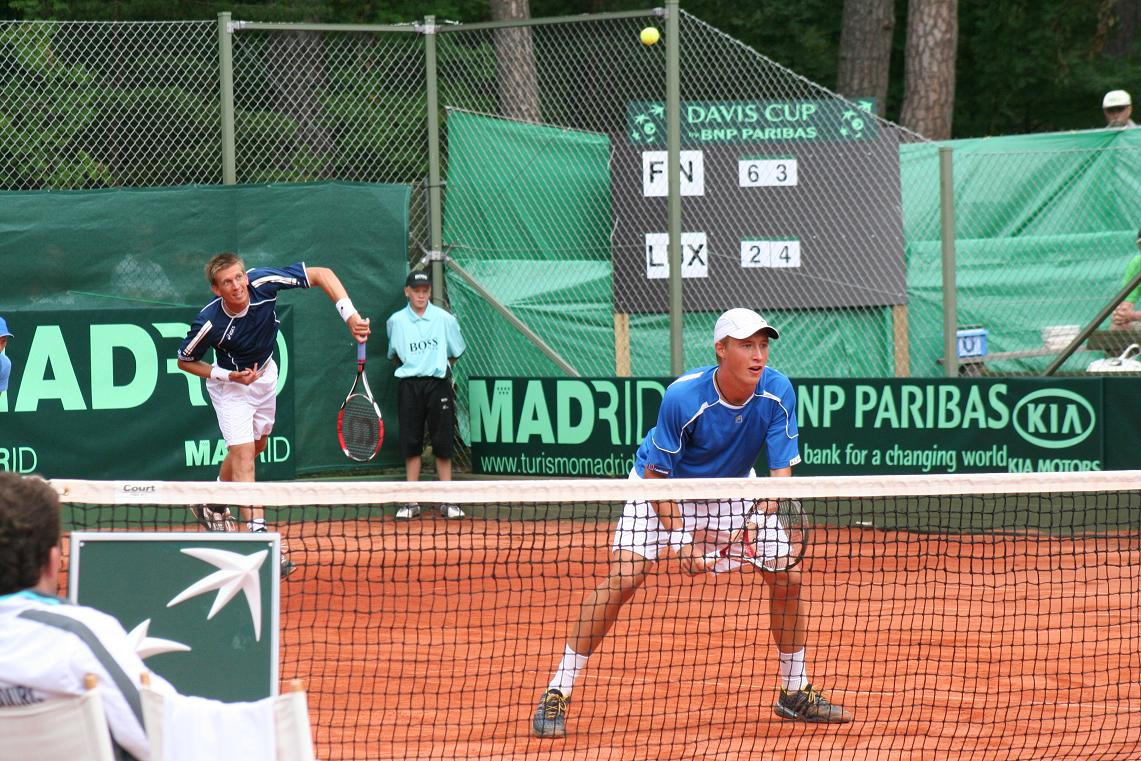
Jarkko Nieminen (left) and Henri Kontinen playing Davis Cup double against Luxemburg in 2008

Tennis came to Finland in 1881. The first club was Wiborgs lawntennisklubb, founded in 1898. The Finnish Tennis Federation was founded in 1911, and it immediately joined the international tennis federation. The first Finnish championship was won in 1912 by Boris Schildt. in 2023 Finnish team advanced to the Davis Cup final tournament for the first time and knocking out 32-time champions USA to reach the quarter-finals for the first time. Henri Kontinen has involved in winning Wimbledon Championships – Mixed doubles and Australian Open – Men's doubles, Harri Heliövaara has involved in winning US Open – Mixed doubles. Jarkko Nieminen is the highest-ranked Finnish tennis player ever in the world and the only Finn to win an ATP singles tournament.

=== Skittles sports ===
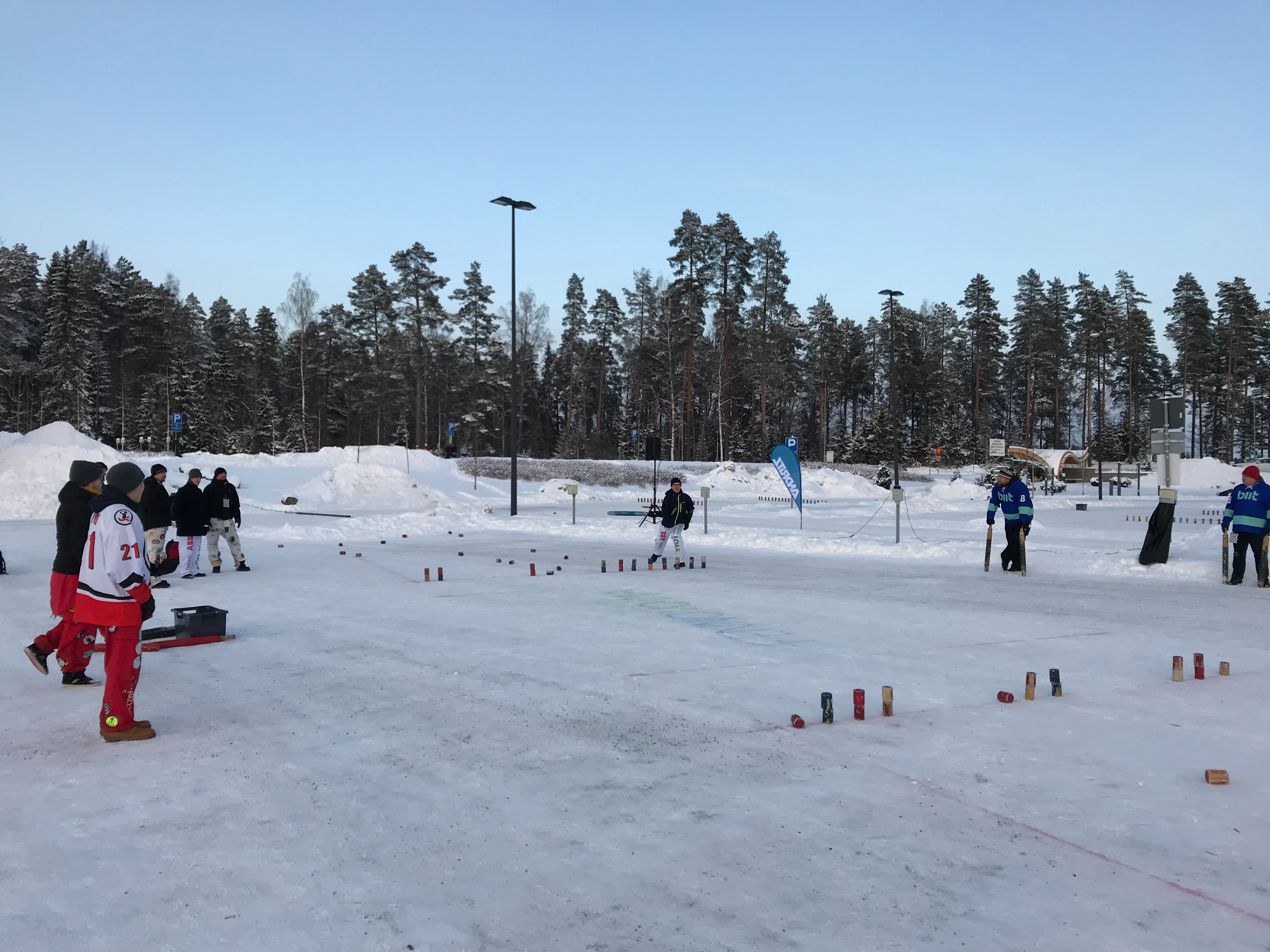
Kyykkä playing in the winter time

Finnish skittles (Kyykkä), is a centuries-old game of Karelian origin. Mölkky is modern version of Kyykkä.

=== Cue sports ===
Kaisa or karoliina is a cue sport mainly played in Finland and its the most traditional form of billiards in Finland and has been practiced in Finland for several decades before the birth of Finnish billiards association. The sport is still popular in Finland, and 20–30 tournaments under the Finnish Billiards Association are organized every year. In addition to the main series, there are different series, Seniors and Juniors.

=== Other Sports ===
- Hobby horsing
- Swamp football
- Mobile phone throwing
- Wife-carrying
- Box lacrosse, European Box Lacrosse Championships
- Handball, Finnish Handball League, Finland men's national handball team
- Ball hockey, Finland men's national ball hockey team
- Field hockey, Finland men's national field hockey team
- Sledge hockey, Finland men's national ice sledge hockey team
- Strength athletics, Strength athletics in Finland
- Water Polo, Playing water polo in Finland started in 1901, and the Finnish championship was played for the first time in 1908.
- Winter swimming, Winter Swimming World Championships
- Mountain bike orienteering, World Mountain Bike Orienteering Championships
- Ski orienteering, World Ski Orienteering Championships

== Controversies ==
Arto Halonen made a documentary about doping in sport in Finnish winter sports in 2012. Janne Immonen, Jari Isometsä and Harri Kirvesniemi were convicted in October 2013 by the Helsinki District Court.

== International championships hosted by Finland ==
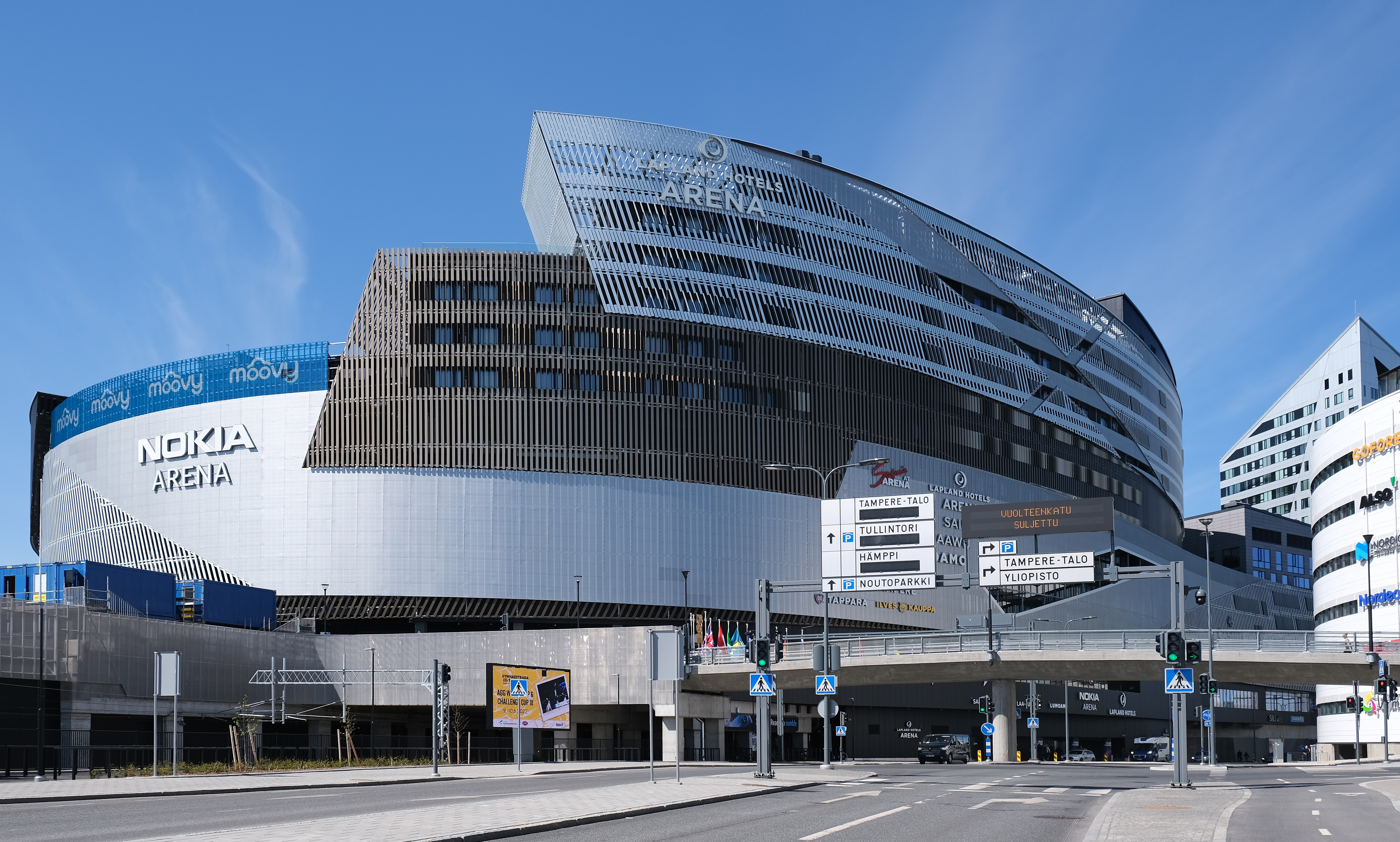
Nokia Arena

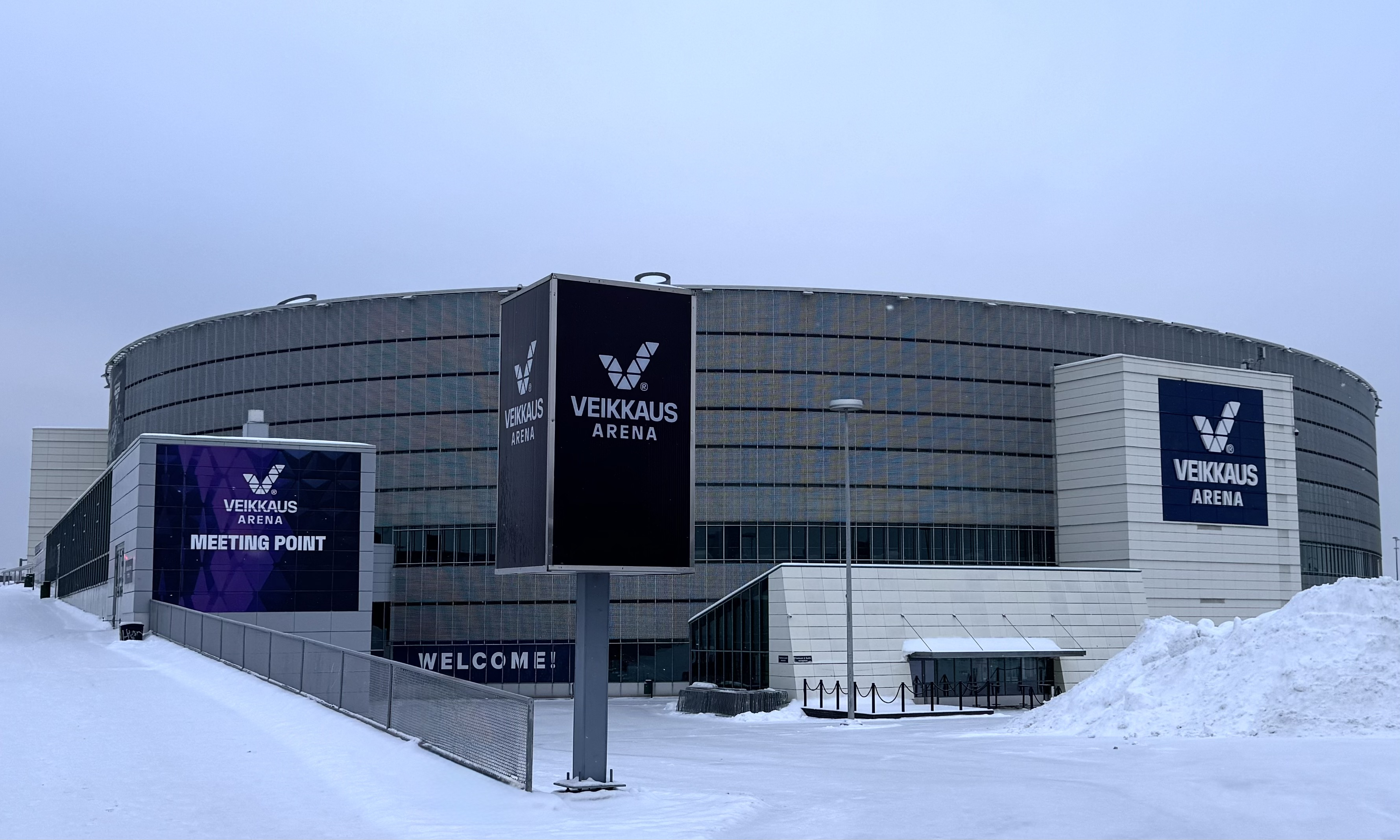
Veikkaus Arena

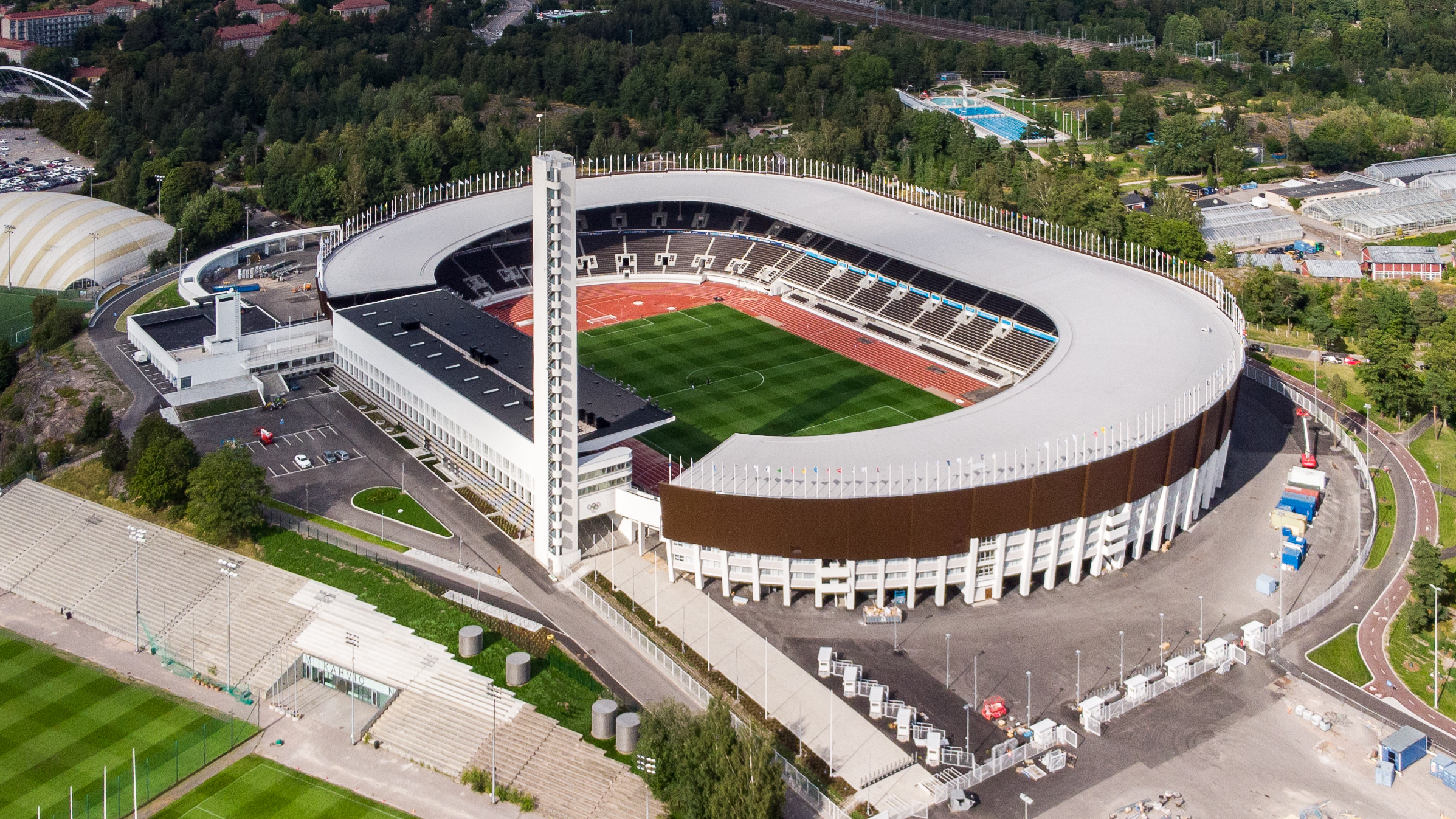
Helsinki Olympic Stadium

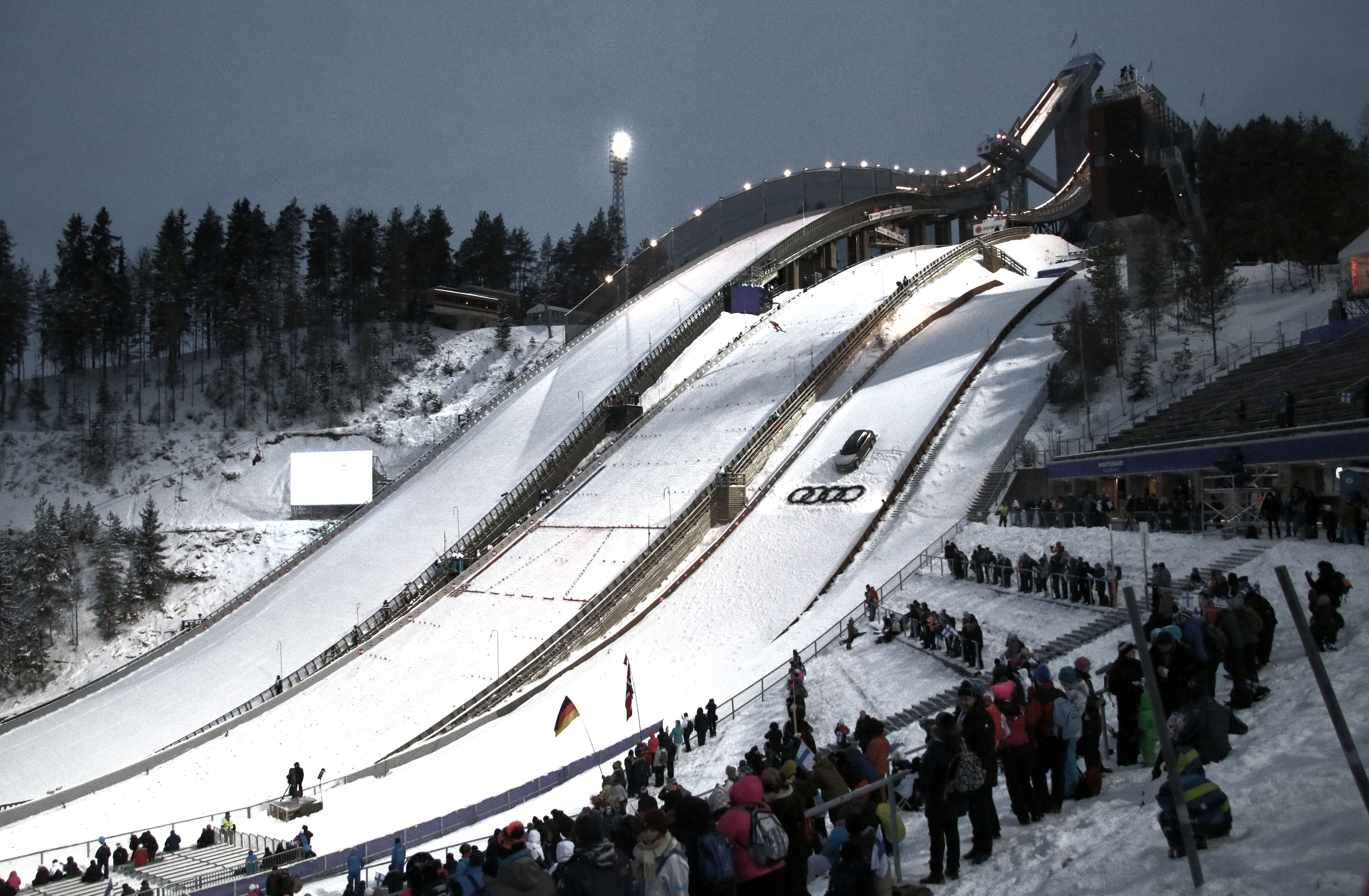
Salpausselkä (ski jumping centre)

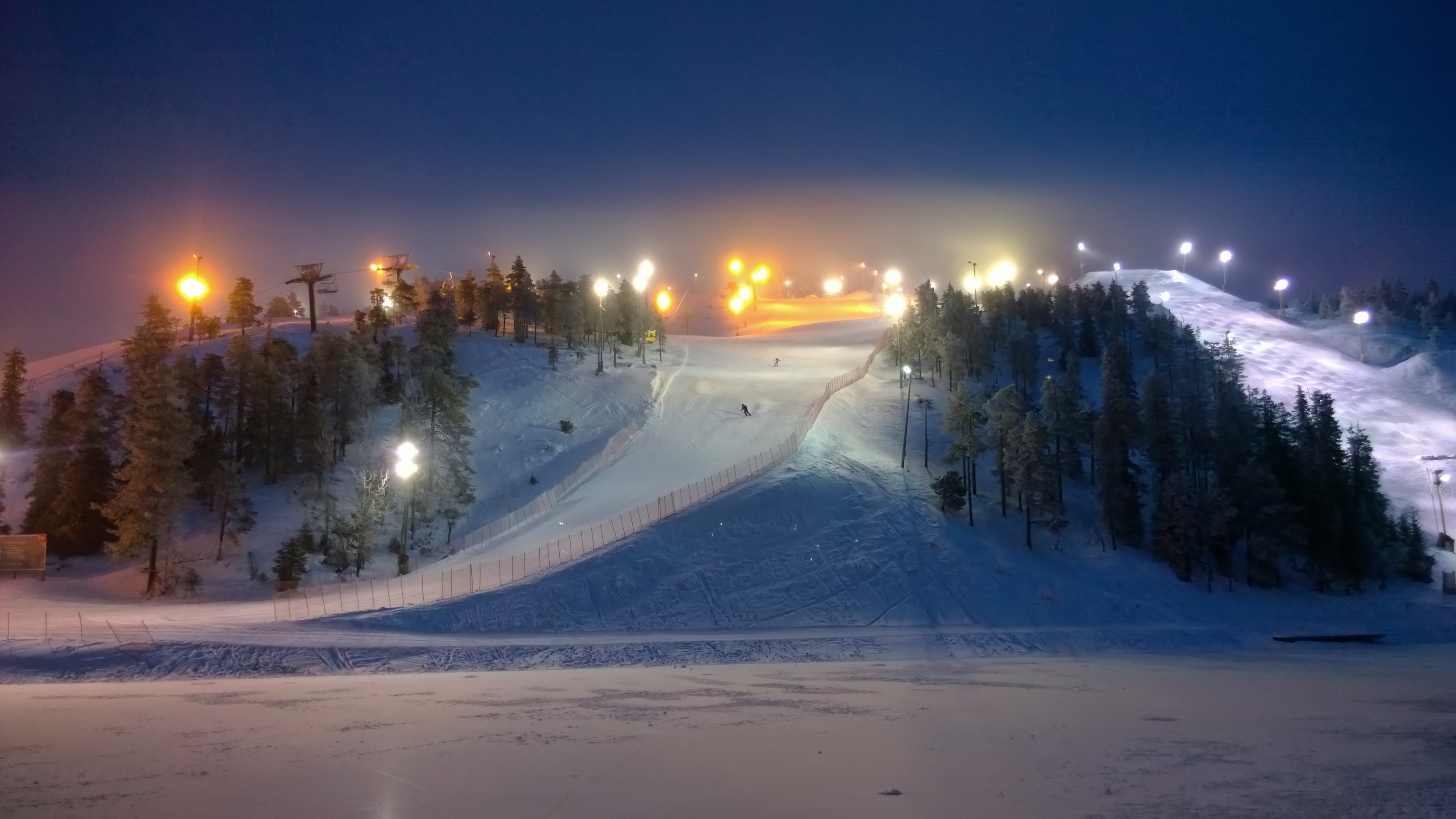
Rukatunturi

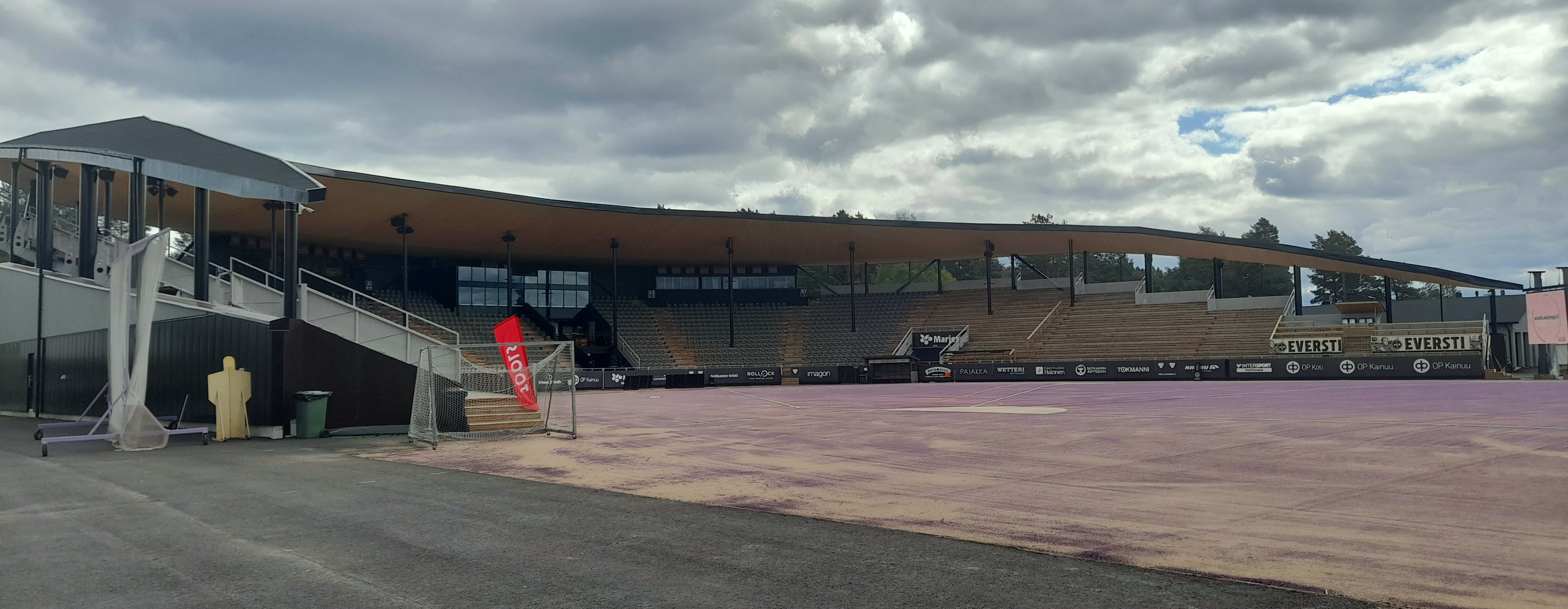
Hiukka Stadium

Year	Championship	Venue(es)
1926	Nordic World Ski Championships	Lahti
1933	European Wrestling Championships (Greco-Roman style)	Helsinki
1938	Nordic World Ski Championships	Lahti
1952	Summer Olympics	Helsinki
1957	Bandy World Championship	Helsinki
1958	Nordic World Ski Championships	Lahti
1962	Biathlon World Championships	Hämeenlinna
1965	World Ice Hockey Championships	Tampere
1967	Bandy World Championship	Helsinki, Oulu, Varkaus, Mikkeli, Lappeenranta
1967	FIBA European Championship	Helsinki, Tampere
1971	Biathlon World Championships	Hämeenlinna
1971	European Athletics Championships	Helsinki
1974	Ice Hockey World Championships	Helsinki
1975	Bandy World Championship	Espoo, Imatra, Kemi, Lappeenranta, Mikkeli, Oulu, Tornio, Varkaus
1976	World Junior Ice Hockey Championships	Tampere, Turku, Pori, Rauma
1977	Women's European Volleyball Championship	Tampere, Turku, Lahti, Kotka
1977	European Volleyball Championship	Helsinki, Tampere, Turku, Oulu
1978	Nordic World Ski Championships	Lahti
1980	World Junior Ice Hockey Championships	Helsinki, Vantaa
1981	Biathlon World Championships	Lahti
1982	World Ice Hockey Championships	Helsinki, Tampere
1982	UEFA European Under-18 Championship	Helsinki
1982	FIBA U16 Women's European Championship	Forssa, Uusikaupunki
1983	Bandy World Championship	Helsinki, Porvoo
1984	Nordic World Ski Championships	Rovaniemi (co-host)
1985	World Junior Ice Hockey Championships	Helsinki, Turku, Vantaa
1987	Biathlon World Championships	Lahti (co-host)
1987	European U18 Ice Hockey Championships	Tampere, Kouvola, Hämeenlinna
1989	Nordic World Ski Championships	Lahti
1990	World Junior Ice Hockey Championships	Helsinki, Turku, Kauniainen, Kerava
1990	Biathlon World Championships	Kontiolahti (co-host)
1991	Biathlon World Championships	Lahti
1991	Ice Hockey World Championships	Turku, Tampere, Helsinki
1992	Women's Ice Hockey World Championship	Tampere
1993	European Volleyball Championship	Oulu, Turku
1994	European Athletics Championships	Helsinki
1997	World Ice Hockey Championships	Helsinki, Tampere, Turku
1997	European Wrestling Championships (Greco-Roman style)	Kouvola
1998	Ice Hockey World Junior Championship	Helsinki, Hämeenlinna
1999	Women's Ice Hockey World Championship	Espoo, Vantaa
1999	Biathlon World Championships	Kontiolahti
2000	European Aquatics Championships	Helsinki
2001	Ice Hockey World U18 Championship	Helsinki, Heinola, Lahti
2001	Nordic World Ski Championships	Lahti
2001	European Youth Olympic Winter Festival	Vuokatti
2001	UEFA European Under-18 Championship	Helsinki
2003	Ice Hockey World Championship	Helsinki, Tampere, Turku
2004	Ice Hockey World Junior Championship	Hämeenlinna, Helsinki
2005	World Athletics Championships	Helsinki
2007	Ice Hockey World U18 Championship	Tampere, Rauma
2009	UEFA Women's European Championship	Helsinki, Lahti, Tampere, Turku
2009	European Youth Olympic Summer Festival	Tampere
2010	World Ringette Championships	Tampere
2012	Ice Hockey World Championship	Helsinki (co-host)
2012	European Athletics Championships	Helsinki
2013	Ice Hockey World Championship	Helsinki (co-host)
2014	European Wrestling Championships	Vantaa
2014	Ice Hockey World U18 Championship	Lappeenranta, Imatra
2015	Biathlon World Championships	Kontiolahti
2016	Ice Hockey World Junior Championship	Helsinki
2016	FIBA U20 European Championship	Helsinki
2016	World Ringette Championships	Helsinki
2017	Nordic World Ski Championships	Lahti
2017	FIBA European Championship	Helsinki (co-host)
2018	UEFA European Under-19 Championship	Seinäjoki, Vaasa
2018	European Championship of American football	Vantaa
2019	Women's Ice Hockey World Championship	Espoo
2021	European Volleyball Championship	Tampere (co-host)
2022	European Youth Olympic Winter Festival	Vuokatti
2022	Ice Hockey World Championship	Tampere, Helsinki
2023	Ice Hockey World Championship	Tampere (co-host)
2024	Ice Hockey World U18 Championship	Espoo, Vantaa
2024	FIBA U18 European Championship	Tampere
2025	FIBA European Championship	Tampere (co-host)
2026	Bandy World Championship	Pori
2026	European Volleyball Championship	Tampere (co-host)
2026	Floorball World Championship	Tampere
2027	Women's FIBA European Championship	Espoo (co-host)
2028	Ice Hockey World Junior Championship	Tampere, Turku
2029	Nordic World Ski Championships	Lahti
2030	Ice Hockey World Championship	Helsinki (co-host)
2030	European Athletics Championships	Helsinki

== See also ==
- Finland at the Olympics
- The Flying Finns
- Sportspersons on List of Finns
- Finnish Wheelchair Curling Championship
