= 1985 Bandy World Championship =

14th Bandy World Championship

Tournament details
- Host country: Norway
- Dates: 3–10 February
- Teams: 8

Final positions
- Champions: Soviet Union (12th title)
- Runners-up: Sweden
- Third place: Finland
- Fourth place: Norway

Tournament statistics
- Games played: 12
- Goals scored: 72 (6 per game)

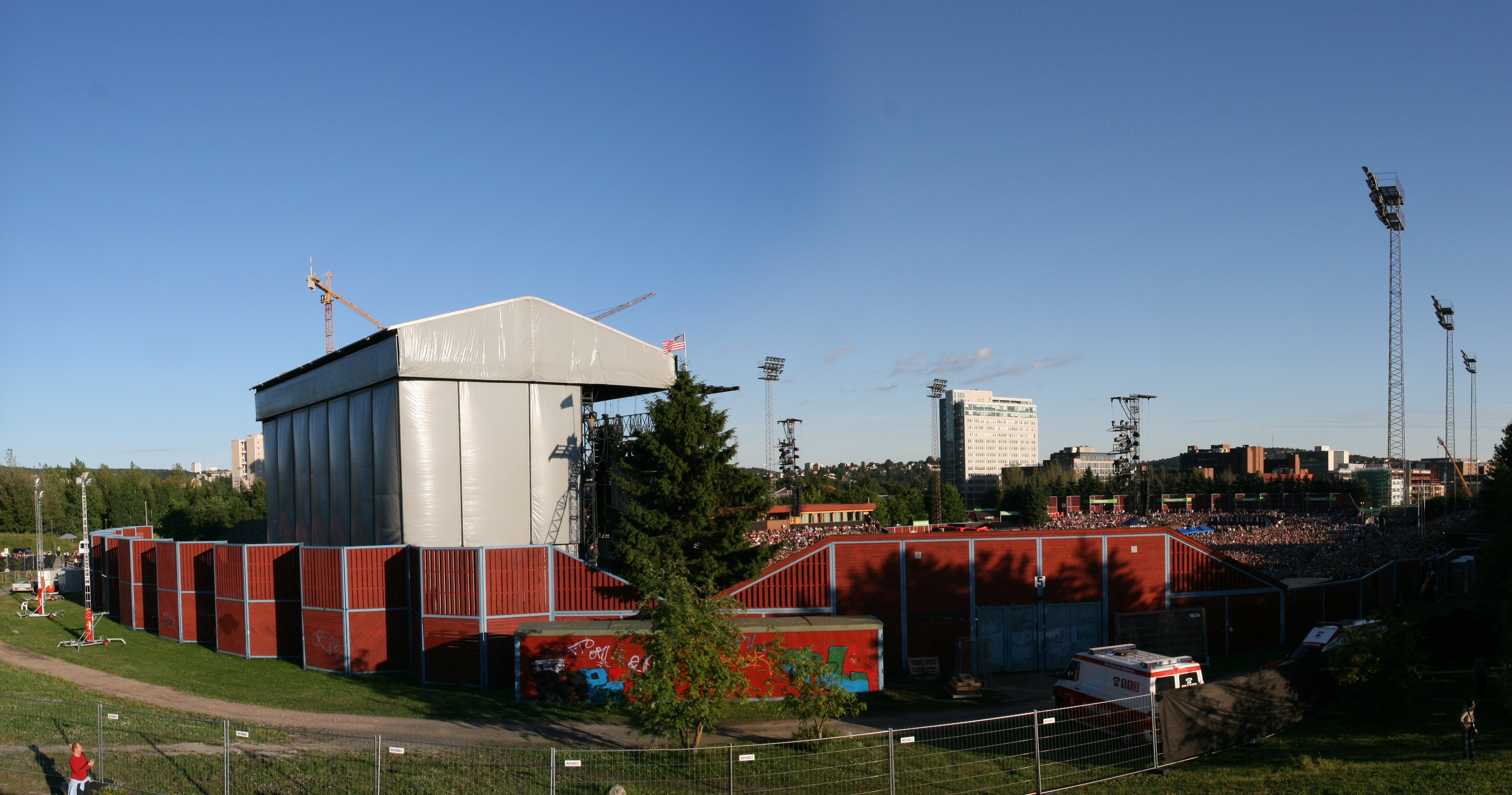
The main arena, Valle Hovin

The 1985 Bandy World Championship was the 14th Bandy World Championship and was contested by five men's bandy playing nations, more than ever before, as the United States entered the championship for the first time. The championship was played in Norway from 3 to 10 February 1985. The Soviet Union became champions.

== Qualified nations ==
- Soviet Union
- Finland
- Sweden
- Norway
- United States

== Preliminary Round ==
All times are local (UTC+1).

Pos	Team	Pld	W	D	L	GF	GA	GD	Pts
1	Soviet Union	4	3	1	0	17	3	+14	7
2	Sweden	4	2	2	0	28	5	+23	6
3	Finland	4	1	2	1	14	13	+1	4
4	Norway (H)	4	1	1	2	10	20	−10	3
5	United States	4	0	0	4	3	31	−28	0

Source: 1985 WCS MEN – RESULTS
(H) Hosts
3 February 1985
14:00

Soviet Union	5-1	Finland
Leonid Lobachev 33'; Aleksandr Tsyganov 40', 42', 51'; Vitaly Anufriyenko 57'		No Match Data

Marienlyst, Drammen
Attendance: 300
Referee: (Norway) Trüver, (Norway) Kjell Olsen

3 February 1985
-

Norway	5-1	United States
Kjetil Hannar Jensen 3', 59'; Dag Vidar Kristoffersen 52', 72'; Helge Moen 62'		Dave Reichel 47'

Marienlyst, Drammen
Attendance: 400
Referee: -

4 February 1985
-

Norway	4-4	Finland
Helge Moen 12'; Dag Vidar Kristoffersen 17'; Oddmar Nilsen 74'; Hauge† 74'		Timo Serenius 4'; Jukka Ohtonen 10'; Leo Segerman 22', 66'

Nedre Eiker, Mjøndalen
Attendance: 700
Referee: (Sweden) Tunman, (Sweden) R. Andersson, (Soviet Union) V. Kuznetsov, (Soviet Union) Glebov

4 February 1985
-

Soviet Union	1-1	Sweden
Sergei Lomanov 21'		-†† >45'

Nordre Åsen, Oslo
Attendance: -
Referee: -

5 February 1985
-

Sweden	12-1	United States
Bengt Ramström 1', 30', 80'; Ola Jahansson 2'; Mikael Arvidsson 3', 81', 85'; Urban Andersson 17'; M. Reichel 57' o.g; Christer Kjellqvist 65', 79', 87'		Wood 51'

Haslumbanen, Bærum
Attendance: 300
Referee: -

6 February 1985
-

Norway	1-3	Soviet Union
No Match Data		No Match Data

Solbergbanen, Solbergelva
Attendance: -
Referee: (Sweden) R. Andersson, (Sweden) Jamsen, (Finland) T. Fager, (Finland) Tunman

7 February 1985
17:00

Finland	6-1	United States
Ilkka Alatalo 10', 62'; Juha Niemikorpi 24'; Pekka Vartiainen 33', 82'; Leo Segerman 71'		Dave Reichel 56'

Ullernbanen, Oslo
Attendance: -
Referee: -

7 February 1985
19:00

Norway	0-12	Sweden
		Hans-Elis Johansson 36', 80', 88'; Joe Lönngren 38'; Kenth Hultqvist 45'; Bengt Ramström 53', 75', 77'; Mikael Arvidsson 70', 89'; Lars Ångström 85'; - <90'

Stabekkbanen, Stabekk
Attendance: 750
Referee: (Norway) Trüver, (Norway) Kjell Olsen

8 February 1985
-

Sweden	3-3	Finland
No Match Data		Kari Helin 4'; Jukka Ohtonen 6'; Leo Segerman 47'

Solbergbanen, Solbergelva
Attendance: -
Referee: -

8 February 1985
-

Soviet Union	8-0	United States
Aleksandr Tsyganov 6', 13'; - <45', <45', <45', <45', <45', >45'

Røa, Oslo
Attendance: 300
Referee: -

=== Final round ===
==== 3rd Place ====
10 February 1985
-

Norway	2-6	Finland
Odd Johnsen 73'; Dag Vidar Kristoffersen 87'		Leo Segerman 5', 9'; Jukka Ohtonen 16', 22'; Pekka Vartiainen 42'; Ikka Alatalo 59'

Valle Hovin, Oslo
Referee: (Sweden) Tunman, (Sweden) R. Andersson

==== Finals ====
10 February 1985
-

Soviet Union	5-4	Sweden
Aleksandr Tsyganov 5', 99', 113'; Sergei Lomanov 34'; Nikolai Pazdnikov 46'		Håkan Karlsson 11'; Sören Boström 21', 83', 119'

Valle Hovin, Oslo
Attendance: 1,500
Referee: (Norway) Kjell Olsen, (Norway) Trüver, (Finland) T. Fager, (Finland) Jamsen

=== Final ranking ===
Rank	Team
1st place, gold medalist(s)	Soviet Union
2nd place, silver medalist(s)	Sweden
3rd place, bronze medalist(s)	Finland
4	Norway
5	United States

=== Top Scorer ===
Scoring Leaders

- 6 Goals: (Sweden) Bengt Ramström
- 6 Goals: (Finland) Leo Segerman

=== Awards ===
Best players selected by the directorate:

- Best Goaltender: (Sweden) Anders Bridholm
- Best Defenceman: (Sweden) Joe Lönngren
- Best Midfielder: (Soviet Union) Vladimir Plavunov
- Best Forward: (Sweden) Bengt Ramström

†Either Håkon Hauge or Jan Hauge

††Either Håkan Karlsson or Hans-Elis Johansson
