= 1963 Bandy World Championship =

3rd Bandy World Championship

Tournament details
- Host country: Sweden
- Venues: 6 (in 6 host cities)
- Dates: 20–24 February
- Teams: 4

Final positions
- Champions: Soviet Union (3rd title)
- Runners-up: Finland
- Third place: Sweden
- Fourth place: Norway

Tournament statistics
- Games played: 6
- Goals scored: 41 (6.83 per game)

The 1963 Bandy World Championship was the third Bandy World Championship and was contested by four men's bandy playing nations. The championship was played in Sweden from 20 to 24 February 1963. The Soviet Union became champions.

== Qualified nations ==
- Soviet Union
- Finland
- Sweden
- Norway

== Tournament ==
All times are local (UTC+1).

Pos	Team	Pld	W	D	L	GF	GA	GD	Pts
1	Soviet Union	3	3	0	0	22	2	+20	6
2	Sweden (H)	3	1	0	2	12	9	+3	2
3	Finland	3	1	1	1	4	8	−4	3
4	Norway	3	0	1	2	3	22	−19	1

Source: 1963 WCS MEN – RESULTS
(H) Hosts
20 February 1963
-

Soviet Union	6-1	Finland
Yevgeny Papugin 23', 33', 49'; Valentin Atamanychev 48'; Yuri Shorin 62'; Mikhail Osintev 80'		Pertti Tammilehto 86'

Skogsvallen, Nässjö
Attendance: 3,079
Referee: (Norway) F. Jensen, (Norway) H. Larsen

20 February 1963
-

Sweden	12-0	Norway
Leif Fredblad <90', <90', <90', <90'; Bernt Eriksson <90', <90', <90', <90'; Göran Sedvall <90', <90', <90', <90'

Karlstad
Attendance: 2,409
Referee: -

22 February 1963
-

Soviet Union	8-1	Norway
Yuri Varzin 1', 66'; Yevgeny Papugin 33', 65'; Valery Maslov 37'; Nikolai Durakov 56', 68'; Valentin Atamanychev 80'		Bernt Skarnæs 60'

Backavallen, Katrineholm
Attendance: 3,477
Referee: (Sweden) I. Johansson, (Sweden) A. Jansson

22 February 1963
-

Sweden	0-1	Finland
		Pauli Heiskanen <45'

Uppsala
Attendance: 4,577
Referee: -

24 February 1963
-

Norway	2-2	Finland
No Match Data		Rauno Ruotsalainen <90'; Olavi Varma <90'

Västerås
Attendance: 430
Referee: -

24 February 1963
-

Sweden	0-8	Soviet Union
		Valentin Atamanychev 17', 73', 90'; Nikolai Durakov 32', 39'; Yuri Varzin 50', 67'; Mikhail Osintsev 55'

Stockholm Olympic Stadium, Stockholm
Attendance: 5,430
Referee: (Finland) K. Söderberg, (Finland) M. Hirviniemi

=== Final ranking ===
Rank	Team
1st place, gold medalist(s)	Soviet Union
2nd place, silver medalist(s)	Finland
3rd place, bronze medalist(s)	Sweden
4	Norway

=== Top Scorer ===
Scoring Leaders

- 5 Goals: (Soviet Union) Valentin Atamanychev
- 5 Goals: (Soviet Union) Evgeny Papguin
