= Inge Thun =

Norwegian footballer and bandy player (1945-2008)

Personal information
- Date of birth: 17 June 1945
- Place of birth: Drammen, Norway
- Date of death: 15 February 2008 (aged 62)
- Place of death: Drammen, Norway
- Position: Goalkeeper

Youth career
- Strømsgodset IF

Senior career*
Years	Team	Apps	(Gls)
1963–1977	Strømsgodset IF	329	(0)

International career
1968–1974	Norway	4	(0)
- * Club domestic league appearances and goals

Inge Thun (17 June 1945 − 15 February 2008) was a Norwegian football goalkeeper and bandy winger who played for Strømsgodset IF in both sports. He finished his football career with a few seasons across the river at Drammens Ballklubb.

He won the Norwegian football league with Strømsgodset in 1970 as well the Cup in 1969, 1970 and 1973. He also became Norwegian bandy champion six times with Strømsgodset and won a silver medal in the 1965 Bandy World Championship with the national team.

Thun became famous in England when his team lost 0-11 to Liverpool in the 1975 Cup Winners' Cup.

Inge Thun died on 15 February 2008, after suffering a stroke.
