= 1977 Bandy World Championship =

10th Bandy World Championship

Tournament details
- Host country: Norway
- Dates: 23–30 January
- Teams: 4

Final positions
- Champions: Soviet Union (10th title)
- Runners-up: Sweden
- Third place: Finland
- Fourth place: Norway

Tournament statistics
- Games played: 12
- Goals scored: 83 (6.92 per game)

The 1977 Bandy World Championship was the tenth Bandy World Championship and was contested by four men's bandy playing nations. The championship was played in Norway from 23 to 30 January 1977. The Soviet Union became champions.

== Qualified nations ==
- Soviet Union
- Finland
- Sweden
- Norway

== Tournament ==
All times are local (UTC+1).

Pos	Team	Pld	W	D	L	GF	GA	GD	Pts
1	Soviet Union	6	5	0	1	31	13	+18	10
2	Sweden	6	3	0	3	22	14	+8	6
3	Finland	6	2	0	4	18	28	−10	4
4	Norway (H)	6	2	0	4	12	28	−16	4

Source: 1977 WCS MEN – RESULTS
(H) Hosts
23 January 1977
-

Norway	1-5	Finland
No Match Data		No Match Data

Marienlyst, Drammen
Attendance: 341
Referee: -

23 January 1977
-

Soviet Union	2-3	Sweden
Georgy Kanareykin 4'; Vladimir Plavunov 62'		Bernt Eriksson 37'; Sören Boström 42', 54'

Valle Hovin, Oslo
Attendance: 718
Referee: (Finland) K. Ruutu, (Finland) T. Ruutu

24 January 1977
14:45

Norway	3-1	Sweden
No Match Data		No Match Data

Stabekkbanen, Stabekk
Attendance: 1,700
Referee: -

24 January 1977
-

Soviet Union	4-3	Finland
Vladimir Plavunov 5'; Valery Eikhvald 26', 33', 61'		Veikko Niemikorpi 72', 77'; Pekka Vartiainen 82'

Gulskogen idrettspark, Drammen
Attendance: 615
Referee: (Sweden) H. Viklund, (Sweden) L. Pettersson

26 January 1977
19:00

Finland	2-1	Sweden
No Match Data		No Match Data

Nadderud, Bærum
Attendance: 548
Referee: (Norway) P. Viborg-Jensen, (Norway) P. E. Johansen, (Soviet Union) Zhivlyuk, (Soviet Union) Krylov

26 January 1977
-

Soviet Union	8-1	Norway
Georgy Kanareykin 13'; Valery Eikhvald 31', 33'; Vaerly Maslov 54', 63'; Yuri Lizavin 76'; Sergei Lomanov 79'; Vladimir Yanko 90'		Rune Bråthen 62'

Skeid, Nordre Åsen
Attendance: -
Referee: (Finland) K. Ruutu, (Finland) T. Ruutu

27 January 1977
-

Norway	2-6	Sweden
No Match Data		No Match Data

Skeid, Nordre Åsen
Attendance: 800
Referee: -

27 January 1977
-

Soviet Union	8-3	Finland
Georgy Kanareykin 26', 36'; Valery Bochkov 48'; Sergei Lomanov 49', 74'; Yuri Lizavin 66', 82'; Valery Maslov 84'		Eero Hamari 62', 87'; Pertti Härkönen 88'

Stabekkbanen, Stabekk
Attendance: 640
Referee: (Norway) P. Viborg-Jensen, (Norway) P. E. Johansen

29 January 1977
13:00

Norway	1-6	Soviet Union
Arve Johnsen 69'		Yuri Lizavin 20'; Sergei Lomanov 30', 40'; Valery Eikhvald 37', 41'; Valery Maslov 68'

Nedre Eiker, Mjøndalen
Attendance: 500
Referee: (Sweden) H. Viklund, (Sweden) L. Pettersson

29 January 1977
14:00

Sweden	9-3	Finland
No Match Data		No Match Data

Valle Hovin, Oslo
Attendance: 200
Referee: -

30 January 1977
11:00

Norway	4-2	Finland
Arve Johnsen 30', 40'; Helge Moen 33'; Rune Bråthen >40'		- <90', <90'

Nadderud, Bærum
Attendance: 350
Referee: -

30 January 1977
-

Soviet Union	3-2	Sweden
Yuri Lizavin 20'; Georgy Kanareykin 49'; Vladimir Plavunov 67'		Håkan Olsson 12'; Bernt Eriksson 42'

Marienlyst, Drammen
Attendance: 250
Referee: (Norway) P. Viborg-Jensen, (Norway) P. E. Johansen

=== Final ranking ===
Rank	Team
1st place, gold medalist(s)	Soviet Union
2nd place, silver medalist(s)	Sweden
3rd place, bronze medalist(s)	Finland
4	Norway

=== Top Scorer ===
Scoring Leaders

- 7 Goals: (Sweden) Bengt Ramström
- 7 Goals: (Soviet Union) Valery Eikhvald

=== Awards ===
Best players selected by the directorate:

- Best Goaltender: (Sweden) Tommy Axelsson
- Best Defenceman: (Soviet Union) Vladimir Plavunov
- Best Forward: (Sweden) Bengt Ramström
