= Valery Maslov =

Soviet footballer (1940–2017)

Valeri Maslov
Personal information
- Full name: Valeri Pavlovich Maslov
- Date of birth: 28 April 1940
- Place of birth: Ust-Bolsheretsk, Khabarovsk Krai, USSR
- Date of death: 27 July 2017 (aged 77)
- Place of death: Moscow, Russia
- Height: 1.72 m (5 ft 8 in)
- Position: Midfielder

Youth career
- Frezer Moscow
- Trud Zhukovskiy
- FShM Moscow
- Vympel Kaliningrad

Senior career*
Years	Team	Apps	(Gls)
1961	Vympel Kaliningrad		
1961–1971	Dynamo Moscow	319	(50)
1972	Dynamo Makhachkala		
1972–1973	FC Dynamo Vologda		

International career
1964, 1967	USSR	8	(2)

Managerial career
- 1981–1982: Spartak Ordzhonikidze (assistant)
- 1983: Spartak Ordzhonikidze
- 1986–1987: Lokomotiv Moscow (scout)
- 1989–1990: Sokol Saratov (assistant)
- 2001–2011: Lokomotiv Moscow (scout)
- 2004: FC Titan Moscow
- * Club domestic league appearances and goals

Valeri Pavlovich Maslov (Russian: Валерий Павлович Маслов; 28 April 1940 – 27 July 2017) was a Soviet football and bandy player.

== International career ==
Maslov made his debut for USSR football team on 20 May 1964 in a friendly against Uruguay. He played in the qualifiers for UEFA Euro 1968, but was not selected for the final tournament squad.

== Honours ==
=== Football ===
- Soviet Top League winner: 1963.
- Soviet Top League runner-up: 1962, 1967, 1970.
- Soviet Cup winner: 1967, 1970.

=== Bandy ===
Played for Trud Kaliningrad (1960–1961), Dynamo Moscow (1961–1979).

- Soviet Bandy League winner: 1963-1965, 1967, 1970, 1972, 1973, 1975, 1976, 1978.
- Soviet Bandy League runner-up: 1966, 1968, 1971, 1974, 1977.
- Soviet Bandy League bronze: 1962.
- Bandy Champions Cup winner: 1976, 1977, 1979.
- Bandy World Championship winner: 1961, 1963, 1965, 1967, 1971, 1973, 1975, 1977.
- Bandy World Championship best forward: 1973.
- Soviet Top forward: 1970, 1973.

=== Bandy (as a coach) ===
Coached Yunost Omsk (1987–1989), Stroitel Syktyvkar (1992–1997), Agrokhim Berezniki (1998–2000), Russian Under-21 national bandy team (1993–1996).

- Russian Bandy League runner-up: 1993.
- Bandy Under-21 World Championship winner: 1994.
