= 1967 Bandy World Championship =

5th Bandy World Championship

Tournament details
- Host country: Finland
- Dates: 14–19 February
- Teams: 4

Final positions
- Champions: Soviet Union (5th title)
- Runners-up: Finland
- Third place: Sweden
- Fourth place: Norway

Tournament statistics
- Games played: 6
- Goals scored: 24 (4 per game)

The 1967 Bandy World Championship was the fifth Bandy World Championship and was contested by four men's bandy playing nations. The championship was played in Finland from 14 to 19 February. The Soviet Union became champions.

== Qualified nations ==
- Soviet Union
- Finland
- Sweden
- Norway

== Tournament ==
All times are local (UTC+2).

Pos	Team	Pld	W	D	L	GF	GA	GD	Pts
1	Soviet Union	3	1	2	0	8	3	+5	4
2	Finland (H)	3	1	2	0	7	5	+2	4
3	Sweden	3	1	2	0	5	4	+1	4
4	Norway	3	0	0	3	4	12	−8	0

Source: 1965 WCS MEN – RESULTS
(H) Hosts
14 February 1967
-

Soviet Union	5-0	Norway
Valery Maslov 8'; Nikolai Durakov 12'; Yuri Shorin 28'; Mikhail Osintsev 67'; Yevgeny Papugin 80'

Pirkkola Sports Park, Helsinki
Attendance: 987
Referee: (Sweden) E. Boström, (Sweden) F. Johansson

14 February 1967
18:00

Sweden	1-1	Finland
Claes-Håkan Asklund <45'		Pauli Auvinen >45'

Kimpinen, Lappeenranta
Attendance: 3,467
Referee: (Soviet Union) Yuri Bocharov, (Soviet Union) Anatoly Shevlyuk

16 February 1967
19:00

Sweden	2-1	Norway
Claes-Håkan Asklund 1'; Jan Hermansson 65'		Kjell-Ivar Engebretsen 51'

Hänninkenttä, Mikkeli
Attendance: 1,421
Referee: (Finland) M. Hirviniemi, (Finland) L. Kosunen

16 February 1967
-

Soviet Union	1-1	Finland
Yevgeny Papugin 40'		Seppo Rounaja 43'

Raksila, Oulu
Attendance: 5,930
Referee: (Norway) L. Paulsen, (Norway) O. Undeli

18 February 1967
17:00

Finland	5-3	Norway
Seppo Rounaja 23', 75', 85'; Kalevi Pirkola 47', 80'		Alf Bråthen <45'; Bernt Skarnäs <45'; Inge Thun <45'

Kämäri, Varkaus
Attendance: 3,082
Referee: (Sweden) E. Boström, (Sweden) F. Johansson

19 February 1967
14:00

Soviet Union	2-2	Sweden
Nikolai Durakov 51'; Valery MAslov 52'		Jan Johansson 73'; Leif Fredblad 75'

Pirkkola Sports Park, Helsinki
Attendance: 687
Referee: (Finland) M. Hirviniemi, (Finland) T. Enckell

=== Final ranking ===
Rank	Team
1st place, gold medalist(s)	Soviet Union
2nd place, silver medalist(s)	Finland
3rd place, bronze medalist(s)	Sweden
4	Norway

=== Top Scorer ===
Scoring Leaders

- 4 Goals: (Finland) Seppo Rounaja
- 2 Goals: (Sweden) Claes-Håkan Asklund
- 2 Goals: (Soviet Union) Nikolai Durakov
- 2 Goals: (Soviet Union) Mikhail Osintsev
- 2 Goals: (Soviet Union) Eugene Papugin
- 2 Goals: (Finland) Kalevi Pirkola
- 1 Goals: (Finland) Pauli Auvinen
- 1 Goals: (Norway) Alf Bråthen
- 1 Goals: (Norway) Kjell-Ivar Engelbretsen
- 1 Goals: (Norway) Bernt Skarnäs
- 1 Goals: (Norway) Inge Thun
- 1 Goals: (Sweden) Leif Fredblad
- 1 Goals: (Sweden) Jan Hermansson
- 1 Goals: (Sweden) Benny Söderling
- 1 Goals: (Soviet Union) Valery Maslov
- 1 Goals: (Soviet Union) Viktor Rybin

=== Awards ===
Best players selected by the directorate:

- Best Goaltender: (Finland) Lars Näsman
- Best Defenceman: (Sweden) Matz-Allan Johansson
- Best Midfielder: (Soviet Union) Vyacheslav Solovev
- Best Forward: (Finland) Seppo Rounaja
