= 1981 Bandy World Championship =

XIIth Bandy World Championship

Tournament details
- Host country: Soviet Union
- City: Khabarovsk
- Dates: 7–15 February
- Teams: 4

Final positions
- Champions: Sweden (1st title)
- Runners-up: Soviet Union
- Third place: Finland
- Fourth place: Norway

Tournament statistics
- Games played: 12
- Goals scored: 90 (7.5 per game)

The 1981 Bandy World Championship was the 12th Bandy World Championship and was contested by four men's bandy playing nations. The championship was played in Khabarovsk in the Soviet Union from 7 to 15 February 1981. Sweden became champions for the first time. The Soviet Union had won all previous championships.

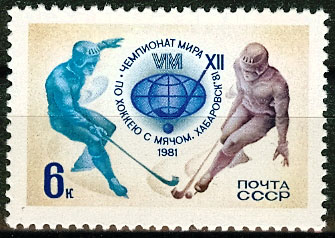
A USSR postage stamp issued to observe the 1981 world championship in bandy

== Qualified nations ==
- Soviet Union
- Finland
- Sweden
- Norway

== Tournament ==
All times are local (UTC+10).

Pos	Team	Pld	W	D	L	GF	GA	GD	Pts
1	Sweden	6	5	0	1	35	7	+28	10
2	Soviet Union (H)	6	5	0	1	38	8	+30	10
3	Finland	6	2	0	4	14	23	−9	4
4	Norway	6	0	0	6	3	52	−49	0

Source: 1981 WCS MEN – RESULTS
(H) Hosts
7 February 1981
-

Finland	6-1	Norway
No Match Data		No Match Data

Lenin Central Stadium, Khabarovsk
Attendance: -
Referee: -

7 February 1981
-

Soviet Union	1-6	Sweden
Valery Eikhvald 76'		Mats Carlsson 17', 38'; Bengt Ramström 26'; Mikael Arvidsson 28'; Håkan Karlsson 31', 48'

Lenin Central Stadium, Khabarovsk
Attendance: 25,000
Referee: (Norway) H. Trüver, (Norway) L. Hole

8 February 1981
-

Sweden	3-0	Finland
No Match Data		No Match Data

Lenin Central Stadium, Khabarovsk
Attendance: 20,000
Referee: (Soviet Union) Glebov, (Soviet Union) V. Kuznetsov

8 February 1981
15:00

Soviet Union	14-0	Norway
Sergei Lomanov 15', 53', 55', 56', 69'; Vitali Anufrienko 17', 66'; Valery Eikhvald 22', 32'; Leonid Lobachev 62'; Alexander Tsyganov 74', 82'; Nikolai Pazdnikov 78', 79'

Lenin Central Stadium, Khabarovsk
Attendance: 20,000
Referee: (Finland) T. Ruutu, (Finland) G. Hellgren

10 February 1981
-

Sweden	8-0	Norway
No Match Data

Lenin Central Stadium, Khabarovsk
Attendance: -
Referee: -

10 February 1981
-

Soviet Union	8-0	Finland
Vitali Savluk 8'; Sergei Lomanov 19', 53', 75'; Valery Bochkov 32', 57'; Vitali Anufrienko 34'; Alexander Pershin 83'

Lenin Central Stadium, Khabarovsk
Attendance: 25,000
Referee: (Norway) H. Trüver, (Norway) L. Hole

12 February 1981
-

Finland	5-1	Norway
No Match Data		No Match Data

Lenin Central Stadium, Khabarovsk
Attendance: -
Referee: -

12 February 1981
-

Soviet Union	3-1	Sweden
Sergei Lomanov 11', 49'; Valery Bochkov 80'		Håkan Karlsson 88'

Lenin Central Stadium, Khabarovsk
Attendance: 30,000
Referee: (Finland) T. Ruutu, (Finland) G. Hellgren

14 February 1981
14:30

Sweden	5-2	Finland
No Match Data		No Match Data

Lenin Central Stadium, Khabarovsk
Attendance: 15,000
Referee: (Norway) H. Trüver, (Norway) L. Hole

14 February 1981
-

Soviet Union	7-0	Norway
Sergei Lomanov 1', 44', 47'; Vladimir Plavunov 22'; Valery Eikhvald 47', 60'; Vitali Anufrienko 82'

Lenin Central Stadium, Khabarovsk
Attendance: 12,000
Referee: (Sweden) J. A. Bergqvist, (Sweden) L. Byström

15 February 1981
14:30

Sweden	12-1	Norway
No Match Data		No Match Data

Lenin Central Stadium, Khabarovsk
Attendance: 8,000
Referee: (Finland) T. Ruutu, (Finland) G. Hellgren

15 February 1981
-

Soviet Union	5-1	Finland
Eugene Velikanov 24', 68'; Valery Eikhvald 69', 84', 90+4'		Leo Segerman 76'

Lenin Central Stadium, Khabarovsk
Attendance: 25,000
Referee: (Sweden) J. A. Bergqvist, (Sweden) L. Byström

=== Final ranking ===
Rank	Team
1st place, gold medalist(s)	Sweden
2nd place, silver medalist(s)	Soviet Union
3rd place, bronze medalist(s)	Finland
4	Norway

=== Top Scorer ===
Scoring Leaders

- 13 Goals: (Soviet Union) Sergey Lomanov

Sweden champions due to better head-to-head record.

== Sweden's championship squad ==
- Ångström
- Arvidsson
- Björk
- Boström
- Callberg
- B. Carlsson
- M. Carlsson
- GK Fransson
- GK J. Johansson
- O. Johansson
- S. Karlsson
- H. Karlsson
- Kjellqvist
- Ramström
- Sjödin
- Söderholm
- Togner
- Coach: Sundin
