= 1987 Bandy World Championship =

15th Bandy World Championship

Tournament details
- Host country: Sweden
- Dates: 31 January – 8 February
- Teams: 8

Final positions
- Champions: Sweden (3rd title)
- Runners-up: Finland
- Third place: Soviet Union
- Fourth place: Norway

Tournament statistics
- Games played: 12
- Goals scored: 100 (8.33 per game)

The 1987 Bandy World Championship was the 15th Bandy World Championship and was contested by five men's bandy playing nations. The championship was played in Sweden from 31 January to 8 February 1987. Sweden became champions. Soviet Union, for the first time, did not reach the top two, while Finland managed to reach the final.

== Participants ==
- Sweden
- Finland
- Soviet Union
- Norway
- United States

=== Premier tour ===
- 31 January

USA – Sweden 0–12
Norway – Finland 2–7

- 1 February

Soviet Union – USA 21–1
Finland – Sweden 2–8

- 3 February

Soviet Union – Finland 2–4
Norway – Sweden 1–8

- 5 February

USA – Norway 1–4
Soviet Union – Sweden 2–3

- 6 February

Soviet Union – Norway 8–4
Finland – USA 10–0

Pos	Team	Pld	W	D	L	GF	GA	GD	Pts
1	Sweden	4	4	0	0	31	5	+26	8
2	Finland	4	3	0	1	23	12	+11	6
3	Soviet Union	4	2	0	2	33	12	+21	4
4	Norway	4	1	0	3	11	24	−13	2
5	United States	4	0	0	4	2	47	−45	0

==== Match for 3rd place ====
- 8 February

Soviet Union – Norway 11–3

==== Final ====
- 8 February at Söderstadion, Stockholm

Sweden – Finland 7–2
