= Olympic Stadium (Moscow) =

Indoor arena located in Moscow, Russia

Olimpiyskiy
- Спортивный комплекс Олимпийский

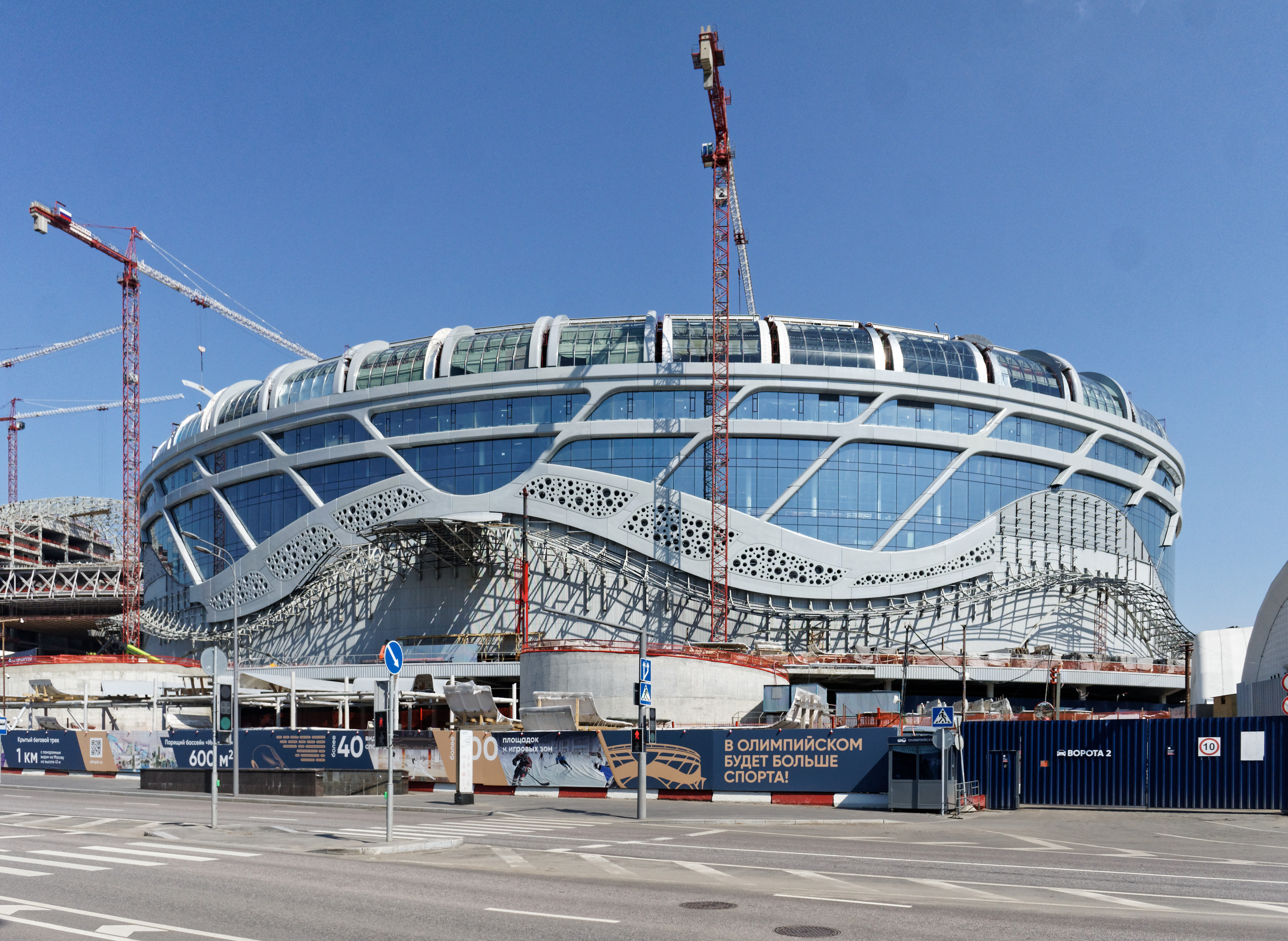
- New arena under construction (May 2026)
- Interactive map of Olimpiyskiy
- Full name: Olympic Sports Complex
- Address: 16 строение 1 Moscow 129090; Russia
- Location: Olimpiyskiy Prospekt
- Coordinates: 55°46′52″N 37°37′35″E
- Owner: ZAO Neftegazprod
- Capacity: 35,000 (Main Arena); 5,000 (North Hall)

Construction
- Groundbreaking: 1977
- Opened: 19 July 1980
- Closed: March 2019
- Demolished: 2020–2021
- Rebuilt: 2021–present
- Architects: Mikhail Posokhin; Boris Thor; Leonas Aranauskas
- Structural engineer: V. I. Nadezhdin
- General contractor: Glavmospromstroy

Website
- Venue Website

Olympic Stadium (Russian: Олимпийский стадион) (known locally as Olimpiyskiy) is a stadium and concert hall with adjacent swimming pool, located in Moscow. It used to be Europe's largest indoor arena before 2017, and the largest indoor arena in Russia before 2019. It was built for the Olympic games and has hosted numerous sports events, music concerts and other types of performances. It was fully demolished by 2021 and is now in the process of reconstruction.

== History ==
The Olimpiyskiy Sports Complex was developed by a group of architects headed by Mikhail Posokhin and Boris Tkhor, in preparation for 1980 Summer Olympics. Preliminary works required the demolishion of existing "Burevestnik" stadium and chemical-metallurgical plant, along with some residential parts of Dzerzhinsky (now Meshchansky District). Construction began in October 1977 and was finished on 19 July 1980. In 1982, leading architects received the Lenin prize for their project.

The majority of local and foreign performers coming to Moscow from 1980s to 2010s performed on its stage, with many of them being biggest names of their decades. After the dissolution of the Soviet Union the venue became a large indoor market of mostly clothing items, but it continued to host all kinds of events. In 1992, it hosted public sermons of Billy Graham and Aum Shinrikyo. In 2009, the venue hosted the Eurovision Song Contest.

In May 2014, the Government of Moscow auctioned 65% of shares in the stadium that it previously controlled. Oil company ZAO Neftegazprod won the auction, paying ₽4,672 billion rubles (approximately €100 million euros).

From the moment of its completion, the stadium remained the largest structure of its kind in the Soviet Union and later Russia, as well as in whole of Europe, until Paris La Défense Arena was opened in 2017.

On 1 January 2019, the sports complex was closed for reconstruction, which was scheduled to last until 2025. The pool closed in the summer of the same year. On 3 March, demolition of the main arena started and continued till 25 December 2020, when the sport complex buildings were completely demolished for further reconstruction. The reconstruction project was developed by the architectural bureau of the Kievskaya Ploshchad Group of companies together with the APA company. The demolition of old structures started in 2020 was finished by 2021. The new complex is currently being built.

== Design ==
=== Pre-reconstruction ===
View of the original arena and swimming pool venue (2014)

The original design of the complex represented an ensemble of Brutalist-style elipsoid stadium with "floating roof" look due to its concaved membrane top, connected to a wing-shaped glass and concrete swimming pool pavilion through an elevated platform, that doubled as parking lot while saving the space beneath.

The design of the stadium shared common motifs with V. I. Lenin Sport & Concert Complex project under construction in Leningrad, but was bigger in scale. It included a fitness center, team sports training halls, an ice rink, and the arena with 35,000 seats, that could be divided by a 20m thick soundproof barrier in 2 hours, and unobstructively host two different events simultaneously, each holding up to 16,000 people. Peripheral columns 40m high carried the weight of the ceiling, allowing for space inside the arena to remain support-free.

The swimming pool was located in the northern part of the complex and featured sections with the main pool, a training pool, a demonstration pool with seating for 8,000, a diving pool with seating for 5,000, locker rooms with showers, a sauna and a gym, fitting up to 15,000 spectators In total.

=== New complex ===
After reconstruction, the complex will consist of four buildings, three of which will be combined by a stylobate and a system of transitions: the Main Building, Aquatic Complex, Sports and Recreation Complex and Small Concert Hall. According to the data released during the arrival of Sergei Sobyanin for a 3rd term as the Mayor of Moscow, Olimpiyskiy provides for the creation of a concert venue with capacity for 12,000 people, a cinema cluster, a water amusement park, a shopping space, and an exhibition space. The renovated sports complex will retain swimming and jumping pools, there will be gyms, tennis courts, an indoor ice rink, a wellness and rehabilitation complex, a beach sports center – in total, more than 100 playgrounds and play areas for more than 30 sports have been announced.

== Events ==
=== 1980 Summer Olympics ===
Virtually every boxing match of those games took place inside the arena, Including the final, where Teófilo Stevenson defeated Pyotr Zayev and claimed the gold, making him the second boxer in history to win three Olympic gold medals in the same weight class. Some basketball games were also hosted by the venue at the time, notably men's and women's finals.

Several world records were set within the walls of the complex: Soviet gymnast Alexander Dityatin won eight medals (three gold, four silver and one bronze) on its arena, which landed his score into Guinness Book of Records, and it remains unbeaten (Although Michael Phelps managed to repeat his achievement in 2004).

New individual and team records were set by East German national women's team in swimming pool of the complex: Barbara Krause (100m freestyle), Rica Reinisch, (100m backstroke), Petra Schneider (400m individual medley) and Ute Geweniger (100m breaststroke). Meanwhile, Soviet swimmer Vladimir Salnikov became the first person to swim the distance in under 15 (14:58.27) minute time.

=== Other sporting events ===
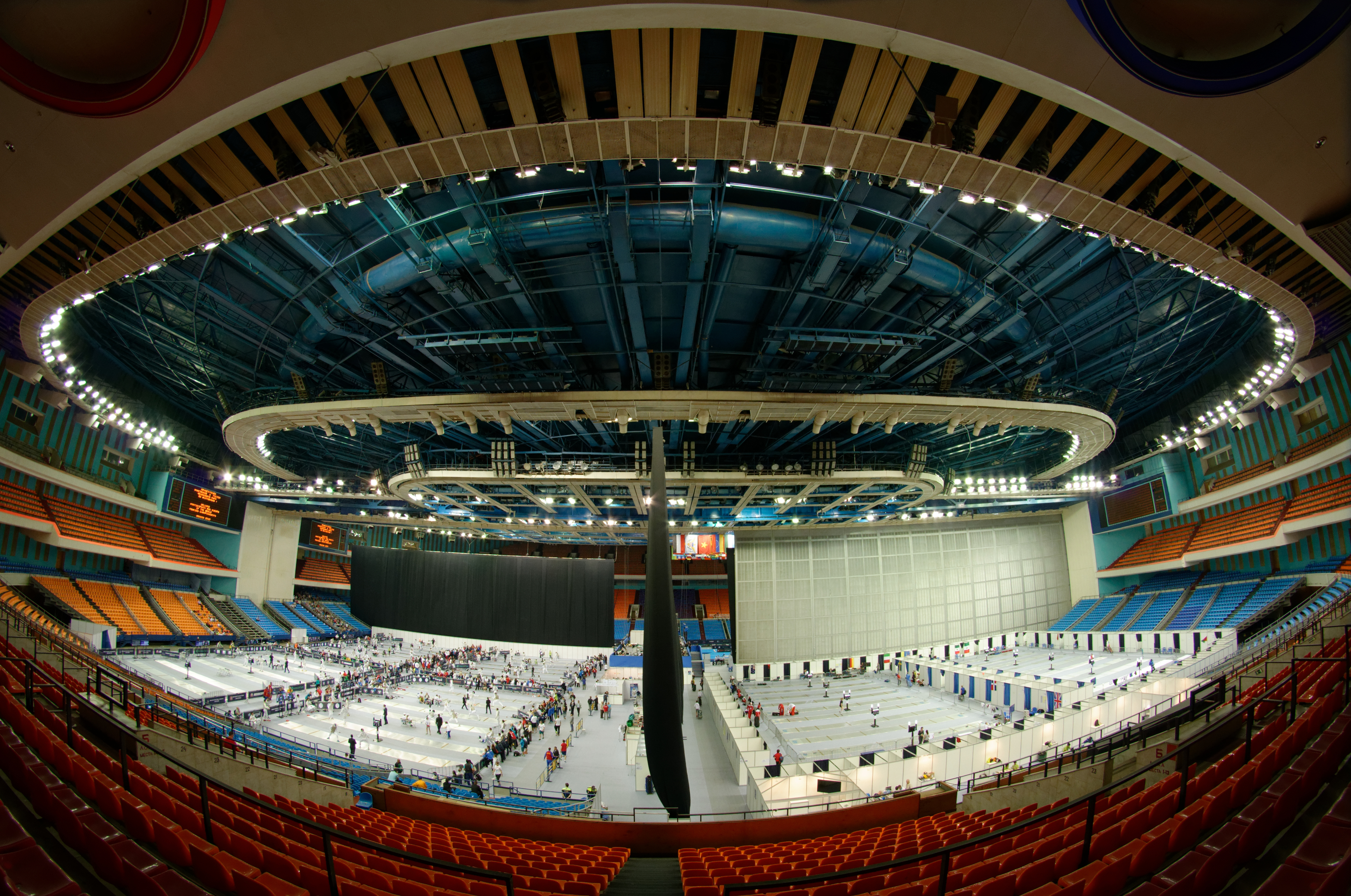
A view during the 2015 World Fencing Championships on 15 July. The soundproof barrier can be seen in the right section.

It was the world's first indoor bandy arena and hosted the Bandy World Championships in 1989 (the first bandy world championship held indoors) and again in 2008.

Beginning in 1990, the arena became the place of choice to host the annual Kremlin Cup tennis tournament, which was suspended after reconstruction of the complex began.

The arena hosted the 1999 FIBA EuroStars game and the 2005 Euroleague Final Four. The 2013 European Artistic Gymnastics Championships were held in the stadium between 17 and 23 April 2013.

On 12 September 2014, the Davis Cup tournament was held at the stadium between Portugal and Russia.

On 15 July 2015, the World Fencing Championships took place in the arena.

The venue hosted the World Boxing Super Series men's, cruiserweight final between Oleksandr Usyk and Murat Gassiev in front of 24,000 fans in attendance on 21 July 2018. Usyk won the fight comfortably, becoming the first fighter at cruiserweight to unify all four world title belts. Muhammad Ali's widow, Lonnie Ali, presented the Ali trophy to Usyk after the fight.

=== Music ===
In June 2014, Linkin Park performed here for The Hunting Party Tour.

At the time of its demolition, SC Olympiyskiy was the largest indoor concert arena in Russia. Many international artists played concerts here as part of their world tours, such as A-ha, Asia, Depeche Mode, Mylène Farmer, Beyoncé, Britney Spears, Black Sabbath, Bonnie Tyler, Slipknot, Enrique Iglesias, George Michael, Imagine Dragons, Iron Maiden, Jamiroquai, Justin Bieber, Justin Timberlake, Kylie Minogue, Lady Gaga, Linkin Park, Madonna, Muse, Nazareth, Paul McCartney, Pink Floyd, Roger Waters, Rihanna, Robbie Williams, Roxette, Whitney Houston. The venue hosted the Eurovision Song Contest 2009, the only time Russia hosted the competition.

== Gallery ==
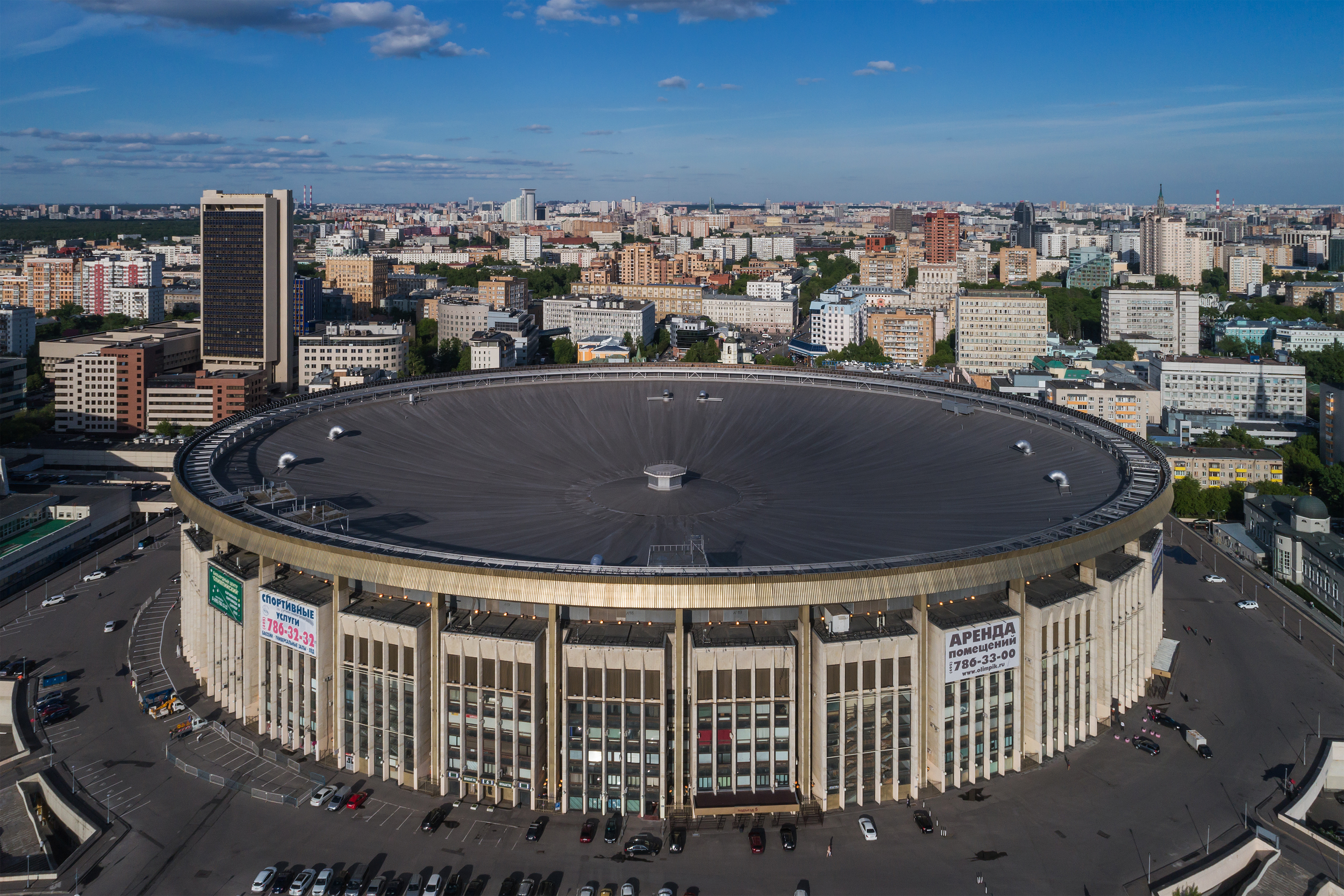
Old arena

Old complex viewed from Yekaterininskiy Park

Old arena at night

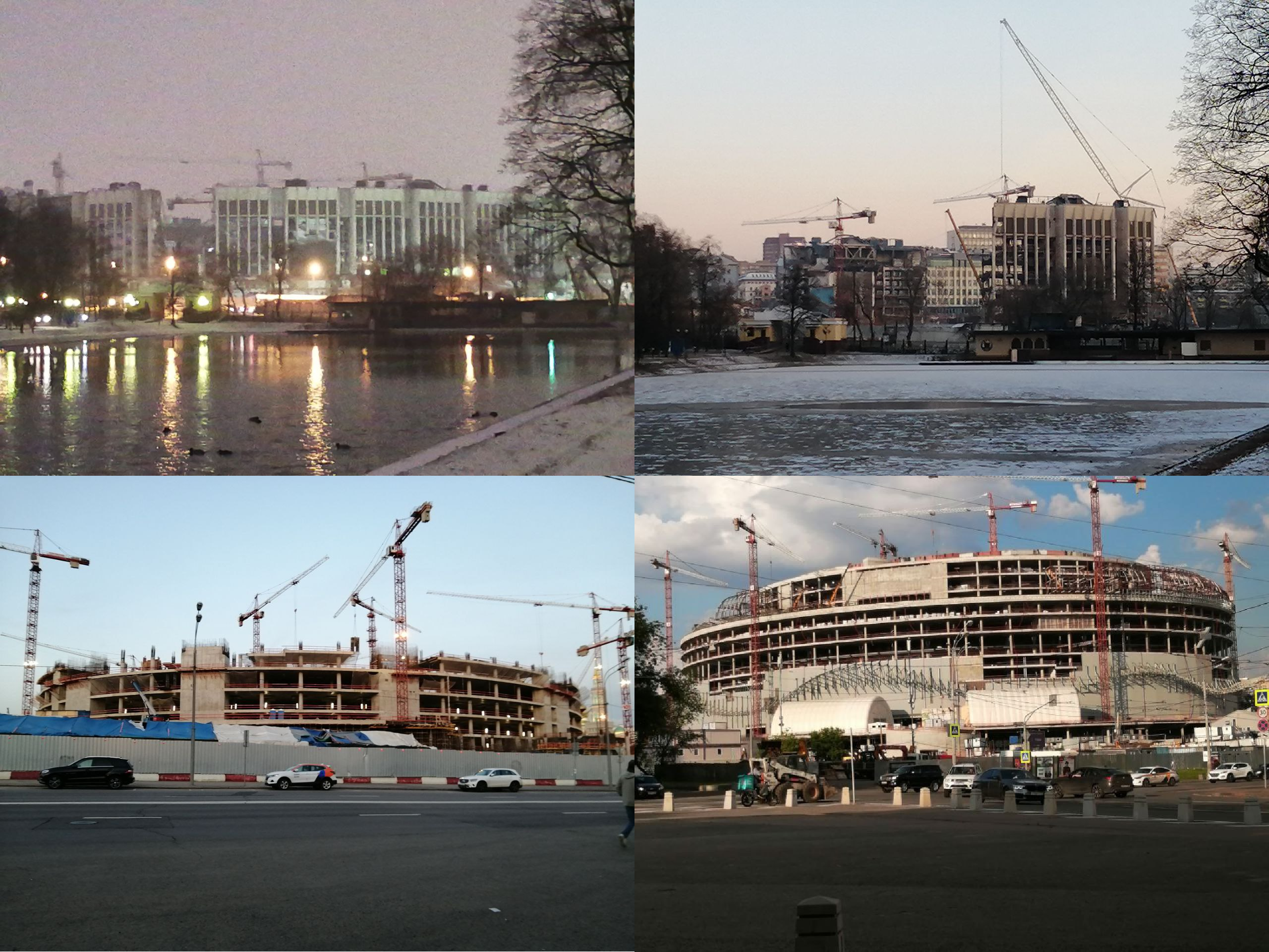
Stages of reconstruction of the complex

== See also ==
- List of indoor arenas in Russia
- List of tennis stadiums by capacity

Events and tenants
Preceded by Montreal Forum; Montreal	Olympic Basketball tournament Final Venue; 1980	Succeeded by The Forum; Los Angeles
Preceded by Exhibition Hall; Düsseldorf	Davis Cup; Final Venue; 1994 – 1995	Succeeded by Mässan Hall; Malmö
Preceded by Max Schmeling Halle; Berlin	FIBA Euro All star game Venue; 1999	Succeeded by Final Venue
Preceded by Palacio de Congresos de Maspalomas	Fed Cup; Final Four venue 2003	Succeeded by Krylatskoe Sport Palace
Preceded by Yad Eliyahu Sports Hall; Tel Aviv	Euroleague; Final Four; Venue; 2005	Succeeded by Sazka Arena; Prague
Preceded by Sibamac Arena; Bratislava	Davis Cup; Final Venue; 2006	Succeeded by Memorial Coliseum; Portland
Preceded by Budapest Sports Arena; Budapest	IAAF World Indoor Championships in Athletics; Venue; 2006	Succeeded by Luis Puig Palace; Valencia
Preceded by Söderstadion; Stockholm	Bandy World Championship; Final Venue; 1989	Succeeded by Oulunkylä Ice Rink; Helsinki
Preceded by Khimik Stadium; Kemerovo	Bandy World Championship; Final Venue; 2008	Succeeded by ABB Arena Syd; Västerås
Preceded by Belgrade Arena; Belgrade	Eurovision Song Contest; Venue; 2009	Succeeded by Telenor Arena; Oslo
