= 1965 Bandy World Championship =

4th Bandy World Championship

Tournament details
- Host country: Soviet Union
- Dates: 21–27 February
- Teams: 4

Final positions
- Champions: Soviet Union (4th title)
- Runners-up: Norway
- Third place: Sweden
- Fourth place: Finland

Tournament statistics
- Games played: 6
- Goals scored: 23 (3.83 per game)

The 1965 Bandy World Championship was the fourth Bandy World Championship and was contested by four men's bandy playing nations. The championship was played in five cities of the Soviet Union (Arkhangelsk, Ivanovo, Kursk, Moscow and Sverdlovsk) on February 21–27, 1965. The Soviet Union became champions.

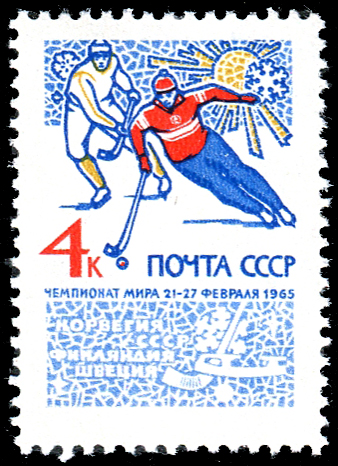
Commemorative postage stamp

== Qualified nations ==
- Soviet Union
- Finland
- Sweden
- Norway

== Tournament ==
All times are local (UTC+3).

Pos	Team	Pld	W	D	L	GF	GA	GD	Pts
1	Soviet Union (H)	3	2	1	0	12	3	+9	5
2	Sweden	3	0	2	1	6	7	−1	2
3	Finland	3	1	0	2	2	7	−5	2
4	Norway	3	1	1	1	3	6	−3	3

Source: 1965 WCS MEN – RESULTS
(H) Hosts
21 February 1965
-

Soviet Union	5-0	Finland
Yevgeny Papugin 5', 56'; Nikolai Durakov 15'; Mikhail Osintsev 40'; Aleksandr Izmodenov 77'

Central Dynamo Stadium, Moscow
Attendance: ~20,000
Referee: (Norway) L. Paulsen, (Norway) J. Østlie

22 February 1965
15:00

Sweden	2-2	Norway
Hasse Nordin 18'; Gunnar Palmer <90'		No Match Data

Tekstilshchik, Ivanovo
Attendance: ~14,000
Referee: (Soviet Union) Bocharov, (Soviet Union) Kakaulin, (Finland) R. Koskinen, (Finland) P. Veromaa

24 February 1965
14:00

Sweden	1-2	Finland
Leif Fredblad 30'		No Match Data

Dinamo, Arkhangelsk
Attendance: ~18,000
Referee: (Soviet Union) Khlopotin, (Soviet Union) Solovyov, (Norway) Paulsen, (Norway) Østlie

24 February 1965
-

Soviet Union	4-0	Norway
Nikolai Durakov 12', 43', 62'; Yuri Varzin 49'

Central Stadium, Sverdlovsk
Attendance: ~26,000
Referee: (Sweden) I. Berglund, (Sweden) I. Johansson

26 February
16:00

Norway	1-0	Finland
Roar lower Nilsen 33'

Trudovye Rezervy, Kursk
Attendance: ~15,000
Referee: (Sweden) I. Berglund, (Sweden) I. Johansson, (Soviet Union) Sinchugov, (Soviet Union) Tikhonov

27 February 1965
-

Soviet Union	3-3	Sweden
Mikhail Osintsev 36'; Albert Vologzhannikov 76'; Nikolai Durakov 80'		Hasse Nordin 44'; Bernt Eriksson 48'; Kurt Sedwall 64'

Central Dynamo Stadium, Moscow
Attendance: ~30,000
Referee: (Finland) R. Koskinen, (Finland) P. Veromaa

=== Final ranking ===
Rank	Team
1st place, gold medalist(s)	Soviet Union
2nd place, silver medalist(s)	Norway
3rd place, bronze medalist(s)	Sweden
4	Finland

=== Top Scorer ===
Scoring Leaders

- 5 Goals: (Soviet Union) Nikolai Durakov

=== Awards ===
Best players selected by the directorate:

- Best Goaltender: (Sweden) Börje Andersson
- Best Defenceman: (Soviet Union) italy Danilov
- Best Midfielder: (Soviet Union) Nikolai Durakov
- Best Forward: (Sweden) Bernt Eriksson
