= Four nation bandy tournament in 1954 =

The four-nation bandy tournament in 1954 was a tournament of friendlies played in Moscow, Soviet Union, in February 1954, contested by Finland, Norway, the Soviet Union and Sweden. Sweden won the tournament.

The Soviet Union invited the other three countries after having seen them playing at the Winter Olympics in Oslo in 1952. The tournament can be seen as a form of unofficial pre–World Championship competition. The four countries used somewhat different rules prior to this tournament, but the rules were adjusted for future consistency.

The next year, the four countries formally founded the international bandy governing body, which would arrange the Bandy World Championships from 1957 onwards.

== Matches ==
- 24 February 1954: Soviet Union - Finland 2-1 (0-1), Moscow, Soviet Union
- 24 February 1954: Sweden - Norway 4-0 (1-0), Moscow, Soviet Union
- 26 February 1954: Soviet Union - Norway 8-0 (6-0), Moscow, Soviet Union
- 26 February 1954: Sweden - Finland 4-4 (3-2), Moscow, Soviet Union
- 28 February 1954: Finland - Norway 2-0, Moscow, Soviet Union
- 28 February 1954: Sweden - Soviet Union 2-1 (2-1), Moscow, Soviet Union

== Final results ==
Land	Pld	W	D	L	GS	GA	Pts
Sweden	3	2	1	0	10	5	5
Soviet Union	3	2	0	1	11	3	4
Finland	3	1	1	1	7	6	3
Norway	3	0	0	3	0	14	0
