= Leif Fredblad =

Swedish bandy and ice hockey player

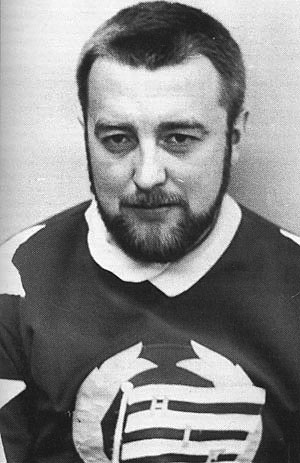
- Fredblad with Hammarby IF.
- Born: Leif Gustaf Fredblad; 16 July 1936; Stockholm, Sweden
Bandy career
- Playing position: Forward
Senior career*
Years	Team	Apps^{†}	(Gls)^{†}
1951–1954	Gustavsbergs IF		
1954–1973	Hammarby IF		
National team
1957–1968	Sweden	30	(16)
- * Senior club appearances and goals counted for the domestic league only. † Appearances (Goals).
Ice hockey career
- Position: Forward
- Played for: Hammarby IF; GAIS; IK Göta; Djurgårdens IF
- National team: Sweden
- Playing career: 1956–1963

Leif Fredblad (born 16 July 1936) is a former Swedish bandy and ice hockey player.

Playing bandy in the domestic top tier for almost two decades with Hammarby IF, he competed in five World Championships and is a member of the Swedish Bandy Hall of Fame.

He had a shorter ice hockey career, but won the Swedish championship title in 1962 with Djurgårdens IF.

== Athletic career ==
=== Bandy ===
He started to play bandy with local club Gustavsbergs IF, debuting in their senior team at age 15. In 1954, Fredblad moved to Hammarby IF and won a promotion to Division 1, the domestic top tier, in his debut season.

Playing as a forward, Fredblad established himself as a feared sniper, a master at covering the ball and an outstanding dribbler. Hammarby IF reached its first Swedish championship final in 1957, but lost 1–2 to Örebro SK at Stockholms stadion, in which Fredblad scored the consolation goal for his side, assisted by Rolf Pettersson.

In total, Fredblad played five World Championship with Sweden, being part of Sweden's squad in the inaugural tournament in 1957. His best result was winning the bronze medal in 1961, losing 2–1 against Soviet Union in the final. A full international for more than a decade, Fredblad won 30 caps for Sweden and scored 16 goals.

From his debut in the Swedish top tier in 1956, Fredblad competed in the league with Hammarby IF for 14 seasons in a row, although they failed to reach the national final. On 11 January 1967, he scored a career-best six goals in one single game, as his side won 8–3 at home against Villa Lidköping.

When Hammarby IF was relegated to the second tier in 1969, Fredblad decided to stay and went on to lead his side to an immediate promotion. He played three more seasons with the club in Division 1 before retiring in 1973. In total, Fredblad played 203 games with Hammarby IF in the highest division, scoring 221 goals.

Fredblad is a recipient of the honorary award Stora Grabbars Märke and was inducted into the Swedish Bandy Hall of Fame in 2018 by the Swedish Bandy Association. In 2019, Hammarby IF inducted Fredblad into their own Hall of Fame, accompanied by his former teammate Åke Andersson as a fellow member.

=== Ice hockey ===
Like many other bandy players at the time, Fredblad also played ice hockey. He made his debut in the senior roster of Hammarby IF in 1956, competing in the top flight Division 1. In 1959, Fredblad left the side and briefly represented GAIS, as he was stationed in Gothenburg during his military service.

He soon returned to Stockholm and joined IK Göta. Fredblad won the Swedish championship title in 1962 with Djurgårdens IF, his only season with the club.

On 18 January 1962, Fredblad made his first and only international appearance for Sweden in a 7–1 win against Finland, an exhibition game played at Nya Ullevi. He retired from ice hockey a year later.
