= Rauno Ruotsalainen =

Finnish footballer (born 1938)

Personal information
- Date of birth: 4 February 1938 (age 88)

International career
Years	Team	Apps	(Gls)
1962–1965	Finland	6	(0)

Rauno Ruotsalainen (born 4 February 1938) is a Finnish footballer. He played in six matches for the Finland national football team from 1962 to 1965.
