= Sweden national bandy team =

Sweden
- Association: Swedish Bandy Association (Svenska bandyförbundet)
- Head coach: (Sweden) Michael Carlsson
- Team colors
Home colours	Away colours

First international
- Sweden 12 – 1 Finland; Helsinki, Grand Duchy of Finland, Russian Empire 11 March 1907

Biggest win
- Sweden 34–0 Hungary (Pori, Finland; 12 January 2026)

Biggest defeat
- Sweden 0–8 Soviet Union (Stockholm, Sweden; 24 February 1963)

Bandy World Championship
- Appearances: 42 (first in 1957)
- Best result: Champions (1981, 1983, 1987, 1993, 1995, 1997, 2003, 2005, 2009, 2010, 2012, 2017, 2023, 2025, 2026)

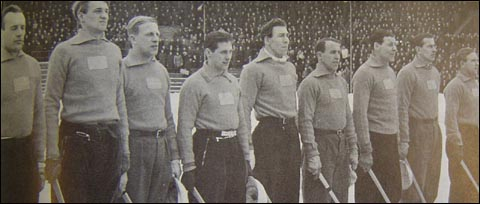
The Swedish team in 1947

The Sweden national bandy team (Swedish: Sveriges herrlandslag i bandy) represents Sweden in the sport of bandy. There are two separate national teams, a national bandy team for men, and a national bandy team for women. This article deals chiefly with Sweden's national men's bandy team.

Sweden has been playing friendlies against Finland and Norway since the early 20th century. In 1907 and 1909 there were also occasional games against Russia and Denmark. The games were set up informally from 1907 and in official internationals from 1919. Agreements were made to play friendlies against the Soviet Union in the late 1940s, but the plans did not come to fruition.

Finland, Norway and Sweden played bandy at the Winter Olympics in Oslo in 1952. After having seen them there, the Soviet Union invited these three countries to a four nation bandy tournament in 1954. This was the first time a Soviet national bandy team met other national bandy teams. The four countries used somewhat different rules prior to this tournament, but the rules were adjusted to be the same for the future. Sweden won the tournament.

Sweden has been taking part in the bandy world championships since the start in 1957. The team has never finished worse than third place (which once, in 1957, was last place) and has won the championship 12 times as of 2017.

In the 2009 World Championship Sweden won in the final against Russia. Sweden repeated the victory in the 2010 World Championships, this time in Moscow, marking the first time Sweden won a bandy world championship in the capital of Russia. This was the tenth victory in the world championships for Sweden.

Sweden won the Rossiya Tournament in 1974 and 1990 and has won its successor Russian Government Cup in 1994, 1996 and 2003.

The record for senior men's team appearances for the Swedish national bandy team is held by former Borlänge/Stora Tuna BK, Falu BS, Västerås SK Bandy, IFK Vänersborg, Sandvikens AIK and Tillberga IK Bandy player Per Fosshaug, who played for the team 129 times.

== Olympics ==
Games	Finish
Norway 1952, Oslo	Gold

== Unofficial tournament ==
Games	Finish
Soviet Union 1954, Moscow	Gold
Finland 2020, Porvoo / Lappeenranta	Bronze
Sweden 2024, Karlstad	Gold

== Team Sweden International Record ==
Updated as of the 2026 World Championship

Sweden Overall World Championship Record 1957-2026
Country	Games Played	Wins	Draws	Losses	Win%	Goals For	Goals Against	Goal Difference	First Match	Last Match
Sweden	237	176	16	45	74.26	1814	573	1241	28.2.1957	18.1.2026

World Championship Record 1957-2026
Country	Games Played	Wins	Draws	Losses	Win%	Goals For	Goals Against	Goal Difference	First Match	Last Match
Finland	65	49	4	12	75.38	369	154	215	28.2.1957	18.1.2026
Norway	47	44	2	1	93.62	392	70	322	22.2.1961	17.1.2026
Russia	41	19	5	17	46.34	165	154	11	4.2.1993	2.2.2019
Kazakhstan	30	30	0	0	100	297	68	229	4.2.1997	1.4.2023
Soviet Union	27	7	5	15	25.93	64	80	-16	2.3.1957	24.3.1991
United States	13	13	0	0	100	193	16	177	5.2.1985	15.1.2026
Belarus	7	7	0	0	100	149	17	132	28.3.2001	30.1.2014
Hungary	3	3	0	0	100	81	3	78	2.2.2018	25.3.2025
Latvia	2	2	0	0	100	42	5	37	1.4.2015	4.2.2016
Germany	1	1	0	0	100	34	6	28	2.2.2017	2.2.2017
Netherlands	1	1	0	0	100	28	0	28	13.1.2026	13.1.2026

== World Championship record ==
Tournament	Final standing
Finland 1957	Bronze
Norway 1961	Silver
Sweden 1963	Bronze
Soviet Union 1965	Bronze
Finland 1967	Bronze
Sweden 1969	Silver
Sweden 1971	Silver
Soviet Union 1973	Silver
Finland 1975	Silver
Norway 1977	Silver
Sweden 1979	Silver
Soviet Union 1981	Gold
Finland 1983	Gold
Norway 1985	Silver
Sweden 1987	Gold
Soviet Union 1989	Bronze
Finland 1991	Silver
Norway 1993	Gold
USA 1995	Gold
Sweden 1997	Gold
Russia 1999	Bronze
Finland and Sweden 2001	Silver
Russia 2003	Gold
Sweden 2004	Silver
Russia 2005	Gold
Sweden 2006	Silver
Russia 2007	Silver
Russia 2008	Silver
Sweden 2009	Gold
Russia 2010	Gold
Russia 2011	Bronze
Kazakhstan 2012	Gold
Sweden and Norway 2013	Silver
Russia 2014	Silver
Russia 2015	Silver
Russia 2016	Bronze
Sweden 2017	Gold
Russia 2018	Silver
Sweden 2019	Silver
Sweden 2023	Gold
Sweden 2025	Gold
Finland 2026	Gold

== Current squad ==
Swedish squad at the 2014 World Championship in Irkutsk, Russia, January 26 – February 2, 2014.

Pos.	Age	Name	Club
GK	39	Andreas Bergwall	(Sweden) Västerås SK
GK	38	Anders Svensson	(Russia) Dynamo Kazan
DF	26	Martin Johansson	(Sweden) Villa Lidköping BK
DF	30	Per Hellmyrs	(Russia) Dynamo Moscow
DF	26	Linus Pettersson	(Russia) Zorky Krasnogorsk
DF	36	Andreas Westh	(Sweden) Bollnäs GIF
DF	37	Daniel Välitalo	(Russia) Dynamo Kazan
MF	25	Erik Säfström	(Sweden) Sandvikens AIK
MF	31	Hans Andersson	(Russia) Dynamo Kazan
MF	27	Johan Löfstedt	(Sweden) Vetlanda BK
MF	28	David Pizzoni Elfving	(Sweden) Hammarby IF
MF	26	Daniel Berlin	(Russia) Dynamo Moscow
MF	32	Ulf Einarsson	(Sweden) Hammarby IF
MF	26	Christoffer Edlund	(Sweden) Sandvikens AIK
FW	23	Adam Gilljam	(Sweden) Hammarby IF
FW	30	Daniel Andersson	(Sweden) Villa Lidköping BK
FW	31	Patrik Nilsson	(Sweden) Hammarby IF
FW	18	Erik Pettersson	(Sweden) Sandvikens AIK
