= Dag Vidar Kristoffersen =

Norwegian football coach (born 1957)

Dag Vidar Kristoffersen (born 20 April 1957, in Drammen) is a Norwegian football coach, best known for his time in Strømsgodset where he led the team to two silver medals in the Norwegian Football Cup and bronze medals in the Tippeligaen. Kristoffersen is a former football and bandy player, having represented Drafn in both sports.

He collected silver and bronze medals in bandy World Cups in 1976 and 1977, in the one instance scoring the decisive goal. He currently coaches Drammen Bandy.

Kristoffersen suffered a stroke in 2002, leaving him temporarily unable to speak. After a year he was back coaching football with Larvik and had made a 100% recovery.
