= Valle Hovin stadion =

Multi-purpose stadium in Oslo, Norway

Coordinates: 59°55′7″N 10°48′14″E

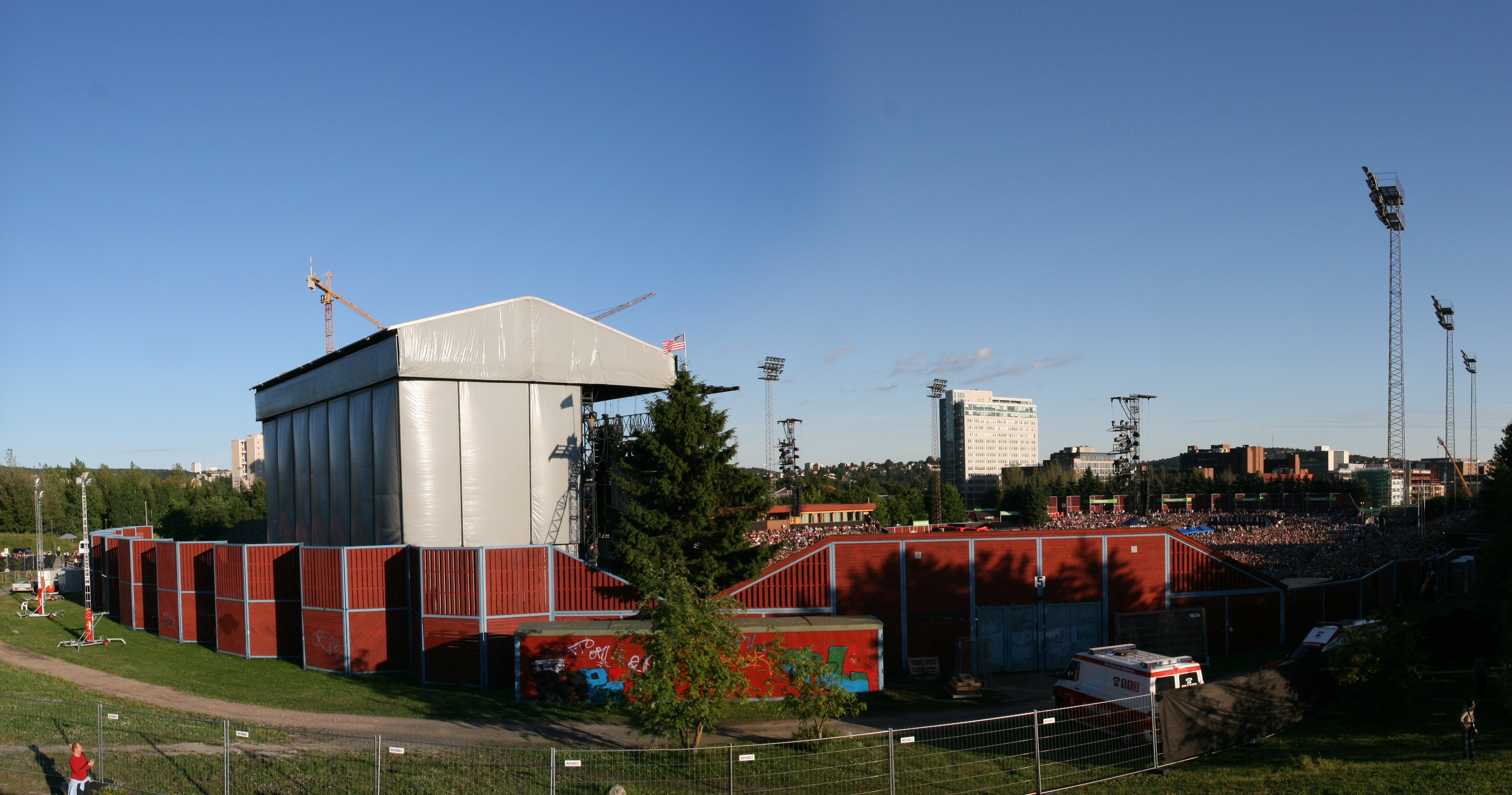
- Valle Hovin stadion in July 2008
- Interactive map of Valle Hovin stadion
- Address: Oslo; Norway

Construction
- Opened: 1969

Valle Hovin stadion is both a bandy and speed skating rink in cold weather, and an outdoor stadium for concerts in warm weather, in Valle-Hovin, Oslo, Norway.

It is located in the residential area Valle-Hovin, amongst trees and a park. It is reachable from the Lines 1, 2, 3, and 4 reaching the Helsfyr station of the Oslo T-bane metro system, and additionally via two bus lines as well as substantial parking for automobiles.

As a concert venue Valle Hovin stadion can hold at least 40,000 people, many of whom stand on the concrete floor where the rink is laid in winter. Many internationally famous popular music acts have appeared there, the first one being Tina Turner on 20 June 1987. Prior to a June 1995 expansion, the concert capacity was 30,000. As a concert venue, it is not always thought of as best, due to lack of seating and limited sightlines once well back in the crowd, but it offers larger capacity than the indoor Oslo Spektrum and is sometimes deemed preferable to Ullevaal Stadion due to having a concrete floor that cannot be damaged by stage and moving equipment as can that football ground's more delicate turf.

It was the main arena for the Bandy World Championship 1985.

== Concerts ==
- Tina Turner – 20 June 1987, 20 May 1990 & 6 August 2000
- Deep Purple – 22 August 1987
- Bruce Springsteen & The E Street Band – 1988, 1999, 2003 & twice in 2008, 2012
- Bruce Springsteen – 1993
- Pink Floyd – 2 August 1988 & 29–30 August 1994
- Prince – 14 August 1988
- Van Halen – 28 August 1988
- The Rolling Stones – 6–7 August 1990, 9 June 1995, 2 August 1998 & 8 August 2007
- Michael Jackson – 15 July 1992 & 19 August 1997
- Dire Straits – 30 July 1992
- U2 – 29 July 1993, with PJ Harvey & Stereo MC's, 6 August 1997 & 27 July 2005, with Paddy Casey & Razorlight
- Guns N' Roses – 10 June 1993 & 19 July 2018
- Paul McCartney – 14 June 2004
- Metallica – 10 July 2007 & 23 May 2012
- Iron Maiden – 24 July 2008
- AC/DC – 15 June 2009, 30 May 2010, 17 July 2015
- Madonna – 28–30 July 2009

Preceded by Oulunkylä Ice Rink; Helsinki, Finland	Bandy World Championship; Final Venue; 1985	Succeeded by Söderstadion; Stockholm, Sweden

== See also ==
- Vallhall Arena, also in Valle-Hovin neighborhood
