= Norway national bandy team =

Men's national bandy team representing Norway

Norway
- Association: Norway's Bandy Association
- Head coach: (Norway) Thomas Moen
- Team colors

First international
- Norway 1–3 Sweden (Oslo, Norway; 6 February 1927)

Biggest win
- Norway 32–0 Belarus (Haparanda, Sweden; 29 March 2001)

Biggest defeat
- Russia 22–0 Norway (Kazan, Russia 1 February 2005)

Bandy World Championship
- Appearances: 40 (first in 1961)
- Best result: 2nd (1965)

Medal record

World Championship
Silver medal – second place	1965 Soviet Union	
Bronze medal – third place	1993 Norway	
Bronze medal – third place	2023 Sweden	
Bronze medal – third place	2025 Sweden	
Bronze medal – third place	2026 Finland	

The Norway national bandy team (Norwegian: Norges herrelandslag i bandy) represents Norway in the sport of bandy. The country has both a men's national team and a women's national team. This article deals chiefly with the men's national team.

Norway, Finland and Sweden played bandy at the Winter Olympics in Oslo in 1952. After having seen them there, the Soviet Union invited these three countries to a four-nation bandy tournament in 1954. This was the first time a Soviet national bandy team met other national bandy teams. The four countries used somewhat different rules prior to this tournament, but the rules were adjusted to be the same for the future.

Norway has been competing in the Bandy World Championship since the second tournament in 1961. Norway's best world championship results have been a second place in 1965 and third place in 1993 and 2023.

Norway's best result in the Russian Government Cup is second place in 1994.

== World Championship record ==
Tournament	Final standing
Finland 1957	Didn't participate
Norway 1961	4th place
Sweden 1963	4th place
Soviet Union 1965	Silver
Finland 1967	4th place
Sweden 1969	Didn't participate
Sweden 1971	4th place
Soviet Union 1973	4th place
Finland 1975	4th place
Norway 1977	4th place
Sweden 1979	4th place
Soviet Union 1981	4th place
Finland 1983	4th place
Norway 1985	4th place
Sweden 1987	4th place
Soviet Union 1989	4th place
Finland 1991	4th place
Norway 1993	Bronze
USA 1995	5th place
Sweden 1997	5th place
Russia 1999	4th place
Finland and Sweden 2001	5th place
Russia 2003	5th place
Sweden 2004	5th place
Russia 2005	5th place
Sweden 2006	5th place
Russia 2007	5th place
Russia 2008	5th place
Sweden 2009	5th place
Russia 2010	5th place
Russia 2011	5th place
Kazakhstan 2012	5th place
Sweden and Norway 2013	5th place
Russia 2014	5th place
Russia 2015	5th place
Russia 2016	5th place
Sweden 2017	4th place
Russia 2018	6th place
Sweden 2019	5th place
Sweden 2023	Bronze
Sweden 2025	Bronze
Finland 2026	Bronze

== Current squad ==
Norwegian squad at the 2014 World Championship in Irkutsk, Russia, January 26 – February 2, 2014.

Pos.	Age	Name	Club
GK	29	Christopher Smerkerud	(Norway) Ullevål IL
GK	21	Kenneth Larsen	(Norway) Sarpsborg BK
DF	23	Anders Greger Svenn	(Norway) Ullevål IL
DF	20	Sigurd Strømnes	(Norway) Sarpsborg BK
DF	27	Anders Christensen	(Norway) Stabæk IF
DF	20	Fredrik Randsborg	(Norway) Stabæk IF
MF	28	Christian Randsborg	(Norway) Stabæk IF
MF	23	Nikolai Rustad Jensen	(Norway) Stabæk IF
MF	27	Magnus Høgevold	(Norway) Stabæk IF
MF	24	Petter Yngve Løyning	(Norway) Stabæk IF
MF	27	Jan Olav Løyning	(Norway) Stabæk IF
MF	24	Robin Nicolay Cras	(Norway) Mjøndalen IF
MF	32	Christian Lauenborg Waaler	(Norway) IF Ready
FW	20	Andreas Haugo Killingstad	(Norway) Stabæk IF
FW	32	Petter Renstrøm Moen	(Norway) Solberg SK
FW	29	Marius Austad	(Norway) Solberg SK
