= Tekstilshchik =

Tekstilshchik (Russian: Текстильщик, also Textilshchik, Tekstilschik, Textilschik) means "the textile workers" or "the weavers".

As a sports team nickname, it may refer to:

- FC Tekstilshchik Kamyshin, a Russian football club from Kamyshin that played in the Top Division and the 1994-95 UEFA Cup
- FC Tekstilshchik Ivanovo, a Russian football club from Ivanovo
- Clubs formerly named Tekstilshchik:
  - FC Spartak Kostroma, formerly Tekstilshchik Kostroma
  - FC Volga Ulyanovsk, formerly Tekstilshchik Isheyevka
  - FC Iskra Smolensk, formerly Tekstilshchik Smolensk
  - CS Tiligul-Tiras Tiraspol, a defunct former top-flight club from Transnistria, Moldova, formerly Tekstilshchik Tiraspol
  - Energetik FK, an Azeri club, formerly Textilshchik

Other uses:

- Tekstilshchiki District, a district of the South-Eastern Administrative Okrug of the city of Moscow
