= Soviet Union national bandy team =

Soviet Union
- Association: Bandy and Field Hockey Federation of the USSR
- Team colors
Home colours	Away colours

First international
- Soviet Union 2 – 1 Finland; Moscow, 24 February 1954

Biggest win
- Soviet Union 21 – 1 United States; Skövde, 1 February 1987

Biggest defeat
- Sweden 9 – 3 Soviet Union; Helsinki, 20 February 1983

Final international
- Soviet Union 4 – 3 Sweden; Helsinki, 23 March 1991

Bandy World Championship
- Appearances: 17 (first in 1957)
- Best result: 1. (1957, 1961, 1963, 1965, 1967, 1969, 1971, 1973, 1975, 1977, 1979, 1985, 1989, 1991)

Medal record

World Championship
Gold medal – first place	1957 Finland	
Gold medal – first place	1961 Norway	
Gold medal – first place	1963 Sweden	
Gold medal – first place	1965 Soviet Union	
Gold medal – first place	1967 Soviet Union	
Gold medal – first place	1969 Sweden	
Gold medal – first place	1971 Sweden	
Gold medal – first place	1973 Soviet Union	
Gold medal – first place	1975 Finland	
Gold medal – first place	1977 Norway	
Gold medal – first place	1979 Sweden	
Gold medal – first place	1985 Norway	
Gold medal – first place	1989 Soviet Union	
Gold medal – first place	1991 Finland	
Silver medal – second place	1981 Soviet Union	
Silver medal – second place	1983 Finland	
Bronze medal – third place	1987 Sweden	

The Soviet Union national bandy team represented the Soviet Union in bandy. It was controlled by the Bandy and Field Hockey Federation of the USSR.

Although bandy was a popular sport domestically in the 1920s and 1930s, the Soviet Union did not compete in any international matches back then. Agreements were made to play friendlies against Sweden in the late 1940s, but the plans did not come to realization. However, after having seen Finland, Norway and Sweden playing bandy at the Winter Olympics in Oslo in 1952, the Soviet Union invited these three countries to a four-nation bandy tournament in 1954. This was the first time a Soviet national bandy team met other national bandy teams. The four countries used somewhat different rules prior to this tournament, but the rules were adjusted to be the same for the future.

The Soviet team dominated the Bandy World Championships from its start in 1957 until the Soviet Union was dissolved in 1991, winning the first eleven championships (biennial tournaments from 1961) and winning all but three championships that they competed in. Its place in the championship was then taken over by Russia.

The Soviet Union also won the Rossiya Tournament eight times in ten appearances. In 1992 this tournament was renamed to Russian Government Cup and, replacing the Soviet national bandy team, a bandy team representing the Commonwealth of Independent States made a one-time appearance there, also playing against the new Russia national bandy team.
