= 1989 Bandy World Championship =

16th Bandy World Championship

Tournament details
- Host country: Soviet Union
- Cities: Moscow; Krasnogorsk
- Venues: 2 (in 2 host cities)
- Dates: 29 January – 5 February
- Teams: 8

Final positions
- Champions: Soviet Union (13th title)
- Runners-up: Finland
- Third place: Sweden
- Fourth place: Norway

Tournament statistics
- Games played: 12
- Goals scored: 93 (7.75 per game)

The 1989 Bandy World Championship was the 16th edition of the tournament and was contested by five men's bandy-playing nations. It was held in the Soviet Union from 29 January to 5 February 1989. This was the first ever indoor championships, with most matches played at the Olympic Stadium in Moscow, except for two matches held in Krasnogorsk. The Soviet Union emerged as the champion.

== Participants ==
- Soviet Union
- Finland
- Sweden
- Norway
- United States

=== Premier tour ===
- 29 January

Finland – Sweden 4–2
Soviet Union – Norway 7–0

- 30 January

USA – Norway 1–7

- 31 January

Soviet Union – Sweden 2–3

- 1 February

Norway – Sweden 1–4
Finland – USA 13–0

- 2 February

Norway – Finland 1–4
Soviet Union – USA 14–1

- 3 February

Soviet Union – Finland 6–4
USA – Sweden 0–19

Pos	Team	Pld	W	D	L	GF	GA	GD	Pts
1	Soviet Union	4	3	0	1	29	8	+21	6
2	Finland	4	3	0	1	25	9	+16	6
3	Sweden	4	3	0	1	28	7	+21	6
4	Norway	4	1	0	3	9	16	−7	2
5	United States	4	0	0	4	2	53	−51	0

==== Match for 3rd place ====
- 5 February

Sweden – Norway 6–0

==== Final ====
- 5 February

Soviet Union – Finland 12–2
