= Håkan Karlsson =

Swedish swimmer (born 1970)

Personal information
- Full name: Jonas Klas Håkan Karlsson
- National team: Sweden
- Born: 19 January 1970 (age 56) Kristianstad, Skåne

Sport
- Sport: Swimming
- Strokes: Freestyle
- College team: University of Georgia (U.S.)
Medal record
Men's swimming
Representing Sweden
European Championships (LC)
Bronze medal – third place	1989 Bonn	4×100 m freestyle

Jonas Klas Håkan Karlsson (born 19 January 1970) is a former freestyle swimmer from Sweden. He competed for his native country at the 1992 Summer Olympics in the men's 100-metre freestyle. He was affiliated with the Karlskrona SS club.
