= Bandy World Championship =

Recurring international bandy tournament for men's national teams

- Current season, competition or edition: 2026 Bandy World Championship
- Sport: Bandy
- First season: 1957
- No. of teams: 11 (2026)
- Countries: Worldwide
- Most recent champions: Sweden (15th title)
- Most titles: Sweden (15 titles)
- Website: worldbandy.com

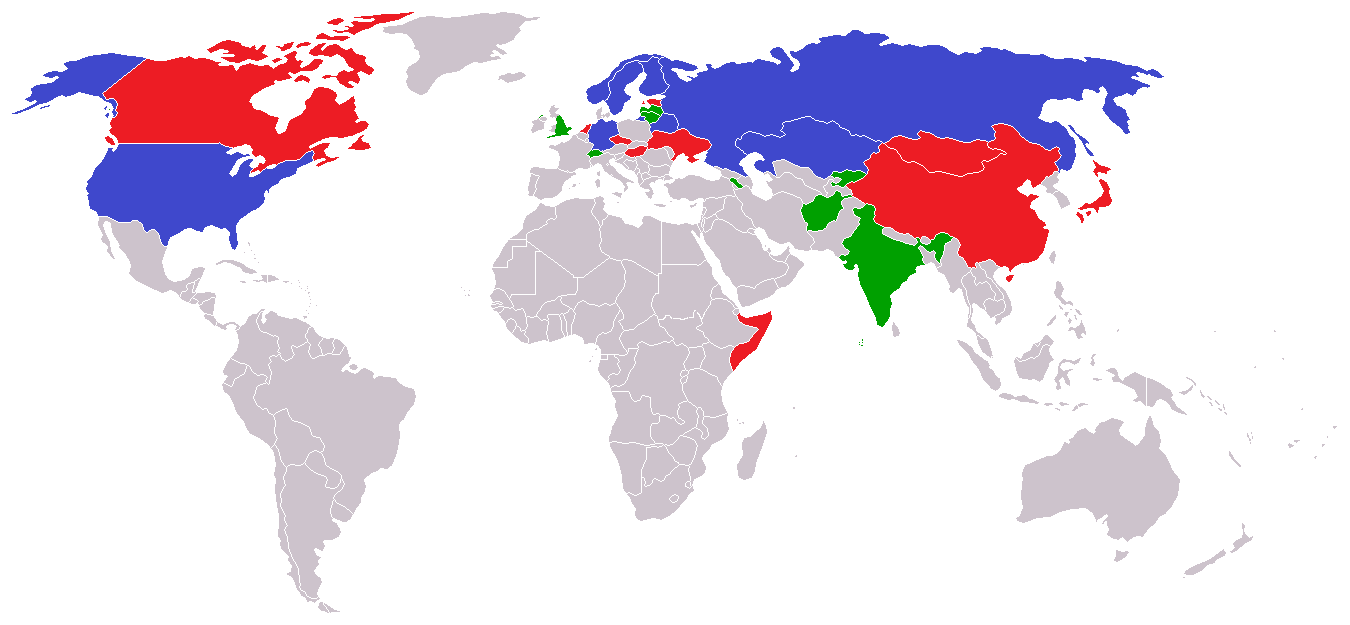
A record twenty countries participated in the World Championships of 2019. Blue means Division A countries, red Division B countries and green the other FIB members. Latvia, which was relegated from Division A in 2016, made a late cancellation in 2017.

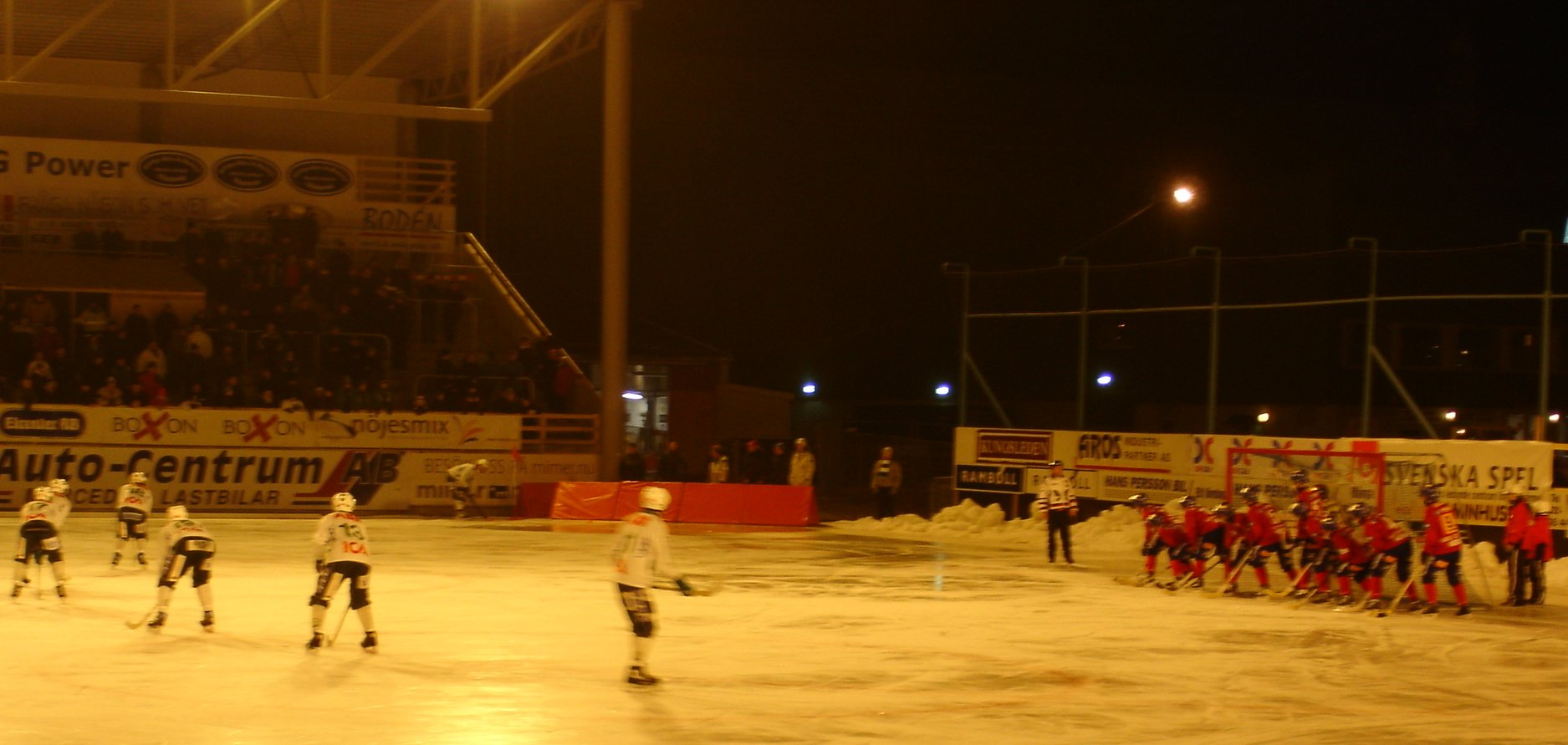
The old outdoor arena in Västerås, Sweden, where Finland won in 2004 for the first and only time.

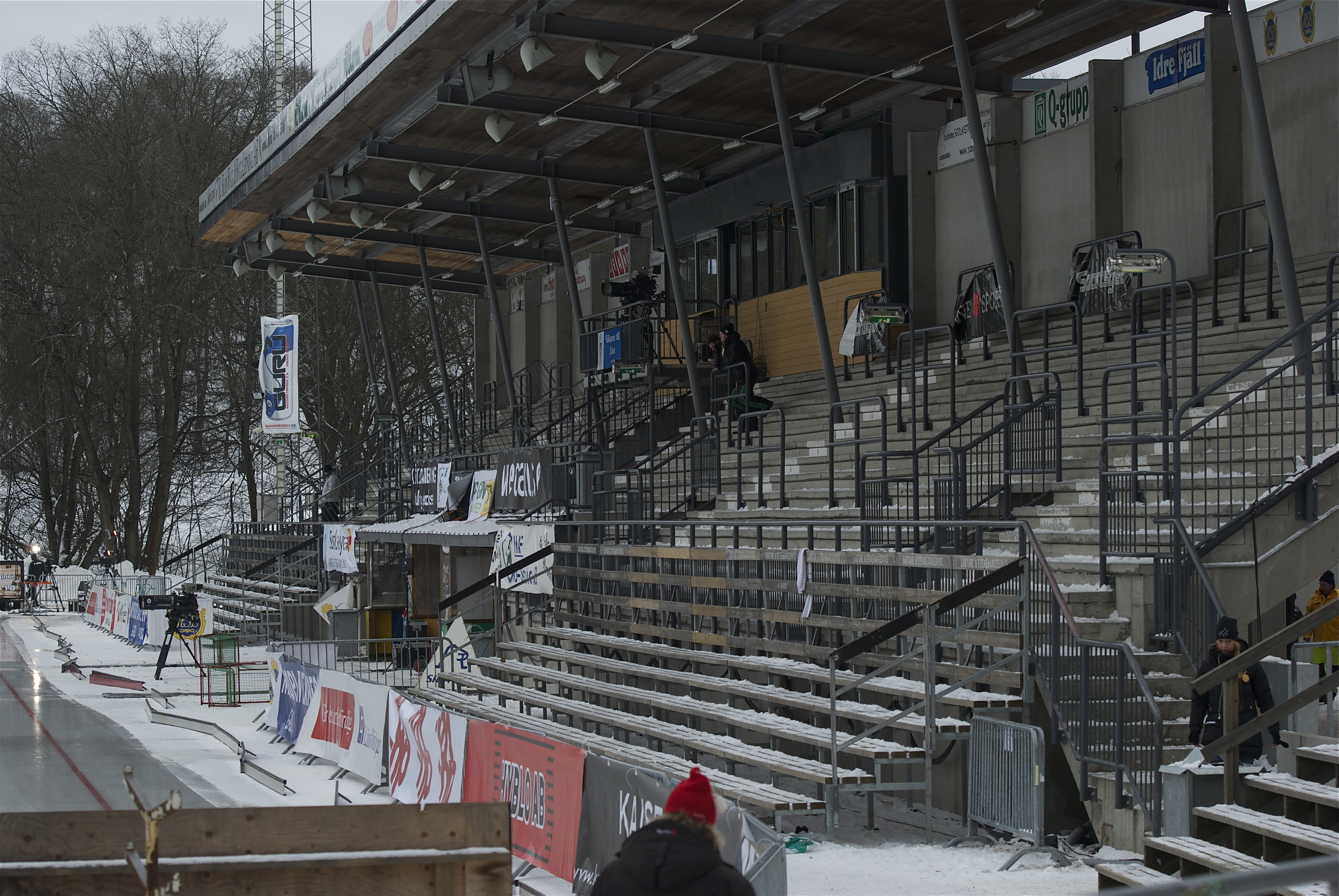
Zinkensdamms IP, Stockholm, Sweden. Venue for the final at the XXVIth championships in 2006

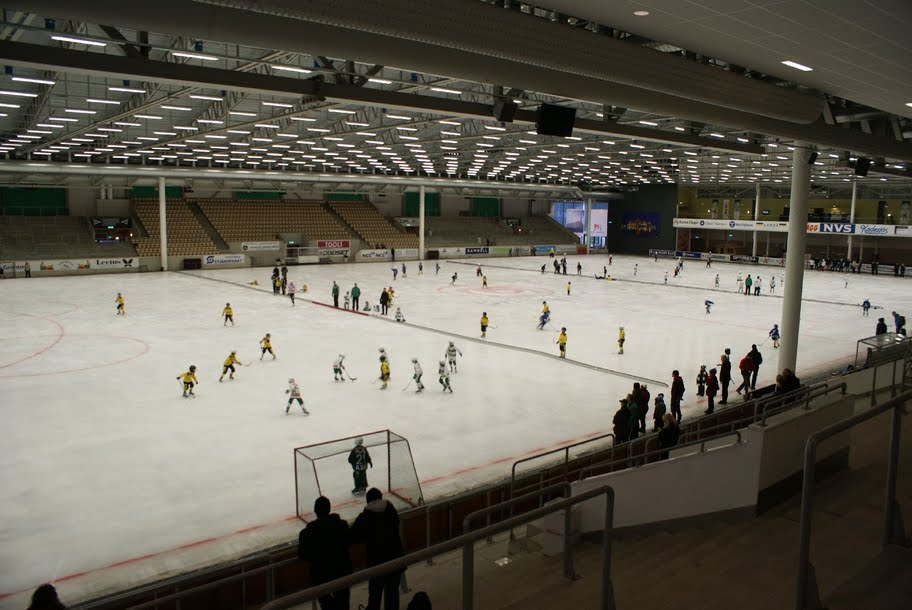
ABB Arena Syd in Västerås, Sweden, host for the XXIXth championships in 2009

The Bandy World Championship is a competition for the men's teams of bandy-playing nations. The tournament is administrated by the Federation of International Bandy. It is distinct from the Bandy World Cup, a club competition, and from the Women's Bandy World Championship. A Youth Bandy World Championship also exists separately from the senior competition and has competitions in both the male and female categories.

The 2020 Bandy World Championship for Division A was scheduled to be played in Irkutsk, Russia in 2020 but was postponed twice due to the COVID-19 pandemic.

The 2021 Bandy World Championship for Division A and B was initially scheduled to be played in Syktyvkar, Russia, but was postponed due to the COVID-19 pandemic. The tournament was rescheduled for Division B to 8–13 March 2022 and for Division A to 27 March–3 April 2022. However, in response to the Russian invasion of Ukraine, Finland and Sweden withdrew from the tournament, which was then cancelled completely. Subsequent tournaments have taken place without the participation of Russia.

== History ==
Although bandy has been played since the 19th century, the first men's world championships were only played as recently as 1957, and the first women's championships not until 2004.

Before this, friendlies had been played regularly between the Nordic countries. A film from British Pathé created in 1935 called "Ice Hockey At Helsingfors On Sleeve As Ice Hockey At Halsingfors News In A Nutshell (1935)" shows an international bandy match between women bandy players from Finland and women bandy players from Sweden being played outdoors at Helsingfors Ice Stadium (Helsinki) in Finland where the narrator corrects the misconception that it is an international women's ice hockey game. Helsingfors is the Swedish name for Helsinki and comes from the name of the surrounding parish, Helsinge (etymological origin of the Finnish name Helsinki) and the rapids (in Swedish: fors), which flowed through the original town.

A bandy tournament for men was held as a demonstration sport at the 1952 Winter Olympics in Oslo, but this had no world championship status. A four-nation tournament in 1954 for men was played in Moscow, this was the first time the Soviet Union met teams from other countries and the first time the new, jointly agreed rules were used, however this was not called a world championship. The international federation was founded in 1955 by the four countries which had men's national bandy teams who had played in Moscow.

The first ever men's Bandy World Championship was organised in 1957 in association with the 50th anniversary of the Ball Association of Finland, which at the time was the governing body of bandy in Finland. It was played at the Helsinki Olympic Stadium.

From 1961 to 2003, the men's championships were played every two years, but since then has been played annually. (During the period 1972–1990, the Rossiya Tournament was held for national teams in the years when there was no world championship. This was always played in the Soviet Union and arranged by newspaper Sovetskaya Rossiya. It was affectionately called "the small world championship".)

== Participating nations ==
For a long time, only four countries competed at the world championships: the Soviet Union, Sweden, Finland and Norway, with the Soviet Union dominating. More countries have joined the tournaments in recent decades, starting with the United States in 1985. The interest in the sport has spread to other parts of Europe, North America and Asia, and the dissolution of the Soviet Union in 1991 also opened the way for separate national teams from the former Soviet republics. Somalia became the first team from Africa to compete, in the 2014 tournament in Irkutsk. The record number of participants is 20, set in 2019.

Denmark, Switzerland, Armenia and Poland are countries that a few years ago expressed interest in participating in future tournaments. Denmark and Poland have left FIB, while Switzerland debuted in the 2019 edition, as did Great Britain. Armenia wished to participate in the 2011, but was not allowed to, as the tournament format at the time only allowed twelve teams and several more wanted to come. Of the countries which still have not taken part, India was also denied in 2011. Most probably also Lithuania. The reason for the 2011 tournament having only eleven teams, was a late cancellation from Australia, another country no longer an FIB member.

With more nations competing, Group B was created in 1991. In 2012 there was a Group C for the first time as 14 countries participated. Group C was abolished in 2013, when instead two sub-groups of Group B were created. In 2014 there were two sub-groups also in Group A, increasing the number of teams in that division from six to eight. The number of groups is not fixed, it is changed from year to year and there are discussions about reinstating a Group C. Japan and Kyrgyzstan attended their first World Championships in 2012, Ukraine joined in 2013, Germany and Somalia made their debuts in 2014, China in 2015, and the Czech Republic in 2016. Russia, Finland, Sweden, Kazakhstan, Norway, USA and Belarus usually play in group A. Until 2011, the best team in group B Went into a playoff match with the team which came bottom of the A-group, replacing them if they won. In 2004 the B-pool was played in a location separate from group A for the first time, at the City Park Ice Rink in Budapest. In 2013 this happened again as Vetlanda hosted the B-pool, whereas Vänersborg was the main venue of the A-pool with three matches played at other locations, Trollhättan, Gothenburg and Oslo. In 2015 and 2016 the tournaments were separated in time while in the same cities. The Division B matches are shorter in time, except for the end matches.

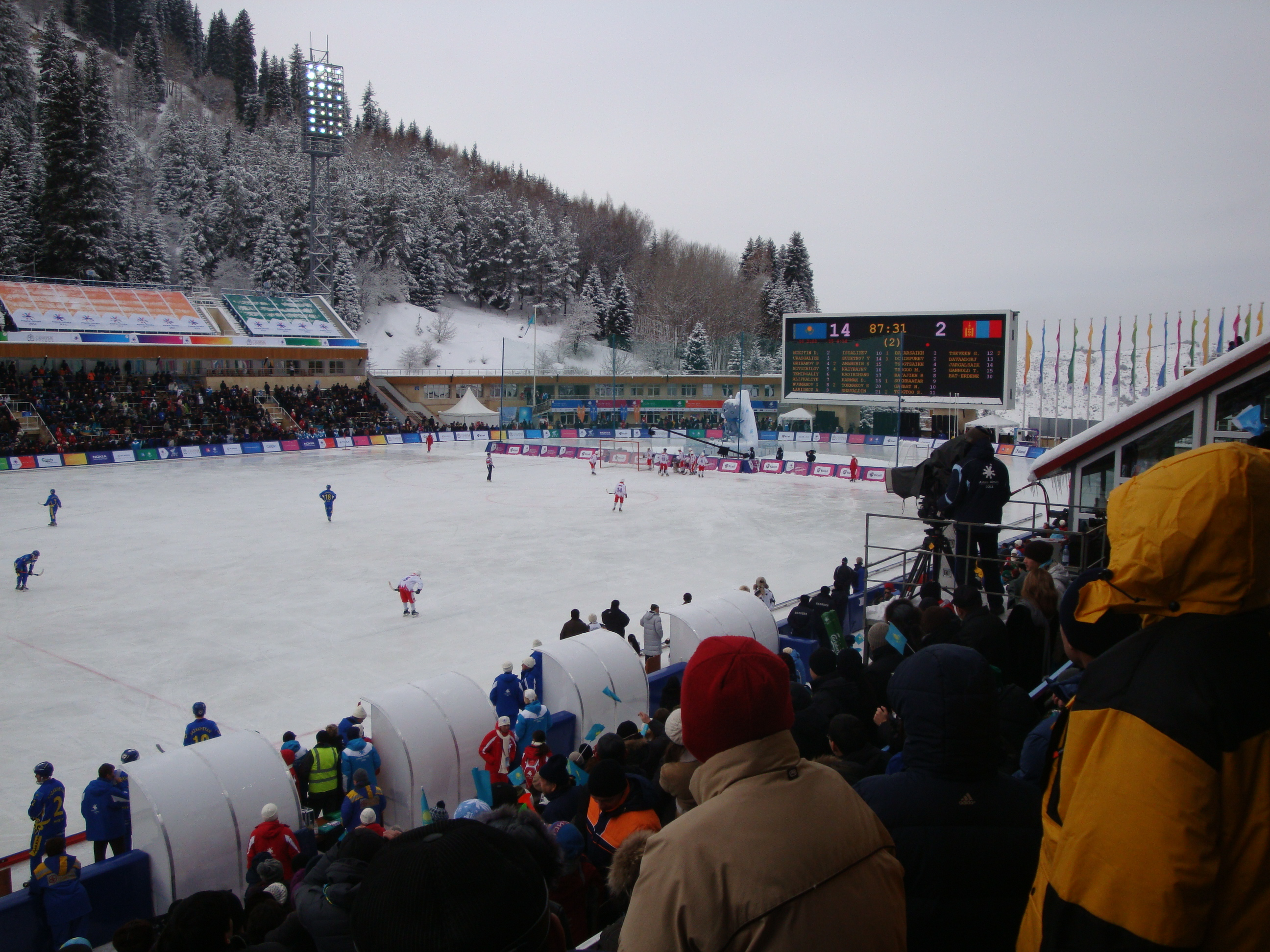
Medeu was the main arena for the XXXIInd championships in 2012. Here the final of the 2011 Asian Winter Games.

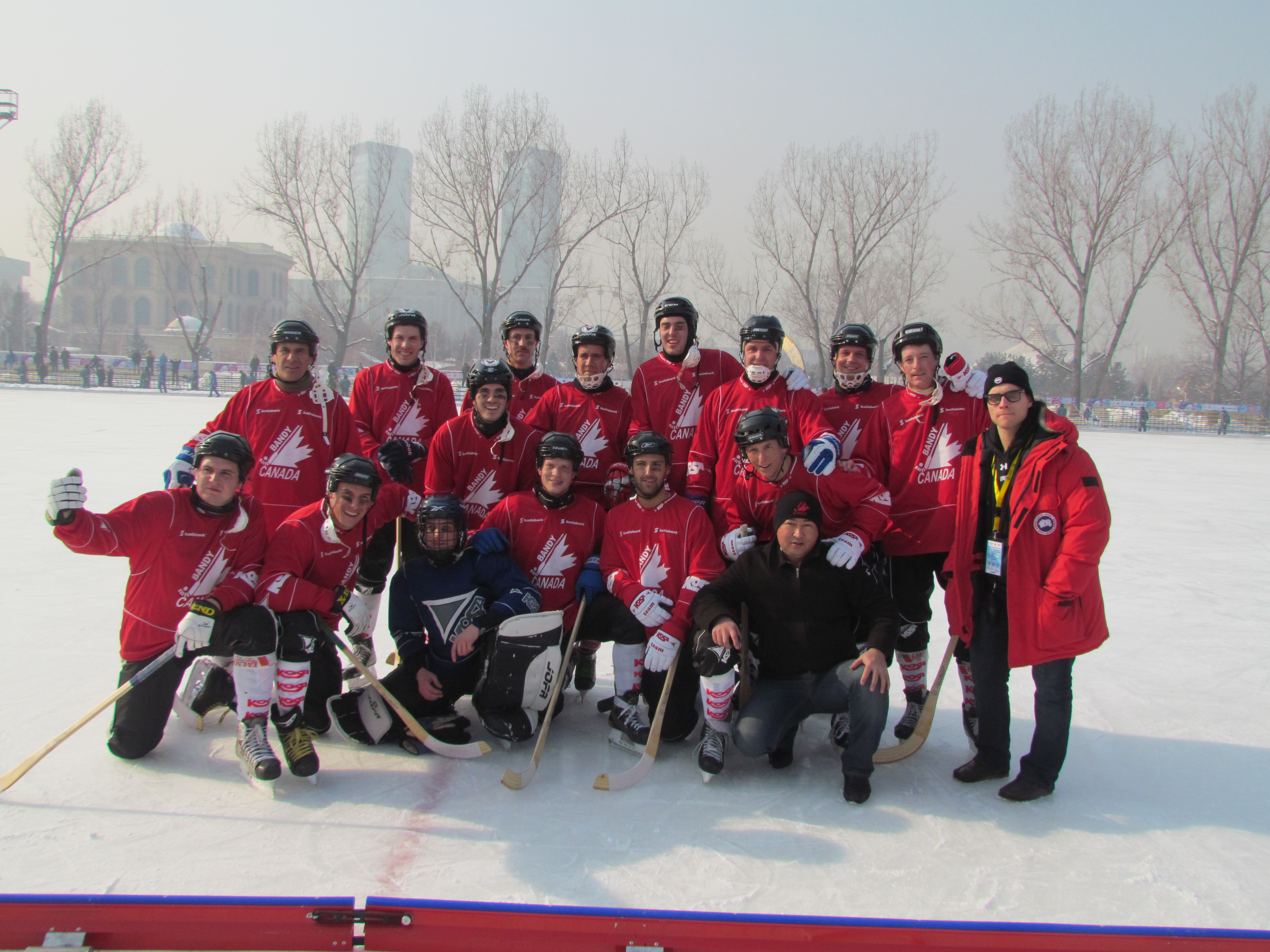
The reserve field of Almaty Central Stadium was the venue for Division B and C in 2012. Here Canada.

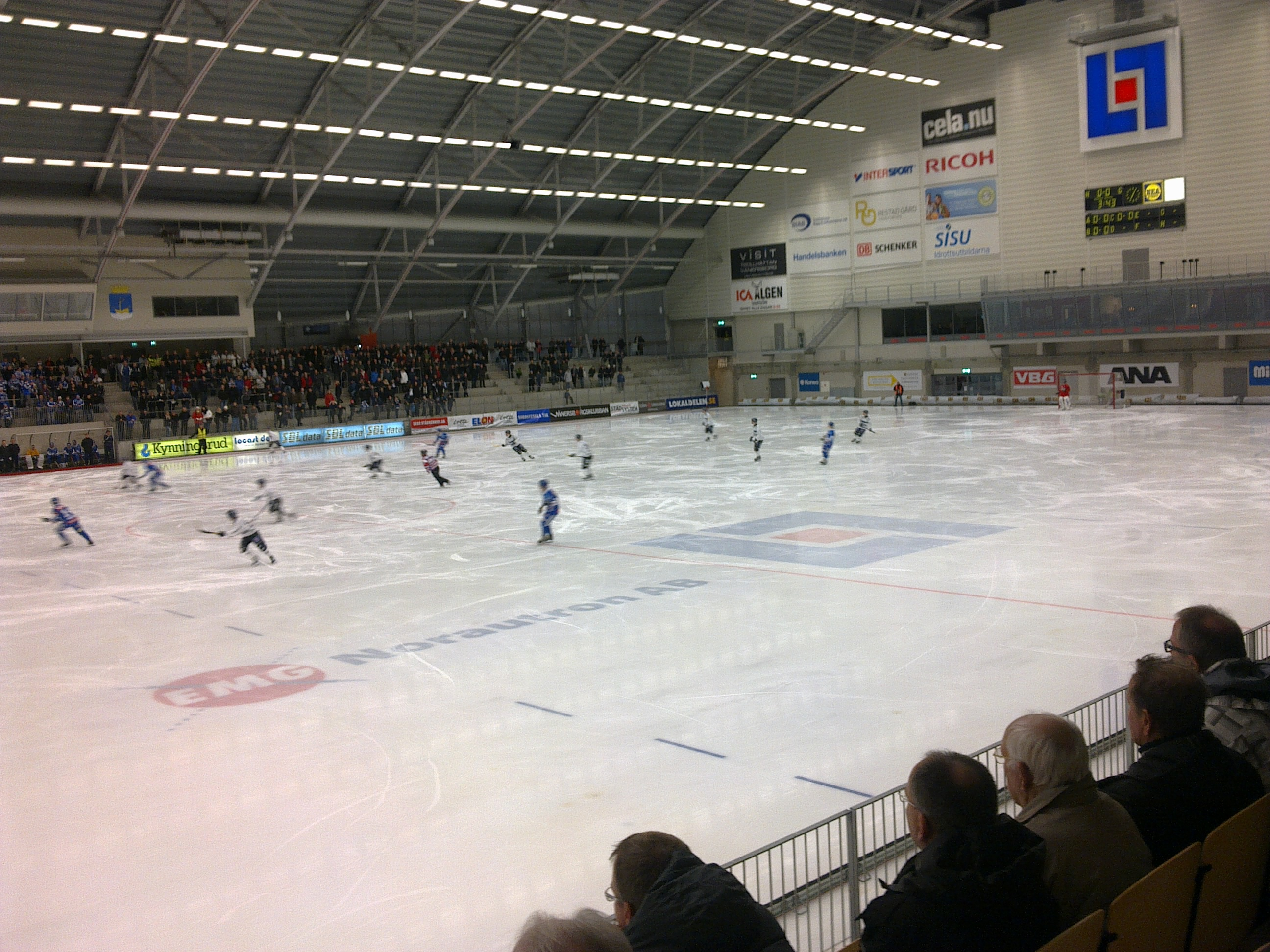
Arena Vänersborg in Sweden, the main venue of the XXXIIIrd championship, held in 2013

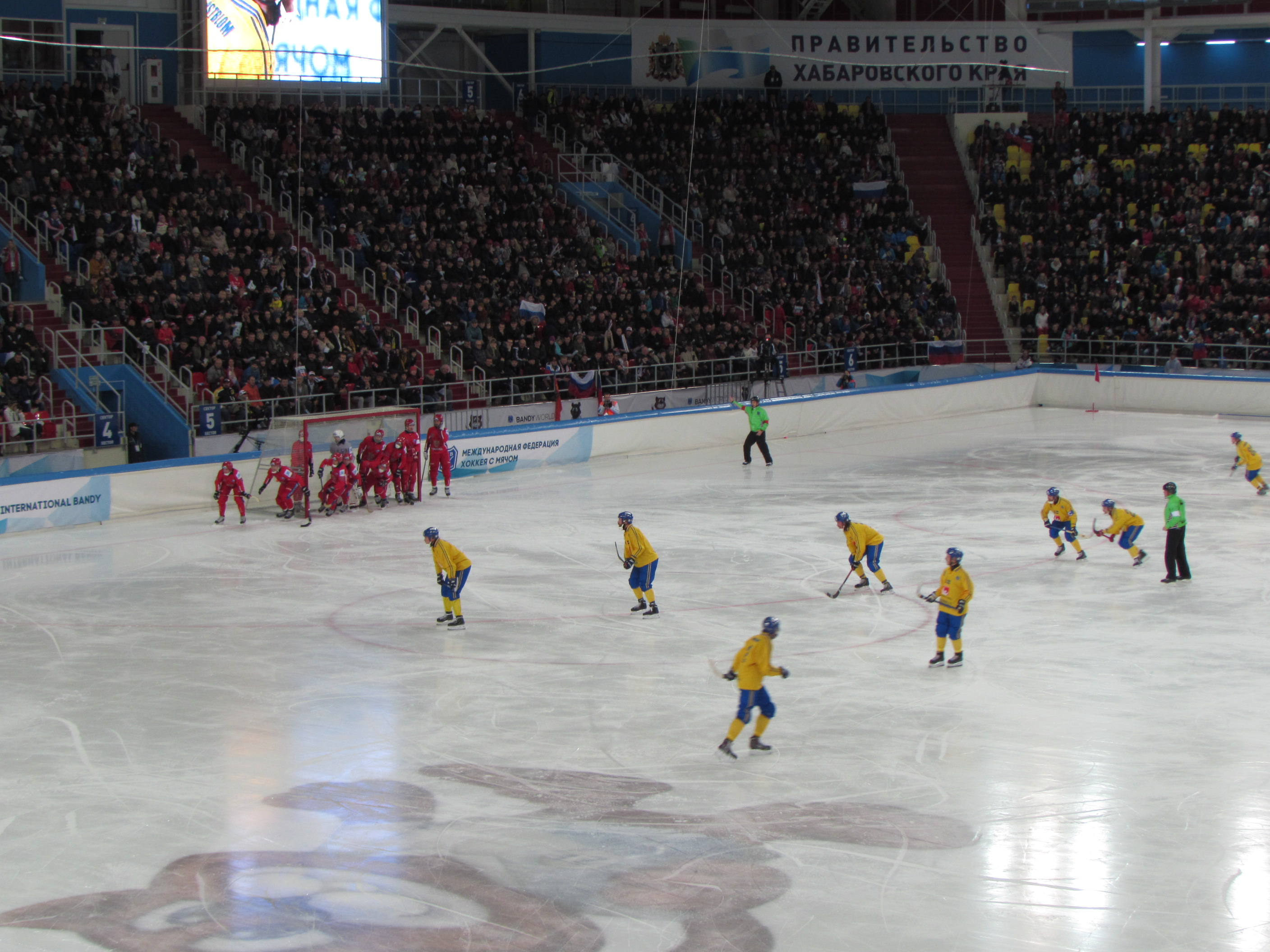
Arena Yerofey, the final of the XXXVth championship in 2015

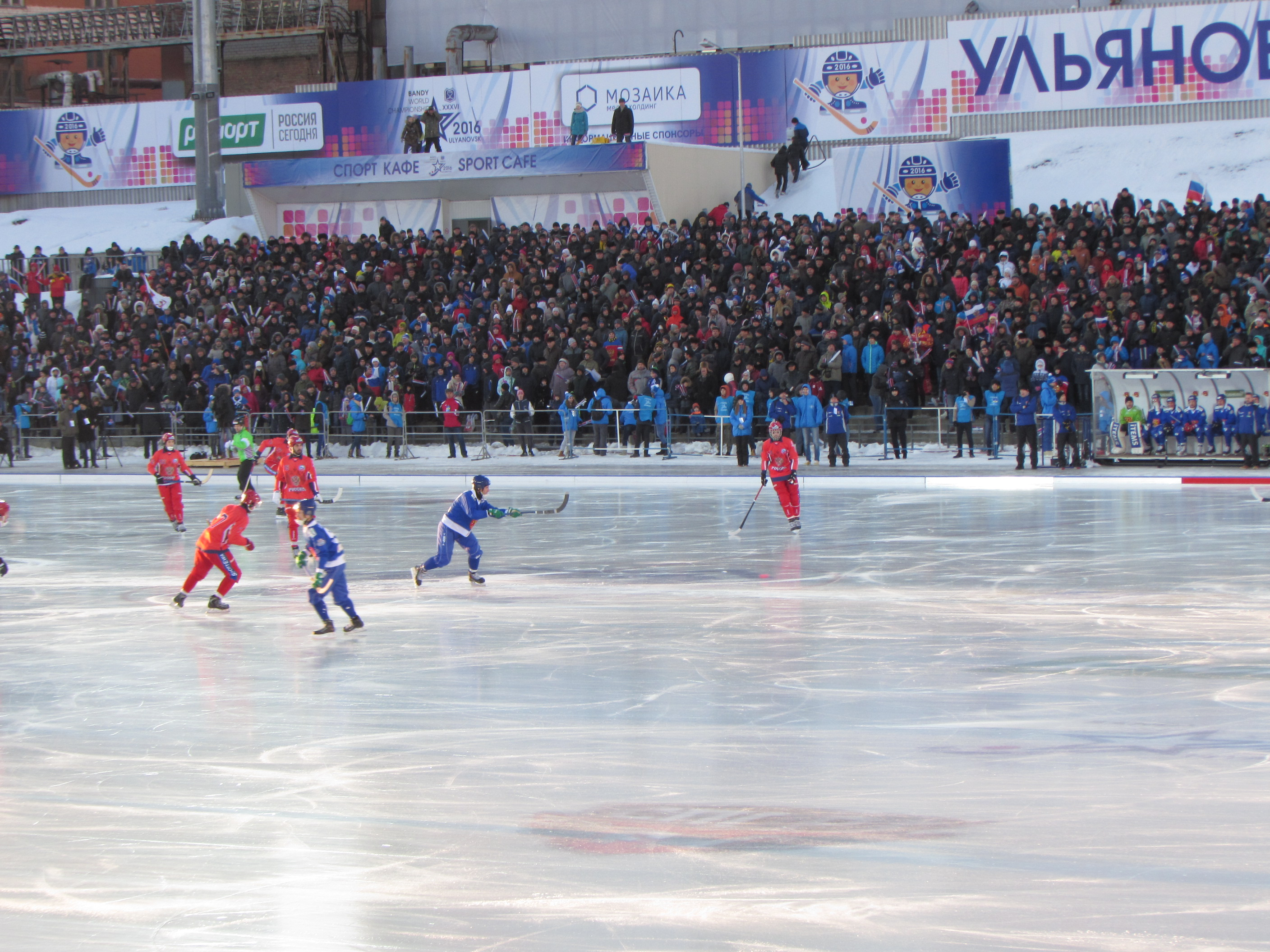
Trud Stadium, the final of the XXXVIth championship in 2016

=== Participation details ===
1957-2001

Team	57	61	63	65	67	69	71	73	75	77	79	81	83	85	87	89	91	93	95	97	99	01
Belarus	part of Soviet Union																	–	–	–	–	7th
Canada	–	–	–	–	–	–	–	–	–	–	–	–	–	–	–	–	6th	6th	7th	7th	–	–
Finland	2nd	3rd	2nd	4th	2nd	3rd	3rd	3rd	3rd	3rd	3rd	3rd	3rd	3rd	2nd	2nd	3rd	4th	3rd	3rd	2nd	3rd
Hungary	–	–	–	–	–	–	–	–	–	–	–	–	–	–	–	–	8th	7th	8th	8th	–	–
Kazakhstan	part of Soviet Union																	–	4th	4th	5th	4th
Netherlands	–	–	–	–	–	–	–	–	–	–	–	–	–	–	–	–	7th	8th	–	9th	–	–
Norway	–	4th	4th	2nd	4th	–	4th	4th	4th	4th	4th	4th	4th	4th	4th	4th	4th	3rd	5th	5th	4th	5th
Russia	see Soviet Union																	2nd	2nd	2nd	1st	1st
Soviet Union	1st	1st	1st	1st	1st	1st	1st	1st	1st	1st	1st	2nd	2nd	1st	3rd	1st	1st	defunct				
Sweden	3rd	2nd	3rd	3rd	3rd	2nd	2nd	2nd	2nd	2nd	2nd	1st	1st	2nd	1st	3rd	2nd	1st	1st	1st	3rd	2nd
United States	–	–	–	–	–	–	–	–	–	–	–	–	–	5th	5th	5th	5th	5th	6th	6th	6th	6th
Total teams	3	4	4	4	4	3	4	4	4	4	4	4	4	5	5	5	8	8	8	9	6	7

2003-2026

Team	03	04	05	06	07	08	09	10	11	12	13	14	15	16	17	18	19	20	22	23	25	26	Total
Belarus	6th	7th	6th	6th	6th	6th	6th	–	7th	7th	6th	7th	6th	6th	8th	–	–	–	–	–	–	–	15
Canada	–	9th	8th	8th	–	8th	8th	7th	8th	8th	8th	8th	–	–	9th	–	14th	–	–	–	–	–	16
China	–	–	–	–	–	–	–	–	–	–	–	–	15th	16th	17th	12th	18th	–	–	–	–	–	5
Czech Republic	–	–	–	–	–	–	–	–	–	–	–	–	–	15th	16th	–	15th	16th	–	10th	–	9th	6
Germany	–	–	–	–	–	–	–	–	–	–	–	15th	12th	9th	7th	7th	7th	x	–	7th	7th	8th	9
Estonia	8th	10th	10th	12th	12th	10th	9th	–	–	12th	11th	10th	9th	DSQ	14th	11th	9th	x	–	–	–	–	15
Finland	4th	1st	4th	3rd	3rd	3rd	3rd	3rd	2nd	4th	4th	4th	4th	2nd	3rd	3rd	3rd	x	–	2nd	2nd	2nd	42
Great Britain	–	–	–	–	–	–	–	–	–	–	–	–	–	–	–	–	10th	–	–	–	8th	7th	3
Hungary	–	8th	11th	9th	10th	13th	13th	10th	10th	9th	10th	11th	10th	10th	10th	8th	11th	9th	–	6th	5th	6th	24
Japan	–	–	–	–	–	–	–	–	–	13th	13th	12th	13th	13th	12th	10th	12th	15th	–	–	–	–	9
Kazakhstan	3rd	4th	3rd	4th	4th	4th	4th	4th	4th	3rd	3rd	3rd	3rd	4th	5th	4th	4th	x	–	4th	–	–	22
Kyrgyzstan	–	–	–	–	–	–	–	–	–	14th	–	–	–	–	–	–	–	–	–	–	–	–	1
Latvia	–	–	–	–	8th	9th	10th	8th	9th	10th	9th	9th	7th	8th	–	–	13th	14th	–	–	–	–	12
Mongolia	–	–	–	11th	11th	12th	12th	11th	–	–	–	14th	14th	12th	11th	13th	–	12th	–	–	–	–	11
Netherlands	9th	11th	9th	10th	9th	11th	11th	9th	11th	11th	12th	13th	11th	14th	15th	9th	8th	13th	–	8th	6th	5th	24
Norway	5th	5th	5th	5th	5th	5th	5th	5th	5th	5th	5th	5th	5th	5th	4th	6th	5th	x	–	3rd	3rd	3rd	40
Russia	2nd	3rd	2nd	1st	1st	1st	2nd	2nd	1st	2nd	1st	1st	1st	1st	2nd	1st	1st	x	–	–	–	–	22
Slovakia	–	–	–	–	–	–	–	–	–	–	–	–	–	–	–	15th	16th	11th	–	9th	10th	–	5
Somalia	–	–	–	–	–	–	–	–	–	–	–	17th	16th	17th	18th	16th	20th	18th	–	–	–	–	7
Sweden	1st	2nd	1st	2nd	2nd	2nd	1st	1st	3rd	1st	2nd	2nd	2nd	3rd	1st	2nd	2nd	x	–	1st	1st	1st	42
Switzerland	–	–	–	–	–	–	–	–	–	–	–	–	–	–	–	–	19th	17th	–	11th	9th	11th	5
Ukraine	–	–	–	–	–	–	–	–	–	–	14th	16th	–	11th	13th	14th	17th	10th	–	–	–	10th	8
United States	7th	6th	7th	7th	7th	7th	7th	6th	6th	6th	7th	6th	8th	7th	6th	5th	6th	x	–	5th	4th	4th	29
Total teams	9	11	11	12	12	13	13	11	11	14	14	17	16	18	18	16	20	10 (18*)	–	11	10	11	

*18 teams were enrolled in 2020, but only 10 (the B division) could participate (teams marked with "x" could not participate).

== Debut of national teams ==
Year	Debuting teams			Successor teams
Year	Teams	No.	Cum.	Successor teams
1957	Finland, Soviet Union, Sweden	3	3	
1961	Norway	1	4	
1963	-	0	4	
1965	-	0	4	
1967	-	0	4	
1969	-	0	4	
1971	-	0	4	
1973	-	0	4	
1975	-	0	4	
1977	-	0	4	
1979	-	0	4	
1981	-	0	4	
1983	-	0	4	
1985	United States	1	5	
1987	-	0	5	
1989	-	0	5	
1991	Canada, Hungary, Netherlands	3	8	
1993	Russia	0	8	Soviet Union
1995	Kazakhstan	1	9	
1997	-	0	9	
1999	-	0	9	
2001	Belarus	1	10	
2003	Estonia	1	11	
2004	-	0	11	
2005	-	0	11	
2006	Mongolia	1	12	
2007	Latvia	1	13	
2008	-	0	13	
2009	-	0	13	
2010	-	0	13	
2011	-	0	13	
2012	Japan, Kyrgyzstan	2	15	
2013	Ukraine	1	16	
2014	Somalia, Germany	2	18	
2015	China	1	19	
2016	Czech Republic	1	20	
2017	-	0	20	
2018	Slovakia	1	21	
2019	Great Britain, Switzerland	2	23	
2020-2022	-	0	23	
2023	-	0	23	
2025	-	0	23	
2026	-	0	23	

== Competition format ==
Originally, the competition was played as an all-meet-all round-robin tournament. Starting in 1983, semifinals and a final was added to follow the round-robin stage.

When the number of participating nations increased, the championship was split up in two groups from 2003 onwards, A and B, with the better teams in Group A. The winner of Group B for some years played a game against the least successful team of Group A to determine qualification for Group A for next year, but in 2016, 2017, and 2018 winning Group B has been directly qualifying for group A for the following year while the last placed team of Group A is automatically relegated to Group B.

== Broadcasting ==
The interest is biggest in Sweden, Finland and Russia. On several occasions it was shown on Eurosport 2.

The games are also viewable via online streaming.

== Results ==
No.	Year	Host	Final venue (host city) *	Gold medal	Result	Silver medal	Bronze medal	Result	Fourth place	Teams
I	1957; Details	Finland	Olympic Stadium (Helsinki)	Soviet Union	Round-robin (6–1)	Finland	Sweden	Round-robin	Only three teams participated	3
II	1961; Details	Norway	Bislett Stadium (Oslo)	Soviet Union	Round-robin (2–1)	Sweden	Finland	Round-robin (4–3)	Norway	4
III	1963; Details	Sweden	Skogsvallen (Nässjö)	Soviet Union	Round-robin (6–1)	Finland	Sweden	Round-robin (12–0)	Norway	4
IV	1965; Details	Soviet Union	Central Stadium (Sverdlovsk)	Soviet Union	Round-robin (4–0)	Norway	Sweden	Round-robin (1–2)	Finland	4
V	1967; Details	Finland	Raatti Stadium (Oulu)	Soviet Union	Round-robin (1–1)	Finland	Sweden	Round-robin (2–1)	Norway	4
VI	1969; Details	Sweden	Vinterstadion (Örebro) and Studenternas IP (Uppsala)	Soviet Union	Round-robin (4–2, 2–1)	Sweden	Finland	Round-robin	Only three teams participated	3
VII	1971; Details	Sweden	Vinterstadion (Örebro) and Söderstadion (Stockholm)	Soviet Union	Round-robin (2–2, 2–1)	Sweden	Finland	Round-robin (6–1, 7–1)	Norway	4
VIII	1973; Details	Soviet Union	Central Dynamo Stadium (Moscow)	Soviet Union	Round-robin (5–1, 1–0)	Sweden	Finland	Round-robin (3–2, 3–4)	Norway	4
IX	1975; Details	Finland	Pohjan stadion (Tornio) and Hänninhauta (Mikkeli)	Soviet Union	Round-robin (1–3, 7–2)	Sweden	Finland	Round-robin (2–1, 2–2)	Norway	4
X	1977; Details	Norway	Valle Hovin (Oslo) and Marienlyst Stadion (Drammen)	Soviet Union	Round-robin (2–3, 3–2)	Sweden	Finland	Round-robin (5–1, 2–4)	Norway	4
XI	1979; Details	Sweden	Vänersborgs isstadion (Vänersborg) and Spånga IP (Stockholm)	Soviet Union	Round-robin (4–3, 4–2)	Sweden	Finland	Round-robin (8–2, 6–2)	Norway	4
XII	1981; Details	Soviet Union	Central Lenin Stadium (Khabarovsk)	Sweden	Round-robin (6–1, 1–3)	Soviet Union	Finland	Round-robin (6–1, 5–1)	Norway	4
XIII	1983; Details	Finland	Oulunkylä Ice Rink (Helsinki)	Sweden	9–3	Soviet Union	Finland	4–1	Norway	4
XIV	1985; Details	Norway	Valle Hovin (Oslo)	Soviet Union	5–4 (a.e.t.)	Sweden	Finland	6–2	Norway	5
XV	1987; Details	Sweden	Söderstadion (Stockholm)	Sweden	7–2	Finland	Soviet Union	11–3	Norway	5
XVI	1989; Details	Soviet Union	Olympic Stadium (Moscow)	Soviet Union	12–2	Finland	Sweden	6–0	Norway	5
XVII	1991; Details	Finland	Oulunkylä Ice Rink (Helsinki)	Soviet Union	4–3	Sweden	Finland	8–0	Norway	8
XVIII	1993; Details	Norway	Hamar Olympic Hall (Hamar)	Sweden	8–0	Russia	Norway	5–3	Finland	8
XIX	1995; Details	United States	John Rose Minnesota Oval (Roseville)	Sweden	6–4	Russia	Finland	3–2	Kazakhstan	8
XX	1997; Details	Sweden	Rocklunda IP (Västerås)	Sweden	10–5	Russia	Finland	9–3	Kazakhstan	9
XXI	1999; Details	Russia	Trud Stadium (Arkhangelsk)	Russia	5–0	Finland	Sweden	9–1	Norway	6
XXII	2001; Details	Finland; Sweden	Raksila Ice Rink (Oulu)	Russia	6–1	Sweden	Finland	3–2	Kazakhstan	7
XXIII	2003; Details	Russia	Trud Stadium (Arkhangelsk)	Sweden	5–4	Russia	Kazakhstan	4–1	Finland	9
XXIV	2004; Details	Sweden; Hungary	Rocklunda IP (Västerås)	Finland	5–4 (a.e.t.)	Sweden	Russia	5–2	Kazakhstan	11
XXV	2005; Details	Russia	Trudovye Rezervy Stadium (Kazan)	Sweden	5–2	Russia	Kazakhstan	5–3	Finland	11
XXVI	2006; Details	Sweden	Zinkensdamms IP (Stockholm)	Russia	3–2	Sweden	Finland	7–4	Kazakhstan	12
XXVII	2007; Details	Russia	Khimik Stadium (Kemerovo)	Russia	3–1	Sweden	Finland	5–4 (a.e.t.)	Kazakhstan	12
XXVIII	2008; Details	Russia	Olympic Stadium (Moscow)	Russia	6–1	Sweden	Finland	8–3	Kazakhstan	13
XXIX	2009; Details	Sweden	ABB Arena South (Västerås)	Sweden	6–1	Russia	Finland	7–3	Kazakhstan	13
XXX	2010; Details	Russia	Ice Palace Krylatskoye (Moscow)	Sweden	6–5 (a.e.t.)	Russia	Finland	4–3 (a.e.t.)	Kazakhstan	11
XXXI	2011; Details	Russia	Trudovye Rezervy Stadium (Kazan)	Russia	6–1	Finland	Sweden	14–3	Kazakhstan	11
XXXII	2012; Details	Kazakhstan	Medeu (Almaty)	Sweden	5–4	Russia	Kazakhstan	10–5	Finland	14
XXXIII	2013; Details	Sweden; Norway	Arena Vänersborg (Vänersborg)	Russia	4–3	Sweden	Kazakhstan	6–3	Finland	14
XXXIV	2014; Details	Russia	Trud Stadium (Irkutsk)	Russia	3–2	Sweden	Kazakhstan	5–3	Finland	17
XXXV	2015; Details	Russia	Arena Yerofey (Khabarovsk)	Russia	5–3	Sweden	Kazakhstan	8–6	Finland	16
XXXVI	2016; Details	Russia	Trud Stadium (Ulyanovsk)	Russia	6–1	Finland	Sweden	4–0	Kazakhstan	18
XXXVII	2017; Details	Sweden	Göransson Arena (Sandviken)	Sweden	4–3	Russia	Finland	11–1	Norway	18
XXXVIII	2018; Details	Russia; China	Arena Yerofey (Khabarovsk)	Russia	5–4	Sweden	Finland	8–4	Kazakhstan	16
XXXIX	2019; Details	Sweden	Arena Vänersborg (Vänersborg)	Russia	6–5 (a.e.t.)	Sweden	Finland	8–2	Kazakhstan	20
XL	2020; Details	Russia	Division A cancelled							10 (18**)
XLI	2022; Details	Russia	Cancelled							-
XLII	2023; Details	Sweden	Eriksson Arena (Växjö)	Sweden	3–1	Finland	Norway	5–1	Kazakhstan	11
XLIII	2025; Details	Sweden	Sparbanken Lidköping Arena (Lidköping)	Sweden	5–3	Finland	Norway	12–1	United States	10
XLIV	2026; Detalis	Finland	Narukerä Ice Rink (Pori)	Sweden	9–1	Finland	Norway	8–3	United States	11

* For 1959–1981 championships, there are listed venues (host cities) of the decisive matches of round-robin tournaments (i.e. matches between champions and runners-up for each tournament), not final matches.
** 18 teams were enrolled in 2020, but only 10 (the B division) could participate.

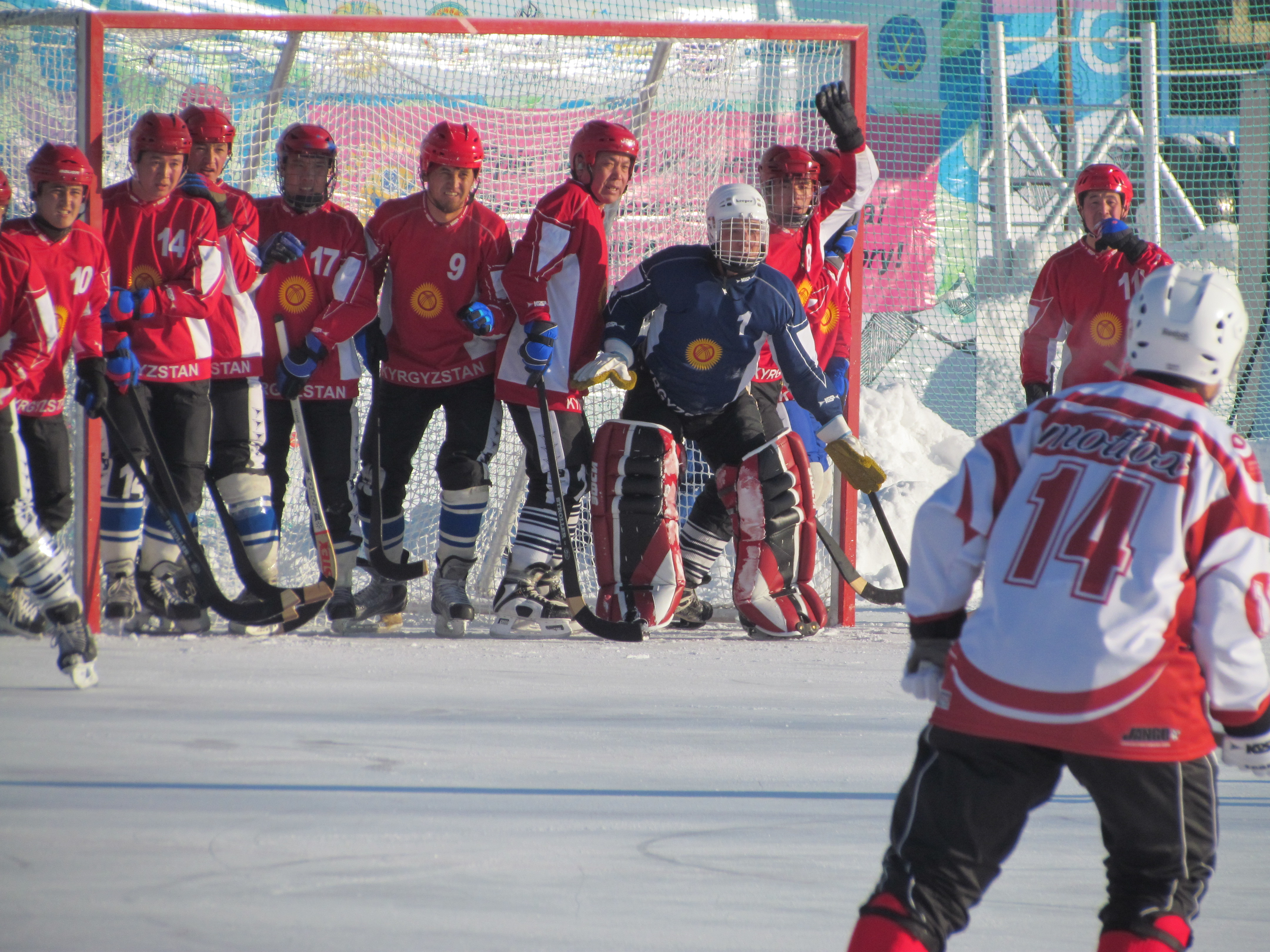
Kyrgyzstan and Japan were the newcomers in 2012. Here, the Kyrgyzstan team defend their goal when Japan is about to make a corner stroke. Kyrgyzstan has yet to make another world championship appearance.

=== Medal table ===
Countries in italics no longer compete at the World Championships.

Rank	Nation	Gold	Silver	Bronze	Total
1	Sweden	15	19	8	42
2	Soviet Union	14	2	1	17
3	Russia	12	9	1	22
4	Finland	1	11	22	34
5	Norway	0	1	4	5
6	Kazakhstan	0	0	6	6
Totals (6 entries)		42	42	42	126

=== Consecutive wins ===
The most consecutive gold medals were won by the Soviet Union with 11. Russia has won four consecutive gold medals and Sweden has won three consecutive gold medals.

== Final arenas (since 1983) ==
Until 1981, the championship was always decided by round-robin games, so only since 1983 there have been designated venues for the championship final game.

No.	Times	Country	Arena	City	Years	Note
1	2	Finland	Oulunkylä Ice Rink	Helsinki	1983, 1991	
1	2	Russia	Trud Stadium	Arkhangelsk	1999, 2003	
1	2	Sweden	Rocklunda IP	Västerås	1997, 2004	
1	2	Russia	Olympic Stadium	Moscow	1989, 2008	Indoor arena
1	2	Russia	Trudovye Rezervy Stadium	Kazan	2005, 2011	
1	2	Russia	Arena Yerofey	Khabarovsk	2015, 2018	Indoor arena
1	2	Sweden	Arena Vänersborg	Vänersborg	2013, 2019	Indoor arena
8	1	Norway	Valle Hovin	Oslo	1985	
8	1	Sweden	Söderstadion	Stockholm	1987	
8	1	Norway	Hamar Olympic Hall	Hamar	1993	Indoor arena
8	1	United States	John Rose Minnesota Oval	Roseville	1995	
8	1	Finland	Raksila Ice Rink	Oulu	2001	
8	1	Sweden	Zinkensdamms IP	Stockholm	2006	
8	1	Russia	Khimik Stadium	Kemerovo	2007	
8	1	Sweden	ABB Arena South	Västerås	2009	Indoor arena
8	1	Russia	Ice Palace Krylatskoye	Moscow	2010	Indoor arena
8	1	Kazakhstan	Medeu	Almaty	2012	
8	1	Russia	Trud Stadium	Irkutsk	2014	
8	1	Russia	Trud Stadium	Ulyanovsk	2016	
8	1	Sweden	Göransson Arena	Sandviken	2017	Indoor arena
8	1	Sweden	Eriksson Arena	Växjö	2023	Indoor arena
8	1	Sweden	Sparbanken Lidköping Arena	Lidköping	2025	Indoor arena
8	1	Finland	Narukerä Ice Rink	Pori	2026	
