= Åsen, Oslo =

Neighbourhood in Oslo, Norway

Coordinates: 59°56′26″N 10°46′31″E

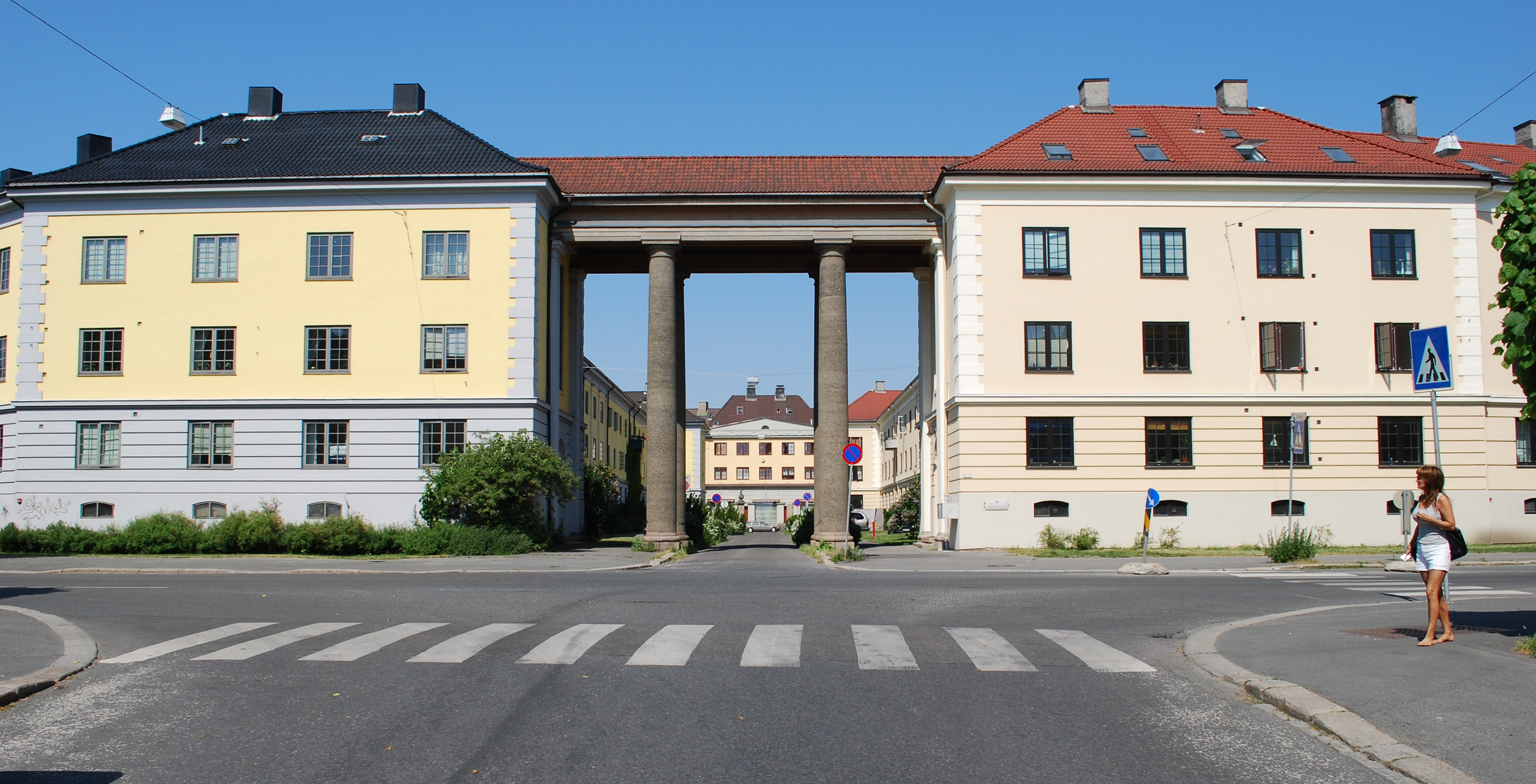
Buildings at Nordre Åsen (Northern Åsen).

Åsen is a neighborhood divided between the boroughs of Sagene and Nordre Aker in Oslo, Norway.

The neighbourhood is named after the old farm Åsen (Norse Ósin, from originally *Ásvin). The first element is áss m 'mountain ridge' (here referring to Grefsenåsen), the last element is vin f 'meadow'.

The name is often misunderstood as åsen, the finite form of ås (the modern Norwegian form of áss), and is then wrongly pronounced with accent 1 - but the correct pronunciation is with accent 2.

Åsen farm was owned by the Catholic Church until the Reformation, when it came on private hands. It was split in three in 1810. When the Gjøvik Line was constructed to run through Åsen's farmlands, and it was parceled out to residencies. The municipality erected residential complexes there in the 1920s and 1930s, supplemented by blocks in the late 1940s.

At Nordre Åsen there is a sports field, which is a home field of Skeid Fotball and Skeid Bandy.
