= Russian Government Cup =

International bandy tournament played in Russia

- Status: defunct
- Genre: bandy
- Frequency: biannually
- Country: Russia
- Inaugurated: 1972
- Most recent: 2012

The Russian Government Cup was a tournament for national teams in bandy, arranged in Russia every other year from 1972 until 2012. The cup has not been played since 2012.

When the Bandy World Championships were held every other year, this tournament was held in around the same time of the year (February/March) in the years when there was no World Championships. Starting in 2003, it was arranged in December instead.

== History ==
Besides the national teams, there have sometimes been irregular teams representing federation subjects of Russia (earlier the USSR) or a "Russia no. 2" team – these are written with italics below and marked with two flags if they are federation subjects – or Russian club teams, to fill out the tournament. Youth national teams have also occasionally been invited.

It was called the Rossiya Tournament until 1990, because it was arranged by the newspaper Sovetskaya Rossiya. Since then, it was instead being arranged by the Russian government, hence the latter name.

== Tournaments ==
| Year | Venue(s) | Winner | Second place | Third place | Fourth place |
|---|---|---|---|---|---|
| 1972; Details | Ulyanovsk | Soviet Union | Sweden | Finland | Norway |
| 1974; Details | Arkhangelsk | Sweden | Soviet Union | Finland | Norway |
| 1976; Details | Khabarovsk | Soviet Union | Sweden | Finland | Norway |
| 1978; Details | Kemerovo | Soviet Union | Finland | Sweden | Norway |
| 1980; Details | Syktyvkar | Soviet Union | Sweden | Finland | (Soviet Union) (Russian Soviet Federative Socialist Republic) Komi ASSR |
| 1982; Details | Syktyvkar | Soviet Union | Sweden | Finland | Norway |
| 1984; Details | Kemerovo | Soviet Union | Sweden | Norway | Finland |
| 1986; Details | Irkutsk | Soviet Union | Sweden | Finland | (Soviet Union) (Russian Soviet Federative Socialist Republic) Russian SFSR |
| 1988; Details | Abakan | Soviet Union | Sweden | Finland | Norway |
| 1990; Details | Novosibirsk | Sweden | Finland | Soviet Union | Norway |
| 1992; Details | Krasnoyarsk | Russia | Sweden | (Commonwealth of Independent States) CIS | Finland |
| 1994; Details | Krasnoyarsk and Moscow | Sweden | Norway | Russia | Finland |
| 1996; Details | Arkhangelsk | Sweden | Russia | Russia-2 | Finland |
| 1998; Details | Nizhny Novgorod | Russia | Sweden | Finland | Norway |
| 2000; Details | Kazan | Russia | (Russia) Tatarstan | Sweden | Finland |
| 2002; Details | Arkhangelsk | Russia | Russia-2 | Finland | Sweden |
| 2003; Details | Krasnogorsk | Sweden | Russia-2 | Russia | Sweden U |
| 2006; Details | Krasnogorsk | Russia | Sweden | Baykal-Energiya Irkutsk | Norway |
| 2008; Details | Novosibirsk | Russia | Sweden | Russia-2 | Finland |
| 2010; Details | Kirov | Russia | Sweden | Russia-2 | (Russia) Ulyanovsk Oblast |
| 2012; Details | Abakan | Russia | Finland | Russia-2 | (Russia) Khakassia |
