= 1971 Bandy World Championship =

7th Bandy World Championship

Tournament details
- Host country: Sweden
- Dates: 3–14 March
- Teams: 4

Final positions
- Champions: Soviet Union (7th title)
- Runners-up: Sweden
- Third place: Finland
- Fourth place: Norway

Tournament statistics
- Games played: 12
- Goals scored: 68 (5.67 per game)

A promptional poster for the 1971 World Championship.

The 1971 Bandy World Championship was the seventh Bandy World Championship and was contested among four men's bandy playing nations. The championship was played in Sweden from 3 to 14 March 1971. The Soviet Union became champions.

== Qualified nations ==
- Soviet Union
- Finland
- Sweden
- Norway

== Tournament ==
All times are local (UTC+1).

Pos	Team	Pld	W	D	L	GF	GA	GD	Pts
1	Soviet Union	6	5	1	0	24	10	+14	11
2	Finland	6	2	0	4	21	18	+3	4
3	Sweden (H)	6	4	1	1	17	9	+8	9
4	Norway	6	0	0	6	6	31	−25	0

Source: 1971 WCS MEN – RESULTS
(H) Hosts
3 March 1971
-

Soviet Union	5-3	Finland
Georgy Kanareykin 49'; Aleksandr Izmodenov 50'; Valery Maslov 54'; Nikolai Durakov 59'; Anatoly Frolov 68'		Urho Partanen 50'; Juha Eklund 67'; Kalevi Pirkola 90'

Billingens Isbana, Skövde
Attendance: 1,328
Referee: (Sweden) R. Antonsson, (Sweden) O. Bennermo

3 March 1971
-

Sweden	4-2	Norway
Tore Skoglund 10', >45'; Håkan Olsson 48'		No Match Data

Vänersborgs Isstadion, Vänersborg
Attendance: 2,731
Referee: (Soviet Union) Osipov, (Soviet Union) Zhivlyuk, (Finland) Kantanen, (Finland) K. Ruutu

5 March 1971
-

Soviet Union	8-1	Norway
Nikolai Durakov 4'; Vladimir Monakhov <19'; Anatoly Frolov 19'; Valery Maslov 21', 40', 44'; Georgy Kanareykin <40'; Vladimir Tarasevich 89'		Steinar Pettersen 54'

Lidköpings Isstadion, Lidköping
Attendance: 266
Referee: (Finland) V. Kantanen, (Finland) K. Ruutu

5 March 1971
19:15

Sweden	3-2	Finland
No Match Data		No Match Data

Ruddalen Arena, Gothenburg
Attendance: 1,925
Referee: -

7 March 1971
-

Finland	6-1	Norway
No Match Data		No Match Data

Motala Isstadion, Motala
Attendance: 873
Referee: -

7 March 1971
-

Sweden	2-2	Soviet Union
Torbjörn Ek 45+2'; Sören Andersson 62'		Anatoly Frolov 49'; Nikolai Durakov 57'

Vinterstadion, Örebro
Attendance: 3,768
Referee: (Finland) V. Kantanen, (Finland) K. Ruutu

10 March 1971
19:15

Soviet Union	4-2	Finland
Nikolai Durakov 39', 61'; Valery Maslov 46'; Anatoly Frolov 66'		? Rouhiainen 19', 87'

Isstadion, Eskilstuna
Attendance: 2,274
Referee: (Sweden) R. Antonsson, (Sweden) O. Bennermo, (Norway) Jørgensen

10 March 1971
19:15

Sweden	3-0	Norway
No Match Data		No Match Data

Studenternas IP, Uppsala
Attendance: 2,839
Referee: (Soviet Union) Zhivlyuk, (Soviet Union) Osipov, (Finland) Kantanen, (Finland) K. Ruutu

12 March 1971
-

Soviet Union	3-1	Norway
Aleksandr Izmodenov 10'; Georgy Kanareykin 36'; Vladimir Monakhov 73'		Eskild Follvar 5'

Rocklunda, Västerås
Attendance: 813
Referee: (Finland) V. Kantanen, (Finland) K. Ruutu

12 March 1971
-

Sweden	4-1	Finland
No Game Data		No Game Data

Backavallen, Katrineholm
Attendance: 4,105
Referee: -

13 March 1971
-

Finland	7-1	Norway
No Game Data		No Game Data

Ramdalens IP, Oxelösund
Attendance: 926
Referee: -

14 March 1971
-

Sweden	1-2	Soviet Union
Torbjörn Ek 31'		Anatoly Frolov 44'; Yuri Lizavin 88'

Söderstadion, Stockholm
Attendance: 6,302
Referee: (Norway) V. Jørgensen, (Norway) K. Jansen

=== Final ranking ===
Rank	Team
1st place, gold medalist(s)	Soviet Union
2nd place, silver medalist(s)	Sweden
3rd place, bronze medalist(s)	Finland
4	Norway

=== Top Scorer ===
Scoring Leaders

- 6 Goals: (Finland) Kalevi Pirkola

=== Awards ===
Best players selected by the directorate:

- Best Goaltender: (Finland) Seppo Jolkkonen
- Best Defenceman: (Sweden) Matz-Allan Johansson
- Best Midfielder: (Sweden) Örjan Modin
- Best Forward: (Soviet Union) Nikolai Durakov
