= 1979 Bandy World Championship =

11th Bandy World Championship

Tournament details
- Host country: Sweden
- Dates: 27 January – 4 February
- Teams: 4

Final positions
- Champions: Soviet Union (11th title)
- Runners-up: Sweden
- Third place: Finland
- Fourth place: Norway

Tournament statistics
- Games played: 12
- Goals scored: 96 (8 per game)

The 1979 Bandy World Championship was contested among four men's bandy playing nations. The championship was played in Sweden from 27 January to 4 February 1979. Soviet Union, who remained unbeaten through the tournament, became champions.

== Qualified nations ==
- Soviet Union
- Finland
- Sweden
- Norway

== Tournament ==
All times are local (UTC+1).

Pos	Team	Pld	W	D	L	GF	GA	GD	Pts
1	Soviet Union	6	5	1	0	31	18	+13	11
2	Sweden (H)	6	4	0	2	31	11	+20	8
3	Finland	6	2	1	3	23	29	−6	5
4	Norway	6	0	0	6	11	38	−27	0

Source: 1979 WCS MEN – RESULTS
(H) Hosts
27 January 1979
-

Soviet Union	4-3	Sweden
Sergei Lomanov 16', 64'; Valery Bochkov 52'; Georgy Kanareykin 57'		Bengt Ramström 38'; Torbjörn Ek 82'; Håkan Olsson 89'

Isstadion, Vänersborg
Attendance: 4,487
Referee: (Norway) K. H. Olssen, (Norway) J. E. Olssen

27 January 1979
15:30

Finland	8-2	Norway
No Match Data		No Match Data

Slättbergsdammen, Trollhättan
Attendance: 339
Referee: (Soviet Union) Glebov, (Soviet Union) V. Kuznetsov

28 January 1979
-

Soviet Union	4-4	Finland
Georgy Kanareykin 7', 33'; Valery Eikhvald 32'; Sergei Lomanov 88'		Pekka Vartiainen 11'; Veikko Niemikorpi 30', 80'; Matti Alatalo 61'

Skarpe Nord, Kungälv
Attendance: 2,263
Referee: (Sweden) U. Karlsson, (Sweden) L. G. Enternes

28 January 1979
-

Sweden	7-1	Norway
No Match Data		No Match Data

Ruddalen, Gothenburg
Attendance: 2,291
Referee: (Finland) F. Östen, (Finland) T. Ruutu

30 January 1979
19:00

Soviet Union	6-4	Norway
Valery Bochkov 4'; Sergei Lomanov 18', 57'; Georgy Kanareykin 41', 42', 66'		Trond Amundsen 25'; Helge Moen 26', 58', 61'

Isstadion, Vänersborg
Attendance: 476
Referee: (Finland) T. Ruutu, (Finland) F. Östen

30 January 1979
19:00

Sweden	8-1	Finland
No Match Data		No Match Data

Slättbergsdammen, Trollhättan
Attendance: 5,068
Referee: -

1 February 1979
-

Soviet Union	6-3	Finland
Sergei Lomanov 37', 46', 53'; Vladimir Plavunov 52'; Valery Bochkov 72'; Valery Eikhvald 79'		Veikko Niemikorpi 33'; Leo Segerman 59'; Asko Eskola 66'

Studenternas, Uppsala
Attendance: 2,319
Referee: (Norway) K. H. Olssen, (Norway) J. E. Olssen

1 February 1979
-

Sweden	4-0	Norway
No Match Data		No Match Data

Kristinelunds sportfält, Köping
Attendance: 3,556
Referee: (Soviet Union) Glebov, (Soviet Union) V. Kuznetsov

2 February 1979
-

Soviet Union	7-2	Norway
Aleksandr Sivkov 27', 61', 64', 67'; Valery Bochkov 33'; Leonid Lobachev 49'; Sergei Lomanov 85'		Trond Amundsen 43'; Helge Moen 63'

Isstadion, Eskilstuna
Referee: (Sweden) U. Karlsson, (Sweden) L. G. Enternes

2 February 1979
-

Sweden	7-1	Finland
No Match Data		No Match Data

Backavallen, Katrineholm
Attendance: 4,232
Referee: -

4 February 1979
14:00

Finland	6-2	Norway
No Match Data		No Match Data

Spånga, Stockholm
Attendance: 282
Referee: -

4 February 1979
-

Soviet Union	4-2	Sweden
Sergei Lomanov 8', 37', 53'; Valery Eikhvald 55'		Bengt Ramström 5'; Ove Hemström 70'

Söderstadion, Stockholm
Attendance: 4,563
Referee: (Finland) T. Ruutu, (Finland) F. Östen

=== Final ranking ===
Rank	Team
1st place, gold medalist(s)	Soviet Union
2nd place, silver medalist(s)	Sweden
3rd place, bronze medalist(s)	Finland
4	Norway

=== Top Scorer ===
Scoring Leaders

- 13 Goals: (Soviet Union) Sergei Lomanov

=== Awards ===
Best players selected by the directorate:

- Best Goaltender: (Soviet Union) Sergei Lazarev
- Best Defenceman: (Soviet Union) Vladimir Plavunov
- Best Forward: (Soviet Union) Sergei Lomanov
