= 1983 Bandy World Championship =

13th Bandy World Championship

Tournament details
- Host country: Finland
- Dates: 15–20 February
- Teams: 4

Final positions
- Champions: Sweden (2nd title)
- Runners-up: Soviet Union
- Third place: Finland
- Fourth place: Norway

Tournament statistics
- Games played: 8
- Goals scored: 64 (8 per game)

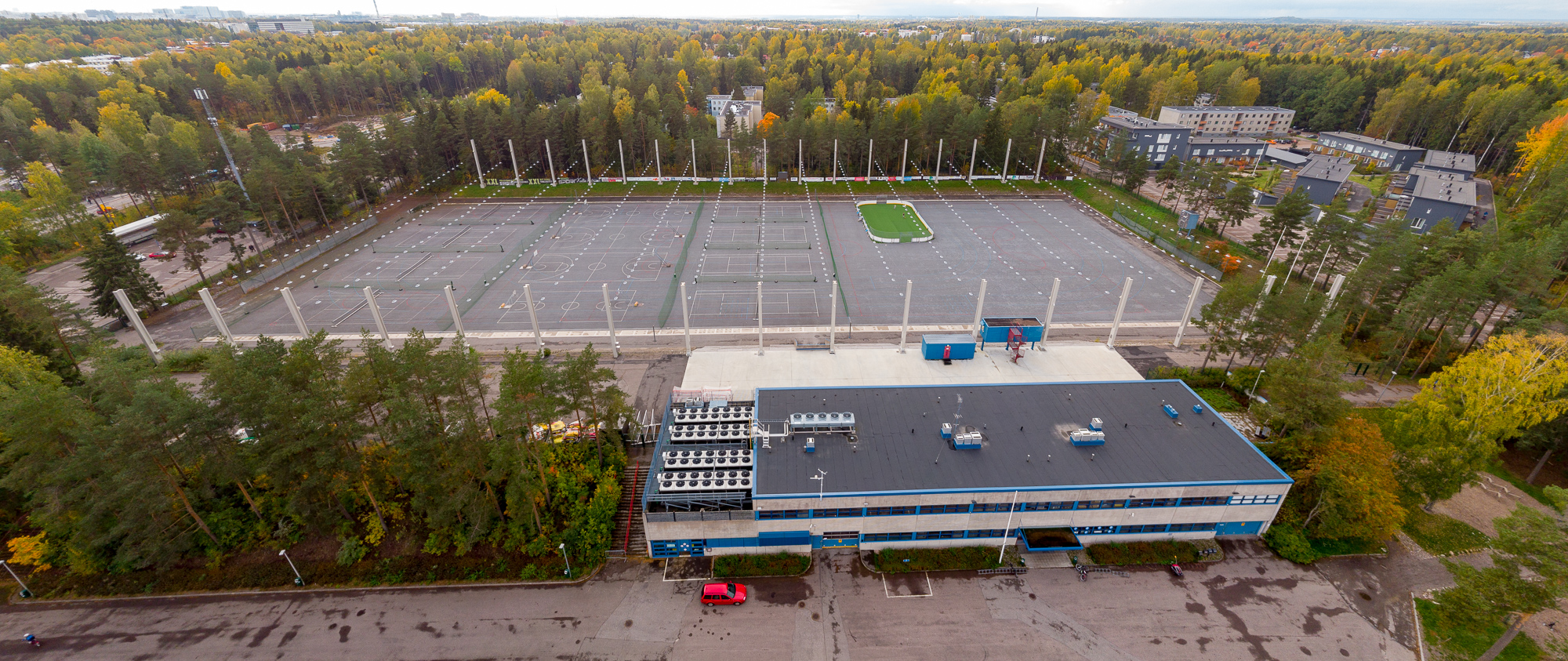
Oulunkylä Ice Rink in Helsinki

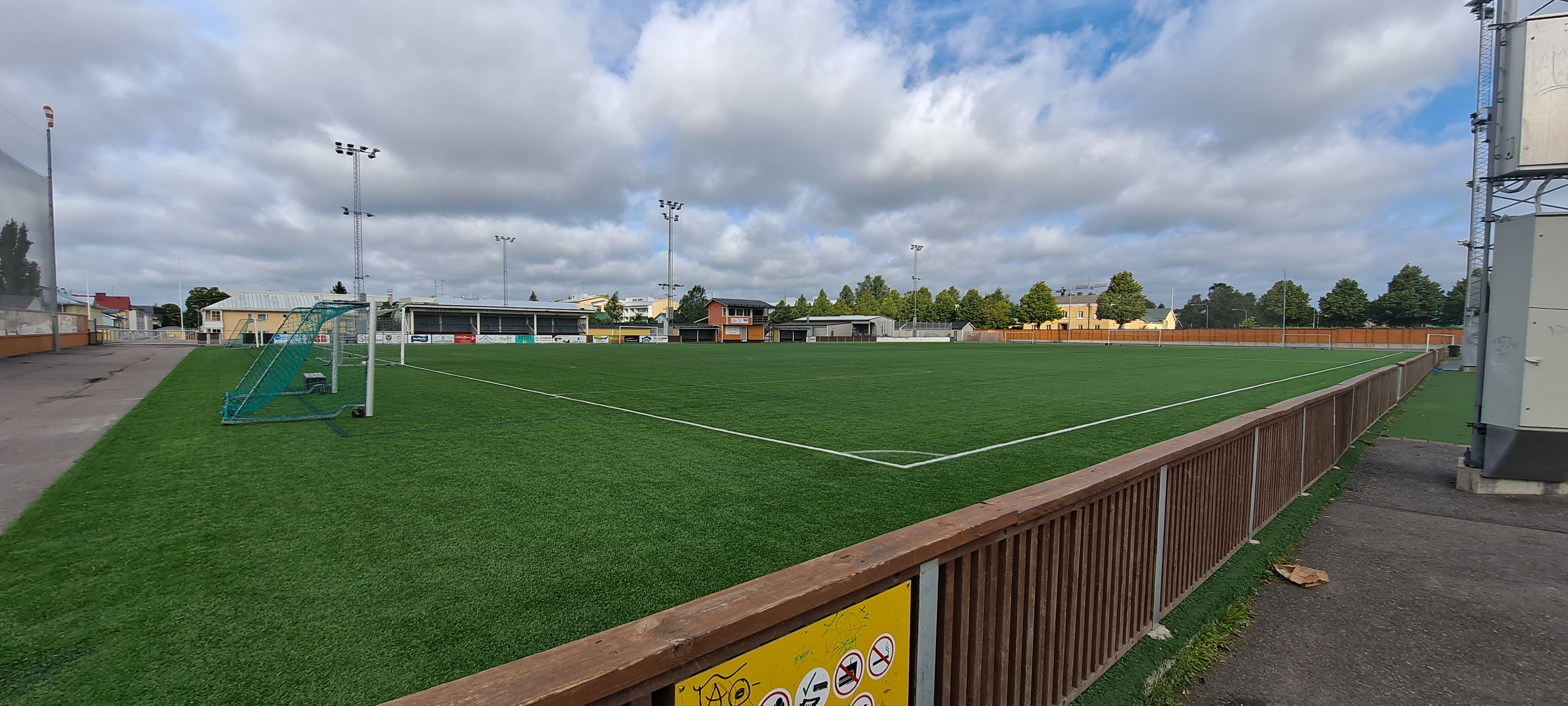
Porvoon pallokenttä in Porvoo

The 1983 Bandy World Championship was the 13th Bandy World Championship and was played in Finland from 15 to 20 February 1983. The Swedish national team became champions for the second time, defeating the Soviet Union in the final. Only four countries participated, but this was the last world championship played with so few contestants.

== Qualified nations ==
- Soviet Union
- Finland
- Sweden
- Norway

== Preliminary Round ==
All times are local (UTC+2).

Pos	Team	Pld	W	D	L	GF	GA	GD	Pts
1	Soviet Union	3	3	0	0	18	6	+12	6
2	Sweden	3	2	0	1	17	2	+15	4
3	Finland (H)	3	1	0	2	6	15	−9	2
4	Norway	3	0	0	3	6	24	−18	0

Source: 1983 WCS MEN – RESULTS
(H) Hosts
15 February 1983
-

Sweden	1-2	Soviet Union
Bengt Ramström 2'		Alexei Diakov 62'; Andrei Pashkin 67'

Porvoon Pallokenttä, Porvoo
Attendance: 1,487
Referee: (Finland) T. Ruutu, (Finland) A. Tyni

15 February 1983
-

Finland	6-1	Norway
No Match Data		No Match Data

Oulunkylä, Helsinki
Attendance: 616
Referee: (Sweden) L. Johansson, (Sweden) A. Funk, (Soviet Union) Glebov, (Soviet Union) V. Kuznetsov

16 February 1983
-

Soviet Union	10-5	Norway
Alexander Tsiganov 5', 6', 41', 43', 80'; Andrei Pashkin 23', 52', 81'; Asergei Lomanov 44'; Alexander Ryshakov 74'		Håkon Hauge 27', 85'; Helge Moen 50'; Tore Kristiansen 59'; Arne Wam 77'

Porvoon Pallokenttä, Porvoo
Attendance: 157
Referee: (Sweden) L. Johansson, (Sweden) A. Funk, (Finland) T. Ruutu, (Finland) Tyni

16 February 1983
-

Finland	0-8	Sweden
No Match Data		No Match Data

Oulunkylä, Helsinki
Attendance: 1,1016
Referee: (Soviet Union) Glebov, (Soviet Union) V. Kuznetsov, (Norway) F. Johansen, (Norway) F. Jakobsen

18 February 1983
-

Finland	0-6	Soviet Union
		Sergei Lamanov 6'; Andrei Pashkin 21', 71'; Anatoly Popov 24'; Vladimir Plavunov 26'; Vitali Savluk 32'

Porvoon Pallokenttä, Porvoo
Attendance: 761
Referee: (Norway) F. Johansen, (Norway) F. Jakobsen

18 February 1983
-

Sweden	8-0	Norway
No Match Data		No Match Data

Oulunkylä, Helsinki
Attendance: 240
Referee: (Finland) T. Ruutu, (Finland) A. Tyni, (Soviet Union) Glebov, (Soviet Union) V. Kuznetsov

=== Final round ===
==== 3rd Place ====
19 February 1983
-

Finland	4-1	Norway
No Match Data		No Match Data

Porvoon Pallokenttä, Porvoo
Attendance: 1,150
Referee: (Soviet Union) Glebov, (Soviet Union) V. Kuznetsov, (Sweden) L. Johansson, (Sweden) A. Funk

==== Finals ====
20 February 1983
-

Soviet Union	3-9	Sweden
Vladimir Plavunov 15', 75'; Vitaly Anufriyenko 37'		Sören Boström 3', 28'; Ola Johansson 9', 43'; Christer Kjellqvist 33'; Mikael Arvidsson 36', 64'; Hans Johansson 79'; Mats Carlsson 85'

Oulunkylä, Helsinki
Attendance: 1,315
Referee: (Norway) F. Johansen, (Norway) F. Jakobsen

=== Final ranking ===
Rank	Team
1st place, gold medalist(s)	Sweden
2nd place, silver medalist(s)	Soviet Union
3rd place, bronze medalist(s)	Finland
4	Norway

=== Top Scorer ===
Scoring Leaders

- 6 Goals: (Soviet Union) Andrey Pashkin

=== Awards ===
Best players selected by the directorate:

- Best Goaltender: (Sweden) Anders Bridholm
- Best Defenceman: (Sweden) Mats Carlsson
- Best Midfielder: (Soviet Union) Vladimir Plavunov
- Best Forward: (Sweden) Ola Johansson
