= 1961 Bandy World Championship =

2nd Bandy World Championship

Tournament details
- Host country: Norway
- Venues: 6 (in 5 host cities)
- Dates: 22 – 26 February
- Teams: 4

Final positions
- Champions: Soviet Union
- Runners-up: Sweden
- Third place: Finland
- Fourth place: Norway

Tournament statistics
- Games played: 6
- Goals scored: 33 (5.5 per game)

The 1961 Bandy World Championship was the second Bandy World Championship, after the first having been arranged four years earlier. The world championships were subsequently played every other year, so the next tournament was held in 1963. Norway hosted the competition as part of the 100th anniversary of the Norwegian Confederation of Sports. The 1961 tournament was contested by four men's bandy playing nations. The championship was played in Norway from 22 to 26 February 1961. The Soviet Union became champions.

Norway, having boycotted the first championship in 1957, made its championship début on home turf but lost all its games and came in last of the four participating nations.

== Qualified nations ==
- Soviet Union
- Finland
- Sweden
- Norway

== Tournament ==
All times are local (UTC+1). Detailed match data can not be found. Some Scorers are disputed

Pos	Team	Pld	W	D	L	GF	GA	GD	Pts
1	Soviet Union	3	3	0	0	14	4	+10	6
2	Sweden	3	2	0	1	7	4	+3	4
3	Finland	3	1	0	2	7	10	−3	2
4	Norway (H)	3	0	0	3	5	15	−10	0

Source: 1961 WCS MEN – RESULTS
(H) Hosts
22 February 1961
19:00

Soviet Union	3-2	Finland
Valery Maslov 47', 84'; Yuri Varzin 77'		Tauno Timoska 83'; Kauko Korpela 89'

Stabekkbanen, Bærum
Attendance: ~1,500
Referee: (Sweden) B. Andrén, (Sweden) A. Sjöberg

22 February 1961
19:00

Norway	1-2	Sweden
Ole Martinsen <10'		Ove Eidhagen 13'; Roland Niva 39'

Herøya, Porsgrunn
Attendance: ~2,500
Referee: (Finland) I. Mattila, (Finland) O. Pättiniemi

24 February 1961
19:00

Norway	1-9	Soviet Union
Bernt Skarnæs 75'		Mikhail Osintev 11', 83'; Yevgeny Papugin 24'; Aleksandr Izmodenov 28'; Anatoly Panin 33'; Yuri Varzin 55'; Mikhail Osintsev 61'; Valery Maslov 71'; Valentin Khardin 85'

Nedre Eiker, Mjøndalen
Attendance: ~4,500
Referee: (Finland) I. Mattila, (Finland) O. Pättiniemi

24 February 1961
19:00

Sweden	4-1	Finland
No match data		No match data

Gressbanen, Oslo
Attendance: ~1,500
Referee: (Soviet Union) Khlopotin, (Soviet Union) B. Solovyov

26 February 1961
13:15

Norway	3-4	Finland
Ulf Hagen 5'; Ole Martinsen <45', 69'		Tauno Timoska <45'; Kauko Korpela <90', <90'; Matti Kovalainen <90'

Marienlyst, Drammen
Attendance: ~600
Referee: (Soviet Union) Khlopotin, (Soviet Union) B. Solovyov

26 February 1961
-

Sweden	1-2	Soviet Union
Jens Lindblom 33'		Valentin Atamanychev 3', 71'

Bislett, Oslo
Attendance: ~2,000
Referee: (Norway) L. Paulsen, (Norway) J. Østlie

=== Final ranking ===
Rank	Team
1st place, gold medalist(s)	Soviet Union
2nd place, silver medalist(s)	Sweden
3rd place, bronze medalist(s)	Finland
4	Norway

=== Top Scorer ===
Scoring Leaders

- 3 Goals: (Soviet Union) Valery Maslov
- 3 Goals: (Soviet Union) Valentin Atamanychev
- 3 Goals: (Finland) Tauno Timoska
- 3 Goals: (Norway) Ole Martinsen

=== Awards ===
Best players selected by the directorate:

- Best Goaltender: (Soviet Union) Anatoly Malnikov
- Best Defenceman: (Sweden) Ulf Fredin
- Best Midfielder: (Norway) Bernt Skarnes
- Best Forward: (Soviet Union) Valentin Atamanychev
