= Bandy at the 1952 Winter Olympics =

Tournament details
- Host country: Norway
- Venues: 2 (in 1 host city)
- Dates: 20–23 February 1952
- Teams: 3

Final positions
- Champions: Sweden (1st title)
- Runners-up: Norway
- Third place: Finland

Tournament statistics
- Games played: 3
- Goals scored: 12 (4 per game)

Bandy was held as a demonstration sport at the 1952 Winter Olympics in Oslo. A men's program was included but not a women's program.

Sweden, Norway and Finland participated with their best players and won one match each. All three teams also lost a match apiece. Sweden won the tournament thanks to the best goal difference, with Norway second and Finland third. The three participating countries regularly played friendlies, but this was the first official international bandy tournament since 1913.

Though bandy was played in the Soviet Union, it did not partake in the event because the country did not compete in any international bandy competitions at that point. While agreements had previously been made to play friendlies against Sweden in the late 1940s, the plans did not come to fruition.

The Olympic bandy games were noticed by the sport's leaders from the Soviet Union, who invited the three Nordic countries to a friendly four-nation bandy tournament in 1954. The first men's Bandy World Championships were not held until five years later, in 1957.

== Medalists ==
Gold:
Sweden

- Yngve Palmqvist
- Orvar Bergmark
- Herbert Swartswee
- Karl-Erik Sjöberg
- Olle Lindgren
- Sven-Olof Landar
- Inge Cahlman
- Martin Johansson
- Olle Sääv
- Sven-Eric Broberg
- Ernst Hård
- Agard Magnusson
- Tore Olsson
- Henry Olsson
Silver:
Norway

- Bosse Halla
- Leif Eriksen
- David Eriksen
- Arne Bakker
- Tore Frisholm
- Rolf Person
- Arne Johansen
- Einar Andersen
- Martin Olsen
- Cato Helgerud
- Gunnar Fossum
- Ole Marthinsen
Bronze:
Finland

- Herbert Lundström
- Juhani Halme
- Yrjö Jussila
- Arvo Raitavuo
- Per-Erik Lindqvist
- Martti Nyyssönen
- Olof Stolpe
- Kauko Tukiainen
- Erik Åberg
- Heikki Ollikainen
- Sakari Salo
- Pentti Immonen
- Pentti Hämäläinen

== Results ==
1952 Winter Olympics (Men's bandy)
Pos	Team	Pld	W	D	L	GF	GA	GD	Pts
1	Sweden	2	1	0	1	5	2	+3	2
2	Norway	2	1	0	1	4	4	0	2
3	Finland	2	1	0	1	3	6	−3	2

20 February 1952
14:00

Finland	3–2	Norway

Dælenenga idrettspark, Oslo
Referee: O. Gyhlén (Sweden)

21 February 1952
14:00

Norway	2–1	Sweden

Dælenenga idrettspark, Oslo
Referee: Johan Alho (Finland)

23 February 1952
14:00

Sweden	4–0	Finland

Bislett Stadium, Oslo
Referee: Thv. Lindstad (Norway)

== Final rankings ==
1st place, gold medalist(s)	Sweden
2nd place, silver medalist(s)	Norway
3rd place, bronze medalist(s)	Finland
