= 1969 Bandy World Championship =

1969 edition of the Bandy World Championship

6th Bandy World Championship

Tournament details
- Host country: Sweden
- Dates: 8–16 February
- Teams: 3

Final positions
- Champions: Soviet Union (6th title)
- Runners-up: Sweden
- Third place: Finland

Tournament statistics
- Games played: 6
- Goals scored: 40 (6.67 per game)

The 1969 Bandy World Championship was the sixth Bandy World Championship and was contested by three men's bandy playing nations. The championship was played in Sweden from 8 to 16 February 1969.

Originally the tournament was to be arranged in Norway, but the Norwegians declined to participate and arrange the championship so Sweden had to take over. Norway did not want to be part of a tournament where the Soviet Union played, due to the Soviet and its allies invasion of Czechoslovakia the previous year.

The Soviet Union won all four of its matches and became champions.

== Qualified nations ==
- Soviet Union
- Finland
- Sweden

== Tournament ==
All times are local (UTC+1).

Pos	Team	Pld	W	D	L	GF	GA	GD	Pts
1	Soviet Union	4	4	0	0	21	6	+15	8
2	Sweden (H)	4	1	0	3	9	13	−4	2
3	Finland	4	1	0	3	10	21	−11	2

Source: 1969 WCS MEN – RESULTS
(H) Hosts
8 February 1969
13:00

Sweden	5-1	Finland
- <45', <45', <45', <45', >45'		- >45'

Vänersborgs Isstadion, Vänersborg
Attendance: 4,969
Referee: (Soviet Union) Yuri Bocharov, (Soviet Union) Zhivlyuk

9 February 1969
13:00

Soviet Union	10-1	Finland
Mikhail Osintsev 5'; Nikolai Durakov 9', 44', 49'; Aleksandr Izmodenov 26', 55'; Anatoly Rushkin 39', 66'; Anatoly Frolov 52'; Yevgeny Gerasimov 89'		Kalevi Pirkola 17'

Lidköpings Isstadion, Lidköping
Attendance: 4,157
Referee: (Sweden) B. Nilsson, (Sweden) K. Nyström

11 February 1969
19:00

Sweden	2-4	Soviet Union
Bernt Eriksson 48'; Göran Sedvall 80'		Aleksandr Izmodenov 10'; Antoly Frolov 35', 37'; Yuri Lizavin 56'

Winterstadion, Örebro
Attendance: 7,223
Referee: (Finland) M. Hirviniemi, (Finland) K. Ruutu

13 February 1969
-

Sweden	1-6	Finland
- <90'		- <90', <90', <90', <90', <90', <90'

Skogsvallen, Nässjö
Attendance: 1,980
Referee: (Soviet Union) Yuri Bocharov, (Soviet Union) Zhivlyuk

15 February 1969
14:00

Soviet Union	5-2	Finland
Anatoly Frolov 1', 32'; Aleksandr Izmodenov 4'; Anatoly Rushkin 15'; Yuri Lizavin 88'		Esko Holopainen 3'; Kalevi Pirkola 90'

Backavallen, Katrineholm
Attendance: 1,135
Referee: (Sweden) B. Nilsson, (Sweden) K. Nyström

16 February 1969
-

Soviet Union	2-1	Sweden
Yuri Lizavin 45'; Nikolai Durakov 64'		Göran Sedvall 6'

Studenternas, Uppsala
Attendance: 1,468
Referee: (Finland) K. Ruutu, (Finland) M. Hirviniemi

=== Final ranking ===
Rank	Team
1st place, gold medalist(s)	Soviet Union
2nd place, silver medalist(s)	Sweden
3rd place, bronze medalist(s)	Finland

=== Top Scorer ===
Scoring Leaders

- 5 Goals: (Soviet Union) Anatoly Frolov

=== Awards ===
Best players selected by the directorate:

- Best Goaltender: (Finland) Lars Näsman
- Best Defenceman: (Sweden) Matz-Allan Johansson
- Best Midfielder: (Soviet Union) Yuri Shorin
- Best Forward: (Soviet Union) Anatoly Frolov
