= Finland national bandy team =

Finland
- Association: Finland's Bandy Association (Suomen Jääpalloliitto) (Finlands Bandyförbund)
- Head coach: (Finland) Ari Holopainen
- Team colors
Home colours	Away colours

First international
- Finland 1 – 12 Sweden; Helsinki, Grand Duchy of Finland, Russian Empire 11 March 1907

Biggest win
- Finland 23–0 Belarus (Haparanda, Sweden; 25 March 2001)

Biggest defeat
- Sweden 15–2 Finland (Trollhättan, Sweden; 22 November 1998)

Olympics
- Appearances: 1 (first in 1952)
- Medals: Bronze: (1952)

Bandy World Championship
- Appearances: 42 (first in 1957)
- Best result: Gold: (2004)

Medal record

World Championship
Gold medal – first place	2004 Sweden	
Silver medal – second place	1957 Finland	
Silver medal – second place	1963 Sweden	
Silver medal – second place	1987 Sweden	
Silver medal – second place	1989 Soviet Union	
Silver medal – second place	1999 Russia	
Silver medal – second place	2011 Russia	
Silver medal – second place	2016 Russia	
Silver medal – second place	2023 Sweden	
Silver medal – second place	2025 Sweden	
Silver medal – second place	2026 Finland	
Bronze medal – third place	1961 Norway	
Bronze medal – third place	1969 Sweden	
Bronze medal – third place	1971 Sweden	
Bronze medal – third place	1973 Soviet Union	
Bronze medal – third place	1975 Finland	
Bronze medal – third place	1977 Norway	
Bronze medal – third place	1979 Sweden	
Bronze medal – third place	1981 Soviet Union	
Bronze medal – third place	1983 Finland	
Bronze medal – third place	1985 Norway	
Bronze medal – third place	1991 Finland	
Bronze medal – third place	1995 United States	
Bronze medal – third place	1997 Sweden	
Bronze medal – third place	2001 Finland	
Bronze medal – third place	2006 Sweden	
Bronze medal – third place	2007 Russia	
Bronze medal – third place	2008 Russia	
Bronze medal – third place	2009 Sweden	
Bronze medal – third place	2010 Russia	
Bronze medal – third place	2017 Sweden	
Bronze medal – third place	2018 Russia	
Bronze medal – third place	2019 Sweden	

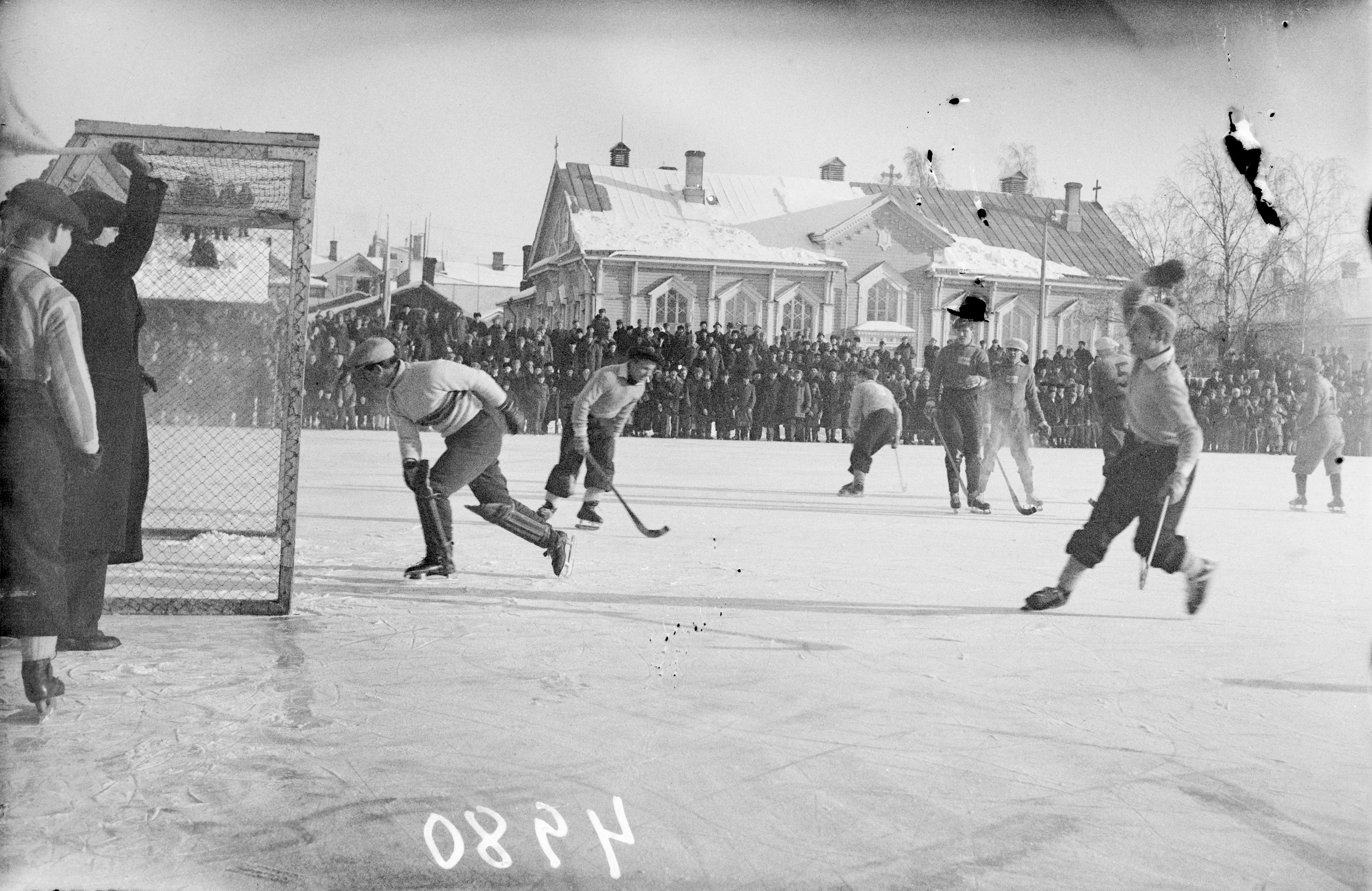
Bandy match between Finland and Sweden in Oulu 1947

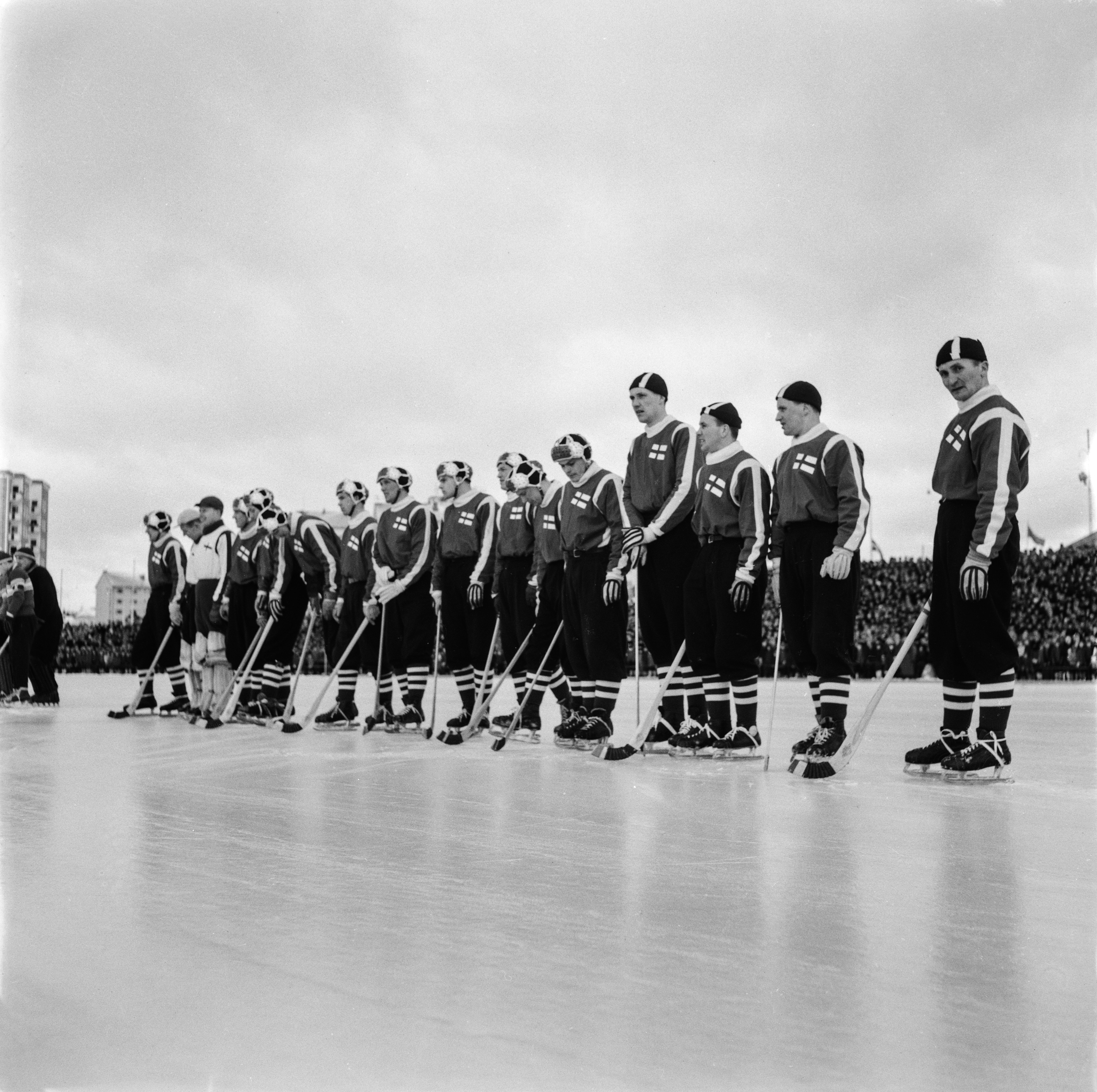
Finland national bandy team in 1959

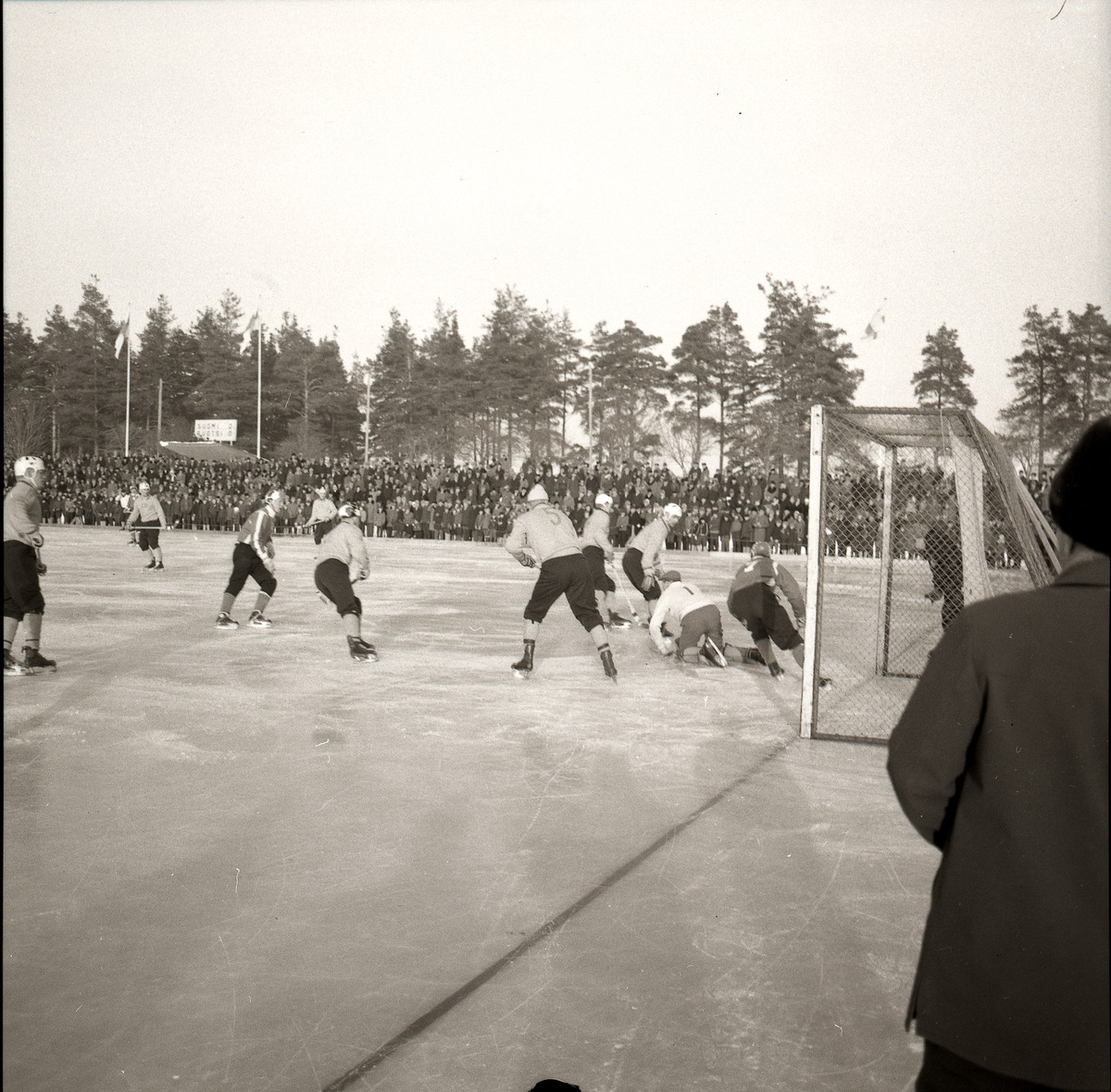
Finland and Sweden Bandy match in Kimpinen Sports Centre 1962

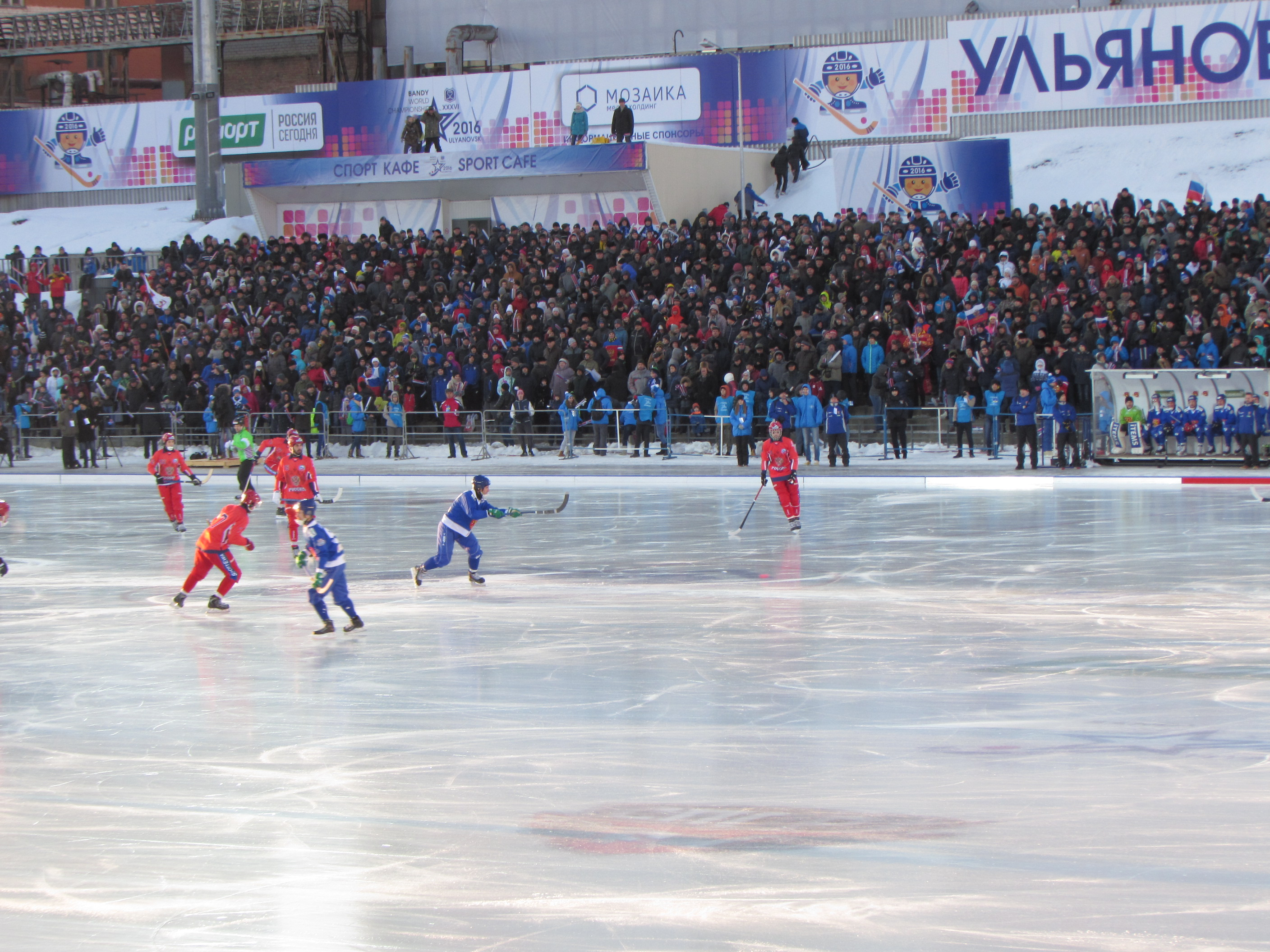
Finland in the final of the 2016 World Championship

The Finnish national bandy team (Finnish: Suomen jääpallomaajoukkue, Swedish: Finlands herrlandslag i bandy) has taken part in all the Bandy World Championships for men since the competition was first launched in 1957. Finland won the championship title in 2004. They have always finished in the top four, and have won 28 medals in 36 championships.

The team is controlled by Finland's Bandy Association.

== History ==
Finland was represented by the club Polyteknikkojen Urheiluseura (PUS) in the winter games in Helsinki in 1907, but the team was beaten by a team from Sweden.

The first international bandy game after Finland became independent was held during the 1919 Finnish Winter Games in Helsinki, which were the first international sporting event organized by the recently independent nation. The national team's roster was dominated by players from Viipurin Sudet and included only three players representing other domestic clubs, Harald Nyström from HIFK, Lars Schybergson from Kiffen, and Niilo Tammisalo from HJK. The national team's match against the Swedish club IFK Uppsala was held on 23 February at Töölön Pallokenttä before a crowd of 5,000 spectators, including the State Regent of Finland, C.G.E. Mannerheim. The Finns won the match 4–1 in a victory that was described in the press as “one of the most amazing achievements of Finnish athletes.”

In the 1920s and 1930s, Finland regularly played friendly games against Sweden and against Estonia.

Finland, Norway, and Sweden played bandy at the 1952 Winter Olympics in Oslo. After having seen them there, the Soviet Union invited these three countries to a four nation bandy tournament in 1954. This was the first time a Soviet national bandy team met other national bandy teams. The four countries used somewhat different rules prior to this tournament, but the rules were adjusted to be the same for the future.

The first ever World Championships of bandy were organised in 1957 in association with the 50th anniversary of the Ball Association of Finland, which at the time was the governing body of bandy in Finland. It was played at the Helsinki Olympic Stadium.

Finland's Bandy Association was founded in 1972.

== Tournament records ==
=== Olympics ===
Games	Finish
Norway 1952, Oslo	Bronze

=== Nordic Games ===
Games	Finish
Sweden 1922, Stockholm	Gold

=== Unofficial tournament ===
Games	Finish
Soviet Union 1954, Moscow	Bronze
Finland 2020, Porvoo / Lappeenranta	Gold
Sweden 2024, Karlstad	Silver

=== World Championship record ===
Games	Finish
Finland 1957, Helsinki	Silver
Norway 1961, N/A	Bronze
Sweden 1963, N/A	Silver
Soviet Union 1965, N/A	4th place
Finland 1967, N/A	Silver
Sweden 1969, N/A	Bronze
Sweden 1971, N/A	Bronze
Soviet Union 1973, Moscow / N/A	Bronze
Finland 1975, N/A	Bronze
Norway 1977, N/A	Bronze
Sweden 1979, N/A	Bronze
Soviet Union 1981, Habarovsk	Bronze
Finland 1983, Helsinki / Porvoo	Bronze
Norway 1985, Oslo / N/A	Bronze
Sweden 1987, Stockholm / N/A	Silver
Soviet Union 1989, Moscow	Silver
Finland 1991, Helsinki / Porvoo	Bronze
Norway 1993, Hamar	4th place
United States 1995, Roseville, Minnesota	Bronze
Sweden 1997, Västerås / N/A	Bronze
Russia 1999, Arkhangelsk	Silver
Finland and Sweden 2001, Oulu / Haparanda	Bronze
Russia 2003, Arkhangelsk	4th place
Sweden and Hungary 2004, Västerås / Budapest	Gold
Russia 2005, Kazan	4th place
Sweden 2006, Stockholm / N/A	Bronze
Russia 2007, Kemerovo	Bronze
Russia 2008, Moscow	Bronze
Sweden 2009, Västerås / N/A	Bronze
Russia 2010, Moscow	Bronze
Russia 2011, Kazan	Silver
Kazakhstan 2012, Almaty	4th place
Sweden and Norway 2013, Vänersborg / N/A	4th place
Russia 2014, Irkutsk / Shelekhov	4th place
Russia 2015, Khabarovsk	4th place
Russia 2016, Ulyanovsk	Silver
Sweden 2017, Sandviken	Bronze
Russia and China 2018, Khabarovsk / Harbin	Bronze
Sweden 2019, Vänersborg	Bronze
Russia 2020, Irkutsk	COVID-19 pandemic.
Russia 2022, Syktyvkar	Russian invasion of Ukraine
Sweden 2023, Växjö	Silver
Sweden 2025, Lidköping	Silver
Finland 2026, Pori	Silver

=== Russian Government Cup ===
Games	Finish
(Soviet Union) Rossiya Tournament 1972, Ulyanovsk	Bronze
(Soviet Union) Rossiya Tournament 1974, Arkhangelsk	Bronze
(Soviet Union) Rossiya Tournament 1976, Khabarovsk	Bronze
(Soviet Union) Rossiya Tournament 1978, Kemerovo	Silver
(Soviet Union) Rossiya Tournament 1980, Syktyvkar	Bronze
(Soviet Union) Rossiya Tournament 1982, Syktyvkar	Bronze
(Soviet Union) Rossiya Tournament 1984, Kemerovo	4th place
(Soviet Union) Rossiya Tournament 1986, Irkutsk	Bronze
(Soviet Union) Rossiya Tournament 1988, Abakan	Bronze
(Soviet Union) Rossiya Tournament 1990, Novosibirsk	Silver
(Russia) Russian Government Cup 1992, Krasnojarsk	4th place
(Russia) Russian Government Cup 1994, Novosibirsk	4th place
(Russia) Russian Government Cup 1996, Arkhangelsk \ Moscow	4th place
(Russia) Russian Government Cup 1998, Nizhny Novgorod	Bronze
(Russia) Russian Government Cup 2000, Kazan	4th place
(Russia) Russian Government Cup 2002, Arkhangelsk	Bronze
(Russia) Russian Government Cup 2003, Krasnogorsk	5th place
(Russia) Russian Government Cup 2006, Krasnogorsk	5th place
(Russia) Russian Government Cup 2008, Novosibirsk	4th place
(Russia) Russian Government Cup 2010, Kirov	5th place
(Russia) Russian Government Cup 2012, Abakan	Silver

== Youth World Championship ==
Champions
Y15 Class
1996, 2004
Y17 Class
1979, 2013, 2024

== Current squad ==
Finnish squad at the 2014 World Championship in Irkutsk, Russia, January 26 – February 2, 2014.

Pos.	Age	Name	Club
GK	37	Timo Oksanen	(Sweden) Bollnäs GIF
GK	30	Kimmo Kyllönen	(Sweden) IK Sirius
DF	28	Ilari Moisala	(Sweden) Brobergs IF
DF	35	Pekka Hiltunen	(Sweden) HT-Bandy
DF	31	Antti Ekman	(Sweden) HT-Bandy
MF	22	Samuli Helavuori	(Sweden) Bollnäs GIF
MF	39	Kimmo Huotelin	(Finland) Kampparit
MF	28	Ville-Veikko Angeria	(Finland) Akilles
MF	34	Ville Aaltonen	(Sweden) Bollnäs GIF
MF	29	Juho Liukkonen	(Sweden) Bollnäs GIF
MF	27	Tomi Hauska	(Sweden) Vetlanda BK
MF	26	Anssi Hänninen	(Finland) JPS Jyväskylä
MF	26	Samuli Koivuniemi	(Finland) OLS Oulu
FW	31	Mikko Rytkönen	(Finland) JPS Jyväskylä
FW	31	Tomi Tukiainen	(Finland) Akilles
FW	27	Mikko Lukkarila	(Sweden) IFK Kungälv
FW	26	Markus Kumpuoja	(Sweden) Hammarby IF
FW	39	Sami Laakkonen	(Russia) Dynamo Kazan
