= 2010–11 Elitserien (bandy) =

2010–11 Elitserien season
- League: (Sweden) Elitserien
- Sport: Bandy
- Duration: 27 October 2010 – 21 March 2011
- Number of teams: 14

Regular season
- League Champions: Sandvikens AIK
- Runners-up: Bollnäs GIF
- Top scorer: Christoffer Edlund
- Promoted to Allsvenskan: GAIS, Kalix BF
- Relegated to Allsvenskan: Haparanda-Tornio PV, IF Boltic

Playoffs
- Finals champions: Sandvikens AIK
- Runners-up: Bollnäs GIF

Elitserien seasons
- ← 2009–2010 2011–2012 →

== League table ==
The regular season started 27 October 2010 and ended 19 February 2011.

Standings as of 22 February 2011

Pos	Team	Pld	W	D	L	GF	GA	Pts	GD
1	Sandvikens AIK	26	20	2	4	199	100	42	+99
2	Bollnäs GIF	26	17	2	7	138	94	36	+44
3	Edsbyns IF	26	16	2	8	140	102	34	+38
4	Villa Lidköping BK	26	16	1	9	158	121	33	+37
5	Hammarby IF	26	13	5	8	141	107	31	+34
6	Broberg/Söderhamn Bandy	26	14	2	10	131	114	30	+17
7	IK Sirius	26	12	4	10	109	104	28	+5
8	Västerås SK	26	11	5	10	113	102	27	+11
9	Vetlanda BK	26	9	7	10	123	133	25	-10
10	IFK Kungälv	26	11	2	13	90	99	24	-9
11	Tillberga IK	26	6	7	13	123	134	19	-11
12	IFK Vänersborg	26	6	4	16	90	122	16	-32
13	Haparanda-Tornio PV	26	6	3	17	85	155	15	-70
14	IF Boltic	26	1	2	23	74	227	4	-153

Teams 1–8 qualifies to the playoffs, teams 9–10 qualifies to next season's Elitserien, teams 11–12 plays the second placed teams of each Allsvenskan to qualify to next season and teams 13–14 are relegated to Allsvenskan

=== Knock-out stage ===
The quarter and semi finals started 22 February and ended 10 March. The final was played 20 March 2011.

Quarter finals
1	Sandvikens AIK	3 wins
8	Västerås SK	0 wins
3	Edsbyns IF	2 wins
5	Hammarby IF	3 wins
2	Bollnäs GIF	3 wins
7	IK Sirius	1 win
4	Villa Lidköping BK	3 wins
6	Broberg/Söderhamn Bandy	2 wins

Semi finals
1	Sandvikens AIK	3 wins
5	Hammarby IF	0 wins
2	Bollnäs GIF	3 wins
4	Villa Lidköping BK	0 wins

Final
1	Sandvikens AIK	6
2	Bollnäs GIF	5

==== Final ====
20 March 2011
15:00 UTC+1

Sandvikens AIK	6–5 (a.e.t.)	Bollnäs GIF
Svechnikov (13); Aarni (25); Berlin (52); Edlund (61, pen., 65); Eriksson (93)	Report	Spinnars (21, cor.); Hellmyrs (38, 45+1, cor.); Forslund (49, 57)

Studenternas IP
Attendance: 19,117
Referee: Hakan Sjosten

=== Relegation play-offs ===
Qualification to the 2011–2012 season was played between 1 and 5 March 2011.

== Season statistics ==
=== Top scorers ===
As of end of season.

Rank	Player	Club	Goals
1	(Sweden) Christoffer Edlund	Sandvikens AIK	77
2	(Sweden) Patrik Nilsson	Hammarby IF	56
3	(Sweden) David Karlsson	Villa Lidköping BK	51
4	(Sweden) Joakim Hedqvist	Broberg/Söderhamn Bandy	47
5	(Sweden) Christian Mickelsson	IK Sirius	46
6	(Sweden) Tomas Knutson	Vetlanda BK	34
7	(Finland) Mikko Lukkarila	Bollnäs GIF	33
8	(Sweden) Daniel Andersson	Villa Lidköping BK	31
8	(Sweden) Jonas Nilsson	Västerås SK	31
10	(Sweden) Jesper Bryngelson	Villa Lidköping BK	30
