= Rossiya Tournament 1972 =

Rossiya Tournament 1972 was a bandy competition played in Ulyanovsk on 15–18 January 1972. It was the first time the Rossiya Tournament was arranged. The Soviet Union won the tournament.

The tournament was decided by round-robin results like a group stage.

== Results ==
Team	Pld	W	D	L	GF	GA	GD	Pts
Soviet Union	3	3	0	0	11	8	+3	6
Sweden	3	2	0	1	9	8	+1	4
Finland	3	1	0	2	4	7	−3	2
Norway	3	0	0	3	3	9	−6	0

== Sources ==
- Norges herrlandskamper i bandy (Norway)
- Sverige-Sovjet i bandy (Sweden)
- Rossija Tournament (Russia)
