= Olof Stolpe =

Finnish footballer and bandy player (1927-2006)

Personal information
- Full name: Olof Ossian Hugo Stolpe
- Born: 18 April 1927 Vaasa, Finland
- Died: 7 February 2006 (aged 78) Vaasa, Finland
Medal record
Men's bandy
Representing Finland
Olympic Games (demonstration sport)
Bronze medal – third place	1952 Oslo	Team

Olof Stolpe
Personal information
- Full name: Olof Ossian Hugo Stolpe
- Date of birth: 18 April 1927
- Place of birth: Vaasa, Finland
- Date of death: 7 February 2006 (aged 78)
- Place of death: Vaasa, Finland
- Position: Inside forward

Senior career*
Years	Team	Apps	(Gls)
1946–1956	Vasa IFK	177	(63)
1957	Jakobstads BK		(4)
1958	Vaasan Pallo-Veikot		
1959	Vaasan Palloseura		(10)
1960-1963	Vasa IFK	29	(3)

International career
1947–1953	Finland	12	(2)
1952	Finland Olympic	1	(2)
- * Club domestic league appearances and goals

Olof Ossian Hugo Stolpe (18 April 1927 – 7 February 2006) was a Finnish footballer and bandy player. He competed for the Finnish football team at the 1952 Summer Olympics and for the Finnish bandy team at the 1952 Winter Olympics, where Finland won the bronze medals in the demonstration competition for bandy.

Most of his football career, he played for Vasa IFK. He won the Finnish Championship with VIFK in 1953.
