= Rossiya Tournament 1974 =

Rossiya Tournament 1974 was a bandy competition played in Arkhangelsk on 25–27 January 1974. It was the second time the Rossiya Tournament was arranged. Sweden won the tournament.

The tournament was decided by round-robin results like a group stage.

== Results ==
Team	Pld	W	D	L	GF	GA	GD	Pts	SWE	URS	FIN	NOR
Sweden	3	3	0	0	11	5	+6	6		–	–	3–1
Soviet Union	3	1	0	2	8	7	+1	2	1–4		2–3	5–0
Finland	3	1	0	2	9	10	−1	2	3–4	–		–
Norway	3	1	0	2	5	11	−6	2	–	–	4–3	

== Sources ==
- Norges herrlandskamper i bandy
