= Rossiya Tournament 1976 =

Rossiya Tournament 1976 was a bandy competition played in Khabarovsk on 22–25 January 1976. It was the third time the Rossiya Tournament was arranged. The Soviet Union won the tournament.

The tournament was decided by round-robin results like a group stage.

== Results ==
| Team | Pld | W | D | L | GF | GA | GD | Pts |
|---|---|---|---|---|---|---|---|---|
| Soviet Union | 3 | 3 | 0 | 0 | 17 | 4 | +13 | 6 |
| Sweden | 3 | 2 | 0 | 1 | 12 | 5 | +7 | 4 |
| Finland | 3 | 1 | 0 | 2 | 7 | 9 | −2 | 2 |
| Norway | 3 | 0 | 0 | 3 | 4 | 22 | −18 | 0 |

== Sources ==
- Norges herrlandskamper i bandy (Norway)
- Sverige-Sovjet i bandy (Sweden)
- Rossija Tournament (Russia)
