= Rossiya Tournament 1988 =

Rossiya Tournament 1988 in bandy was played in Abakan during the period of 26-31 January 1990, and was won by the Soviet Union. The United States played for the first time and was the first transatlantic team ever in the tournament.

This year's Rossiya Tournament began with a group stage and then had a final between the two best teams to decide the final winner, with the third and fourth teams playing a third place consolation game.

== Results of group stage ==
Team	Pld	W	D	L	GF	GA	GD	Pts
Sweden	4	4	0	0	38	12	+26	8
Soviet Union	4	3	0	1	36	9	+27	6
Finland	4	2	0	2	28	8	+20	4
Norway	4	1	0	3	14	33	−19	2
United States	4	0	0	4	2	46	−44	0

== Knock-out stage ==
=== Match for third place ===
Finland - Norway 11-2

=== Final ===
Soviet Union - Sweden 4-3
