= 1957 Bandy World Championship =

1st Bandy World Championship

Tournament details
- Host country: Finland
- City: Helsinki
- Venue: 1 (in 1 host city)
- Dates: 28 February – 3 March
- Teams: 3

Final positions
- Champions: Soviet Union
- Runners-up: Finland
- Third place: Sweden

Tournament statistics
- Games played: 3
- Goals scored: 18 (6 per game)
- Scoring leader(s): Alpo Aho (FIN), Valentin Antamaiev (URS), Yevgeny Papugin (URS) (each 3 points)

The 1957 Bandy World Championship was contested among three men's bandy playing nations and was the first ever Bandy World Championship. Norway declined to take part due to the Soviet invasion of Hungary in November 1956.

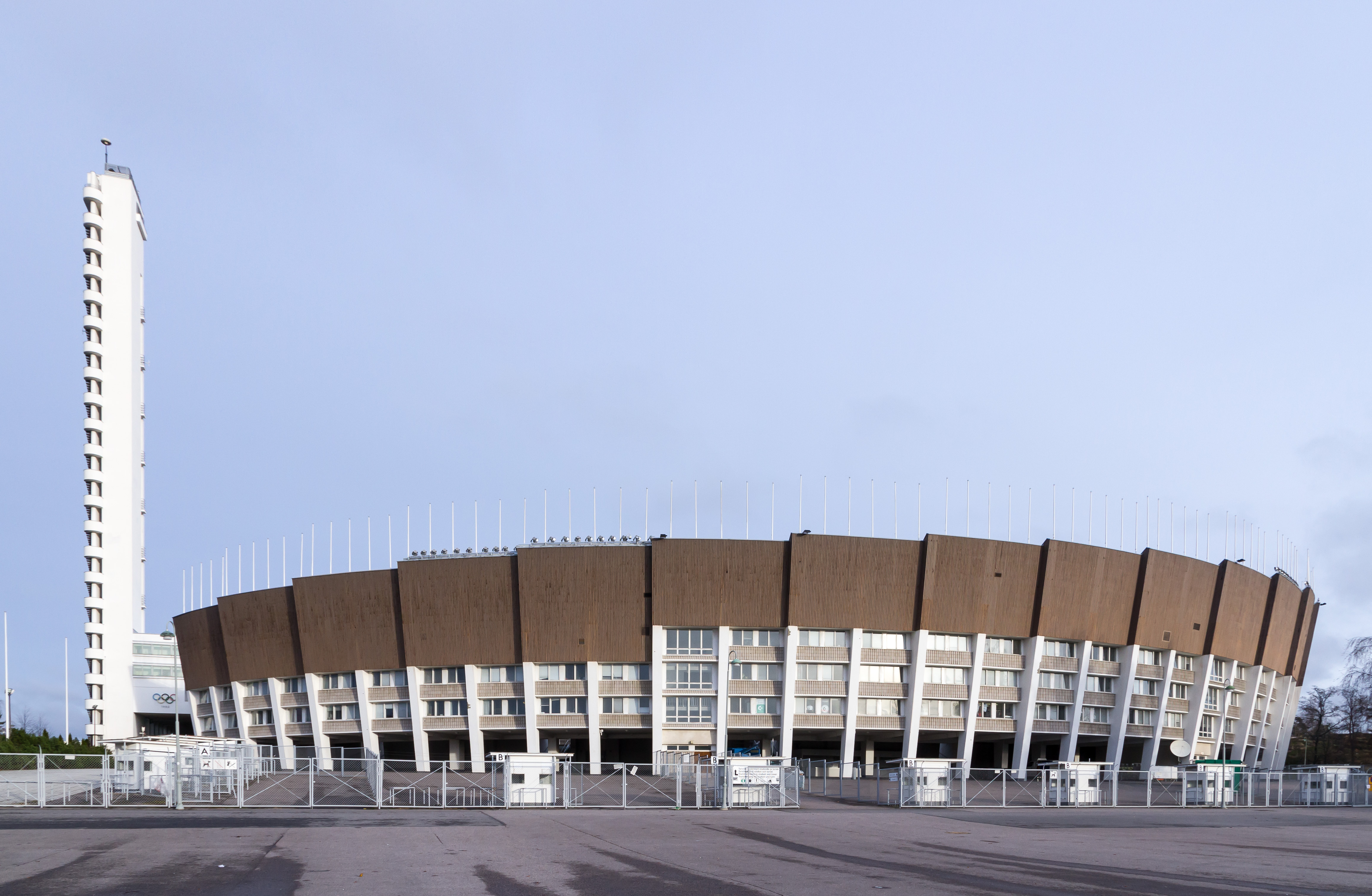
The venue of the games was the Helsinki Olympic Stadium.

The championship was played in Finland from 28 February to 3 March 1957, as part of the 50th anniversary celebrations for the Ball Association of Finland, which at the time was the governing body for bandy in Finland. The tournament was officially opened by President of the republic Urho Kekkonen. All three games of the tournament were played at the Helsinki Olympic Stadium. The Soviet Union became champions.

== Qualified nations ==
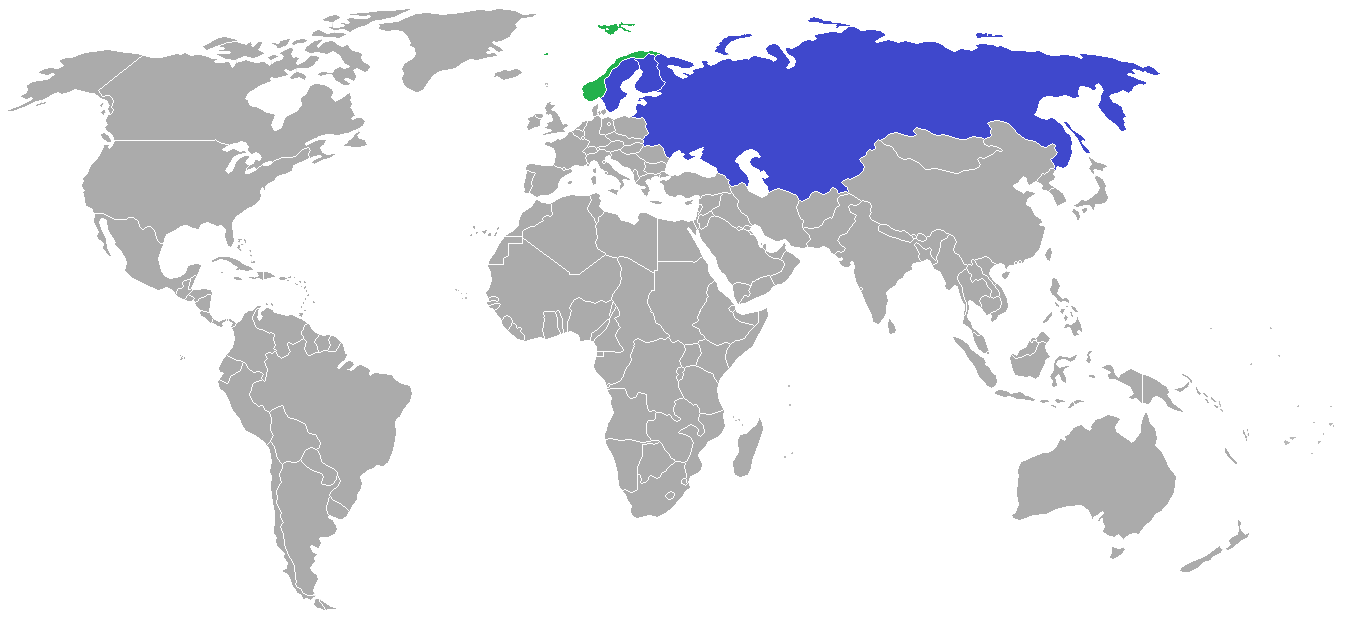
Participating countries in the 1957 Bandy World Championship Blue: countries participating Green: members of the Federation of International Bandy not participating in this year's World Championship

- Soviet Union
- Finland
- Sweden

== Tournament ==
All times are local (UTC+2).

Pos	Team	Pld	W	D	L	GF	GA	GD	Pts
1	Soviet Union	2	1	1	0	8	3	+5	3
2	Finland (H)	2	1	0	1	5	9	−4	2
3	Sweden	2	0	1	1	5	6	−1	1

Source: 1957 WCS MEN – RESULTS
(H) Hosts
28 February 1957
-

Finland	4-3	Sweden
Tauno Timoska 3', 59'; Alpo Aho <45', 46'	Report	Tore Wikner >3'; Nils Wikman 28'; Leif Fredblad <45'

Helsinki Olympic Stadium, Helsinki
Attendance: -
Referee: (Soviet Union) Pyotr Belov, (Soviet Union) Nikolai Khlopotin

2 March 1957
-

Soviet Union	2-2	Sweden
Yevgeny Papugin 79'; Valentin Antamaiev 90'	Report	Gunnar Jansson 27'; Olle Sääw 60'

Helsinki Olympic Stadium, Helsinki
Attendance: 6,169
Referee: (Finland) Yu. Alho, (Finland) R. Heinonen

3 March 1957
14:00

Soviet Union	6-1	Finland
Valentin Antamaiev 26', 70'; Gennady Vodyanov 40'; Yevgeny Papugin 61', 68'; Leo Shunin 89'	Report	Alpo Aho 84'

Helsinki Olympic Stadium, Helsinki
Attendance: 14,369
Referee: (Sweden) E. Ongman, (Sweden) E. Johansson, (Soviet Union) Pyotr Belov, (Finland) R. Heinonen

=== Final ranking ===
Rank	Team
1st place, gold medalist(s)	Soviet Union
2nd place, silver medalist(s)	Finland
3rd place, bronze medalist(s)	Sweden

=== Top Scorer ===
Scoring Leaders

- 3 Goals: (Soviet Union) Valentin Antamaiev
- 3 Goals: (Soviet Union) Yevgeny Papugin
- 3 Goals: (Finland) Alpo Aho
- 2 Goals: (Finland) Tauno Timoska
- 1 Goals: (Sweden) Tore Wikner
- 1 Goals: (Sweden) Nils Wikman
- 1 Goals: (Sweden) Leif Fredblad
- 1 Goals: (Sweden) Gunnar Jansson
- 1 Goals: (Sweden) Olle Sääw
- 1 Goals: (Soviet Union) Leo Shunin
- 1 Goals: (Soviet Union) Gennady Vodyanov

=== Awards ===
Best players selected by the directorate:

- Best Goaltender: (Soviet Union) Anatoly Malnikov
- Best Defenceman: (Sweden) Tore Wikner
- Best Midfielder: (Soviet Union) Nikolai Durakov
- Best Forward: (Finland) Tauno Timoska
