= HT Bandy =

- City: Haparanda, Sweden; Tornio, Finland
- Founded: 22 July 2008
- Folded: 9 March 2017
- Home arena: Gränsvallen

HT Bandy (Swedish: HaparandaTornio Bandyförening; Finnish: Haaparanta-Tornion Palloveikot) was a Swedish-Finnish bandy club. The club was located to Haparanda in Sweden and Tornio in Finland, two towns on each side of the Swedish-Finnish border. It was founded on 22 July 2008 when the two clubs in the towns decided to merge formally, after having had a deep cooperation for many years.

HaparandaTornio played in Elitserien, the top-tier of Swedish bandy, in the 2009–10 and 2010–11 seasons, but has since been playing in the second-level league, Allsvenskan.

On 9 March 2017, HaparandaTornio BF folded.
