= Rossiya Tournament 1978 =

Rossiya Tournament 1978 was an international bandy competition played in Kemerovo on 24-28 January 1978. The Soviet Union won the tournament.

The tournament was decided by round-robin results like a group stage.

== Results ==
Team	Pld	W	D	L	GF	GA	GD	Pts
Soviet Union	3	3	0	0	17	6	+11	6
Finland	3	2	0	1	8	7	+1	4
Sweden	3	1	0	2	11	10	+1	2
Norway	3	0	0	3	3	15	−12	0

== Sources ==
- Norges herrlandskamper i bandy (Norway)
- Sverige-Sovjet i bandy (Sweden)
- Rossija Tournament (Russia)
