= Gunnar Jansson =

Gunnar Jansson may refer to

- Gunnar Jansson (footballer), Swedish association football player
- Gunnar Jansson (athlete) (1897–1953), Swedish Olympic hammer thrower
- Gunnar Janson (1901–1983), Norwegian sculptor
