= Ola Johansson =

Ola Johansson may refer to:

- Ola Johansson (footballer)
- Ola Johansson (politician)
