= Rossiya Tournament 1990 =

Rossiya Tournament 1990 was a bandy competition played in Novosibirsk under the period 26–31 January 1990, and was won by Sweden. Hungary played for the first time.

The tournament began with a group stage and then had a knock-out stage to decide the final winner, with the teams losing in the semi-finals playing a third place consolation game.

== Results of group stage ==
Team	Pld	W	D	L	GF	GA	GD	Pts
Soviet Union	4	4	0	0	16	3	+13	8
Finland	4	3	0	1	17	5	+12	6
Sweden	4	2	0	2	14	4	+10	4
Norway	4	1	0	3	12	12	0	2
Hungary	4	0	0	4	4	39	−35	0

== Knock-out stage ==
=== Semifinals ===
Finland - Norway 6-1
Soviet Union - Sweden 3-4

=== Match for third place ===
Soviet Union - Norway 12-1

=== Final ===
Sweden - Finland 4-2

== Sources ==
- "Rossija-turnaus 1990". 8 September 2013.
- Norges herrlandskamper i bandy
- Sverige-Sovjet i bandy
- Rossijaturneringen
