= Helsinki Olympic Stadium =

Sports stadium in Helsinki, Finland

- Helsingin olympiastadion Helsingfors Olympiastadion
- "Stadikka"
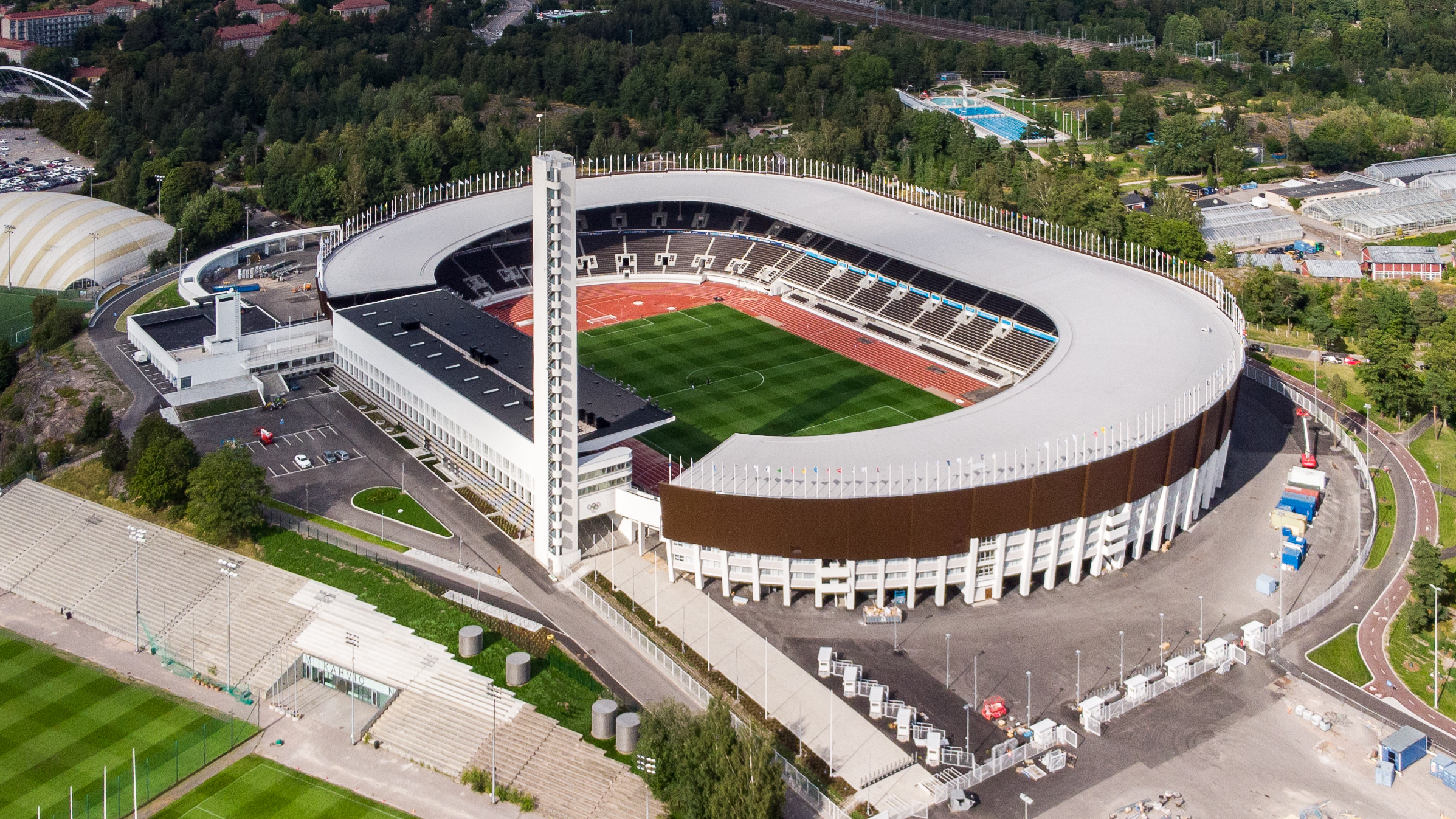
- UEFA
- Interactive map of Helsinki Olympic Stadium
- Location: Helsinki, Finland
- Coordinates: 60°11′13″N 024°55′38″E
- Owner: Stadion-säätiö
- Capacity: 36,251
- Surface: Grass
- Field size: 105 m × 68 m (115 yd × 74 yd)

Construction
- Groundbreaking: 12 February 1934; 92 years ago
- Opened: 12 June 1938; 88 years ago
- Renovated: 1939, 1947–1952, 1953–1956, 1961, 1971, 1991–1994, 1997–1998, 2004–2005, 2010–2011, 2016–2020
- Architects: Yrjö Lindegren and Toivo Jäntti

Tenants
- Finland national football team (1938–present); Finnish Athletics Federation

Website
- www.stadion.fi

The Helsinki Olympic Stadium (Finnish: Helsingin Olympiastadion; Swedish: Helsingfors Olympiastadion), located in the Töölö district about 2.3 kilometres (1.4 mi) from the centre of the Finnish capital Helsinki, is the largest stadium in the country. The stadium is best known for being the centre of activities in the 1952 Summer Olympics. During those games, it hosted athletics, equestrian show jumping, and the football finals.

The stadium was also the venue for the first Bandy World Championship in 1957, the first and tenth World Athletics Championships, in 1983 and 2005. It hosted the European Athletics Championships in 1971, 1994 and 2012. It is also the home stadium of the Finland national football team.

The stadium reopened in August 2020 after four years of renovation.

== History ==
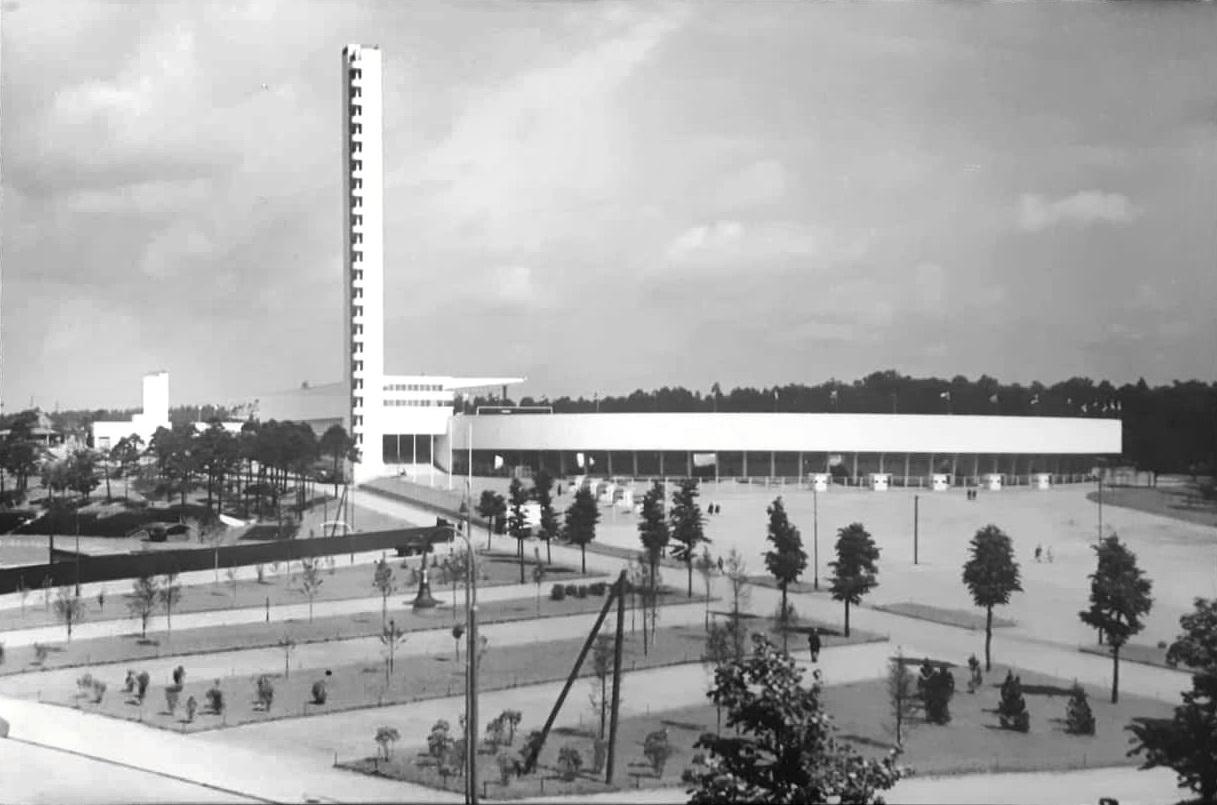
Helsinki Olympic Stadium in 1938 soon after its completion. The stadium, first built for the 1940 Olympics, had to wait until 1952 for its intended use as an arena for the Olympic games as the war led to the cancellation of the event.

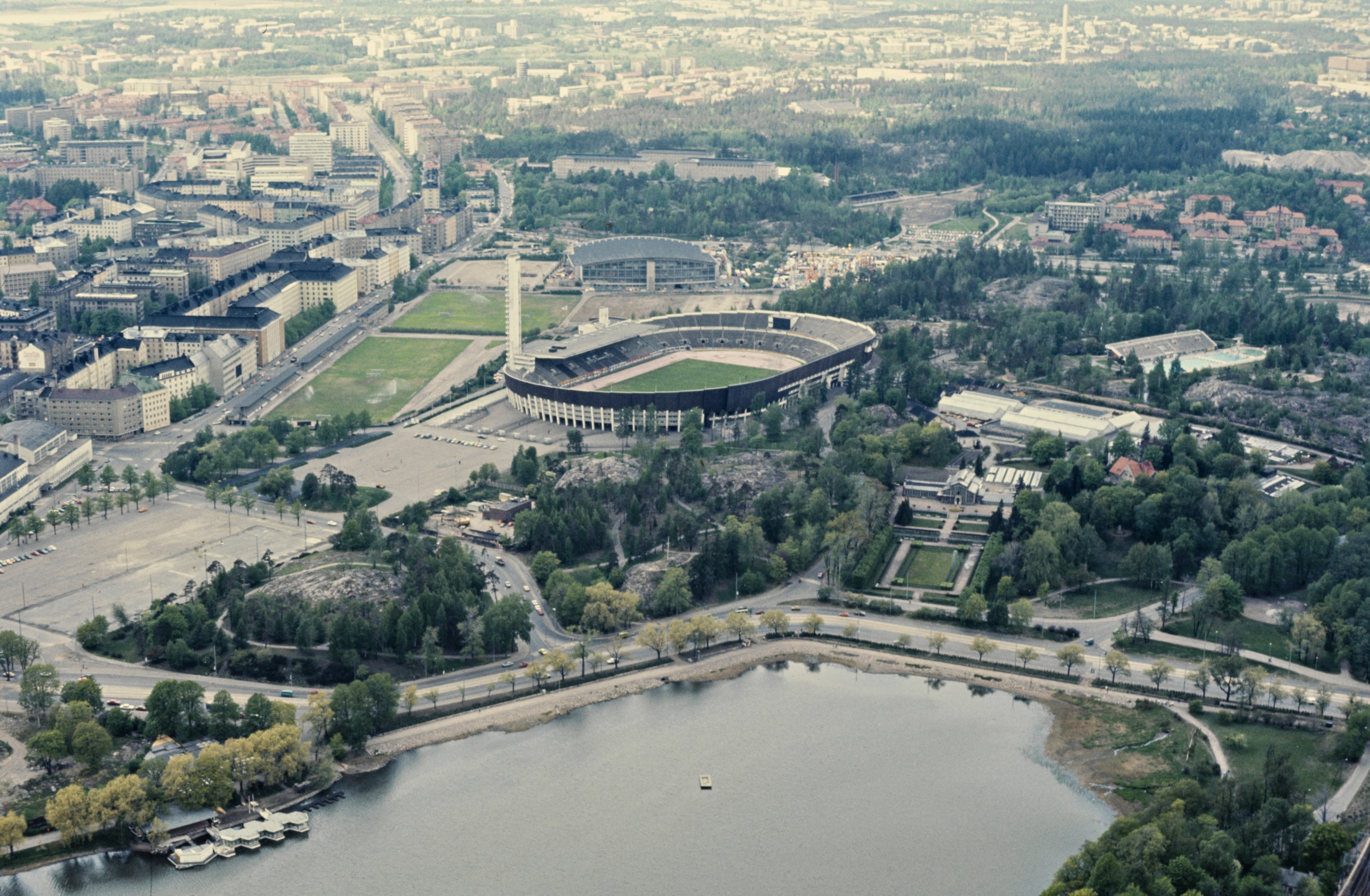
Aerial view of the Olympic Stadium in 1976

The Olympic Stadium was designed by the architects Yrjö Lindegren and Toivo Jäntti. The Olympic stadium, known as an icon of functionalist style of architecture, was featured in the Architectural Digest as one of the best examples of Olympic architecture. Yrjö Lindgren later became an Olympic medallist when he received the gold medal for architecture at the 1948 Olympics in London.

Construction of the Olympic Stadium began in 1934 and it was completed in 1938, with the intent to host the 1940 Summer Olympics, which were moved from Tokyo to Helsinki before being cancelled due to World War II. It hosted the 1952 Summer Olympics over a decade later instead. The stadium was also to be the main venue for the cancelled 1943 Workers' Summer Olympiad.

It was the venue for the first ever Bandy World Championship in 1957.

In 2006, an American TV series, The Amazing Race 10, had one of its episodes ending at The Olympic Stadium Tower. As a task, teams had to do a face-first rappel (known as the Angel Dive) down the Helsinki Olympic Tower.

Since March 2007, a Eurasian eagle-owl has been spotted living in and around the stadium. On 6 June 2007, during a Euro 2008 qualifying match, the owl delayed play by ten minutes after perching on a goalpost. Due to strict conservation laws, no physical attempt to persuade the bird to leave were allowed. The owl was later christened Bubi and was named as Helsinki's Resident of the Year. The Belgians quite unexpectedly lost the match to Finland by 2–0. Afterwards they claimed it was due to the owl who "disturbed their rhythm of playing". This promoted Bubi owl to something like a Finnish national football hero and from that time on the Finnish men's football Team has been called "Huuhkajat" (The Eagle-Owls) .

Constructing the Helsinki Olympic Stadium

The 50th anniversary of the Helsinki Olympic Games hosted in the Helsinki Olympic Stadium was the main motif for one of the first Finnish euro silver commemorative coins, the 50th anniversary of the Helsinki Olympic Games commemorative coin, minted in 2002. On the reverse, a view of the Helsinki Olympic Stadium can be seen. On the right, the 500 markka commemorative coin minted in 1952 celebrating the occasion is depicted.

There were plans to host the 2021 Superpesis finals at the Olympic Stadium, but opposition from the clubs about preferring best-of-5 finals instead of a single match, worries about the playing surface (Playing on natural grass and running track surface, in a sport that prefer artificial grass and sand), and scheduling conflicts, led the plan to be called off. As of 2025, the last high-profile pesäpallo event held at the stadium was the 1987 Itä–Länsi-ottelu all-star game.

== Features ==
The tower of the Helsinki Olympic Stadium in 1952, a distinct landmark with a height of 72.71 metres (238.5 ft).

Helsinki Olympic Stadium in 1952

Helsinki Olympic Stadium in 1952

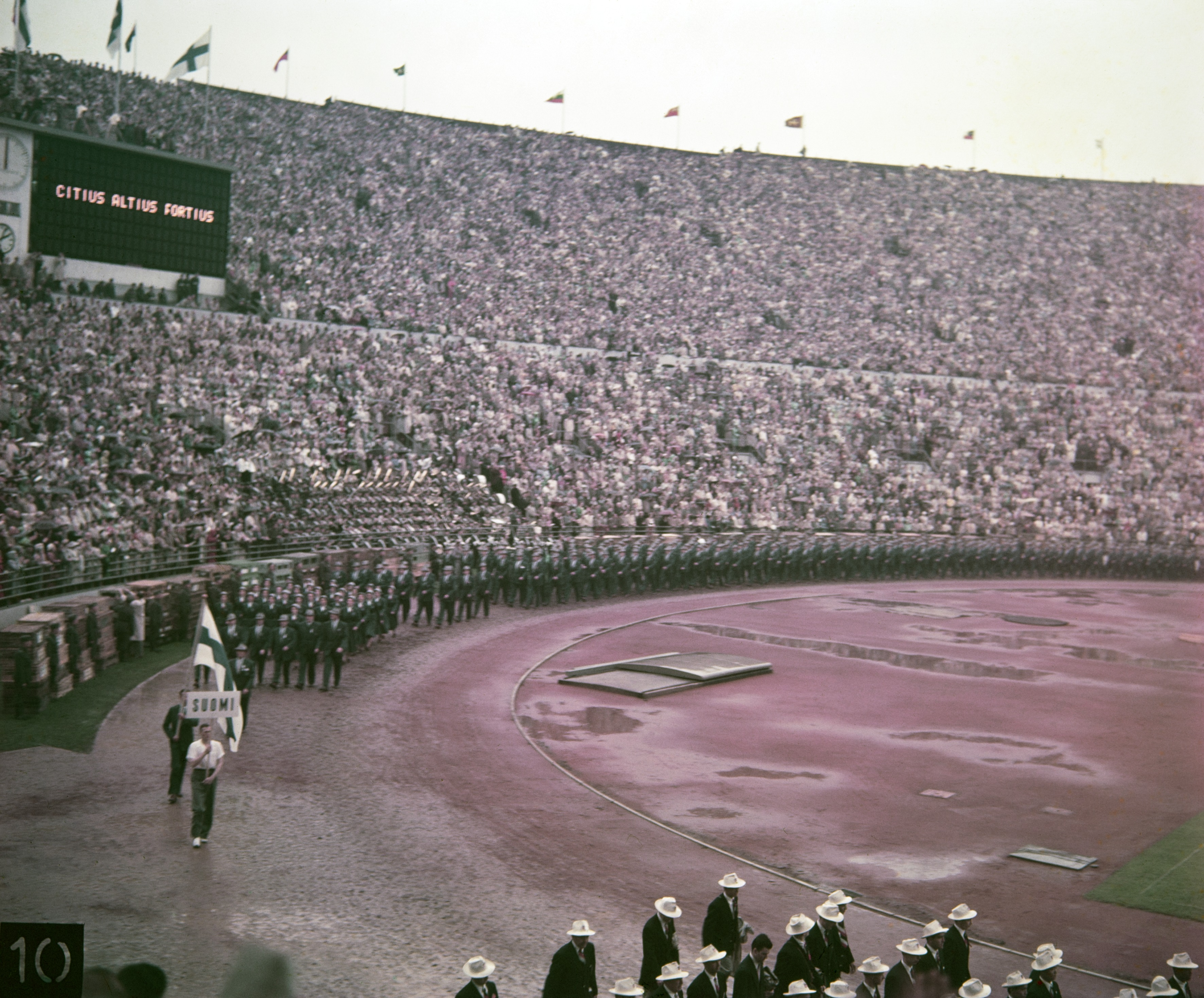
Host country Finland in the 1952 Summer Olympics

Helsinki Olympic Stadium in 1952

The stadium's spectator capacity was at its maximum during the 1952 Summer Olympics with over 70,000 spectator places (this capacity was achieved by temporarily extending its upper tier on its north, east and south stands). Nowadays the stadium has 36,251 spectator places. During concerts, depending on the size of the stage, the capacity is 45,000–50,000.

The tower of the stadium, a distinct landmark with a height of 72.71 metres (238.5 ft), a measurement of the length of the gold-medal win by Matti Järvinen in javelin throw of 1932 Summer Olympics.

== Renovations ==
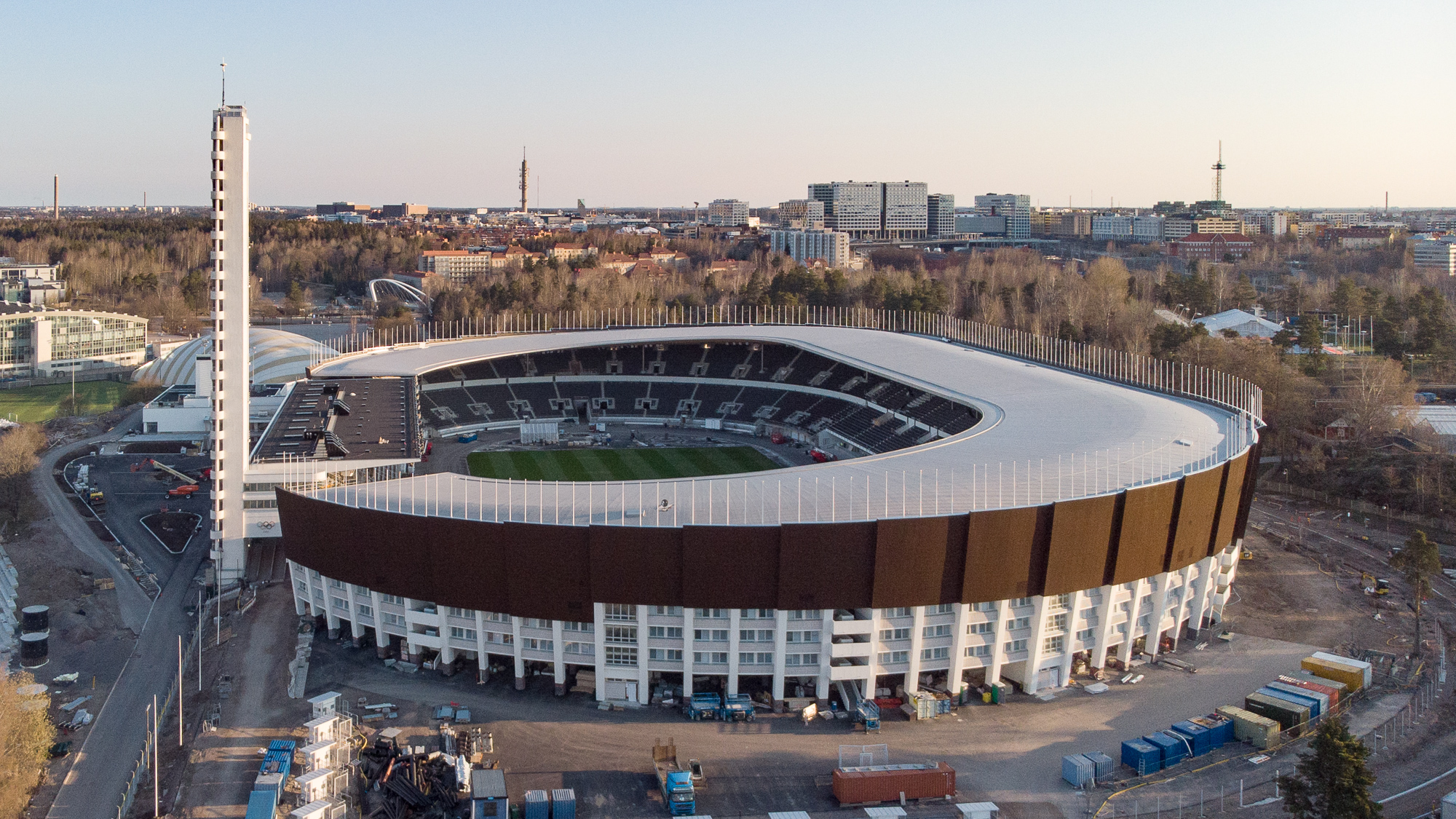
The stadium nearing the end of renovation in April 2020

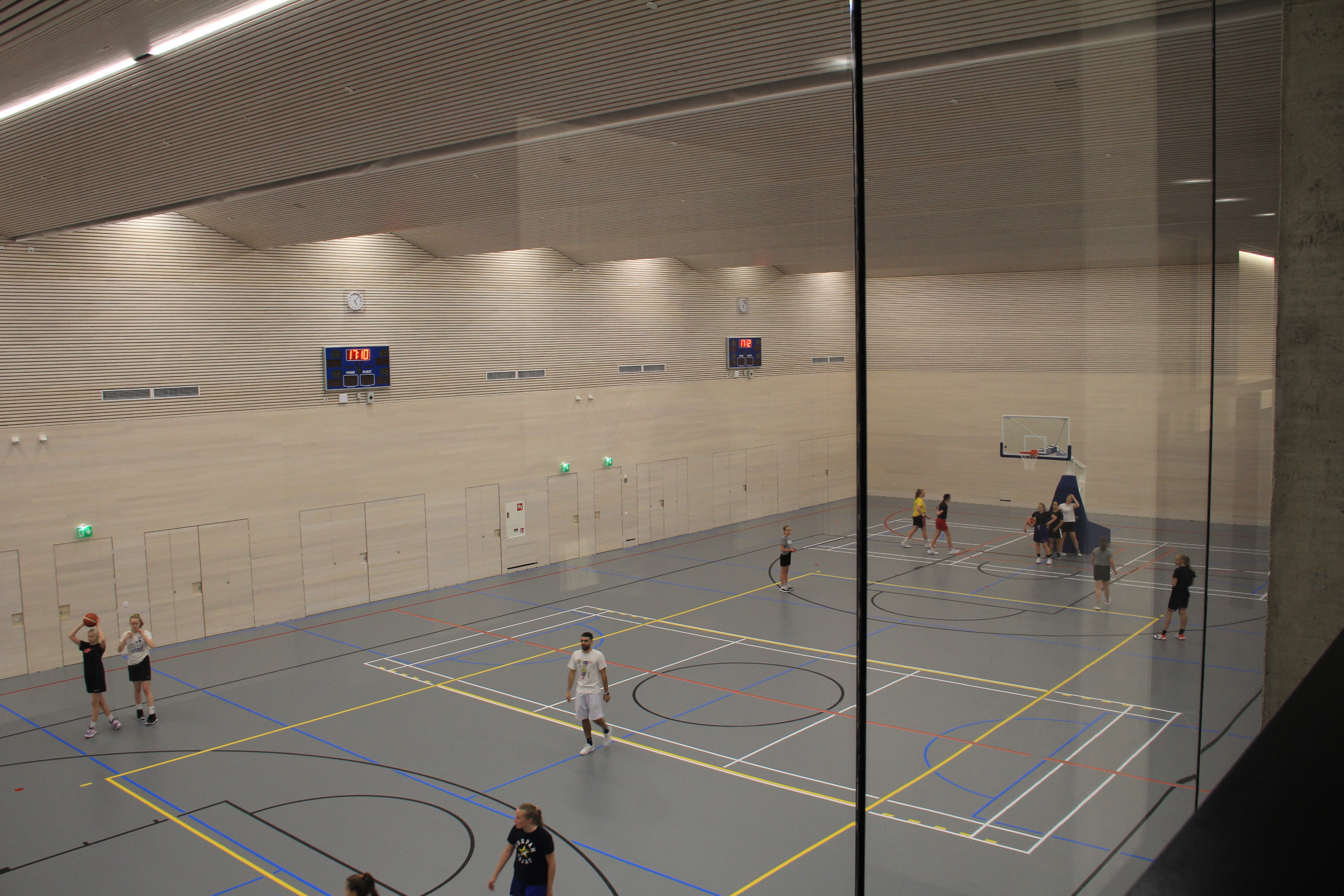
The stadium Gymnasium 1 was completed in 2020 renovation. It's located underground

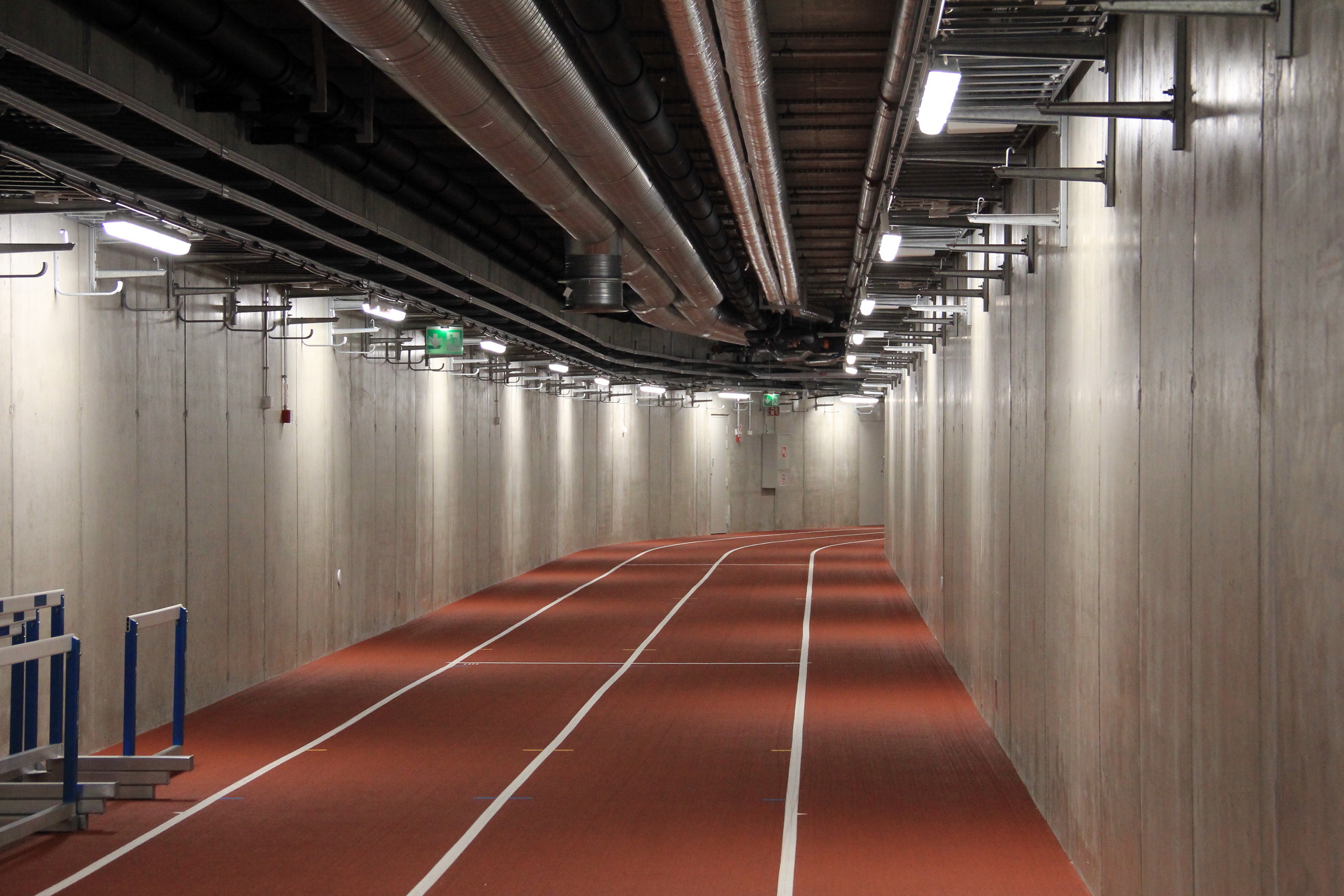
Tunnel is a full-track 2-lane running track, below the field's above-ground running track.

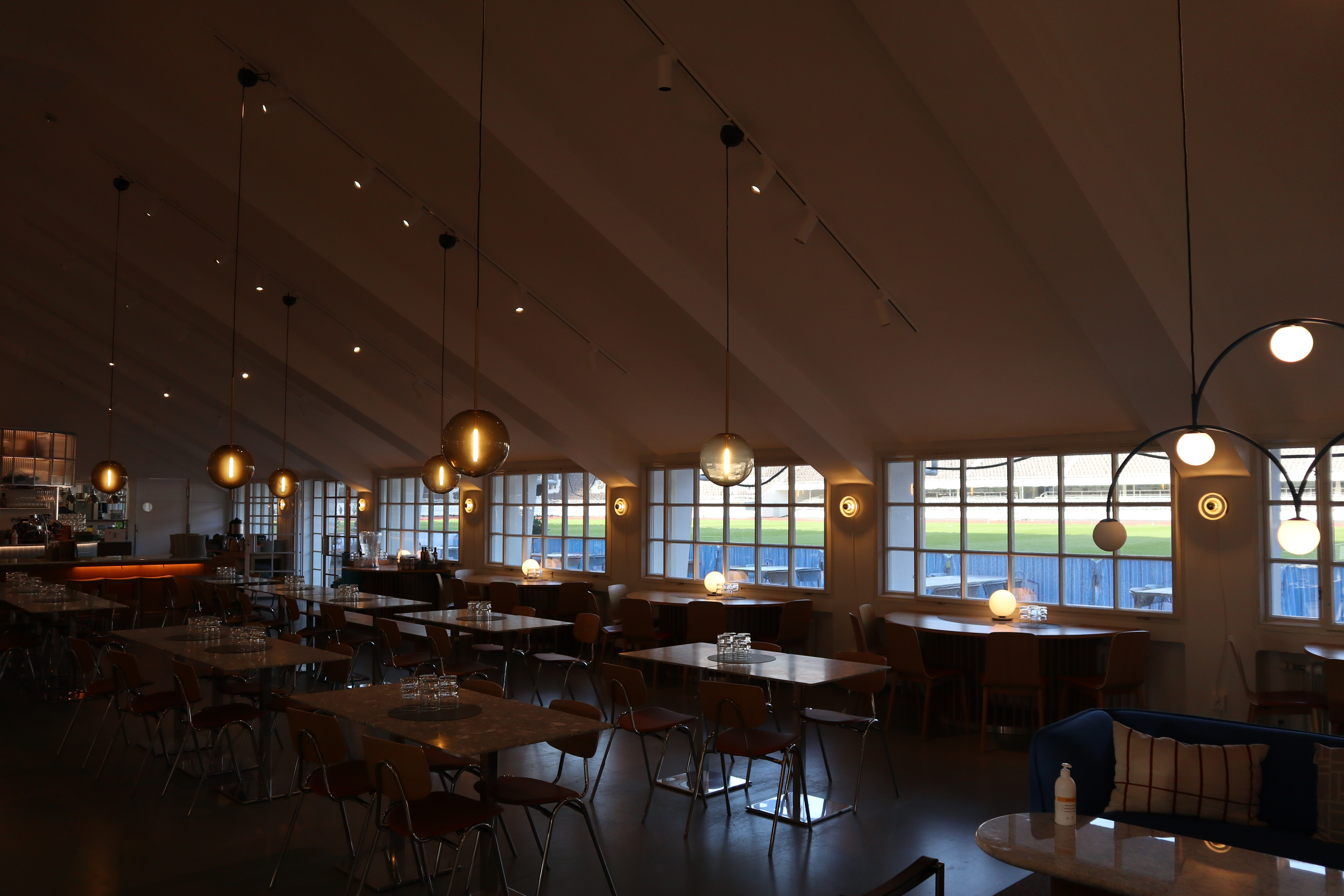
The stadium restaurant

The stadium was completely modernized in 1990–1994 and also renovated just before the 2005 World Championships in Athletics.

Major renovation work at the stadium started in the spring of 2016. During renovation all the spectator stands were covered with canopies and the field area and the tracks were renewed. The stadium now also offers extended restaurant areas and more indoor sport venues. The renovation was completed and the stadium was open to the public in September 2020.

The projected cost of the renovation was expected to consume €197 million in 2016, €261 million in 2019 and ended up at a price of €337 million, which is €140 million (or 70 percent) more than the original projected cost. The Finnish state and the City of Helsinki funded the renovation.

== Events ==
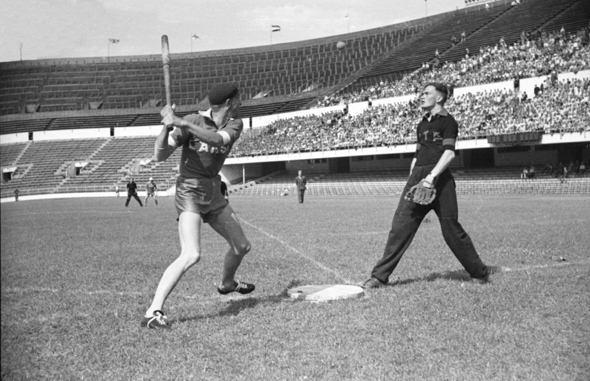
Team West at bat in the 1947 Itä-Länsi-ottelu pesäpallo all-star game.

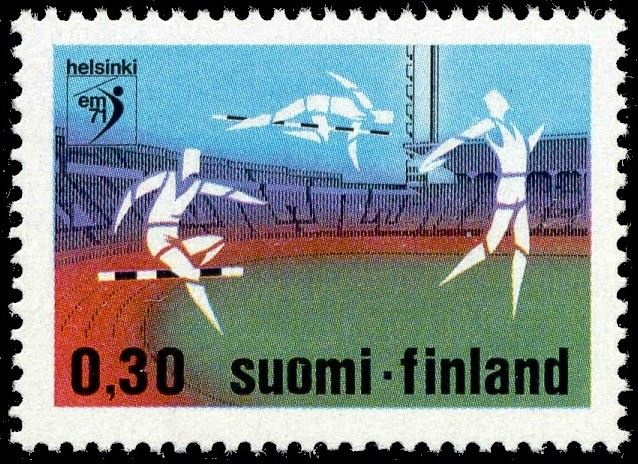
Stamp of the 1971 European Athletics Championships at the Helsinki Olympic Stadium

=== Sport events ===
- 1952 Summer Olympics
- 1957 Bandy World Championship
- 1971 European Athletics Championships
- 1983 World Championships in Athletics
- 1994 European Athletics Championships
- 2005 World Championships in Athletics
- UEFA Women's Euro 2009 (4 Group matches and a Final)
- 2012 European Athletics Championships
- 2022 UEFA Super Cup
- 2030 European Athletics Championships

=== Concerts ===
Date	Artist(s)	Supporting act(s)	Tour
2 September 1970	The Rolling Stones	Junior Wells All Stars; Buddy Guy	The Rolling Stones European Tour 1970
4 August 1992	Dire Straits	Was (Not Was)	On Every Street Tour
6 June 1995	The Rolling Stones	Robert Cray	Voodoo Lounge Tour
19 July 1996	Bon Jovi	Lemonator; Babylon Zoo	These Days Tour
9 August 1996	Tina Turner	—	Wildest Dreams Tour
9 August 1997	U2	Audioweb	PopMart Tour
24 August 1997	Michael Jackson	—	HIStory World Tour
26 August 1997	Michael Jackson	—	HIStory World Tour
25 June 1998	Elton John	—	—
5 August 1998	The Rolling Stones	—	Bridges to Babylon Tour
5 August 1999	Mestarit	—	—
26 June 2001	AC/DC	George Thorogood & The Destroyers	Stiff Upper Lip World Tour
16 June 2003	Bruce Springsteen	—	The Rising Tour
17 June 2003	Bruce Springsteen	—	The Rising Tour
16 July 2003	The Rolling Stones	ZZ Top; The Hellacopters	Licks Tour
28 May 2004	Metallica	Slipknot; Lostprophets	Madly in Anger with the World Tour
17 June 2004	Paul McCartney	—	2004 Summer Tour
11 June 2007	Genesis	—	Turn It On Again: The Tour
15 July 2007	Metallica	HIM; Diablo	Sick of the Studio '07
1 August 2007	The Rolling Stones	Toots & The Maytals	A Bigger Bang Tour
16 June 2008	Bon Jovi	MoonMadness	Lost Highway Tour
11 July 2008	Bruce Springsteen	—	Magic Tour
18 July 2008	Iron Maiden	Avenged Sevenfold; Lauren Harris	Somewhere Back in Time World Tour
17 June 2009	AC/DC	The Answer; Blake	Black Ice World Tour
20 August 2010	U2	Razorlight	U2 360° Tour
21 August 2010	U2	Razorlight	U2 360° Tour
17 June 2011	Bon Jovi	Block Buster; The Breakers	Bon Jovi Live
8 July 2011	Iron Maiden	Alice Cooper	The Final Frontier World Tour
31 July 2012	Bruce Springsteen	—	Wrecking Ball World Tour
12 August 2012	Madonna	Martin Solveig	The MDNA Tour
20 July 2013	Iron Maiden	Amorphis; Sabaton; Ghost	Maiden England World Tour
27 July 2013	Muse	Mew; French Films	The 2nd Law World Tour
22 August 2014	Cheek	JVG	—
23 August 2014	Cheek	JVG	—
27 June 2015	One Direction	Isac Elliot; McBusted	On the Road Again Tour
16 August 2015	Jari Sillanpää	—	—
18 June 2022	Haloo Helsinki	—	—
2 July 2022	Apulanta	—	—
8 July 2022	Sunrise Avenue	—	The Final Tour
9 July 2022	Sunrise Avenue	—	The Final Tour
20 August 2022	Ed Sheeran	Cat Burns; Maisie Peters	+–=÷x Tour
9 September 2022	Antti Tuisku	Erika Vikman	Bailantai
10 September 2022	Antti Tuisku	Ida Paul & Kalle Lindroth	Bailantai
27 May 2023	Rammstein	ABÉLARD	Rammstein Stadium Tour
28 May 2023	Rammstein	ABÉLARD	Rammstein Stadium Tour
12 August 2023	JVG	Gasellit; Ege Zulu	Vuodet Ollu Tuulisii
19 August 2023	Kaija Koo	Käärijä	Superstadion
7 June 2024	Metallica	Architects; Mammoth WVH	M72 World Tour
9 June 2024	Metallica	Five Finger Death Punch; Ice Nine Kills	M72 World Tour
12 July 2024	Bruce Springsteen	—	2024 World Tour
27 July 2024	Coldplay	Maisie Peters; Alma	Music of the Spheres World Tour
28 July 2024	Coldplay	Maisie Peters; Alma	Music of the Spheres World Tour
30 July 2024	Coldplay	Maisie Peters; Alma	Music of the Spheres World Tour
31 July 2024	Coldplay	Maisie Peters; Alma	Music of the Spheres World Tour
23 August 2024	PMMP	—	Koko Show
24 August 2024	PMMP	—	Koko Show
16 June 2025	Iron Maiden	Halestorm	Run For Your Lives World Tour
20 September 2025	Robbie Williams	The Lottery Winners	Britpop Tour

== See also ==
- List of association football stadiums by capacity
- Lists of stadiums

Preceded by Empire Stadium; London	Summer Olympics; Main venue (Olympic Stadium); 1952	Succeeded by Melbourne Cricket Ground; Melbourne
Preceded by Empire Stadium; London	Summer Olympics; Athletic competitions Main venue 1952	Succeeded by Melbourne Cricket Ground; Melbourne
Preceded by Empire Stadium; London	Summer Olympics; Men's football Final venue 1952	Succeeded by Melbourne Cricket Ground; Melbourne
Preceded by Ewood Park; Blackburn	UEFA Women's Euro; Final venue 2009	Succeeded by Friends Arena; Solna
Preceded by Windsor Park; Belfast	UEFA Super Cup; Match venue 2022	Succeeded by Karaiskakis Stadium; Piraeus
