= Rossiya Tournament 1980 =

Rossiya Tournament 1980 was a bandy competition played in Syktyvkar on 1-5 February 1980. The Soviet Union won the tournament.

The tournament was decided by round-robin results like a group stage. Norway was invited but chose not to come. Instead, a team for Komi ASSR was set up to fill out the field.

== Results ==
Team	Pld	W	D	L	GF	GA	GD	Pts
Soviet Union	3	3	0	0	20	5	+15	6
Sweden	3	2	0	1	27	6	+21	4
Finland	3	1	0	2	5	18	−13	2
Komi ASSR	3	0	0	3	2	25	−23	0

== Sources ==
- Norges herrlandskamper i bandy (Norway)
- Sverige-Sovjet i bandy (Sweden)
- Rossija Tournament (Russia)
