= Rossiya Tournament 1984 =

Rossija tournament 1984 was a bandy competition played in Kemerovo on 3-7 February 1984. The Soviet Union won the tournament.

The tournament was decided by round-robin results like a group stage.

== Results ==
Team	Pld	W	D	L	GF	GA	GD	Pts
Soviet Union	3	2	1	0	11	2	+9	5
Sweden	3	2	1	0	8	3	+5	5
Norway	3	1	0	2	2	5	−3	2
Finland	3	0	0	3	2	13	−11	0

== Sources ==
- Norges herrlandskamper i bandy (Norway)
- Sverige-Sovjet i bandy (Sweden)
- Rossija Tournament (Russia)
