= Hans Johansson =

Hans Johansson may refer to:

- Hans Johansson (bandy) (born 1962), Swedish former bandy player
- Hans Johansson (equestrian) (1927–2012), Swedish equestrian
- Hans Johansson (footballer) (born 1964), Swedish former footballer
- Hans Johansson (Djurgårdens IF Fotboll footballer), Swedish former footballer
- Hans Johansson (Djurgårdens IF Fotboll footballer 1971), Swedish former footballer
