= Trond Amundsen =

Trond Amundsen can refer to:

- Trond Amundsen (biologist) (born 1957), Norwegian biologist
- Trond Amundsen (football coach) (born 1971), Norwegian football coach
