= Rossiya Tournament 1982 =

Rossiya Tournament 1982 was a bandy competition played in Syktyvkar on 6–9 February 1982. The Soviet union won the tournament.

The tournament was decided by round-robin results like a group stage.

== Results ==
Team	Pld	W	D	L	GF	GA	GD	Pts
Soviet Union	3	3	0	0	16	4	+12	6
Sweden	3	2	0	1	14	6	+8	4
Finland	3	1	0	2	9	10	−1	2
Norway	3	0	0	3	1	20	−19	0

== Sources ==
- Norges herrlandskamper i bandy (Norway)
- Sverige-Sovjet i bandy (Sweden)
- Rossija Tournament (Russia)
