= Anatoly Frolov =

Russian politician (1930–2025)

- Анатолий Фролов
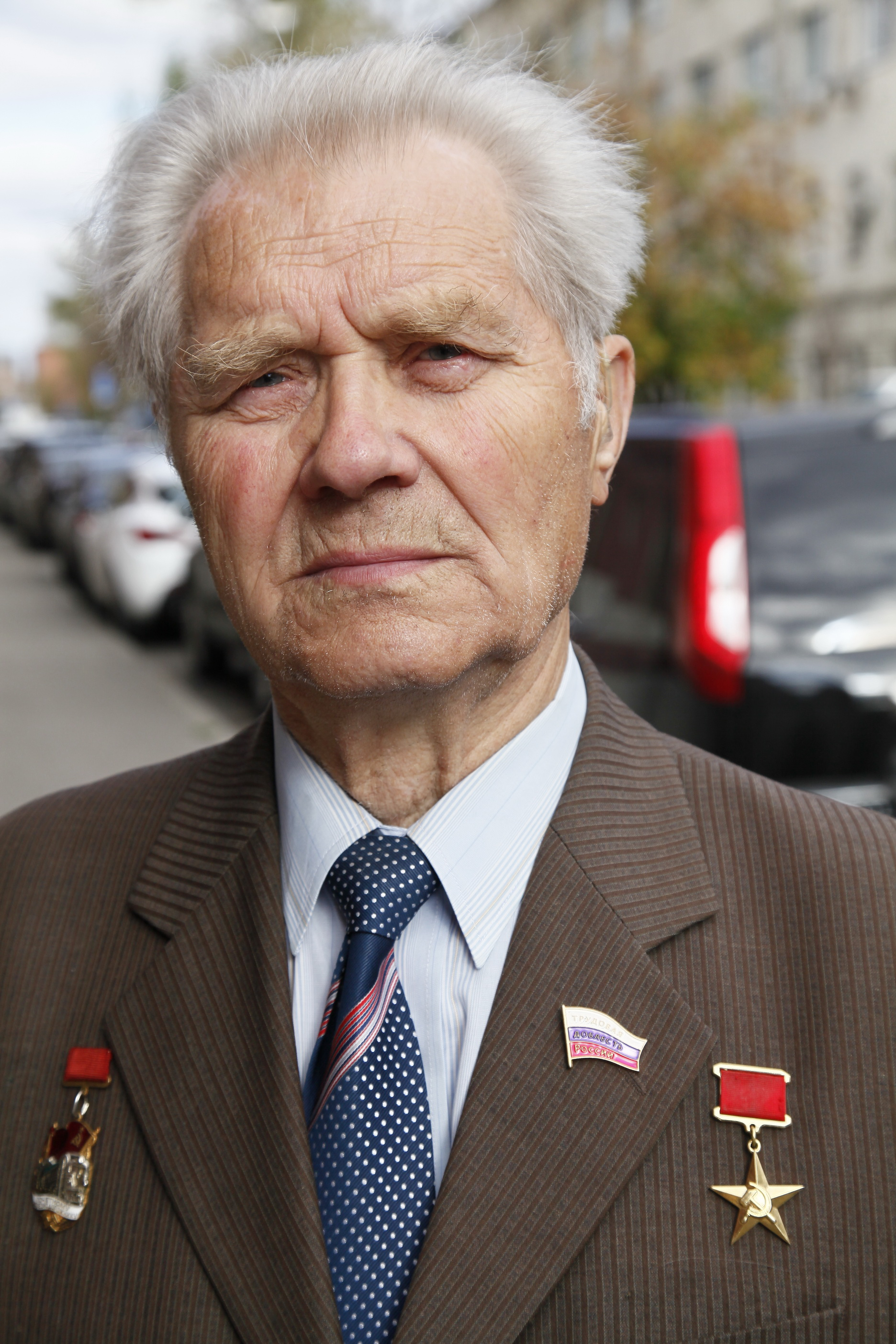
- Frolov in 2015

Member of the Supreme Soviet of the Russian SFSR
- In office 1980–1985

Personal details
- Born: Anatoly Ivanovich Frolov; 18 October 1930 Sergiyev Posad, Russian SFSR, USSR
- Died: 6 November 2025 (aged 95)
- Political party: CPSU
- Education: Railway School No. 3
- Occupation: Railway worker

Anatoly Ivanovich Frolov (Russian: Анатолий Иванович Фролов; 18 October 1930 – 6 November 2025) was a Russian politician. A member of the Communist Party of the Soviet Union, he served in the Supreme Soviet of the Russian SFSR from 1980 to 1985.

Frolov died on 6 November 2025, at the age of 95.
