= Tauno Timoska =

Finnish hockey player (1932–2022)

Personal information
- Nationality: Finnish
- Born: 5 April 1932 Turku, Finland
- Died: 15 June 2022 (aged 90) Helsinki, Finland

Sport
- Sport: Field hockey

Tauno Timoska (5 April 1932 – 15 June 2022) was a Finnish field hockey player. He competed in the men's tournament at the 1952 Summer Olympics.
