= Isstadion =

Isstadion (Swedish: ice stadium) is the name of several stadia or ice skating arenas in Sweden:

- Malmö Isstadion
- Skien Isstadion
- E.ON Arena
- Hovet
